= 2018 A Lyga =

A Lyga
- Season: 2018
- Champions: Sūduva
- Relegated: Jonava
- Champions League: Sūduva
- Europa League: Žalgiris; Trakai; Stumbras
- Matches: 127
- Goals: 331 (2.61 per match)
- Top goalscorer: Liviu Antal (23 goals)
- Biggest home win: Stumbras 6–0 Atlantas (28 October 2018); Sūduva 6–0 Atlantas (7 November 2018)
- Biggest away win: Jonava 0–6 Žalgiris (26 September 2018)
- Highest scoring: Atlantas 2–5 Žalgiris (11 April 2018); Atlantas 2–5 Sūduva (4 October 2018); Žalgiris 5–2 Kauno Žalgiris (7 November 2018)
- Longest winning run: 7 games Žalgiris
- Longest unbeaten run: 16 games Sūduva
- Longest winless run: 18 games Atlantas
- Longest losing run: 5 games Atlantas
- Highest attendance: 2,400; Sūduva v Žalgiris (27 June 2018)
- Lowest attendance: 50; Stumbras v Palanga (3 July 2018); Trakai v Kauno Žalgiris (23 August 2018); Jonava v Žalgiris (26 September 2018); Palanga v Stumbras (24 October 2018)
- Total attendance: 50,557
- Average attendance: 399
- All statistics correct as of 11 November 2018.

The 2018 A Lyga was the 29th season of the A Lyga, the top-tier association football league of Lithuania. The season began on 25 February 2018 and ended on 11 November 2018.

Sūduva Marijampolė began the season as defending champions having won their first league title last year. They secured a second consecutive title in ARVI Football Arena on 7 November, after they beaten Atlantas 6–0.

== Teams ==
=== Clubs and locations ===
Locations of the 2018 A Lyga teams

The following teams are competing in the 2018 championship:

Club	Location	Stadium	Turf	Capacity	2017 position
Atlantas	Klaipėda	Central Stadium of Klaipėda	Natural	4,428	5th
Atlantas	Klaipėda	Klaipėda Artificial Football Pitch	Artificial	1,000	5th
Jonava	Jonava	Central Stadium of Jonava	Natural	1,008	4th
Jonava	Jonava	Jonava Artificial Football Pitch	Artificial	558	4th
Kauno Žalgiris	Kaunas	Darius and Girėnas Stadium	Natural	9,180	8th
Kauno Žalgiris	Kaunas	NFA Stadium	Artificial	500	8th
Palanga	Palanga	Palanga Stadium	Natural	1,212	I Lyga, 1st
Palanga	Klaipėda^{SL}	Klaipėda Artificial Football Pitch	Artificial	1,000	I Lyga, 1st
Stumbras	Kaunas	Darius and Girėnas Stadium	Natural	9,180	7th
Stumbras	Kaunas	NFA Stadium	Artificial	500	7th
Sūduva	Marijampolė	ARVI Football Arena	Natural	6,250	1st
Sūduva	Marijampolė	ARVI Football Indoor Arena	Artificial	2,660	1st
Trakai	Vilnius	LFF Stadium	Artificial	5,067	3rd
Trakai	Vilnius	Sportima Arena	Artificial	3,157	3rd
Žalgiris	Vilnius	LFF Stadium	Artificial	5,067	2nd
Žalgiris	Vilnius	Sportima Arena	Artificial	3,157	2nd

Stadium location

=== Personnel and kits ===
Note: Flags indicate national team as has been defined under FIFA eligibility rules. Players and Managers may hold more than one non-FIFA nationality.

Team	Head coach	Captain	Kit manufacturer	Shirt sponsor
Atlantas	(Lithuania) Vacys Lekevičius (caretaker)	(Lithuania) Andrius Bartkus	Adidas	Marijampolės pieno konservai
Jonava	(Lithuania) Artūras Ramoška	(Lithuania) Tadas Eliošius (Note: Player left the club in the middle of the season.) (Lithuania) Laurynas Stonkus	Erreà	—
Kauno Žalgiris	(Lithuania) Mindaugas Čepas	(Lithuania) Aurimas Raginis	Hummel	BC Žalgiris
Palanga	(Lithuania) Valdas Trakys	(Lithuania) Gvidas Juška	Nike	—
Stumbras	(Portugal) Mariano Barreto	(Lithuania) Rimvydas Sadauskas	Joma	—
Sūduva	(Kazakhstan) Vladimir Cheburin	(Lithuania) Algis Jankauskas	Joma	Sumeda
Trakai	(Belarus) Albert Rybak (caretaker)	(Lithuania) Valdemaras Borovskis	Nike	Ecoil
Žalgiris	(Lithuania) Valdas Urbonas	(Lithuania) Georgas Freidgeimas	Nike	Top Sport

=== Managerial changes ===
Team	Outgoing manager	Manner of departure	Date of vacancy	Position in table	Incoming manager	Date of appointment
Žalgiris	(Belarus) Aleksandr Brazevich	End of contract	24 November 2017	Pre-season	(Lithuania) Aurelijus Skarbalius	27 November 2017
Jonava	(Lithuania) Mindaugas Čepas	End of contract	21 December 2017	Pre-season	(Lithuania) Darius Gvildys (caretaker)	21 December 2017
Atlantas	(Lithuania) Igoris Pankratjevas	Mutual consent	5 January 2018	Pre-season	(Lithuania) Algimantas Briaunys (caretaker)	5 January 2018
Kauno Žalgiris	(Northern Ireland) Johnny McKinstry	Mutual consent	5 January 2018	Pre-season	(Lithuania) Mindaugas Čepas	5 January 2018
Jonava	(Lithuania) Darius Gvildys	End of caretaker spell	12 January 2018	Pre-season	(Portugal) Filipe Ribeiro	12 January 2018
Jonava	(Portugal) Filipe Ribeiro	Sacked	15 May 2018	8th	(Lithuania) Darius Gvildys	15 May 2018
Trakai	(Russia) Oleg Vasilenko	Sacked	18 May 2018	3rd	(Lithuania) Virmantas Lemežis (caretaker)	18 May 2018
Atlantas	(Lithuania) Algimantas Briaunys	End of caretaker spell	1 June 2018	4th	(Russia) Anatoli Shelest	1 June 2018
Trakai	(Lithuania) Virmantas Lemežis	End of caretaker spell	18 June 2018	3rd	(Spain) Kibu Vicuña	18 June 2018
Atlantas	(Russia) Anatoli Shelest	Sacked	21 June 2018	5th	(Lithuania) Algimantas Briaunys (caretaker)	3 August 2018
Žalgiris	(Lithuania) Aurelijus Skarbalius	Sacked	21 June 2018	2nd	(Lithuania) Valdas Urbonas	23 June 2018
Jonava	(Lithuania) Darius Gvildys	Mutual consent	12 July 2018	8th	(Lithuania) Artūras Ramoška	12 January 2018
Atlantas	(Lithuania) Algimantas Briaunys	Resigned	30 August 2018	6th	(Lithuania) Tadas Labukas (caretaker)	6 September 2018
Atlantas	(Lithuania) Tadas Labukas	End of caretaker spell	13 September 2018	6th	(Russia) Anatoli Shelest	13 September 2018
Trakai	(Spain) Kibu Vicuña	Signed by Wisła Płock	11 October 2018	4th	(Belarus) Albert Rybak (caretaker)	11 October 2018
Atlantas	(Russia) Anatoli Shelest	Mutual consent	24 October 2018	6th	(Lithuania) Vacys Lekevičius (caretaker)	24 October 2018

== Regular season ==
=== Table ===
Pos	Team	Pld	W	D	L	GF	GA	GD	Pts	Qualification or relegation
1	Sūduva	28	21	4	3	59	16	+43	67	Qualification to Championship round
2	Žalgiris	28	19	5	4	60	20	+40	62	Qualification to Championship round
3	Stumbras	28	13	6	9	36	25	+11	45	Qualification to Championship round
4	Trakai	28	11	9	8	37	26	+11	42	Qualification to Championship round
5	Kauno Žalgiris	28	10	5	13	22	31	−9	35	Qualification to Championship round
6	Atlantas	28	6	5	17	26	55	−29	23	Qualification to Championship round
7	Palanga (O)	28	5	5	18	17	58	−41	20	Qualification to Relegation play-offs
8	Jonava (R)	28	4	7	17	24	50	−26	19	Relegation to I Lyga

Source: A Lyga (in Lithuanian), UEFA, Soccerway
Rules for classification: 1) Points; 2) Head-to-head points; 3) Head-to-head goal difference; 4) Head-to-head goals scored; 5) Head-to-head matches won; 6) Goal difference; 7) Goals scored; 8) Matches won.
(O) Play-off winners; (R) Relegated

=== Results ===
==== First half of season ====
Home \ Away	ATL	JON	KŽA	PAL	STU	SŪD	TRA	ŽAL
Atlantas	—	1–0	0–1	1–1	0–0	0–3	0–2	2–5
Jonava	1–1	—	0–1	4–0	0–2	0–0	0–0	1–2
Kauno Žalgiris	2–3	1–0	—	0–0	0–1	0–3	1–4	0–0
Palanga	0–2	1–1	1–0	—	0–2	0–2	1–1	1–2
Stumbras	0–2	4–0	0–2	0–1	—	0–1	0–2	0–0
Sūduva	2–1	4–2	4–1	2–0	2–0	—	0–0	0–0
Trakai	0–1	1–1	2–0	3–1^{RV}	1–1	1–4	—	0–1
Žalgiris	3–1	1–2	2–0	4–0	1–1	2–3	3–2	—

Source: A Lyga (in Lithuanian)
Legend: Blue = home team win; Yellow = draw; Red = away team win.

==== Second half of season ====
Home \ Away	ATL	JON	KŽA	PAL	STU	SŪD	TRA	ŽAL
Atlantas	—	1–1	0–1	1–1	1–3	2–5	0–2	1–5
Jonava	2–1	—	0–2	3–1	1–3	1–2	1–3	0–6
Kauno Žalgiris	4–0	1–1	—	2–0	0–2	1–0	1–1	0–1
Palanga	2–0	3–1	0–1	—	1–5	1–4	1–0^{RV}	0–5
Stumbras	2–1	3–0	0–0	2–0	—	1–2	1–0	0–2
Sūduva	3–0	2–0	1–0	5–0	3–0	—	0–0	0–1
Trakai	1–2	1–0	1–0	3–0	2–2	1–2	—	1–0
Žalgiris	3–1	2–1	4–0	2–0	0–1	1–0	2–2	—

Source: A Lyga (in Lithuanian)
Legend: Blue = home team win; Yellow = draw; Red = away team win.

== Championship round ==
=== Table ===
Pos	Team	Pld	W	D	L	GF	GA	GD	Pts	Qualification or relegation
1	Sūduva (C)	33	24	5	4	72	20	+52	77	Qualification to Champions League first qualifying round
2	Žalgiris	33	23	6	4	70	23	+47	75	Qualification to Europa League first qualifying round
3	Trakai	33	14	9	10	46	29	+17	51 (Note: Trakai ahead of Stumbras on head-to-head points record; Trakai 8, Stumbras 5.)	Qualification to Europa League first qualifying round
4	Stumbras	33	15	6	12	45	35	+10	51	
5	Kauno Žalgiris	33	11	6	16	29	41	−12	39	Qualification to Europa League first qualifying round
6	Atlantas	33	6	6	21	28	75	−47	24	

Source: A Lyga (in Lithuanian), UEFA, Soccerway
Rules for classification: 1) Points; 2) Head-to-head points; 3) Head-to-head goal difference; 4) Head-to-head goals scored; 5) Head-to-head matches won; 6) Goal difference; 7) Goals scored; 8) Matches won.
(C) Champions

=== Results ===
Home \ Away	ATL	KŽA	STU	SŪD	TRA	ŽAL
Atlantas	—	1–3	—	—	1–5	—
Kauno Žalgiris	—	—	1–2	1–1	—	—
Stumbras	6–0	—	—	1–4	0–3	—
Sūduva	6–0	—	—	—	1–0	1–2
Trakai	—	1–0	—	—	—	0–1
Žalgiris	0–0	5–2	2–0	—	—	—

Source: A Lyga (in Lithuanian)
Legend: Blue = home team win; Yellow = draw; Red = away team win.

== Relegation play-offs ==
The 7th placed team faced the runners-up of the 2018 LFF I Lyga for a two-legged play-off. The winner on aggregate score after both matches earned entry into the 2019 A Lyga.

=== First leg ===
28 October 2018
16:00 EET (UTC+2)

DFK Dainava	0–3	Palanga
	Summary; Video	Aniefiok 15', 28'; Dombrauskis 47'

Alytus Stadium, Alytus, Lithuania
Attendance: 1,520
Referee: Gediminas Mažeika

=== Second leg ===
3 November 2018
13:00 EET (UTC+2)

Palanga	2–0	DFK Dainava
Juška 49'; Urbys 70'	Summary; Video

Gargždai Stadium, Gargždai, Lithuania
Attendance: 400
Referee: Manfredas Lukjančukas

Palanga won 5–0 on aggregate and therefore both clubs remain in their respective leagues.

== Positions by round ==
The table lists the positions of teams after each week of matches. In order to preserve chronological progress, any postponed matches are not included in the round at which they were originally scheduled, but added to the full round they were played immediately afterwards. For example, if a match is scheduled for matchday 13, but then postponed and played between days 16 and 17, it will be added to the standings for day 16.

Leader – Qualification to Champions League first qualifying round
Qualification to Europa League first qualifying round
Qualification to relegation play-offs
Relegation to 2019 I Lyga

Team \ Round	1	2	3	4	5	6	7	8	9	10	11	12	13	14	15	16	17	18	19	20	21	22	23	24	25	26	27	28	29	30	31	32	33
Sūduva	1	1	1	1	1	1	1	1	1	1	1	1	1	1	1	1	1	1	1	1	1	1	1	1	1	1	1	1	1	1	1	1	1
Žalgiris	1	2	2	2	3	2	2	2	2	2	2	2	2	2	2	2	2	2	2	2	2	2	2	2	2	2	2	2	2	2	2	2	2
Trakai	6	4	4	3	4	4	3	3	3	3	3	3	3	3	3	3	3	3	4	4	4	4	4	4	4	4	3	4	4	4	4	3	3
Stumbras	7	7	7	8	7	5	6	7	7	7	6	7	7	5	5	5	4	4	3	3	3	3	3	3	3	3	4	3	3	3	3	4	4
Kauno Žalgiris	7	8	5	5	5	7	7	8	8	8	7	5	5	6	7	7	7	6	6	5	5	5	5	5	5	5	5	5	5	5	5	5	5
Atlantas	3	3	3	4	2	3	5	6	4	4	4	4	4	4	4	4	5	5	5	6	6	6	6	6	6	6	6	6	6	6	6	6	6
Palanga	4	6	8	7	8	6	4	5	6	6	5	6	6	7	6	6	6	7	7	7	7	7	7	7	8	7	7	7					
Jonava	4	5	6	6	6	8	8	4	5	5	8	8	8	8	8	8	8	8	8	8	8	8	8	8	7	8	8	8					

Updated to games played on 11 November 2018

== Season statistics ==
=== Top scorers ===
Rank	Pos.	Player	Club	Goals	MP	APG
1	MF	(Romania) Liviu Antal	Žalgiris	23	2065	90
2	MF	(Brazil) Marcos Júnior	Stumbras	17	2097	124
3	MF	(Lithuania) Donatas Kazlauskas	Atlantas/Trakai	12	1796	150
4	FW	(Nigeria) Ogana Louis	Žalgiris	11	1643	150
5	MF	(Chile) Gerson Acevedo	Sūduva	10	1719	172
6	MF	(Lithuania) Ovidijus Verbickas	Sūduva	9	1858	207
7	FW	(Austria) Sandro Gotal	Sūduva	8	644	81
7	FW	(Slovakia) Tomáš Malec	Žalgiris	8	1546	194
7	FW	(Curaçao) Rigino Cicilia	Sūduva	8	1588	199
7	FW	(Lithuania) Laurynas Stonkus	Jonava	8	2075	260

Updated to games played on 11 November 2018

=== Top assists ===
Rank	Pos.	Player	Club	Assists
1	MF	(Austria) Tomáš Šimkovič	Žalgiris	15
2	DF	(Croatia) Andro Švrljuga	Sūduva	8
3	FW	(Nigeria) Ogana Louis	Žalgiris	7
4	MF	(Brazil) Lucas Villela	Stumbras	6
5	MF	(South Africa) Kgaogelo Sekgota	Stumbras	5
5	MF	(France) Serge Nyuiadzi	Žalgiris	5
5	DF	(Lithuania) Vaidas Slavickas	Sūduva	5
5	MF	(Lithuania) Ovidijus Verbickas	Sūduva	5

Updated to games played on 11 November 2018

=== Clean sheets ===
Rank	Player	Club	Clean sheets	GP
1	(Croatia) Ivan Kardum	Sūduva	17	33
2	(Lithuania) Džiugas Bartkus	Žalgiris	12	21
2	(Lithuania) Tomas Švedkauskas	Trakai	12	23
2	(Brazil) Rodrigo Josviaki	Stumbras	12	30
5	(Lithuania) Martynas Matuzas	Kauno Žalgiris	7	20

Updated to games played on 11 November 2018

=== Hat-tricks ===
Player	For	Against	Result	Date	Ref
(Slovakia) Tomáš Malec	Žalgiris	Trakai	3–2 (H)	7 April 2018	
(Lithuania) Linas Pilibaitis	Kauno Žalgiris	Atlantas	4–0 (H)	28 August 2018	
(Romania) Liviu Antal	Žalgiris	Palanga	0–5 (A)	29 August 2018	
(Brazil) Marcos Júnior	Stumbras	Jonava	3–0 (H)	4 October 2018	
(Romania) Liviu Antal	Žalgiris	Kauno Žalgiris	5–2 (H)	7 November 2018	
(Austria) Sandro Gotal	Sūduva	Atlantas	6–0 (H)	7 November 2018	

=== Discipline ===
==== Player ====
- Most yellow cards: 9
  - (Croatia) Slavko Blagojević (Žalgiris)
- Most red cards: 2
  - (Lithuania) Linas Klimavičius (Žalgiris)

==== Club ====
- Most yellow cards: 68
  - Kauno Žalgiris
- Most red cards: 5
  - Žalgiris

== Attendance ==
Pos	Team	Total	High	Low	Average	Change
1	Sūduva	16,740	2,400	450	985	−9.6%
2	Žalgiris	10,530	2,000	100	620	−13.6%
3	Jonava	5,160	850	50	369	+10.1%
4	Trakai	4,947	1,000	50	310	+13.6%
5	Atlantas	4,120	700	70	258	−41.9%
6	Palanga	2,980	500	50	213	+0.9%^{1}
7	Stumbras	3,220	500	50	190	−7.8%
8	Kauno Žalgiris	2,860	450	80	179	+1.1%
	League total	50,577	2,400	50	399	−16.5%

Updated to games played on 11 November 2018
Source: A Lyga, Lietuvos Futbolas
Notes:
1: Team played last season in the I Lyga

== Awards ==
=== Yearly awards ===
==== Individual ====
Awards were presented at the Lithuanian Football Awards ceremony, which was held on 21 February 2019. Finalists for voted awards were announced after the season and winners were presented at the award ceremony.

2018 A Lyga awards
Award	Recipient(s)
Player of the Year	Ovidijus Verbickas (Sūduva)
Young Player of the Year	Justinas Marazas (Trakai)
Manager of the Year	Vladimir Cheburin (Sūduva)
Golden Boot	Liviu Antal (Žalgiris)

==== Team of the Year ====
Goalkeeper	Defenders	Midfielders	Forwards	Rf
(Croatia) Kardum (Sūduva)	(Netherlands) Slijngard (Žalgiris) (Serbia) Tomić (Žalgiris) (Lithuania) Jankauskas (Sūduva) (Croatia) Švrljuga (Sūduva)	(Lithuania) Kazlauskas (Atlantas/Trakai) (Austria) Offenbacher (Sūduva) (Austria) Šimkovič (Žalgiris) (Brazil) Júnior (Stumbras)	(Romania) Antal (Žalgiris) (Nigeria) Ogana (Žalgiris)	

=== Monthly awards ===
==== Individual ====
Player of the Month
Month	Player	Stats	Rf
March	Karolis Laukžemis (Sūduva)	4GP, 3G, 1A	
April	Ovidijus Verbickas (Sūduva)	5GP, 5G	
May	Liviu Antal (Žalgiris)	5GP, 4G, 1A	
June & July	Marcos Júnior (Stumbras)	3GP, 2G	
August	Liviu Antal (Žalgiris)	3GP, 7G, 1A	
September & October	Tomáš Šimkovič (Žalgiris)	9GP, 4G, 4A	

Young Player of the Month
Month	Player	Stats	Rf
March	Wasn't announced		
April	Justinas Marazas (Trakai)	5GP, 3G	
May	Kgaogelo Sekgota (Stumbras)	5GP, 1G, 2A	
June & July	Edvinas Kloniūnas (Kauno Žalgiris)	4GP, 1G	
August	Levan Matcharashvili (Stumbras)	5GP, 1A	
September & October	Ernestas Mockus (Kauno Žalgiris)	4GP, 1A	

Coach of the Month
Month	Player	Win %	Rf
March	Vladimir Cheburin (Sūduva)	4GP, 75%	
April	Vladimir Cheburin (Sūduva)	5GP, 80%	
May	Aurelijus Skarbalius (Žalgiris)	5GP, 80%	
June & July	Mariano Barreto (Stumbras)	3GP, 100%	
August	Valdas Urbonas (Žalgiris)	3GP, 100%	
September & October	Vladimir Cheburin (Sūduva)	10GP, 70%	

==== Team of the Month ====
Team of the Month
Month	Goalkeeper	Defenders	Midfielders	Forwards
March	(Lithuania) Bartkus (Žalgiris)	(Lithuania) Slavickas (Sūduva) (Lithuania) Klimavičius (Žalgiris) (Lithuania) Artimavičius (Atlantas) (Lithuania) Baravykas (Žalgiris)	(Lithuania) Veliulis (Jonava) (Austria) Šimkovič (Žalgiris) (Lithuania) Vorobjovas (Trakai) (Croatia) Švrljuga (Sūduva)	(Lithuania) Laukžemis (Sūduva) (Chile) Acevedo (Sūduva)
April	(Croatia) Kardum (Sūduva)	(São Tomé and Príncipe) Nazaré (Stumbras) (Lithuania) Jankauskas (Sūduva) (Lithuania) Januševskij (Trakai) (Croatia) Švrljuga (Sūduva)	(Belgium) Koç (Atlantas) (Moldova) Zasavițchi (Jonava) (Lithuania) Verbickas (Sūduva) (Romania) Antal (Žalgiris)	(Belgium) Mukanya (Trakai) (Lithuania) Juška (Palanga)
May	(Lithuania) Mikelionis (Kauno Žalgiris)	(Lithuania) Mikoliūnas (Žalgiris) (Lithuania) Snapkauskas (Kauno Žalgiris) (Bosnia and Herzegovina) Kerla (Sūduva) (Croatia) Švrljuga (Sūduva)	(South Africa) Sekgota (Stumbras) (France) N'Diaye (Sūduva) (Austria) Šimkovič (Žalgiris) (Lithuania) Urbys (Palanga)	(Croatia) Tadić (Sūduva) (Romania) Antal (Žalgiris)
June & July	(Lithuania) Bartkus (Žalgiris)	(São Tomé and Príncipe) Nazaré (Stumbras) (Portugal) Almeida (Stumbras) (Lithuania) Sadauskas (Stumbras) (Croatia) Švrljuga (Sūduva)	(Romania) Antal (Žalgiris) (Lithuania) Pilibaitis (Kauno Žalgiris) (Portugal) Cá (Stumbras) (Lithuania) Kloniūnas (Kauno Žalgiris) (Brazil) Júnior (Stumbras)	(Curaçao) Cicilia (Sūduva)
August	(Lithuania) Bartkus (Žalgiris)	(Netherlands) Slijngard (Žalgiris) (Russia) Osipov (Trakai) (Senegal) Mbodj (Žalgiris) (Lithuania) Baravykas (Žalgiris)	(Lithuania) Kazlauskas (Trakai) (Lithuania) Pilibaitis (Kauno Žalgiris (Romania) Antal (Žalgiris) (Brazil) Júnior (Stumbras)	(Brazil) Thuique (Jonava) (Nigeria) Ogana (Žalgiris)
September & October	(Lithuania) Švedkauskas (Trakai)	(Portugal) Floro (Stumbras) (Lithuania) Jankauskas (Sūduva) (Senegal) Mbodj (Žalgiris) (Croatia) Švrljuga (Sūduva)	(Lithuania) Sirgėdas (Kauno Žalgiris) (Austria) Offenbacher (Sūduva (Austria) Šimkovič (Žalgiris) (Brazil) Júnior (Stumbras)	(Austria) Gotal (Sūduva) (Nigeria) Ogana (Žalgiris)

Multiple appearances
Player	Club	App
(Croatia) Andro Švrljuga	Sūduva	4
(Romania) Liviu Antal	Žalgiris	4
(Lithuania) Džiugas Bartkus	Žalgiris	3
(Austria) Tomáš Šimkovič	Žalgiris	3
(Brazil) Marcos Júnior	Stumbras	3
(São Tomé and Príncipe) Jardel Nazaré	Stumbras	2
(Lithuania) Rolandas Baravykas	Žalgiris	2
(Lithuania) Linas Pilibaitis	Kauno Žalgiris	2
(Lithuania) Algis Jankauskas	Sūduva	2
(Senegal) Mamadou Mbodj	Žalgiris	2
(Nigeria) Ogana Louis	Žalgiris	2
