= 2008 A Lyga =

A Lyga
- Season: 2008
- Dates: 29 March-10 November
- Champions: FK Ekranas
- Relegated: FK Silute
- UEFA Champions League: FK Ekranas
- UEFA Europa League: FBK Kaunas; FK Suduva; FK Vetra
- Top goalscorer: (Brazil) Rafael Gaúcho (14 goals)

The Lithuanian A Lyga 2008 was the 19th season of top-tier football in Lithuania. The season started on 29 March 2008 and ended on 16 November 2008.

The league had to reduce the number of its teams from ten to nine prior to this season due to lacking of team able to earn promotion (see below). Shortly before the start of the season, Vilnius withdrew from participating in the league because of unknown reasons, leaving the league with 8 competing teams.

== Clubs ==
Location of teams in the A Lyga 2008

Club	Location	Stadium	Capacity
Atlantas	Klaipėda	Žalgiris Stadium	5,000
Ekranas	Panevėžys	Aukštaitija Stadium	9,940
FBK Kaunas	Kaunas	S.Dariaus ir S.Girėno Stadium	8,500
Sūduva	Marijampolė	Sūduva Stadium	4,000
Šiauliai	Šiauliai	Savivaldybė Stadium	2,430
Šilutė	Šilutė	Šilutė Stadium	3,000
Vėtra	Vilnius	Vėtra Stadium	5,900
Žalgiris	Vilnius	Žalgiris Stadium	15,030

== Promotion and relegation ==
Interas-AE Visaginas were relegated to the Lithuanian First League after finishing the 2007 season in last place with only 8 points. Šilutė were originally scheduled to play the 2nd placed team of the First League, Rodiklis Kaunas, in a relegation play-off, but Rodiklis declined promotion due to lacking financial capabilities.

First League champions Alytis Alytus also had to forfeit their place in this year's league because their ground was not suitable for top-tier football, so no team was promoted.

== League standings ==
Pos	Team	Pld	W	D	L	GF	GA	GD	Pts	Qualification or relegation
1	Ekranas (C)	28	20	5	3	46	12	+34	65	Qualification to Champions League second qualifying round
2	FBK Kaunas	28	16	7	5	51	17	+34	55	Qualification to Europa League second qualifying round
3	Vėtra	28	14	6	8	33	24	+9	48 (Note: VET: 7 pts, 5–3; SUD: 4 pts, 3–5)	Qualification to Europa League first qualifying round
4	Sūduva	28	14	6	8	35	25	+10	48	Qualification to Europa League second qualifying round (Note: Sūduva won the 2008–09 Lithuanian Football Cup and thereby qualified for the second qualifying round of the UEFA Europa League.)
5	Žalgiris	28	6	10	12	27	41	−14	28 (Note: ŽAL: 5 pts, 7–6; ATL: 5 pts, 6–7)	
6	Atlantas	28	7	7	14	31	44	−13	28	
7	Šiauliai	28	5	9	14	24	41	−17	24	
8	Šilutė (R)	28	3	4	21	19	62	−43	13	Relegation to I Lyga

Source: www2.omnitel.net
Rules for classification: 1) points; 2) head-to-head points; 3) head-to-head goal difference; 4) head-to-head goals scored; 5) goal difference; 6) number of goals scored.
(C) Champions; (R) Relegated

== Results ==
Every team played each other four times, twice at home and twice on the road, for a total of 28 games.

=== First half of season ===
Home \ Away	ATL	EKR	FBK	SŪD	ŠIA	ŠLT	VĖT	ŽAL
Atlantas		1–1	1–1	0–1	0–1	2–0	1–0	2–2
Ekranas	1–0		1–0	1–0	1–0	4–0	1–1	1–0
FBK Kaunas	4–0	0–3		3–0	2–0	3–0	1–2	2–0
Sūduva	3–1	2–1	0–0		1–0	2–1	3–0	0–0
Šiauliai	1–1	0–2	0–0	0–1		3–0	0–2	1–1
Šilutė	2–4	0–1	0–6	1–1	2–2		1–3	0–2
Vėtra	0–0	0–1	1–1	3–0	2–2	2–1		1–1
Žalgiris	0–0	1–1	0–2	0–1	1–1	1–1	1–0	

Source: www2.omnitel.net
Legend: Blue = home team win; Yellow = draw; Red = away team win.

=== Second half of season ===
Home \ Away	ATL	EKR	FBK	SŪD	ŠIA	ŠLT	VĖT	ŽAL
Atlantas		0–1	1–2	1–0	1–2	2–1	0–1	3–0 (Note: The game from Round 25 was awarded to Atlantas with a score of 3–0 because Žalgiris did not field a team for the match.)
Ekranas	3–0		2–1	2–1	1–1	1–0	0–1	5–1
FBK Kaunas	2–0	2–0		1–0	1–0	4–0	2–3	5–0
Sūduva	3–2	0–0	1–2		3–0	4–0	0–0	1–1
Šiauliai	4–4	0–5	0–0	0–2		0–1	2–0	0–2
Šilutė	1–2	0–3	1–1	1–2	2–0		0–1	1–2
Vėtra	2–1	0–2	0–2	2–0	1–0	4–0		1–0
Žalgiris	5–1	0–1	1–1	2–3	2–4	0–2	1–0	

Source: www2.omnitel.net
Legend: Blue = home team win; Yellow = draw; Red = away team win.

== Top goalscorers ==
Source: lfe.lt (in Lithuanian)

Pos.	Player	Club	Goals
1	(Brazil) Rafael Gaúcho	FBK Kaunas	14
2	(Lithuania) Mindaugas Grigalevičius	FBK Kaunas	12
3	(Lithuania) Povilas Lukšys	Sūduva	11
4	(Lithuania) Vitalijus Kavaliauskas	Ekranas	8
5	(Lithuania) Darius Maciulevičius	Sūduva	7
6	(Lithuania) Egidijus Varnas	Ekranas	6
6	(Lithuania) Valdas Trakys	Ekranas	6
6	(Latvia) Ivans Lukjanovs	Šiauliai / Sūduva	6
