= Donatas Kazlauskas =

Lithuanian footballer

Personal information
- Date of birth: 31 March 1994 (age 32)
- Place of birth: Kretinga, Lithuania
- Height: 1.76 m (5 ft 9 1/2 in)
- Position: Winger

Team information
- Current team: Hegelmann
- Number: 39

Youth career
- 2001–2008: FK Minija
- 2008–2010: Nacionalinė Futbolo Akademija

Senior career*
Years	Team	Apps	(Gls)
2011	NFA Aisčiai Kaunas	11	(1)
2011–2012	Atletas Kaunas	5	(3)
2012	Žalgiris Vilnius	7	(1)
2012–2013	FK NFA		(11)
2013–2015	Atlantas	53	(19)
2015–2017	Lechia Gdańsk	1	(0)
2015	→ Olimpia Grudziądz (loan)	3	(0)
2016	→ Atlantas (loan)	31	(2)
2017–2018	Atlantas	36	(4)
2018–2020	Riteriai	58	(23)
2020–2021	Lviv	13	(0)
2021	Academica Clinceni	9	(0)
2022–2023	Žalgiris	48	(12)
2024	Šiauliai	24	(2)
2025–	Hegelmann	50	(3)

International career^{‡}
2009	Lithuania U15	2	(0)
2009–2011	Lithuania U17	25	(3)
2010–2012	Lithuania U18	11	(3)
2011–2013	Lithuania U19	18	(3)
2013–2016	Lithuania U21	16	(4)
2014–	Lithuania	34	(2)
- * Club domestic league appearances and goals as of 3 August 2026 ‡ National team caps and goals as of 31 March 2024

Donatas Kazlauskas (born 31 March 1994) is a Lithuanian professional footballer who plays as a winger for TOPLYGA club Hegelmann.

== Club career ==
On 6 January 2015, Kazlauskas joined Lechia Gdańsk on three-and-a-half-year contract, but his contract was terminated after two years.

=== FC Hegelmann ===
On 22 January 2025, Kazlauskas signed with Hegelmann.

== Career statistics ==
=== Club ===
As of match played 17 September 2023

Appearances and goals by club, season and competition
Club	Season	League			National cup (Note: Includes Lithuanian Cup, Polish Cup)		Continental		Other		Total	
Club	Season	Division	Apps	Goals	Apps	Goals	Apps	Goals	Apps	Goals	Apps	Goals
Žalgiris	2012	A Lyga	7	1	1	0	—		—		8	1
Atlantas	2013	A Lyga	30	7	1	0	—		—		31	7
Atlantas	2014	A Lyga	23	12	2	0	4 (Note: Appearance(s) in the UEFA Europa League)	0	—		29	12
Atlantas	Total		53	19	3	0	4	0	—		60	19
Lechia Gdańsk	2014–15	Ekstraklasa	1	0	0	0	—		—		1	0
Olimpia Grudziądz (loan)	2015–16	I liga	3	0	1	0	—		—		4	0
Atlantas (loan)	2016	A Lyga	31	2	3	0	2	0	—		36	2
Atlantas	2017	A Lyga	25	1	1	0	2	0	—		28	1
Atlantas	2018	A Lyga	11	3	0	0	0	0	—		11	3
Atlantas	Total		36	4	1	0	2	0	—		39	4
Riteriai	2018	A Lyga	13	9	1	0	6	1	—		20	10
Riteriai	2019	A Lyga	29	12	0	0	2	0	—		31	12
Riteriai	2020	A Lyga	16	2	1	0	2	1	—		19	3
Riteriai	Total		58	23	2	0	10	2	—		70	25
Lviv	2020–21	Ukrainian Premier League	13	0	0	0	—		—		13	0
Academica Clinceni	2021–22	Liga I	9	0	—		—		—		9	0
Žalgiris	2022	A Lyga	26	6	4	1	11 (Note: Six appearances in UEFA Champions League, one appearance in UEFA Europa League, four appearances in UEFA Europa Conference League)	0	1 (Note: Appearance in Lithuanian Supercup)	0	42	7
Žalgiris	2023	A Lyga	22	6	2	0	5 (Note: Two appearances and one goal in UEFA Champions League, one appearance in UEFA Europa League, two appearances in UEFA Europa Conference League)	1	—		29	7
Žalgiris	Total		48	12	6	1	16	1	1	0	71	14
Career total			259	60	17	1	34	3	1	0	311	64

=== International ===
As of match played 7 September 2023

Appearances and goals by national team and year
National team	Year	Apps	Goals
Lithuania	2014	2	0
Lithuania	2015	2	0
Lithuania	2016	2	0
Lithuania	2017	0	0
Lithuania	2018	3	0
Lithuania	2019	5	1
Lithuania	2020	7	1
Lithuania	2021	10	0
Lithuania	2022	2	0
Lithuania	2023	1	0
Total		34	2

Scores and results list Lithuania's goal tally first, score column indicates score after each Kazlauskas goal.

List of international goals scored by Donatas Kazlauskas
No.	Date	Venue	Opponent	Score	Result	Competition
1	14 October 2019	LFF Stadium, Vilnius, Lithuania	Serbia	1–2	1–2	UEFA Euro 2020 qualification
2	7 September 2020	Arena Kombëtare, Tirana, Albania	Albania	1–0	1–0	2020–21 UEFA Nations League

== Honours ==
Žalgiris

- A Lyga: 2022
- Lithuanian Cup: 2011–12, 2022

Lithuania

- Baltic Cup: runner-up 2016

Individual

- Young Lithuanian Footballer of the Year: 2014
- A Lyga Team of the Year: 2018
