= Algis Mackevičius =

Lithuanian footballer

Personal information
- Full name: Algimantas Antanovich Mackevičius
- Date of birth: 28 May 1958 (age 68)
- Place of birth: Vilnius, Lithuania
- Height: 1.79 m (5 ft 10 in)
- Position: Midfielder

Senior career*
Years	Team	Apps	(Gls)
1976–1988	Žalgiris	321	(41)
1988	Atlantas	19	(1)
1989	Jagiellonia Białystok	5	(0)
Total		345	(42)
- * Club domestic league appearances and goals

Algimantas Antanovich Mackevičius (born 28 May 1958) is a Lithuanian former professional footballer who played as a midfielder.

== Career ==
Mackevičius started his career with Soviet third tier side Žalgiris, helping them earn promotion to the Soviet top flight and achieve 3rd place. In 1989, Mackevičius signed for Jagiellonia Białystok in the Polish top flight, where he made 5 league appearances before leaving due to injury and financial problems. On 29 July 1989, he made his debut for Jagiellonia in a 1–1 draw with Zagłębie Sosnowiec.
