= 2005 Lithuanian football leagues =

LFF Lyga
- Season: 2005

Final tables of Lithuanian Championship of 2005 are presented below. The Lithuanian Football Federation (LFF) organized three football leagues: A Lyga (the highest), 1 Lyga (second-tier), and 2 Lyga (third-tier), which comprised three regional zones - one less than the previous season.

== A Lyga ==
Pos	Team	Pld	W	D	L	GF	GA	GD	Pts	Qualification
1	Ekranas (C)	36	29	5	2	87	23	+64	92	Qualification to Champions League first qualifying round
2	FBK Kaunas	36	26	4	6	89	25	+64	82	Qualification to UEFA Cup first qualifying round
3	Sūduva	36	16	11	9	67	43	+24	59	Qualification to UEFA Cup first qualifying round
4	Vėtra	36	17	6	13	45	45	0	57	Qualification to Intertoto Cup first round
5	Vilnius	36	11	14	11	36	29	+7	47	
6	Šilutė	36	12	8	16	44	61	−17	44	
7	Atlantas	36	11	8	17	40	52	−12	41	
8	Žalgiris	36	11	8	17	40	52	−12	41	
9	Šiauliai	36	8	9	19	40	61	−21	33	
10	Nevėžis	36	0	5	31	18	115	−97	5	

Source: www2.omnitel.net
(C) Champions

== 1 Lyga ==
Pos	Team	Pld	W	D	L	GF	GA	GD	Pts
1	Alytis Alytus	34	25	6	3	92	21	+71	81
2	Kauno Jėgeriai	34	23	6	5	83	18	+65	75
3	Vėtra-2 Vilnius	34	21	8	5	70	20	+50	71
4	Polonija Vilnius	34	21	5	8	85	33	+52	68
5	Geležinis Vilkas Vilnius	34	18	7	9	66	41	+25	61
6	KFK Šiauliai-2	34	17	7	10	54	45	+9	58
7	LKKA ir Teledema Kaunas	34	17	6	11	67	46	+21	57
8	Sūduva-2 Marijampolė	34	16	7	11	57	38	+19	55
9	Lietava Jonava	34	17	4	13	63	48	+15	55
10	Kruoja Pakruojis	34	16	5	13	64	50	+14	53
11	Atletas Kaunas	34	13	5	16	49	45	+4	44
12	Babrungas Plungė	34	12	6	16	48	54	−6	42
13	Kuršiai Neringa	34	9	7	18	42	58	−16	34
14	Vilkmergė Ukmergė	34	8	8	18	34	60	−26	32
15	FK Vilnius-2	34	8	4	22	32	61	−29	28
16	Utenis Utena	34	9	1	24	40	115	−75	28
17	Tauras ir Erra Tauragė	34	7	6	21	45	83	−38	27
18	Rodovitas Klaipėda	34	0	0	34	19	174	−155	0

== 2 Lyga ==
=== 2 Lyga zone South ===
Pos	Team	Pld	W	D	L	GF	GA	GD	Pts	Qualification (Note: Table errors: 155 total wins != 154 total losses and 53 total draws is an odd number.)
1	Rodiklis Kaunas	26	24	2	0	87	19	+68	72 (Note: 2 points deducted?)	
2	Interas-AE Visaginas	26	21	3	2	76	18	+58	66	
3	SM Alytis-2 Alytus	26	15	3	8	57	34	+23	48	
4	SC Savingė Kaišiadorys	26	14	5	7	62	43	+19	47	
5	Sveikata Kybartai	26	13	7	6	46	37	+9	46	
6	FM Spyris Kaunas	26	13	3	10	44	43	+1	42	
7	Neris Karmėlava	26	12	2	12	50	44	+6	38	
8	Vidzgiris Alytus	26	10	6	10	45	41	+4	36	
9	SC Šilas Kazlų Rūda	25	9	3	13	46	49	−3	30	
10	Nevėžis-2 Kėdainiai	25	7	6	12	26	43	−17	27	
11	FK Anykščiai	25	5	6	14	22	42	−20	21	
12	Valdima SC Prienai	26	5	3	18	20	79	−59	18	
13	FK Kalvarija	26	4	4	18	24	61	−37	16	
14	SM Vienybė Ukmergė	27	3	0	24	17	69	−52	9	

=== 2 Lyga zone West ===
Pos	Team	Pld	W	D	L	GF	GA	GD	Pts
1	Atlantas-2 Klaipėda	22	19	2	1	90	17	+73	59
2	FK Šilutė-2	22	18	2	2	70	10	+60	56
3	Minija Kretinga	22	14	3	5	42	25	+17	45
4	Glestum Klaipėda	22	12	5	5	48	24	+24	41
5	Banga Gargždai	22	12	4	6	45	35	+10	40
6	GMT 83 Gargždai	22	11	4	7	53	29	+24	37
7	Sakuona Plikiai	22	8	5	9	40	42	−2	29
8	FK Pagėgiai	22	7	1	14	38	64	−26	22
9	Salantas Salantai	22	4	3	15	26	66	−40	15
10	Gintaras Palanga	22	5	0	17	30	65	−35	15
11	Švyturys Klaipėda	22	4	0	18	30	80	−50	12
12	Babrungas-2 Plungė	22	2	3	17	26	81	−55	9

=== 2 Lyga zone North ===
Pos	Team	Pld	W	D	L	GF	GA	GD	Pts
1	Kražantė Kelmė	18	14	1	3	59	26	+33	43
2	Ekranas-2 Panevėžys	18	13	1	4	45	23	+22	40
3	Juventa-99 Šiauliai	18	10	4	4	40	25	+15	34
4	FK Mažeikiai	18	9	1	8	43	32	+11	28
5	KFK Šiauliai-3	17	9	1	7	42	35	+7	28
6	Venta Kuršėnai	17	8	4	5	26	22	+4	28
7	Mastis Telšiai	18	6	2	10	21	27	−6	20
8	FK Šiauliai	18	4	4	10	22	51	−29	16
9	Rinkuškiai Biržai	18	4	2	12	27	43	−16	14
10	SC Akmenė	18	2	0	16	16	57	−41	6
