= Vaidas Slavickas =

Lithuanian footballer

Personal information
- Date of birth: 26 February 1986 (age 40)
- Place of birth: Marijampolė, Lithuania
- Height: 1.80 m (5 ft 11 in)
- Position: Defender

Team information
- Current team: Sūduva (assistant coach)

Senior career*
Years	Team	Apps	(Gls)
2005–2012	Sūduva	191	(8)
2013	FK Ekranas	30	(1)
2014–2015	Ceahlăul Piatra Neamț	24	(0)
2015–2022	Sūduva	159	(11)

International career
2008–2021	Lithuania	22	(0)

Managerial career
- 2023–: Sūduva (assistant)
- * Club domestic league appearances and goals

Vaidas Slavickas (born 26 February 1986) is a Lithuanian professional football coach and a former player who is an assistant coach for Sūduva.

== Honours ==
=== Club ===
Sūduva Marijampolė

- Lithuanian Championship: 2017, 2018
- Lithuanian Cup: 2006, 2009
- Lithuanian Supercup: 2009, 2018
