= FK Sūduva =

Lithuanian football club

Sūduva
- Full name: Football Club Sūduva
- Nickname: Sūduviečiai (Sudovians)
- Founded: 1942; 84 years ago
- Ground: Marijampolės Arena
- Capacity: 6,250
- Chairman: Karolis Skinkys
- Manager: Donatas Vencevičius
- League: TOPLYGA
- 2026: TOPLYGA, 2nd of 10
- Website: fksuduva.lt
Home colours	Away colours

FK Sūduva is a Lithuanian professional football club based in the city of Marijampolė. Founded in 1942, the club competes in the TOPLYGA, the top flight of Lithuanian football.

The club has been playing in the A Lyga since 2002. In 2006, the club won its first trophy – the Lithuanian Cup, a feat they repeated in 2009. In 2017, Sūduva won the A Lyga for the first time in its history, and repeated the triumph in 2018 and 2019.

The team's colours are white and red. The club plays at Marijampolė Arena in Marijampolė (capacity 6,250).

== Name history ==
- 1968 – Sūduva Kapsukas (from Suvalkija, a cultural region of Lithuania, and Kapsukas, former name of the city of Marijampolė)
- 1993 – Sūduva-Žydrius (after the Žydrius automotive parts company)
- 1994 – Sūduva Marijampolė

== History ==
=== Soviet times ===
Sūduva is one of the oldest and still functioning clubs in Lithuania. It is not so easy to trace its history, as in Soviet times it often changed names with every new owner that supported it. It is more or less agreed that officially this club has existed under the name of Sūduva since 1942.

During Soviet times it drifted between different local leagues, producing few footballers for the above-mentioned Žalgiris and slowly building a local football community. Football was also actively played in a few smaller towns around Marijampolė, thus making the community of football lovers even stronger. Actually, it was stronger than the club itself, and those who follow the team today are adding to the old tradition.

The biggest achievement of the club during Soviet times came in 1975 when Sūduva reached 3rd place at the local top division. The next year it played and lost the National Cup Final.

=== 1990–2001 ===
After the dissolution of the Soviet Union Sūduva got few chances to go up. It played the only Baltic championship in 1990 with teams from Lithuania, Latvia, and Estonia. Next year it tried the Lithuanian top division. Both efforts were terrible – Sūduva finished both championships as the last team collecting 7 points at the Baltic championship and only 2 at the Lithuanian league.

Later the team navigated between the 2nd and the 3rd divisions for some 10 years without decent funds or a truly professional attitude. The worst was the season of 1998 / 1999. The team started well at the 2nd division but left it after half a season because it had no funds. It was not the end. The football traditions were too strong.

The team recovered next season at the 3rd division, won it the following year, went up and won again. This rise continues up to this day.

=== 2002–present ===
The semi-professional team vanquished Brann from Norway during its first European match (3–2 both away and at home) and went to Glasgow to meet Celtic. This match was not so successful (actually, the result is still featured in the statistics of Celtic as one of the biggest victories in Europe).

Three more seasons at the middle of the table and the team reached 3rd place – 30 years after the achievement of the same caliber. Repeating that history, the club reached the finals of the National Cup the following year. Only this time the Cup went to Marijampolė.

Since that year Sūduva have been one of the most stable clubs of the country – both financially and on the league table. It reached 2nd position twice (2007 and 2010), 3rd position – three times (2009, 2011 and 2012) and won the National Cup one more time (2008). It went to play European cups every year receiving teams like Rapid, Red Bull and Club Brugge.

The year 2013 saw a new concept of the team. The budget was still stable but it went down. So the team expressed the wish to put more stress on integration of young local boys into the main team. Some important players of the earlier seasons left; a few foreign players came to stand along those who left and the new blood.

In the 2015 season, Sūduva started with a new head coach – Aleksandr Veselinovič. The new coach totally changed the team style from defending to attacking. In the last season game against Atlantas Sūduva needed at least a draw. Sūduva conceded a goal in the 86th minute and lost 3rd place to Atlantas.

Starting line-up for the 2018–19 UEFA Champions League qualifying phase and play-off round home match against APOEL FC won by FK Suduva 3–1.

At the beginning of the 2016 season, Sūduva recalled former team players Marius Činikas and Martynas Matuzas. Multiple A Lyga champions Algis Jankauskas, Andro Švrljuga and Paulius Janušauskas were signed as well. Also signed were Croatian goalkeeper Ivan Kardum, Serbian forward Admir Kecap, Bosnian-Herzegovinian defensive midfielder Nermin Jamak and Serbian midfielder Predrag Pavlović. Sūduva finished season 3rd, also played in the Cup final the same year.

In 2017, FK Sūduva became the first Lithuanian football club after Žalgiris Vilnius and FK Ekranas to pass three qualifying rounds in European competition in the 2017–18 Europa League. FK Sūduva eliminated Shakhtyor Soligorsk, FK Liepāja and FC Sion.

In the same season, for the first time, FK Sūduva won the A Lyga.

In 2018, FK Sūduva played in the 2018–19 UEFA Champions League. In the first round, Sūduva advanced over APOEL FC by scoring 3 consecutive goals in the first 18 minutes of play. In the second qualification round they lost to Red Star Belgrade. After that, they had a chance to play in the 2018–19 UEFA Europa League. They won against FK Spartaks Jūrmala in 3Q, but lost to Celtic Glasgow in the play-off stage. In the same season, Sūduva won the A Lyga the second time in a row.

In the 2019 season, become chempions of A Lyga, won LFF Cup and the Supercup . Despite the success, the club's main sponsors, ARVI Group announced on 11 December 2019 that it will no longer sponsor the Sūduva club. The ARVI Arena, the main football ground named after the sponsor, had the sponsor signboards removed and the stadium was renamed to Marijampolė Football Arena (at least temporarily until another sponsor appears). At the end of the season, Kazakh head coach Vladimir Cheburin announced his intentions to return to Kazakhstan, and did not renew his contract. Cheburin was attributed to a lot of club's success over the past 3 seasons.

In January 2020, Heimo Pfeifenberger became the new head coach, however amidst COVID-19 pandemic, Heimo's and the club's views on player salaries and remote training have become different, and on 14 April the club terminated the contract.

== Club crest ==
1968–2025

Since 2025

== Supporters ==
FK Sūduva supporters are called "Sūduvos Sakalai" (eng. Falcons of Sūduva).

== Kit ==
Traditional home kit are white colour with red signs.

Away kits are usually red. Shirts, shorts and socks. With white signs.

Goalkeepers kit was yellow colour with black signs and details (in 2018). In the 2019 season kits is light green (or black in alternative).

Joma is a kit sponsor since the 2014 season.

Home kit	Away kit	Alternative kit	2018 (GK kit)	2019 (GK kit)

=== Kit manufacturers and shirt sponsors ===
Period	Kit manufacturer	Shirt sponsor	Ref
2022	Joma	Hikvision	
2023	Joma	—	
2025	Joma	Mantinga	

== Stadium ==
In 2008, Sūduva moved to a new stadium in Marijampolė, the Marijampolės futbolo arena with a capacity of approximately 6,250 spectators. The stadium was built using funds from the European Union and opened on 6 July 2008. Beginning from the 2011 season, the stadium was named ARVI Football Arena after the sponsoring rights were bought by ARVI Enterprises Group. Near the arena you can find the roof-covered football field Marijampolė Football Indoor Arena, containing 2500 seats. There football can be played all year. There are two outdoor football fields near the arena as well.

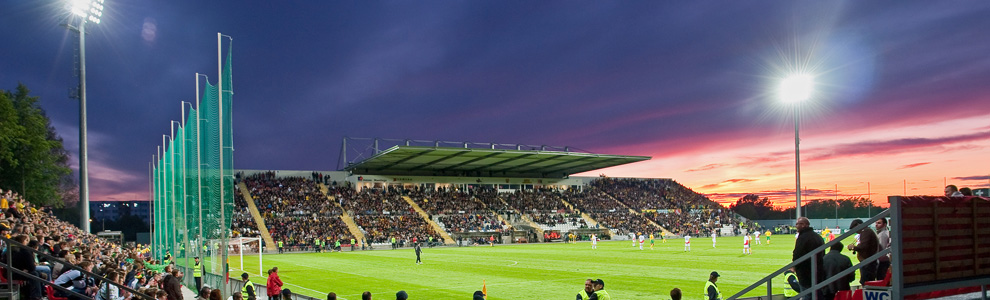
A panorama of ARVI Football Arena.

== Honours ==
Lithuanian Championship:

- A Lyga
  - 1st place (3): 2017, 2018, 2019
  - 2nd place (4): 2007, 2010, 2020, 2021
  - 3rd place (5): 2005, 2009, 2011, 2012, 2016
- Lithuanian Cup
  - Winners (3): 2006, 2008–09, 2019
  - Runners-up (4): 1976, 2002, 2016, 2020
- Lithuanian Supercup
  - Winners (4): 2009, 2018, 2019, 2022
  - Runners-up (2): 2007, 2020

Soviet Championship:

- Lithuanian SSR Championship
  - 3rd place (1): 1975

=== Continental ===
- Baltic League*
  - Runners-up (1): 2009–10

== Current squad ==
As of 10 September, 2026

Note: Flags indicate national team as defined under FIFA eligibility rules; some limited exceptions apply. Players may hold more than one non-FIFA nationality.

No.	Pos.	Nation	Player
4	DF	NGR	Henry Uzochukwu
5	DF	LTU	Žygimantas Baltrūnas
6	MF	NGR	Amadou Sabo
7	FW	SEN	Ibrahima Seck (on loan from (Poland) Raków Częstochowa)
8	MF	TOG	Steve Lawson
9	FW	NGR	Lucky Tom
10	FW	AFG	Omran Haydary
11	MF	BEL	Moutir Chajia
12	GK	LTU	Giedrius Zenkevičius
14	FW	LTU	Faustas Steponavičius
15	DF	SRB	Aleksandar Živanović
16	DF	UKR	Yegor Tsykalo
18	MF	LTU	Titas Milašius
20	MF	JPN	Yusuke Omori

No.	Pos.	Nation	Player
21	MF	CMR	Emmanuel Agbor (on loan from (Poland) Miedź Legnica)
23	DF	GEO	Rati Grigalava
26	MF	LTU	Domantas Antanavičius
29	DF	LTU	Markas Beneta
31	GK	LTU	Ignas Plūkas
46	MF	LTU	Ignas Skamarakas
66	GK	LTU	Rokas Pačėsa
75	DF	LTU	Ernestas Stočkūnas
77	MF	LTU	Pijus Bičkauskas
80	DF	UKR	Yevhen Yefremov
87	DF	LTU	Dominykas Pudžemys
94	MF	FRA	Sidy Sanokho

=== Notable players ===
Players who have either appeared for their respective national team at any time or received an individual award while at the club. Players whose name is listed in bold represented their countries while playing for FK Sūduva.

Lithuania

- (Lithuania) Džiugas Bartkus
- (Lithuania) Ričardas Beniušis
- (Lithuania) **Valdemar Borovskij**
- (Lithuania) **Karolis Chvedukas**
- (Lithuania) Artūras Fomenka
- (Lithuania) Dominykas Galkevičius
- (Lithuania) Darius Gvildys
- (Lithuania) **Algis Jankauskas**
- (Lithuania) **Tadas Kijanskas**
- (Lithuania) **Povilas Lukšys**
- (Lithuania) **Darius Maciulevičius**
- (Lithuania) Tomas Mikuckis
- (Lithuania) **Povilas Leimonas**
- (Lithuania) **Vytautas Andriuškevičius**
- (Lithuania) Ramūnas Radavičius
- (Lithuania) **Tomas Radzinevičius**
- (Lithuania) Nerijus Radžius
- (Lithuania) Tomas Ražanauskas
- (Lithuania) Mantas Samusiovas
- (Lithuania) **Vaidas Slavickas**
- (Lithuania) **Nerijus Valskis**
- (Lithuania) **Ovidijus Verbickas**
- (Lithuania) Irmantas Zelmikas
- (Lithuania) **Karolis Laukžemis**
- (Lithuania) **Paulius Golubickas**
- (Lithuania) **Markas Beneta**

Europe

- (Croatia) Andro Švrljuga
- (Austria) Daniel Offenbacher
- (Latvia) Ivans Lukjanovs
- (Bosnia and Herzegovina) Semir Kerla
- (Belarus) Vital Hayduchyk
- (Serbia) Predrag Pavlović

South America

- (Chile) Gerson Acevedo
- (Brazil) Rafael Gaúcho
- (Brazil) Willer Souza Oliveira

CONCACAF

- (Canada) Tosaint Ricketts
- (Canada) Sandro Grande
- (Curaçao) **Rigino Cicilia**
- (Curaçao) **Jeremy de Nooijer**
- (Trinidad and Tobago) **Radanfah Abu Bakr**

Africa

- (Cape Verde) Sérgio Semedo
- (Gabon) **Henri Junior Ndong**
- (Togo) **Serge Nyuiadzi**
- (Uganda) Eugene Sseppuya

Asia

- (Japan) Keisuke Honda

=== Sūduva B ===
Sūduva B team play in Second league (Southern Zone) since 2016. In 2019 season was in 13th position from 13 teams.

== Technical staff ==
Position	Name
Head coach	(Lithuania) Donatas Vencevičius
Assistant Coach	(Lithuania) Vaidas Slavickas
Assistant Coach	(Lithuania) Marius Buividavicius
Goalkeeping coach	(Lithuania)
Head physio	(Lithuania) Nerijus Stepanauskas
Physio	(Lithuania) Rimantas Česnulis

== Seasons ==
Results of league and cup competitions by season
Season	League										Domestic Cup		Europe		Other		League top goalscorer	
Season	Div	T	Pld	W	D	L	GF	GA	Pts	Pos	Competition	Result	Competition	Result	Competition	Result	Name(s)	Goals
1990	Baltic League	I	32	1	5	26	13	69	7	17th	LFF Cup	R32	—	—	—	—	—	—
1991	LFF Lyga	I	14	0	2	12	5	44	2	15th ↓	LFF Cup	QF	—	—	—	—	—	—
1991–92	I Lyga	II	28	7	6	15	24	45	20	11th	LFF Cup	R32	—	—	—	—	—	—
1992–93	I Lyga	II	24	1	1	24	13	82	3	14th ↓	LFF Cup	R32	—	—	—	—	—	—
1993–94	II Lyga South Zone	III					44	23	26	3rd	—	—	—	—	—	—	—	—
1994–95	III Lyga	III	22	11	6	5	31	24	28	2nd ↑	—	—	—	—	—	—	—	—
1995–96	II Lyga	II	24	9	4	11	35	37	31	8th	LFF Cup	R64	—	—	—	—	—	—
1996–97	II Lyga	II	30	17	4	9	48	32	55	4th	—	—	—	—	—	—	—	—
1997–98	I Lyga	II	26	9	3	14	31	49	30	10th	LFF Cup	R16	—	—	—	—	—	—
1998–99	II Lyga	II	14	7	1	6	23	17	22	11th (Note: Club decided to withdraw from the competitions after half of the season, but they results were left)	LFF Cup	R32	—	—	—	—	—	—
1999	II Lyga South Zone	III	10	8	1	1	39	9	25	2nd	—	—	—	—	—	—	—	—
2000	II Lyga South Zone	III	16+1 (Note: Additional game was played to determine winner of the competition, as Sūduva and Sveikata finished with identical number of victories, draws and defeats. Sūduva won it 3–2.)	14+1	1	1	48+3	8+2	43	1st ↑	—	—	—	—	—	—	—	—
2000	II Lyga South Zone	III	16+1	14+1	1	1	48+3	8+2	43	1st ↑	—	—	—	—	—	—	—	—
2001	I Lyga	II	30	22	1	7	93	42	67	2nd ↑	—	—	—	—	—	—	Tomas Radzinevičius	29
2001	I Lyga	II	30	22	1	7	93	42	67	2nd ↑	LFF Cup	F	—	—	—	—	Tomas Radzinevičius	29
2002	A Lyga	I	32	11	8	13	44	50	41	6th	LFF Cup	F	UEFA Cup	1R	—	—	Tomas Radzinevičius	14
2002	A Lyga	I	32	11	8	13	44	50	41	6th	LFF Cup	R16	UEFA Cup	1R	—	—	Tomas Radzinevičius	14
2003	A Lyga	I	28	8	8	12	39	45	32	6th	LFF Cup	R16	—	—	—	—	Tomas Radzinevičius	11
2003	A Lyga	I	28	8	8	12	39	45	32	6th	LFF Cup	SF	—	—	—	—	Tomas Radzinevičius	11
2004	A Lyga	I	28	5	7	16	31	55	22	7th	LFF Cup	QF	—	—	—	—	Tomas Radzinevičius	8
2005	A Lyga	I	36	16	11	9	67	43	59	3rd	LFF Cup	QF	—	—	—	—	Tomas Radzinevičius	25
2006	A Lyga	I	36	15	8	13	48	44	53	5th	LFF Cup	W	UEFA Cup	2Q	—	—	Darius Maciulevičius	10
2007	A Lyga	I	36	20	8	8	66	34	68	2nd	LFF Cup	QF	UEFA Cup	2Q	LFF Supercup	F	Jose Negreiros	13
2008	A Lyga	I	28	11	6	8	35	25	48	4th	LFF Cup	QF	UEFA Cup	2Q	Baltic League	QF	Povilas Lukšys	11
2008	A Lyga	I	28	11	6	8	35	25	48	4th	LFF Cup	W	UEFA Cup	2Q	Baltic League	QF	Povilas Lukšys	11
2009	A Lyga	I	28	14	11	3	55	22	53	3rd	LFF Cup	W	UEFA Europa League	2Q	LFF Supercup	W	Ričardas Beniušis	11
2009	A Lyga	I	28	14	11	3	55	22	53	3rd	LFF Cup	SF	UEFA Europa League	2Q	Baltic League	F	Ričardas Beniušis	11
2010	A Lyga	I	27	16	8	3	56	16	56	2nd	LFF Cup	SF	UEFA Europa League	2Q	Baltic League	F	Povilas Lukšys	16
2010	A Lyga	I	27	16	8	3	56	16	56	2nd	LFF Cup	QF	UEFA Europa League	2Q	Baltic League	R16	Povilas Lukšys	16
2011	A Lyga	I	33	19	8	6	70	19	65	3rd	LFF Cup	QF	UEFA Europa League	2Q	—	—	Tadas Eliošius	13
2011	A Lyga	I	33	19	8	6	70	19	65	3rd	LFF Cup	SF	UEFA Europa League	2Q	—	—	Tadas Eliošius	13
2012	A Lyga	I	36	21	7	8	77	37	70	3rd	LFF Cup	SF	UEFA Europa League	2Q	—	—	Rafael Ledesma	21
2012	A Lyga	I	36	21	7	8	77	37	70	3rd	LFF Cup	R16	UEFA Europa League	2Q	—	—	Rafael Ledesma	21
2013	A Lyga	I	32	18	8	6	73	33	62	4th	LFF Cup	R16	UEFA Europa League	1Q	—	—	Nerijus Valskis	27
2013	A Lyga	I	32	18	8	6	73	33	62	4th	LFF Cup	R16	UEFA Europa League	1Q	—	—	Nerijus Valskis	27
2014	A Lyga	I	36	17	11	8	70	38	62	5th	LFF Cup	R16	—	—	—	—	Tomas Radzinevičius	13
2014	A Lyga	I	36	17	11	8	70	38	62	5th	LFF Cup	QF	—	—	—	—	Tomas Radzinevičius	13
2015	A Lyga	I	36	21	4	11	76	34	67	4th	LFF Cup	QF	—	—	—	—	Tomas Radzinevičius	28
2015	A Lyga	I	36	21	4	11	76	34	67	4th	LFF Cup	SF	—	—	—	—	Tomas Radzinevičius	28
2016	A Lyga	I	33	17	7	9	55	41	58	3rd	LFF Cup	SF	UEFA Europa League	1Q	—	—	Tomas Radzinevičius	14
2016	A Lyga	I	33	17	7	9	55	41	58	3rd	LFF Cup	F	UEFA Europa League	1Q	—	—	Tomas Radzinevičius	14
2017	A Lyga	I	33	21	8	4	73	31	71	1st	LFF Cup	SF	UEFA Europa League	PO	—	—	Karolis Laukžemis	14
2018	A Lyga	I	33	24	5	4	72	20	77	1st	LFF Cup	QF	UEFA Champions League; UEFA Europa League	2Q; PO	LFF Supercup	W	Gerson Acevedo	10
2019	A Lyga	I	33	29	0	4	95	24	87	1st	LFF Cup	W	UEFA Champions League; UEFA Europa League	1Q; PO	LFF Supercup	W	Mihret Topčagić	20
2020	A Lyga	I	20	13	4	3	32	18	43	2nd	LFF Cup	F	UEFA Champions League; UEFA Europa League	2Q; 3Q	LFF Supercup	F	Josip Tadić	11
2021	A Lyga	I	36	21	7	8	64	33	70	2nd	LFF Cup	QF	UEFA Conference League	2Q	—	—	Serge Nyuiadzi	8
2022	A Lyga	I	36	15	10	11	48	40	55	6th	LFF Cup	QF	UEFA Conference League	2Q	LFF Supercup	W	Kule Mbombo	11
2023	A Lyga	I	36	10	5	21	28	60	35	7th	LFF Cup	QF	—	—	—	—	Aivars Emsis	5
2024	A Lyga	I	36	9	12	15	33	38	39	9th	LFF Cup	R16	—	—	—	—	Steve Lawson	5
2025	A Lyga	I	36	15	14	7	48	36	59	4th	LFF Cup	SF	—	—	—	—	Nauris Petkevičius	8

== European record ==
Accurate as of 26 August 2020

Competition	Played	Won	Drew	Lost	GF	GA	GD	Win%
UEFA Champions League	8	1	2	5	5	13	−8	12.50
UEFA Cup / UEFA Europa League	46	15	12	19	59	70	−11	32.61
Total	54	16	14	24	64	83	−19	29.63

Source: UEFA.com
Pld = Matches played; W = Matches won; D = Matches drawn; L = Matches lost; GF = Goals for; GA = Goals against; GD = Goal Difference. Defunct competitions indicated in italics.

Season	Cup	Round	Club	Home	Away	Aggregate
2002–03	UEFA Cup	QR	(Norway) Brann	3–2	3–2	6–4
2002–03	UEFA Cup	1R	(Scotland) Celtic	0–2	1–8	1–10
2006–07	UEFA Cup	1Q	(Wales) Rhyl	2–1	0–0	2–1
2006–07	UEFA Cup	2Q	(Belgium) Club Brugge	0–2	2–5	2–7
2007–08	UEFA Cup	1Q	(Northern Ireland) Dungannon Swifts	4–0	0–1	4–1
2007–08	UEFA Cup	2Q	(Norway) Brann	3–4	1–2	4–6
2008–09	UEFA Cup	1Q	(Wales) TNS	1–0	1–0	2–0
2008–09	UEFA Cup	2Q	(Austria) Red Bull Salzburg	1–4	1–0	2–4
2009–10	UEFA Europa League	2Q	(Denmark) Randers	0–1	1–1	1–2
2010–11	UEFA Europa League	2Q	(Austria) Rapid Wien	0–2	2–4	2–6
2011–12	UEFA Europa League	2Q	(Sweden) Elfsborg	1–1	0–3	1–4
2012–13	UEFA Europa League	1Q	(Latvia) Daugava	0–1	3–2	3–3 (a)
2012–13	UEFA Europa League	2Q	(Serbia) Vojvodina	0–4	1–1	1–5
2013–14	UEFA Europa League	1Q	(North Macedonia) Horizont Turnovo	2–2	2–2 (a.e.t.)	4–4 (4–5 p)
2016–17	UEFA Europa League	1Q	(Denmark) Midtjylland	0–1	0–1	0–2
2017–18	UEFA Europa League	1Q	(Belarus) Shakhtyor Soligorsk	2–1	0–0	2–1
2017–18	UEFA Europa League	2Q	(Latvia) Liepāja	0–1	2–0	2–1
2017–18	UEFA Europa League	3Q	(Switzerland) Sion	3–0	1–1	4–1
2017–18	UEFA Europa League	PO	(Bulgaria) Ludogorets Razgrad	0–0	0–2	0–2
2018–19	UEFA Champions League	1Q	(Cyprus) APOEL	3–1	0–1	3–2
2018–19	UEFA Champions League	2Q	(Serbia) Red Star Belgrade	0–2	0–3	0–5
2018–19	UEFA Europa League	3Q	(Latvia) FK Spartaks Jūrmala	0–0	1–0	1–0
2018–19	UEFA Europa League	PO	(Scotland) Celtic	1–1	0–3	1–4
2019–20	UEFA Champions League	1Q	(Serbia) Red Star Belgrade	0–0	1–2	1–2
2019–20	UEFA Europa League	2Q	(San Marino) Tre Penne	5–0	5–0	10–0
2019–20	UEFA Europa League	3Q	(Israel) Maccabi Tel Aviv	2–1	2–1	4–2
2019–20	UEFA Europa League	PO	(Hungary) Ferencváros	0–0	2–4	2–4
2020–21	UEFA Champions League	1Q	(Estonia) Flora	—N/a	1–1 (4–2 p)	—N/a
2020–21	UEFA Champions League	2Q	(Israel) Maccabi Tel Aviv	0–3	—N/a	—N/a
2020–21	UEFA Europa League	3Q	(Finland) KuPS	—N/a	0–2	—N/a
2021–22	UEFA Europa Conference League	1Q	(Latvia) Valmiera	2–1	0–0	2–1
2021–22	UEFA Europa Conference League	2Q	(Poland) Raków Częstochowa	0–0	0–0 (a.e.t.)	0–0 (3–4 p)
2022–23	UEFA Europa Conference League	2Q	(Denmark) Viborg	0–1	0–1	0–2
2027–28	UEFA Conference League	1Q				

== Individual awards ==
=== Domestic ===
A Lyga top scorers

Season	Name	Goals
2010	(Lithuania) Povilas Lukšys	16
2013	(Lithuania) Nerijus Valskis	27
2015	(Lithuania) Tomas Radzinevičius	28

A Lyga Player of the Year

Year	Name
2002	(Lithuania) Tomas Radzinevičius
2013	(Lithuania) Nerijus Valskis
2015	(Lithuania) Tomas Radzinevičius
2017	(Lithuania) Karolis Laukžemis
2018	(Lithuania) Ovidijus Verbickas
2019	(Bosnia and Herzegovina) Semir Kerla

Lithuanian SSR Championship top scorers

Season	Name	Goals
1975	(Lithuanian Soviet Socialist Republic) Eugenijus Kurguznikovas	17

Fk Suduva "Player of the Year" Lists of the winners of Sūduva Marijampolė Player of the Year Award instituted from 2008 as voted by fans:

- 2008: (Lithuania) Darius Maciulevičius
- 2009: (Lithuania) Ramūnas Radavičius
- 2010: (Lithuania) Vaidas Slavickas
- 2011: (Lithuania) Vaidas Slavickas
- 2012: (Brazil) Rafael Ledesma
- 2013: (Lithuania) Nerijus Valskis
- 2014: (Lithuania) Džiugas Bartkus
- 2015: (Lithuania) Tomas Radzinevičius

== Managers ==
- (Lithuanian Soviet Socialist Republic) Jonas Kaupaitis (1968–73)
- (Lithuania) Mantas Valukonis (1991)
- (Lithuania) Saulius Stankūnas (1991–03)
- (Lithuania) Algimantas Gabrys (2003 – 31 December 2003)
- (Lithuania) Valdemaras Žilinskas (2004)
- (Italy) Rino Lavezzini (2004 – 2 May 2005)
- (Lithuania) Algimantas Gabrys (10 May 2005 – 20 April 2008)
- (Lithuania) Igoris Pankratjevas (2008)
- (Lithuania) Gediminas Jarmalavičius (2008–09)
- (Lithuania) Donatas Vencevičius (29 January 2010 – 19 November 2010)
- (Lithuania) Virginijus Liubšys (17 April 2010 – 6 July 2012)
- (Lithuania) Darius Gvildys (9 July 2012 – Sept 2014)
- (Serbia) Aleksandar Veselinović (21 December 2014 – 31 August 2016)
- (Kazakhstan) Vladimir Cheburin (8 September 2016 – 22 December 2019)
- (Austria) Heimo Pfeifenberger (8 January 2020 - 14 April 2020)
- (Lithuania) Saulius Širmelis (23 May 2020 - end of the season)
- (Spain) Víctor Basadre (January 2021 – 4 April 2022)
- (Lithuania) Eivinas Černiauskas (4 April 2022 - 11 April 2022)
- (Portugal) Miguel Moreira (11 April 2022 – 20 October 2022)
- (Portugal) Matthew Silva (temporary) October, november 2022
- (Lithuania) Dovydas Lastauskas (March 2023 – December 2024)
- (Lithuania) Donatas Vencevičius (21 December 2024)
