= Ivan Kardum =

Croatian football goalkeeper (born 1987)

Personal information
- Date of birth: 18 July 1987 (age 39)
- Place of birth: Osijek, Croatia
- Height: 1.87 m (6 ft 1 1/2 in)
- Position: Goalkeeper

Team information
- Current team: Ritzing

Youth career
- 1996–2003: BSK Termia Bizovac
- 2003–2007: Osijek

Senior career*
Years	Team	Apps	(Gls)
2007–2012	Osijek	77	(0)
2007–2008	→ Vukovar '91 (loan)	26	(0)
2008–2009	→ Grafičar Vodovod (loan)		
2012–2014	Austria Wien	0	(0)
2014–2015	Slaven Belupo	24	(0)
2016–2021	Sūduva	159	(0)
2022	Traiskirchen	10	(0)
2022-	Ritzing	9	(0)

International career^{‡}
2004	Croatia U18	1	(0)
2005–2006	Croatia U19	10	(0)
- * Club domestic league appearances and goals as of 12 August 2021 ‡ National team caps and goals as of 2006

Ivan Kardum (born 18 July 1987) is a Croatian football goalkeeper, who plays for Austrian fourth tier-side SC Ritzing.

== Honours ==
Individual

- A Lyga Team of the Year: 2018
