= 2003 Turkmenistan President's Cup =

IX Turkmenistan President Cup (2003)

== Group A ==
Team	Pld	W	D	L	GF	GA	GD	Pts
(Turkmenistan) Nisa Aşgabat	3	3	0	0	7	0	+7	9
(Belarus) Neman Grodno	3	2	0	1	3	2	+1	6
(Armenia) FC Banants	3	1	0	2	1	2	-1	3
(Kazakhstan) FC Shakhter Karagandy	3	0	0	3	1	8	-7	0

12 February 2003
Nisa Aşgabat	1–0	Neman Grodno
FC Shakhter Karagandy	0–1	FC Banants
14 February 2003
Neman Grodno	1–0	FC Banants
Nisa Aşgabat	5–0	FC Shakhter Karagandy
16 February 2003
FC Shakhter Karagandy	1–2	Neman Grodno
FC Banants	0–1	Nisa Aşgabat

== Group B ==
Team	Pld	W	D	L	GF	GA	GD	Pts
Turkmenistan U23	3	1	1	1	2	1	+1	4
(Lithuania) Atlantas Klaipeda	3	1	1	1	2	1	+1	4
(Russia) Lokomotiv Moskva	3	1	1	1	1	2	-1	4
(Estonia) FC Valga	3	1	1	1	1	2	-1	4

11 February 2003
Turkmenistan	0–0	Atlantas
Valga	0–0	Lokomotiv
13 February 2003
Atlantas	0–1	Lokomotiv
Turkmenistan	0–1	Valga
15 February 2003
Valga	0–2	Atlantas
Lokomotiv	0–2	Turkmenistan

Third Place

2003-02-18

Neman Grodno (Belarus)	0 - 1	(Lithuania) Atlantas Klaipeda
		Dainius Zernys pen' (71)

== Final ==
2003-02-19

Nisa Aşgabat (Turkmenistan)	1 - 0	Turkmenistan U23
Nazar Baýramow 48'

Attendance: 17.000
