= Ovidijus Verbickas =

Lithuanian footballer (born 1993)

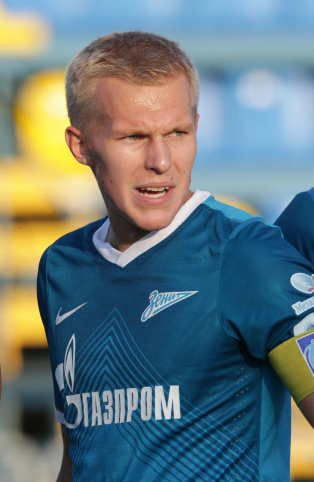

Personal information
- Date of birth: 4 July 1993 (age 33)
- Place of birth: Ukmergė, Lithuania
- Height: 1.85 m (6 ft 1 in)
- Position: Midfielder

Team information
- Current team: Žalgiris
- Number: 22

Youth career
- FK Rotalis

Senior career*
Years	Team	Apps	(Gls)
2012–2014	Zenit St.Petersburg II	53	(0)
2014	→ Atlantas (loan)	31	(6)
2014–2015	Marbella	4	(0)
2015–2017	Atlantas	47	(12)
2017–2019	Sūduva Marijampolė	71	(13)
2020	Taraz	14	(0)
2021–	Žalgiris	180	(13)

International career^{‡}
2011–2012	Lithuania U-19	7	(2)
2013–2014	Lithuania U-21	8	(1)
2016–	Lithuania	36	(1)
- * Club domestic league appearances and goals as of 24 August 2026 ‡ National team caps and goals as of 10 September 2024

Ovidijus Verbickas (born 4 July 1993) is a Lithuanian professional footballer who plays as a midfielder for A Lyga club Žalgiris and Lithuania national team.

== History ==
Since the summer of 2011, Verbickas played for the youth squad of Zenit, the first match for him was played in August 2011, coming on as a substitute in the game against FC Krasnodar. In total, Ovidijus played 58 matches for the Zenit youth team and scored 6 goals. In September 2012, he was included in to "Zenit" team at the 2012–13 UEFA Champions League.

On 6 March 2014, he was loaned out to Lithuanian A Lyga vice-champions Atlantas.

On 21 January 2020, he signed with Kazakhstan Premier League club FC Taraz.

In January 2021, he joined Lithuanian club FK Žalgiris.

=== International goals ===
Scores and results list Armenia's goal tally first.

No	Date	Venue	Opponent	Score	Result	Competition
1.	27 March 2018	Vazgen Sargsyan Republican Stadium, Yerevan, Armenia	Armenia	1–0	1–0	Friendly

== Honours ==
Individual

- A Lyga Player of the Year: 2018
- A Lyga Player of the Month: April 2018
