= Algis Jankauskas =

Lithuanian footballer (born 1982)

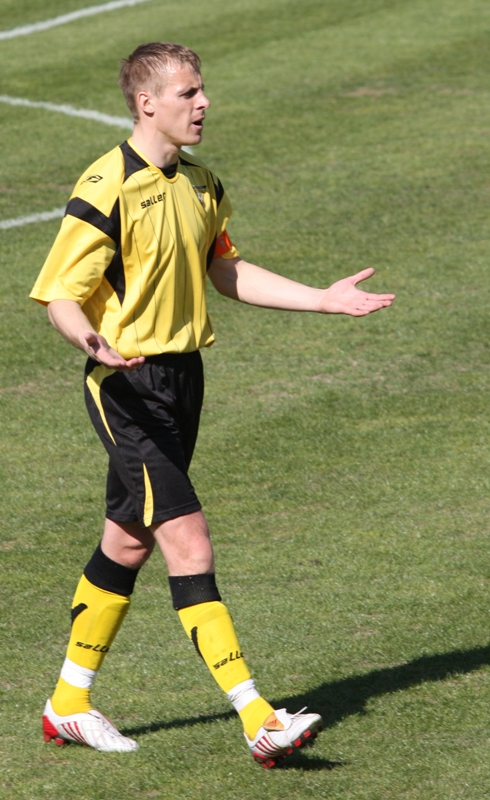

Personal information
- Date of birth: 27 September 1982 (age 44)
- Place of birth: Vilnius, Lithuania
- Height: 1.85 m (6 ft 1 in)
- Position: Defender

Senior career*
Years	Team	Apps	(Gls)
2000	Polonija Vilnius	3	(0)
2003–2004	FK Žalgiris Vilnius	20	(1)
2004–2005	FC Amkar Perm	7	(0)
2006–2010	FK Vėtra	97	(5)
2010–2015	Žalgiris Vilnius	138	(12)
2016–2020	FK Sūduva	124	(2)
2021–2022	Šiauliai	35	(8)

International career
2008–2012	Lithuania	4	(0)
- * Club domestic league appearances and goals

Algis Jankauskas (born 27 September 1982) is a Lithuanian former professional football player.

== Honours ==
Individual

- A Lyga Team of the Year: 2018
