= Rolandas Baravykas =

Lithuanian footballer (born 1995)

Personal information
- Date of birth: 23 August 1995 (age 31)
- Place of birth: Šiauliai, Lithuania
- Height: 1.85 m (6 ft 1 in)
- Position: Defender

Team information
- Current team: FK Grobiņa
- Number: 27

Youth career
- –2012: Šiauliai

Senior career*
Years	Team	Apps	(Gls)
2013–2016	Atlantas	85	(0)
2017–2019	Žalgiris	74	(4)
2020	Nea Salamina	8	(0)
2021	Kukësi	17	(0)
2021–2022	UTA Arad	21	(0)
2022	Universitatea Cluj	4	(0)
2023	Farul Constanța	3	(0)
2023–2024	Šiauliai	44	(2)
2025–	FK Grobiņa	48	(4)

International career^{‡}
2012	Lithuania U17	2	(0)
2013	Lithuania U18	1	(0)
2013–2014	Lithuania U19	8	(0)
2013–2016	Lithuania U21	18	(1)
2015–	Lithuania	35	(2)
- * Club domestic league appearances and goals as of 12 November 2026 ‡ National team caps and goals as of 27 March 2023

Rolandas Baravykas (born 23 August 1995) is a Lithuanian professional footballer who plays as a defender for FK Grobiņa and the Lithuania national team.

== Club career ==
In 2013 Baravykas moved to FK Atlantas and signed 4 years deal. In this period, Rolandas managed to establish himself as a starting 11 player and appeared more than 100 times for his club. He also was invited into Lithuania national team and made his debut in a friendly match against Malta. He also played in various youth teams. After 2016 season he joined FK Žalgiris. After 2019 season he left Žalgiris.

On 12 July 2023, Baravykas returned to Lithuania to play for Šiauliai.

== Style of play ==
Baravykas is an all-round full-back. His primary position is on the right side, but he also can play on the left.

== International career ==
In May 2015, Baravykas received his first call-up to the senior Lithuania squad for two matches against Hungary and Malta.

=== International stats ===
Lithuania national team
Year	Apps	Goals
2015	1	0
2016	2	0
2017	1	0
2018	10	1
2019	5	0
2020	1	0
2021	4	1
2022	9	0
2023	2	0
Total	35	2

=== International goals ===
Scores and results list Lithuania's goal tally first.

No.	Date	Venue	Opponent	Score	Result	Competition
1.	14 October 2018	LFF Stadium, Vilnius, Lithuania	Montenegro	1–4	1–4	2018-19 UEFA Nations League C
2.	2 September 2021	LFF Stadium, Vilnius, Lithuania	Northern Ireland	1–2	1–4	2022 FIFA World Cup qualification

== Honours ==
=== Club ===
Atlantas

- A Lyga runner-up: 2013
- Lithuanian Cup runner-up: 2014–15

Žalgiris

- A Lyga runner-up: 2017, 2018, 2019
- Lithuanian Cup: 2018
- Lithuanian Supercup: 2017

Farul Constanța

- Liga I: 2022–23

=== International ===
Lithuania

- Baltic Cup: runner-up 2016
