= 2011–12 Lithuanian Football Cup =

Tournament details
- Country: Lithuania

Final positions
- Champions: Žalgiris (6th title)
- Runners-up: Ekranas

The 2011–12 Lithuanian Football Cup was the 23rd season of the Lithuanian annual football knock-out tournament. The competition started on 5 June 2011 with the matches of the first round and ended on 20 May 2012. Ekranas were the defending champions.

The winners will qualify for the second qualifying round of the 2012–13 UEFA Europa League.

== First round ==
The matches were played around 5 June 2011.

Team 1	Score	Team 2
Jambo Klaipėda	9–0	Oniksas Kaunas
FK Prelegentai Vilnius	6–3	FK Troja Vilnius
Legionas Lavoriškės	0–3 w/o	Bekentas Vilnius
FK Pagegiai	3–0 w/o	Euforija Vilnius
FK Fanai Šiauliai	0–0 a.e.t. 4–2 pen	Sarema Klaipeda
FM Granitas Vilnius	12–0	Vulkanas Jurbarkas
Visas Labas Kaunas	4–0	Dainava Veisiejai
GB United Vilnius	1–0	Grifas Šiauliai
FK Sakuona-Klarksonas Plikiai	6–1	Trivartis Joniškis
Pietu IV Vilnius	3–2 a.e.t.	FK Rezervai Vilnius
Polonija	3–1	FK TEC Vilnius
91 United Kaunas	3–2	FK Kiemas Vilnius
Centras Alytus	2–1	FK Viltis Vilnius
Peruno Vilnius	1–0	Adiada Šiauliai
Fortas Kaunas	3–1	Saulininkas Šiauliai
FK Rytas Vilnius	1–2	FK Pipirini Rokiškis
FK Narjanta Kupiskis	0–3	FK Baltai Kaišiadorys
Fakyrai Vilnius	1–1 a.e.t. 4–2 pen	FC KUPSC Šiauliai
FK Olimpija Vilnius	0–2	Lokomotyvas Radviliskis
Ozas	3–1	FK Gariūnai Vilnius
Aktas Vilnius	7–1	LiCS Vilnius
FK Ozo tapyrai Vilnius	2–0	Sesupe Cyckai

== Second round ==
The matches were played around 3 July 2011.

Team 1	Score	Team 2
Polonija	5–4	Pietu IV Vilnius
FK Baltai Kaišiadorys	1–0 a.e.t.	FK Ozo tapyrai Vilnius
FK Prelegentai Vilnius	2–2 a.e.t. 4–5 pen	91 United Kaunas
Fortas Kaunas	3–2	Lokomotyvas Radviliskis
Ozas	2–3	Jambo Klaipėda
FM Granitas Vilnius	4–1	Centras Alytus
Fakyrai Vilnius	1–2	Visas Labas Kaunas
Aktas Vilnius	1–0 a.e.t.	FK Fanai Šiauliai
FK Pipirini Rokiškis	5–0	Peruno Vilnius
Bekentas Vilnius	1–0	GB United Vilnius
FK Sakuona-Klarksonas Plikiai	3–0	FK Pagegiai

== Third round ==
The matches were played between 23 August and 9 September 2011.

Team 1	Score	Team 2
Venta Kuršėnai	5–2	FK Sakuona-Klarksonas Plikiai
FM Granitas Vilnius	2–1	91 United Kaunas
Bekentas Vilnius	3–0	Visas Labas Kaunas
FK Reo LT Vilnius	3–0 w/o	FK Baltai Kaišiadorys
FK Pipirini Rokiškis	1–3 a.e.t.	Šilutė
Jambo Klaipėda	0–0 a.e.t. 3–2 pen	Aktas Vilnius
Minija Kretinga	1–4	FK Trakai
Fortas Kaunas	1–2	Polonija

== Fourth round ==
These matches were played on 27 and 28 September 2011.

Team 1	Score	Team 2
Jambo Klaipėda	2–1	Atletas Kaunas
FK Lifosa Kedainiai	7–2	Venta Kuršėnai
Kaunas	3–0	FM Granitas Vilnius
FK Trakai	1–4	Atlantas
Mažeikiai	3–1 a.e.t.	Dainava
Lietava	0–1	FK Reo LT Vilnius
Šilutė	0–1	Nevėžis
Bekentas Vilnius	0–2	Polonija

== Fifth round ==
These matches took place on 18 and 19 October 2011.

Team 1	Score	Team 2
FK Lifosa Kedainiai	5–1	Glestum Klaipėda
Kaunas	5–0	Jambo Klaipėda
Banga	9–1	Polonija
Kruoja	1–1 a.e.t. 5–4 pen	Mažeikiai
Tauras	1–2	FK Reo LT Vilnius
Sūduva	9–0	Atlantas
Ekranas	2–0	Nevėžis
Šiauliai	0–1	Žalgiris

== Quarterfinals ==
These matches took place on 2 November 2011.

Team 1	Score	Team 2
Kruoja	1–2 a.e.t.	Ekranas
FK Lifosa Kedainiai	1–7	FK Reo LT Vilnius
Kaunas	0–3	Sūduva
Žalgiris	0–0 a.e.t. 5–4 pen	Banga

== Semifinals ==
The 4 winners from the previous round entered this stage of the competition. Unlike the previous rounds of the competition, this was played over two legs. The first legs were played on 11 April 2012 and the second legs were played on 25 April 2012.

Team 1	Agg.	Team 2	1st leg	2nd leg
FK Reo LT Vilnius	0–4	Ekranas	0–2	0–2
Žalgiris	2–2	Sūduva	1–0	1–2

== Final ==
20 May 2012

Žalgiris	0–0 (a.e.t.)	Ekranas
	Report (in Lithuanian)
Penalties
Komolov (penalty scored); Skerla (penalty scored); Grgurović (penalty missed); Kuklys (penalty scored)	3–1	(penalty missed) Radavičius; (penalty missed) Kučys; (penalty scored) Kavaliauskas; (penalty missed) Urdinov

ARVI Arena, Marijampolė
Attendance: 3,000
Referee: Gediminas Mažeika
