= Mariano Barreto =

Portuguese football manager

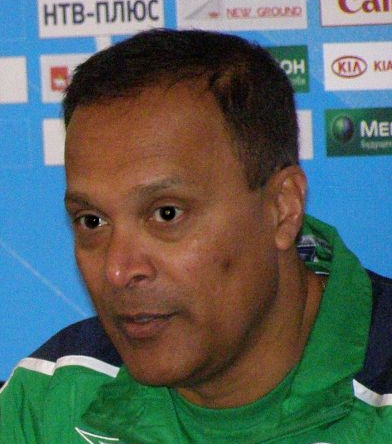
- Barreto in 2009

Personal information
- Date of birth: 18 January 1957 (age 69)
- Place of birth: Ribandar, Goa, Portuguese India

Managerial career
- Years: Team
- 2003–2004: Ghana
- 2004–2005: Marítimo
- 2005: Al-Nassr FC
- 2005–2006: Dynamo Moscow (assistant)
- 2006–2007: Naval 1º de Maio
- 2007–2008: AEL Limassol
- 2009: Kuban Krasnodar (assistant)
- 2009–2011: Recreativo do Libolo
- 2011–2013: Al-Qadisiyah
- 2014–2015: Ethiopia
- 2016–2018: Stumbras
- 2021: Asante Kotoko
- 2022: Burgan SC
- 2024: Belenenses

Mariano Barreto (born 18 January 1957) is a Portuguese football manager.

== Coaching career ==
In January 2009, he became an assistant coach in the Russian Premier League with FC Kuban Krasnodar. Barreto was officially registered as head coach of Kuban because Sergei Ovchinnikov, who really managed the team, did not own a UEFA Pro Licence.

In April 2014, Barreto was selected to take over the head coach of Ethiopia. He agreed to leave the position on 18 April 2015.

From 2016 manager in FC Stumbras. In 2017 won Lithuanian Football Cup.

== Honours ==
FC Stumbras

- Lithuanian Football Cup: 2017

Individual

- A Lyga Coach of the Month: June & July 2018
