= Justinas Marazas =

Lithuanian footballer

Personal information
- Full name: Justinas Marazas
- Date of birth: 23 February 2000 (age 26)
- Place of birth: Vievis, Lithuania
- Height: 1.77 m (5 ft 10 in)
- Position: Right midfielder

Senior career*
Years	Team	Apps	(Gls)
2015–2016	FM Ateitis	17	(5)
2016–2022	Riteriai	73	(9)
2019	→ Wisła Płock (loan)	6	(0)

International career
2017–2018	Lithuania U19	13	(2)
2018–2021	Lithuania U21	5	(1)
2019	Lithuania	2	(0)
- * Club domestic league appearances and goals as of 15 June 2022

Justinas Marazas (born 23 February 2000) is a Lithuanian retired footballer who played as a right midfielder.

== Career ==
Marazas made his A Lyga debut in 2017 for Riteriai.

In the first half of 2019, he was loaned to Polish Ekstraklasa club Wisla Plock.

In the summer of 2019, he rejoined Riteriai. However, Marazas departed the club in 2022, following a prolonged period where he spent his time in rehabilitation addressing injuries.

== Career in national team ==
Marazas made his international debut for Lithuania on 22 March 2019, coming on as a substitute for Saulius Mikoliūnas in the 76th minute of the UEFA Euro 2020 qualifying match against Luxembourg, which finished as a 1–2 away loss.

== Career statistics ==
=== International ===
As of 5 August 2019

Lithuania
Year	Apps	Goals
2019	2	0
Total	2	0

== Honours ==
Individual

- A Lyga Young Player of the Year: 2018
- A Lyga Young Player of the Month: April 2018
