= Evaldas Razulis =

Lithuanian footballer

Personal information
- Full name: Evaldas Razulis
- Date of birth: 3 April 1986 (age 40)
- Place of birth: Mažeikiai, Lithuanian SSR
- Height: 1.90 m (6 ft 3 in)
- Position: Forward

Youth career
- Nafta Mažeikiai

Senior career*
Years	Team	Apps	(Gls)
2003–2007	Krylya Sovetov Samara	0	(0)
2008	Vėtra	7	(1)
2009	Šilutė	12	(8)
2009–2010	FBK Kaunas	18	(24)
2010	→ Partizan Minsk (loan)	9	(0)
2011	Heart of Midlothian	0	(0)
2011	→ FBK Kaunas (loan)	15	(11)
2012–2014	Atlantas	74	(38)
2015	Górnik Łęczna	7	(0)
2016	Atlantas	6	(1)
2017	Jelgava	14	(2)
2019–2020	Atmosfera	31	(3)

International career
	Lithuania U17	5	(2)
	Lithuania U19	5	(1)
	Lithuania U21	3	(0)
2013	Lithuania	6	(1)

Managerial career
- 2022: Atmosfera
- 2023–: Atmosfera (youth)
- * Club domestic league appearances and goals

Evaldas Razulis (born 3 April 1986) is a Lithuanian football manager and former player who played as a forward.

== Club career ==
Born in Mažeikiai, Lithuania, Razulis started his career with FK Nafta in the Lithuanian second division. In 2003, at the age of 16, he moved to Russia to sign for Krylya Sovetov Samara. He spent five years playing for the club's reserve team, and failed to make a single first team appearance. He returned to his home country in 2008 and joined FK Vetra.

On 2 February 2011, Razulis signed for Hearts, originally on loan until the end of the season.

On 22 July 2011 he returned to Kaunas on loan.

On 31 January 2012, Razulis made his loan move to Kaunas permanent for his second spell at the club.

On 9 December 2016 he signed a contract with Latvian vice-champions Jelgava.

=== International goals ===
Scores and results list Lithuania's goal tally first.

#	Date	Venue	Opponent	Score	Result	Competition
1.	26 March 2013	Qemal Stafa Stadium, Tirana	Albania	1–4	1–4	Friendly
