= Marius Činikas =

Lithuanian footballer

Personal information
- Date of birth: 17 May 1986 (age 40)
- Place of birth: Kėdainiai, Lithuanian SSR
- Height: 1.78 m (5 ft 10 in)
- Position: Right-back

Youth career
- 1999–2004: Nevėžis Kėdainiai

Senior career*
Years	Team	Apps	(Gls)
2004–2006	Nevėžis Kėdainiai	68	(13)
2007–2010	FBK Kaunas	53	(8)
2009–2010	→ Hearts (loan)	2	(0)
2010	→ Partizan Minsk (loan)	26	(1)
2011	Liepājas Metalurgs	30	(1)
2012	Minsk	10	(0)
2013	Sillamäe Kalev	35	(1)
2014	Sūduva Marijampolė	30	(0)
2015	Sillamäe Kalev	28	(0)
2016–2017	Sūduva Marijampolė	38	(2)
2018	Jonava	18	(0)
2018	Sūduva Marijampolė	7	(0)
2019	Atlantas	27	(0)
2020	Jonava	4	(1)

International career
- Lithuania U19
2008	Lithuania U21		
- * Club domestic league appearances and goals as of 20:35, 1 November 2022 (UTC)

Marius Činikas (born 17 May 1986) is a Lithuanian futsal player and former footballer.

== Career ==
Činikas had a trial spell with Hearts in February 2009, but he failed to win a contract. He rejoined Hearts for their preseason tour to Germany, but he returned to play for Kaunas in their Europa League qualifiers against FK Sevojno. On 28 August 2009, however, it was announced that he had joined Hearts. Činikas made his debut appearance for Hearts in a 1–1 draw in an Edinburgh derby played on 3 January 2010. He was deployed as a right back. On 1 February 2010, Hearts confirmed he would be returning to FBK Kaunas. In April 2010 he joined FC Partizan Minsk. In March 2011 he signed a contract with FK Liepājas Metalurgs in Latvia.

== International career ==
He was a regular for the Lithuanian U21 side.
