= Vadimas Petrenko =

Lithuanian footballer (born 1974)

Personal information
- Date of birth: 26 March 1974 (age 52)
- Place of birth: Klaipėda, Lithuanian SSR, USSR
- Height: 1.81 m (5 ft 11 1/2 in)
- Position: Central midfielder

Senior career*
Years	Team	Apps	(Gls)
1993	FK Panerys Vilnius	8	(0)
1993–1994	Aras Klaipėda	30	(7)
1995	FK Atlantas	27	(3)
1996–1997	FK Atletas	48	(7)
1998	FK Atlantas	2	(0)
1998–1999	FBK Kaunas	36	(6)
2000	Lokomotiv Nizhny Novgorod	9	(0)
2000–2002	FBK Kaunas	51	(6)
2002–2003	Sigma Olomouc	10	(0)
2003–2004	FBK Kaunas	40	(1)
2005	FK Žalgiris	7	(0)
2005	FBK Kaunas	11	(0)
2006	FK Šilutė	13	(1)
2006–2007	Liepājas Metalurgs	11	(0)
2008	FBK Kaunas	?	(?)
2008	→ FC Levadia (loan)	9	(0)

International career
1998–2003	Lithuania	7	(0)
- * Club domestic league appearances and goals

Vadimas Petrenko (born 26 March 1974) is a Lithuanian former professional footballer. He played the position of midfielder and is a former member of the Lithuania national football team.
