= 2008–09 Lithuanian Football Cup =

2008-09 Lithuanian Football Cup
Tournament details
- Country: Lithuania

The Lithuanian Football Cup 2008–09 was the 20th season of the Lithuanian annual football tournament. The competition started on May 7, 2008, with the First Round games and ended on May 16, 2009, with the Final. The defending champions were Kaunas.

== First round ==
In this round entered 38 teams from Lithuanian third, fourth and fifth division. The games were played on May 7 – 11, 2008.

Team 1	Score	Team 2
Lifosa Kėdainiai	3–4	Mažoji Statyba Vilnius
TEC Vilnius	0–1	LiCS Vilnius
Sakuona Plikiai	w/o	Reaktorius Vilnius^{1}
Kairiai-Knituva	0–6	REO LT Vilnius
Rezervai Vilnius	2–5	Snoras Vilnius
Advoco Vilnius	1–7	Fazė Vilnius
Gariūnai Vilnius	3–2 (aet)	Fortūna Vilnius
Jambo Klaipėda	w/o	Dynamo Vilnius^{1}
Troja Vilnius	1–3	KUPSC Šiauliai
Baltai Kaišiadorys	1–2	Kėdainių SM
Minija Kretinga	2–3 (aet)	Venta Kuršėnai
Evikonas Visaginas	w/o	Vova Vilnius^{1}
Ozas Vilnius	1–1 (aet, p. 3–5)	Švyturys Marijampolė
Prelegentai Vilnius	8–0	Saulininkas Šiauliai
Trivartis Vilnius	0–6	Vidzgiris Alytus
Narjanta Kupiškis	7–1	Futera Klaipėda
Spartakas Ukmergė	0–1	Kiemas Vilnius
LDK United	2–3 (aet)	Troleibusas Vilnius
Centras-Auskas Alytus	w/o	Viltis Vilnius^{1}

^{1}Teams did not arrive to the pitch.

== Second round ==
This round featured 19 winners from the previous round and 5 teams from the Lithuanian second division (LFF I lyga). The matches were played on June 1 – 6, 2008.

Team 1	Score	Team 2
Vidzgiris Alytus	5–0	Troleibusas Vilnius
KUPSC Šiauliai	1–6	Centras-Auskas Alytus
Glestum Klaipėda	3–0	Švyturys Marijampolė
Mažoji Statyba Vilnius	2–1	Narjanta Kupiškis
Sakuona Plikiai	0–1	Evikonas Visaginas
Gariūnai Vilnius	1–2	LiCS Vilnius
Venta Kuršėnai	4–0	Kauno Jėgeriai
Snoras Vilnius	4–0	Kėdainių SM
Jambo Klaipėda	4–3	Fazė Vilnius
Prelegentai Vilnius	1–4 (aet)	Tauras Tauragė
Kiemas Vilnius	1–3	Anykščiai
Utenis Utena	2–1	REO LT Vilnius

== Third round ==
In this round entered winners from the previous round as well as 4 other LFF I lyga teams. The games were played on July 2 – 9, 2008.

Team 1	Score	Team 2
Tauras Tauragė	5–1	Snoras Vilnius
Anykščiai	0–4	Evikonas Visaginas
Lietava Jonava	3–1	Glestum Klaipėda
Centras-Auskas Alytus	3–0	Utenis Utena
Jambo Klaipėda	1–4	LiCS Vilnius
Mažoji Statyba Vilnius	0–8	Venta Kuršėnai
LKKA ir Teledema Kaunas	3–2	Vidzgiris Alytus
Kruoja Pakruojis	0–2	Banga Gargždai

== Fourth round ==
In this round entered winners from the previous round together with 2 remaining LFF I lyga teams and 6 lowest-placed 2007 LFF Lyga teams. 2 out of 6 2007 LFF Lyga were relegated to the Lithuanian second division while the rest remained in A lyga. The games were played on August 20 – 27, 2008.

Team 1	Score	Team 2
LiCS Vilnius	0–0 (aet, p. 7–6)	Centras-Auskas Alytus
Lietava Jonava	3–1	Rodiklis Kaunas
Banga Gargždai	5–0	Evikonas Visaginas
Nevėžis	3–4	Tauras Tauragė
Venta Kuršėnai	1–3	Atlantas
LKKA ir Teledema Kaunas	1–4	Vėtra
Alytis Alytus	0–1	Šilutė
Šiauliai	0–0 (aet, p. 4–2)	FC Vilnius

== Fifth round ==
This round featured winners from the previous round. The games were played on September 12 – 17, 2008.

Team 1	Score	Team 2
Atlantas	1–0	LiCS Vilnius
Šilutė	5–1	Lietava Jonava
Banga Gargždai	1–2	Šiauliai
Tauras Tauragė	1–0	Vėtra

== Quarterfinals ==
In this round entered winners from the previous round and teams placed first to fourth in 2007 LFF Lyga. The games were played on October 1, 2008.

Team 1	Score	Team 2
Tauras Tauragė	2–0	Ekranas
Sūduva	7–2	Šiauliai
Žalgiris	2–2 (aet, p. 0–3)	Šilutė
Kaunas	3–0	Atlantas

== Semi-finals ==
The first legs were played on April 8, 2009. The second legs were played on April 22, 2009.

Team 1	Agg.	Team 2	1st leg	2nd leg
Kaunas	1–3	Tauras Tauragė	1–1	0–2
Sūduva	6–0	Šilutė	1–0	5–0

== Final ==
Tauras Tauragė played in the final for the first time in 20 years. Sūduva won the match to clinch the cup for the first time since 2006. By doing so, the club also qualified for the following season's UEFA Europa League.

16 May 2009
15:00 EEST

Tauras Tauragė	0–1	Sūduva
	Report (in Lithuanian)	Radavičius 62'

S. Darius and S. Girėnas Stadium, Kaunas
Attendance: 3,000
Referee: Gediminas Mažeika
