= Andro Švrljuga =

Croatian footballer

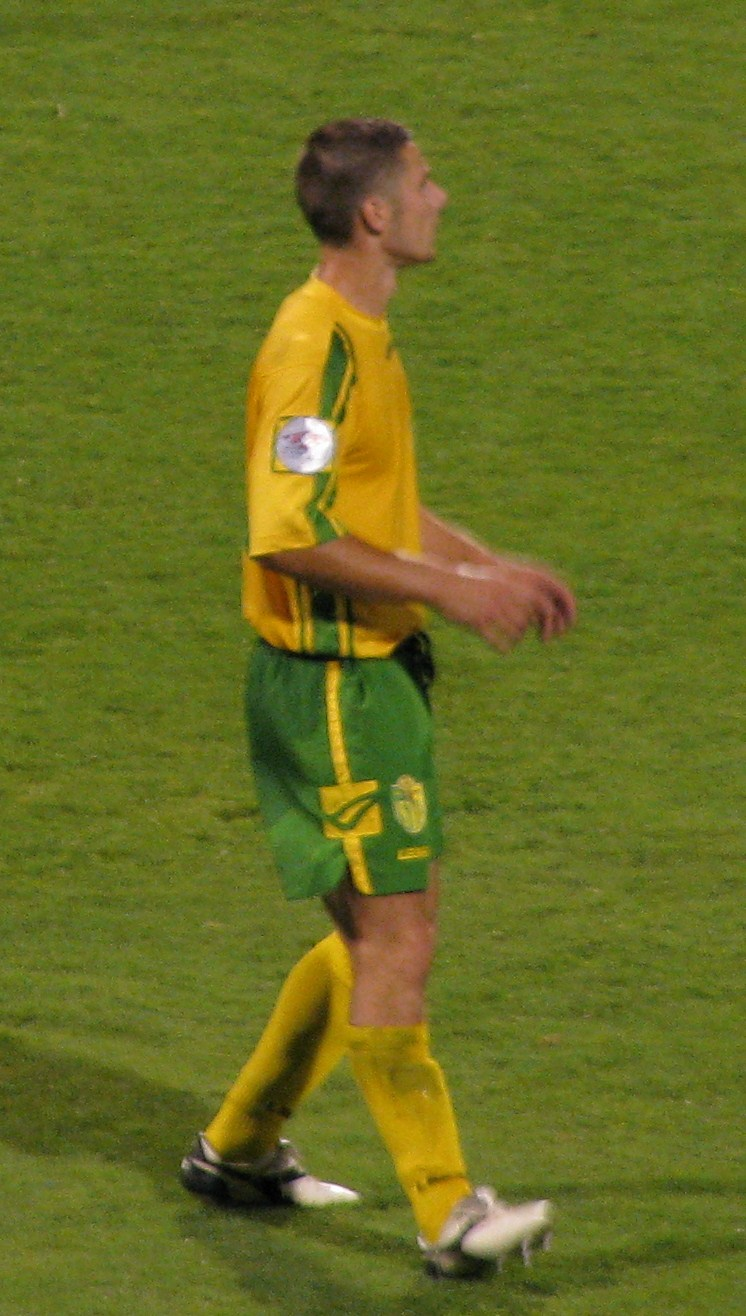
- Švrljuga in 2009

Personal information
- Date of birth: 24 October 1985 (age 41)
- Place of birth: Rijeka, SR Croatia, Yugoslavia
- Height: 1.76 m (5 ft 9 1/2 in)
- Position: Wing-back

Team information
- Current team: Opatija
- Number: 11

Senior career*
Years	Team	Apps	(Gls)
2004–2007	Pomorac	82	(4)
2007–2010	Istra 1961	75	(5)
2010–2012	Rijeka	52	(3)
2012–2016	Žalgiris	103	(15)
2016–2021	Sūduva	125	(17)
2021–2025	Orijent	91	(1)
2025–	Opatija	19	(0)
- * Club domestic league appearances and goals as of 17 June 2026

Andro Švrljuga (born 24 October 1985) is a Croatian football midfielder who plays for Opatija.

== Club career ==
Švrljuga previously played for Pomorac Kostrena, Istra 1961, Rijeka and Žalgiris . In 2017 and 2018 Švrljuga became Lithuania A Lyga champion with FK Sūduva.

== Honours ==
Sūduva

- A Lyga: 2019
- Lithuanian Football Cup: 2019

Individual

- A Lyga Team of the Year: 2018
