= Tomas Radzinevičius =

Lithuanian footballer

Personal information
- Full name: Tomas Radzinevičius
- Date of birth: 5 June 1981 (age 45)
- Place of birth: Marijampolė, Soviet Union
- Height: 1.84 m (6 ft 1/2 in)
- Position: Forward

Senior career*
Years	Team	Apps	(Gls)
1997–2005	Sūduva Marijampolė	121	(58)
2005–2009	Slovan Liberec	26	(1)
2006–2007	→ Kladno (loan)	23	(4)
2007	→ Dynamo České Budějovice (loan)	15	(4)
2009–2010	Odra Wodzisław	14	(2)
2009–2010	→ Baník Sokolov (loan)	12	(2)
2010	Senica	0	(0)
2010	→ Fotbal Třinec (loan)	8	(3)
2010–2011	Karviná	11	(2)
2011–2012	Opava	41	(14)
2013–2016	Sūduva Marijampolė	111	(62)
2017	Valletta	5	(1)

International career
2003–2008	Lithuania	21	(1)
- * Club domestic league appearances and goals

Tomas Radzinevičius (born 5 June 1981) is a Lithuanian former professional footballer who played as a striker.

Radzinevičius played for eleven different clubs throughout his career. He started professional career for a local side Sūduva and later moved to clubs in Czech Republic, Poland and Slovakia. He returned to Sūduva before 2013 season, where he took over captaincy. In 2015 season he became top scorer of the A Lyga, managing 28 goals being 34 years old. He moved to Maltese Premier League champions Valletta in the winter of 2017, but haven't received much playing time. Forward decided to end his career on 18 June 2017.

At international level, Radzinevičius represented the Lithuania national team on 21 occasions, scoring 1 goal. He made his international debut in 2003 and played his last match in 2007. Despite receiving invitations until late 2016 he never had a chance to appear for his nation once again.

== Career ==
While playing for Sūduva, he scored a hat-trick against Brann in the qualifying round of the UEFA Cup 2002–03, greatly contributing to his side's 3–2 victory. The same year he was voted the best player in A Lyga.

Radzinevičius has represented Lithuania at both under-21 and senior level, scoring one goal for his national team.

In July 2009 Radzinevičius was transferred to Polish Ekstraklasa side Odra Wodzisław.

=== International goals ===
Scores and results list Lithuania's goal tally first.

Goal	Date	Venue	Opponent	Score	Result	Competition
1.	11 November 2006	Hibernians Stadium, Paola, Malta	Malta	2–0	4–1	Friendly

== Honours ==
Slovan Liberec

- Czech First League: 2004–05

Lithuania

- Baltic Cup: 2005

Individual

- A Lyga top scorer: 2015
