= Džiugas Bartkus =

Lithuanian footballer (born 1989)

Personal information
- Full name: Džiugas Bartkus
- Date of birth: 7 November 1989 (age 37)
- Place of birth: Kaunas, Lithuanian SSR
- Height: 1.91 m (6 ft 3 in)
- Position: Goalkeeper

Team information
- Current team: Al-Riffa
- Number: 29

Senior career*
Years	Team	Apps	(Gls)
2008–2011	FBK Kaunas	18	(0)
2008	→ Kauno Jėgeriai		
2010	→ Partizan Minsk (loan)	7	(0)
2011	→ Dinamo Brest (loan)	4	(0)
2012–2015	Sūduva Marijampolė	83	(0)
2016	Górnik Łęczna	7	(0)
2016–2017	Valletta	25	(0)
2017–2018	Žalgiris	24	(0)
2018–2023	Ironi Kiryat Shmona	149	(1)
2023–2024	Al-Orobah	33	(0)
2024–2025	Al-Bukiryah	33	(0)
2025–	Al-Riffa	17	(0)

International career^{‡}
2018–	Lithuania	15	(0)
- * Club domestic league appearances and goals as of 30 June 2026 ‡ National team caps and goals as of 27 September 2026

Džiugas Bartkus (born 7 November 1989) is a Lithuanian professional footballer who plays as a goalkeeper for Bahraini club Al-Riffa and the Lithuania national team.

== Club career ==
He started his career with FBK Kaunas in 2008. During 2010 and 2011, he was loaned to Belarusian clubs Partizan Minsk and Dinamo Brest.

From 2012 to 2015, Džiugas formed part of Sudūva, a club based in the city of Marijampolė, Lithuania, where he made a total of 83 appearances.

In July 2016, Bartkus joined Maltese club Valletta on a one-year contract.

On 9 July 2017, he returned to Lithuania, when he signed a long-term contract with A Lyga champions Žalgiris.

On 12 June 2023, Bartkus joined Saudi Arabian club Al-Orobah.

On 12 July 2024, Bartkus moved to Al-Bukiryah.

On 27 July 2025, Bartkus moved to Al-Riffa.

== International career ==
In 2015, he was called into Lithuania squad for their UEFA Euro 2016 qualifying matches against England and Slovenia.

On 5 June 2018, he made a debut in the Lithuania national team in a 1–1 draw against Latvia in a Baltic Cup final.

== Career statistics ==
=== International ===
As of match played 27 September 2026

Appearances and goals by national team and year
National team	Year	Apps	Goals
Lithuania
Lithuania	2018	2	0
Lithuania	2019	3	0
Lithuania	2020	1	0
Lithuania	2022	5	0
Lithuania	2023	1	0
Lithuania	2025	1	0
Lithuania	2026	2	0
Total		15	0
