= 2007 Lithuanian football leagues =

LFF Lyga
- Season: 2007

Final tables of the Lithuanian Championship in 2007 are presented below. The Lithuanian Football Federation (LFF) organized three football leagues: A Lyga (the highest), 1 Lyga (second-tier), and 2 Lyga (third-tier), which comprised several zones. For the first time a separate league for farm teams was set up.

== A Lyga ==
| Pos | Team | Pld | W | D | L | GF | GA | GD | Pts | Qualification or relegation |
|---|---|---|---|---|---|---|---|---|---|---|
| 1 | FBK Kaunas (C) | 36 | 25 | 8 | 3 | 91 | 26 | +65 | 83 | Qualification to Champions League first qualifying round |
| 2 | Sūduva | 36 | 20 | 8 | 8 | 66 | 34 | +32 | 68 | Qualification to UEFA Cup first qualifying round |
| 3 | Ekranas | 36 | 19 | 9 | 8 | 83 | 36 | +47 | 66 | Qualification to Intertoto Cup first round |
| 4 | Žalgiris | 36 | 18 | 10 | 8 | 64 | 34 | +30 | 64 | |
| 5 | Vėtra | 36 | 18 | 7 | 11 | 55 | 30 | +25 | 61 | Qualification to UEFA Cup first qualifying round |
| 6 | Atlantas | 36 | 13 | 6 | 17 | 54 | 45 | +9 | 45 | |
| 7 | Vilnius (R) | 36 | 13 | 6 | 17 | 54 | 63 | −9 | 45 | Relegation to I Lyga |
| 8 | Šiauliai | 36 | 13 | 6 | 17 | 47 | 50 | −3 | 45 | |
| 9 | Šilutė | 36 | 6 | 4 | 26 | 28 | 86 | −58 | 22 | |
| 10 | Interas-AE (R) | 36 | 2 | 2 | 32 | 16 | 154 | −138 | 8 | Defunct after end of season |

Source: www2.omnitel.net
(C) Champions; (R) Relegated

== Farm team league ==
| Pos | Team | Pld | W | D | L | GF | GA | GD | Pts |
|---|---|---|---|---|---|---|---|---|---|
| 1 | Žalgiris-2 Vilnius | 36 | 23 | 7 | 6 | 50 | 26 | +24 | 76 |
| 2 | Vėtra-2 Vilnius | 36 | 21 | 5 | 10 | 74 | 39 | +35 | 68 |
| 3 | Sūduva-2 Marijampolė | 36 | 19 | 10 | 7 | 86 | 44 | +42 | 67 |
| 4 | FBK Kaunas-2 | 36 | 17 | 7 | 12 | 63 | 42 | +21 | 58 |
| 5 | Ekranas-2 Panevėžys | 36 | 15 | 8 | 13 | 58 | 51 | +7 | 53 |
| 6 | FK Šilutė-2 | 36 | 15 | 7 | 14 | 49 | 55 | −6 | 52 |
| 7 | FC Vilnius-2 | 36 | 14 | 8 | 14 | 68 | 57 | +11 | 50 |
| 8 | Atlantas-2 Klaipėda | 36 | 10 | 9 | 17 | 34 | 57 | −23 | 39 |
| 9 | KFK Šiauliai-2 | 36 | 7 | 8 | 21 | 30 | 60 | −30 | 29 |
| 10 | Interas-2 Visaginas | 36 | 3 | 3 | 30 | 23 | 107 | −84 | 12 |

== 1 Lyga ==
| Pos | Team | Pld | W | D | L | GF | GA | GD | Pts |
|---|---|---|---|---|---|---|---|---|---|
| 1 | Rodiklis Kaunas | 22 | 16 | 3 | 3 | 76 | 20 | +56 | 51 |
| 2 | Alytis Alytus | 22 | 14 | 5 | 3 | 61 | 14 | +47 | 47 |
| 3 | Nevėžis Kėdainiai | 22 | 13 | 6 | 3 | 44 | 17 | +27 | 45 |
| 4 | Kruoja Pakruojis | 22 | 13 | 4 | 5 | 45 | 23 | +22 | 43 |
| 5 | Lietava Jonava | 22 | 11 | 4 | 7 | 41 | 25 | +16 | 37 |
| 6 | Banga Gargždai | 22 | 9 | 7 | 6 | 42 | 12 | +30 | 34 |
| 7 | LKKA ir Teledema Kaunas | 22 | 10 | 3 | 9 | 76 | 34 | +42 | 33 |
| 8 | Kauno Jėgeriai | 22 | 7 | 6 | 9 | 34 | 30 | +4 | 27 |
| 9 | Vilkmergė Ukmergė | 22 | 5 | 3 | 14 | 31 | 60 | −29 | 18 |
| 10 | Glestum Klaipėda | 22 | 4 | 6 | 12 | 23 | 59 | −36 | 18 |
| 11 | Tauras ir Erra Tauragė | 22 | 3 | 2 | 17 | 17 | 126 | −109 | 11 |
| 12 | FK Anykščiai | 22 | 1 | 3 | 18 | 14 | 84 | −70 | 6 |

== 2 Lyga ==
=== 2 Lyga zone South ===
| Pos | Team | Pld | W | D | L | GF | GA | GD | Pts |
|---|---|---|---|---|---|---|---|---|---|
| 1 | Geležinis Vilkas Vilnius | 26 | 19 | 3 | 4 | 61 | 15 | +46 | 60 |
| 2 | Alytis-2 Alytus | 26 | 18 | 5 | 3 | 78 | 22 | +56 | 59 |
| 3 | Lifosa Kėdainiai | 26 | 17 | 3 | 6 | 52 | 36 | +16 | 54 |
| 4 | SC-Savingė Kaišiadorys | 26 | 17 | 3 | 6 | 59 | 35 | +24 | 54 |
| 5 | Vėtra-89 Vilnius | 26 | 16 | 5 | 5 | 68 | 20 | +48 | 53 |
| 6 | Vidzgiris Alytus | 26 | 15 | 4 | 7 | 76 | 41 | +35 | 49 |
| 7 | Visas Labas Kaunas | 26 | 13 | 4 | 9 | 60 | 46 | +14 | 43 |
| 8 | FK Rūdiškės | 26 | 8 | 6 | 12 | 32 | 37 | −5 | 30 |
| 9 | FK Prienai | 26 | 8 | 3 | 15 | 30 | 59 | −29 | 27 |
| 10 | Sveikata Kybartai | 26 | 8 | 1 | 17 | 54 | 81 | −27 | 25 |
| 11 | FM-Spyris Kaunas | 26 | 6 | 7 | 13 | 40 | 43 | −3 | 25 |
| 12 | Utenis Utena | 26 | 8 | 1 | 17 | 52 | 94 | −42 | 25 |
| 13 | Nevėžis-2 Kėdainiai | 26 | 4 | 2 | 20 | 23 | 82 | −59 | 14 |
| 14 | VPU Šviesa Vilnius | 14 | 2 | 1 | 11 | 22 | 47 | −25 | 7 (Note: only first round) |
| 15 | FK Kalvarija | 14 | 0 | 0 | 14 | 11 | 60 | −49 | 0 |

=== 2 Lyga zone North ===
| Pos | Team | Pld | W | D | L | GF | GA | GD | Pts |
|---|---|---|---|---|---|---|---|---|---|
| 1 | Juventa-99 Šiauliai | 20 | 16 | 1 | 3 | 74 | 21 | +53 | 49 |
| 2 | Sakuona Plikiai | 20 | 14 | 1 | 5 | 61 | 29 | +32 | 43 |
| 3 | Venta Kuršėnai | 20 | 12 | 5 | 3 | 43 | 15 | +28 | 41 |
| 4 | FK Mažeikiai | 20 | 13 | 1 | 6 | 57 | 26 | +31 | 40 |
| 5 | Mastis Telšiai | 20 | 9 | 3 | 8 | 32 | 30 | +2 | 30 |
| 6 | Bangelė Gargždai | 20 | 6 | 7 | 7 | 18 | 31 | −13 | 25 |
| 7 | SM Plungė | 20 | 7 | 4 | 9 | 19 | 33 | −14 | 25 |
| 8 | Minija Kretinga | 20 | 6 | 3 | 11 | 22 | 39 | −17 | 21 |
| 9 | Glestum-2 Klaipėda | 20 | 4 | 4 | 12 | 26 | 52 | −26 | 16 |
| 10 | FK Kretinga | 20 | 3 | 2 | 15 | 22 | 63 | −41 | 11 |
| 11 | Salantas Salantai | 20 | 2 | 5 | 13 | 18 | 53 | −35 | 11 |
