= Anatoli Shelest =

Ukrainian and Russian footballer and coach

Personal information
- Full name: Anatoli Borisovich Shelest
- Date of birth: 6 January 1955 (age 71)
- Place of birth: Oleksandriia, Kirovohrad Oblast, Ukrainian SSR
- Position: Midfielder

Youth career
- DYuSSh-2 Oleksandriia

Senior career*
Years	Team	Apps	(Gls)
1971	Shakhtar Oleksandriya		
1972–1973	Zirka Kirovohrad		
1974–1977	Dnipro Dnipropetrovsk	47	(2)
1978–1981	Lokomotiv Moscow	79	(0)
1982	Tavriya Simferopol	11	(0)
1983–1985	Zorkiy Krasnogorsk	92	(2)
1986–1987	Stahl Thale		
1987–1988	Einheit Wernigerode		
1988–1990	Motor Nordhausen		
1990	Östersunds FK		
1990–1991	SV Post Telekom Neubrandenburg		
1991–1993	Einheit Wernigerode		

Managerial career
- 1993: Interros Moskovsky (assistant)
- 1999–2000: Spartak-Chukotka Moscow
- 2000–2001: Liepājas Metalurgs
- 2002: Tom Tomsk (assistant)
- 2003: UOR Krasnolissya (assistant)
- 2003–2006: Oryol
- 2008: Rīga
- 2009: Stavropolye-2009
- 2016–2017: Oryol
- 2018: Atlantas
- * Club domestic league appearances and goals

Anatoli Borisovich Shelest (Russian: Анатолий Борисович Шелест; born 6 January 1955) is a Ukrainian and Russian professional football coach and a former player.

His son Taras Shelest is a professional footballer.
