= Darius Gvildys =

Lithuanian footballer (born 1970)

Personal information
- Date of birth: 26 December 1970 (age 55)
- Place of birth: Kaunas, Lithuanian SSR, Soviet Union
- Height: 1.90 m (6 ft 3 in)
- Position: Defender

Team information
- Current team: Nevėžis (manager)

Senior career*
| Years | Team | Apps | (Gls) |
| 1991–1992 | Banga Kaunas | 45 | (6) |
| 1993–1998 | FBK Kaunas | 113 | (11) |
| 1999 | Lokomotiv Nizhniy Novgorod | 14 | (0) |
| 2000 | Arsenal Tula | 26 | (1) |
| 2001–2004 | FBK Kaunas | 90 | (9) |
| 2004 | Liepājas Metalurgs | 17 | (3) |
| 2005–2007 | Sūduva | 65 | (1) |

International career
| 1996–1999 | Lithuania | 11 | (2) |

Managerial career
- 2007: Šilutė
- 2008–2009: FBK Kaunas (assistant)
- 2009–2010: Spyris (assistant)
- 2010–2011: FBK Kaunas
- 2011–2012: Tauras (assistant)
- 2012–2014: Sūduva
- 2015–2016: Stumbras
- 2016–2017: DFK Dainava
- 2017–2018: Jonava (assistant)
- 2018: Jonava
- 2021: Nevėžis B
- 2021–: Nevėžis
- * Club domestic league appearances and goals

Darius Gvildys (born 26 December 1970) is a Lithuanian football coach and a former defender. He is the manager of FK Nevėžis.

== Club career ==
Gvildys began his career in Banga Kaunas before moving to FBK Kaunas. Afterward, he relocated to Russia, where he played for FC Lokomotiv Nizhniy Novgorod, and, starting in 2000, FC Arsenal Tula.

In 2004, he joined Latvian Virsliga while playing for Liepājas Metalurgs. The following year, he played for Lithuanian Sūduva Club. After retiring as a player in 2007, Gvildys became a coach for FK Šilas Kazlų Rūda.

== International career ==
Gvildys made 11 appearances for the Lithuania national football team between 1996 and 1999.
