= Vladimir Cheburin =

Kazakh football manager

Personal information
- Full name: Vladimir Nikolayevich Cheburin
- Date of birth: 7 May 1965 (age 61)
- Place of birth: Karaganda, Kazakh SSR, Soviet Union
- Position: Defender

Managerial career
- Years: Team
- 2009–2010: FC Shakhter Karagandy
- 2011–2013: FC Okzhetpes
- 2014: FK Kruoja Pakruojis
- 2014–2015: FC Shakhter Karagandy
- 2016–2019: FK Sūduva
- 2021–2025: FK Žalgiris

Vladimir Nikolayevich Cheburin (Russian: Владимир Николаевич Чебурин; born 7 June 1965) Kazakh football manager who was the head coach of FK Žalgiris in Lithuania.

== Career ==
Cheburin started his managerial career with Shakhter Karagandy. In 2011, he was appointed head coach of Okzhetpes in the Kazakhstan Premier League, a position he held until 2013. After that, he coached Lithuanian clubs FK Kruoja Pakruojis, FK Sūduva and FK Žalgiris.

On 31 August 2025 announced, that Cheburin left FK Žalgiris.

== Managerial statistics ==
As of 12 November 2023

Managerial record by team and tenure
| Team | Nat | From | To | Record | | | | | | | |
| Team | Nat | From | To | G | W | D | L | GF | GA | GD | Win % |
|---|---|---|---|---|---|---|---|---|---|---|---|
| Shakhter Karagandy | (Kazakhstan) | 16 October 2008 | 15 October 2010 | 71 | 39 | 13 | 19 | 119 | 58 | +61 | 54.93 |
| Okzhetpes | (Kazakhstan) | 1 January 2011 | 1 February 2013 | 23 | 6 | 2 | 15 | 25 | 42 | −17 | 26.09 |
| FK Kruoja Pakruojis | (Lithuania) | 21 February 2014 | 10 December 2014 | 36 | 19 | 9 | 8 | 67 | 34 | +33 | 52.78 |
| Shakhter Karagandy | (Kazakhstan) | 11 December 2014 | 6 May 2015 | 11 | 1 | 2 | 8 | 8 | 20 | −12 | 9.09 |
| FK Sūduva | (Lithuania) | 8 September 2016 | 31 December 2019 | 134 | 90 | 21 | 23 | 296 | 111 | +185 | 67.16 |
| FK Žalgiris | (Lithuania) | 11 January 2021 | Present | 142 | 82 | 29 | 31 | 269 | 145 | +124 | 57.75 |
| Total | | | | 417 | 237 | 76 | 104 | 784 | 410 | +374 | 56.83 |
