= Algimantas Briaunys =

Lithuanian footballer and coach

Personal information
- Date of birth: 3 November 1964 (age 61)
- Place of birth: Sovetsk, Russian SFSR
- Height: 1.86 m (6 ft 1 in)
- Position: Goalkeeper

Senior career*
Years	Team	Apps	(Gls)
1983–1988	Atlantas		
1989	Žalgiris	0	(0)
1990	Sirijus Klaipėda		
1990–1991	Iveria Khashuri	30	(0)
1991	Pardaugava Riga	14	(0)
1992	Asmaral Moscow	1	(0)
1992–1993	Halychyna Drohobych	54	(0)
1994–1995	Flora	33	(0)
1996	FC Copenhagen	1	(0)
1996	Lelle SK	6	(0)
1996–1998	Žalgiris	32	(0)
1998–2001	Liepājas Metalurgs	63	(0)
2002	Atlantas	5	(0)

International career
1996–1997	Lithuania	4	(0)

Managerial career
- 2003–2004: Atlantas
- 2004: Oryol (assistant)
- 2009–2010: Banga Gargždai
- 2011–2012: Levadia (assistant)
- 2012–2013: Sillamäe Kalev
- 2016–2017: Sillamäe Kalev
- 2017–2018: Atlantas (assistant)
- 2018: Atlantas
- 2019: Palanga (assistant)
- 2019: Palanga
- 2020–2021: Maardu Linnameeskond
- * Club domestic league appearances and goals

Algimantas Briaunys (born 3 November 1964) is a Lithuanian professional football coach and a former goalkeeper. He played the position of goalkeeper. He won a total of four international caps for the Lithuania national football team.

== Coaching career ==
From 2003 to 2004, Briaunys was manager of FK Atlantas. In 2005, he then worked as goalkeeper coach for FC Flora and later from 2006 to 2008 for FCI Levadia Tallinn. In 2009, Briaunys was appointed manager of Banga Gargždai. He left in 2010 and became assistant manager of FCI Levadia Tallinn in 2011 and later also goalkeeper coach at the club.

At the end of 2011, Briaunys was hired as goalkeeper coach of JK Sillamäe Kalev and in September 2012, he was appointed manager of the club. He left the manager post in April 2013 and continued as goalkeeper coach of the club.

In July 2019, he joined Palanga as assistant manager and in September 2019, he became manager for the rest of the season after the departure of Viačeslavu Geraščenka.

== Honours ==
Flora

- Meistriliiga champion: 1993–94, 1994–95
- Meistriliiga runner-up: 1995–96
- Estonian Cup winner: 1994–95

Žalgiris

- A Lyga runner-up: 1996–97, 1997–98
- Lithuanian Football Cup winner: 1997

Liepājas Metalurgs

- Latvian Higher League runner-up: 1998, 1999
- Latvian Higher League bronze: 2000, 2001

Atlantas

- A Lyga runner-up: 2002

=== Individual ===
- Meistriliiga Manager of the Month: June/July 2016
