= FK Atlantas =

Association football club in Lithuania

- Full name: Football Club Atlantas
- Founded: 1962; 64 years ago
- Dissolved: 2020; 6 years ago
- Ground: Central Stadium of Klaipėda
- Capacity: 4,428
- 2020: 4th 2 Lyga (Western Zone)
Home colours	Away colours

FK Atlantas was a Lithuanian professional football club based in the port city of Klaipėda. The club was established in 1962 as Granitas and became PSK Aras in 1993. Since 1996, when FK Sirijus Klaipėda was absorbed into the club, it has had the name Atlantas, which in Lithuanian means 'Atlantic Ocean'. The club dissolved in 2020.

Atlantas were the SSR Lithuanian champions in 1978, 1980, 1981, and 1984.

== History ==
The modern-day Atlantas was founded in 1996. During the Soviet occupation of Klaipėda, the team was known as Granitas. Atlantas was a farm club of Granitas from 1970. The name Atlantas was used in Lithuanian championships and Granitas in Soviet Union championships. During the period of Lithuanian independence from 1990, the tradition of using Granitas and Atlantas was lost, but in 1996, the team was reestablished and named Atlantas.

In summer 2018, the club had financial problems because its bank accounts were suspended. The club owners considered all possibilities to save the club from dissolution. In the first half of the 2018 A Lyga, the club was in fourth position; after the summer, they failed to win any games in the championship and lost their position. After 28 rounds, however, they were in sixth position and could play in the final stage of the championship. The 29th round was a loss to FC Stumbras 0–6.

In January 2019, it was reported that the club lost its sponsorships from businesses and the City of Klaipėda, meaning the club would soon become defunct.

In February 2019, the club changed owners. The new chief was Vidas Adomaitis.

On 5 December 2019, the Lithuanian Football Federation announced that two A Lyga clubs, FK Atlantas and FK Palanga, had been excluded from the A Lyga, fined €30,000 and had been relegated to II Lyga due to manipulation of match results. Five players were punished with fines and a ban from all football activity ranging from 6 to 12 months.

In 2020, Atlantas was in Antra lyga (3rd level), and after the first round was one of the top six teams. In the final stages, the team had chances for promotion to Pirma lyga.

== Name history ==
- 1962 – Granitas Klaipėda
- 1970 – Atlantas Klaipėda
- 1996 – FK Atlantas Klaipėda

== Honours ==
=== Domestic ===
- Lithuanian Championship
  - Runners-up (3): 2001, 2002, 2013
  - Third place (5): 1999, 2000, 2004, 2014, 2015
- Lithuanian Cup
  - Winners (2): 2001, 2003
  - Runners-up (2): 2004, 2014–15

Soviet Championship

- Lithuanian SSR Championship
  - Champions (4): 1978, 1980, 1981, 1984
- Soviet Second League
  - Winners (2): 1964, 1985
- Lithuanian SSR Cup
  - Winners (4): 1977, 1981, 1983, 1986

=== Other tournaments ===
- Turkmenistan President's Cup
  - Third place (1): 2003

== Supporters ==
FK Atlantas supporters were called Vakarų Frontas. They maintained friendly relations with fans of Žalgiris Vilnius and Rangers FC.

== Crest and colours ==
The crest features a yellow seahorse with a football on the background. In the middle of the crest is white text stating Atlantas at the top and Klaipėda in smaller text under it. The logo contains some white.

Since the beginning, the club has used the colors yellow and blue on their kits.

Traditional kit Home	Traditional kit Away	Traditional kit Away	2007/2008; 2015 (Away)	Puma; 2017 (Home)	Puma; 2017 (Away)	Goalkeeper`s kit 2018

=== Kit manufacturers ===
- 2013–2016: Jako
- 2017–2018: Puma
- 2018–present: Adidas

== Season-by-season ==
Lithuania

Season	Div.	Pos.	Pl.	W	D	L	Goals	Top Scorer	Cup	Europe
1999	1st	3	18	9	6	3	34–24			
2000	1st	3	36	21	4	11	70–45			
2001	1st	2	36	19	12	5	66–29			
2002	1st	2	32	20	7	5	58–23			
2003	1st	5	28	9	6	13	27–30			
2004	1st	3	28	15	5	8	36–29			
2005	1st	7	36	11	8	17	40–52			
2006	1st	6	36	14	10	12	46–41			
2007	1st	6	36	13	6	17	54–45			
2008	1st	6	28	7	7	14	31–44			
2009	3rd	1	20	18	2	0	101–11	Gintas Podelis		
2010	2nd	7	27	9	6	12	35–33	Žilvinas Kymantas		
2011	1st	11	33	3	2	28	28–121	Karolis Laukžemis		
2012	1st	8	36	7	6	23	33–92	Tino Lagator		
2013	1st	2	32	22	5	5	64–23	Evaldas Razulis		
2014	1st	3	36	19	8	9	76–36	Evaldas Razulis		
2015	1st	3	36	21	7	8	65–34	Andrey Panyukov		
2016	1st	4	33	16	8	9	42–32	Maksim Maksimov		
2017	1st	5	33	8	12	13	39–43	Andrey Panyukov		
2018	1st	6	33	6	6	21	28–75			
2019	1st	6	33	7	5	21	30–78			

== 2020 squad ==
As of 20 April 2020

Note: Flags indicate national team as defined under FIFA eligibility rules; some limited exceptions apply. Players may hold more than one non-FIFA nationality.

No.	Pos.	Nation	Player
1	GK	LTU	Lukas Paukštė
4	DF	LTU	Tautvydas Špiegis
5	DF	LTU	Marius Činikas
6	DF	LTU	Andrius Bartkus
7	FW	BDI	Bonfils-Caleb Bimenyimana
8	MF	LTU	Vytautas Lukša
9	FW	LTU	Tadas Labukas
10	FW	LTU	Darvydas Šernas
12	GK	BUL	Stefano Kunchev
13	MF	LTU	Vilius Armanavičius
14	DF	LTU	Jonas Latakas

No.	Pos.	Nation	Player
16	DF	CRO	Damir Žutić
19	MF	CRO	Jurica Kovačić
20	FW	LVA	Deivids Dobrecovs
22	MF	LVA	Ņikita Juhņevičs
23	MF	LTU	Titas Vitukynas
24	MF	LTU	Justas Vainikaitis
27	MF	BUL	Dimitar Petkov
28	DF	LTU	Tomas Gvazdinskas
44	MF	NGA	Akinjide Idowu
77	MF	CRO	Mateo Dunić

== Notable and famous players ==
FK Atlantas players who have either appeared for their respective national team at any time or received an individual award while at the club.

Lithuania

- (Lithuania) Robertas Poškus (1996–1997)
- (Lithuania) Tomas Danilevičius (1995–1996)
- (Lithuania) Raimondas Žutautas (1995)
- (Lithuania) Darvydas Šernas
- (Lithuania) Linas Pilibaitis
- (Lithuania) Kęstutis Ivaškevičius
- (Lithuania) Andrius Jokšas
- (Lithuania) Rimantas Žvingilas
- (Lithuania) Valdas Trakys
- (Lithuania) Vladimiras Buzmakovas
- (Lithuania) Darius Žutautas
- (Lithuania) Audrius Kšanavičius
- (Lithuania) Mindaugas Panka
- (Lithuania) Edvinas Gertmonas
- (Lithuania) Nerijus Barasa
- (Lithuania) Tadas Labukas
- (Lithuania) Arūnas Šuika
- (Lithuania) Remigijus Pocius
- (Lithuania) Vidas Alunderis
- (Lithuania) Andrius Gedgaudas
- (Lithuania) Rolandas Baravykas
- (Lithuania) Ovidijus Verbickas
- (Lithuania) Saulius Mikalajūnas
- (Lithuania) Valdemaras Martinkėnas
- (Lithuania) Audrius Žuta
- (Lithuania) Viktoras Olšanskis
- (Lithuania) Tomas Žiukas
- (Lithuania) Vadimas Petrenko

Europe

- (England) Adebayo Akinfenwa (2001–2002)
- (Slovenia) Jalen Pokorn
- (Russia) Andrei Panyukov
- (Russia) Yuri Kirillov
- (Belarus) Dzmitry Mazalewski

South America

- (Brazil) Leandro da Silva

Africa

- (Guinea) Pascal Feindouno (2016)

Asia

- (Japan) Minoru Takenaka (2000–2003)

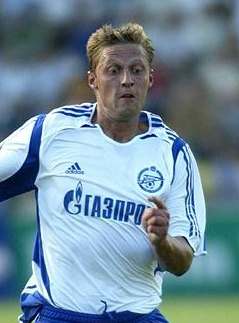
Robertas Poškus

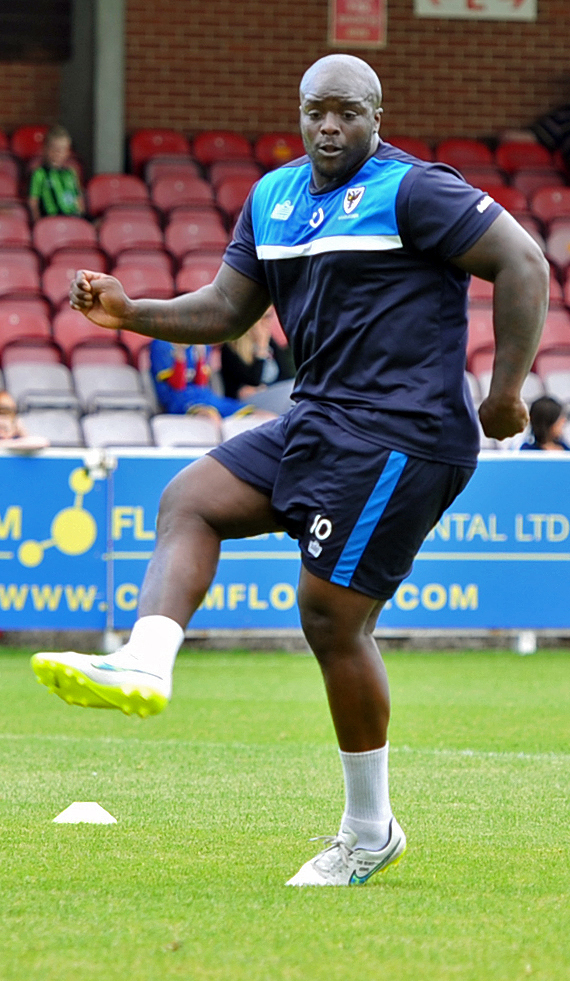
Adebayo Akinfenwa

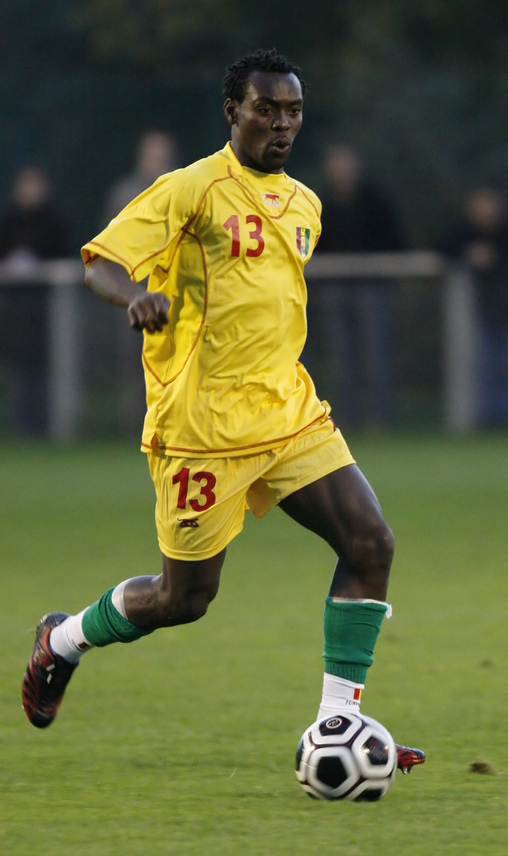
Pascal Feindouno

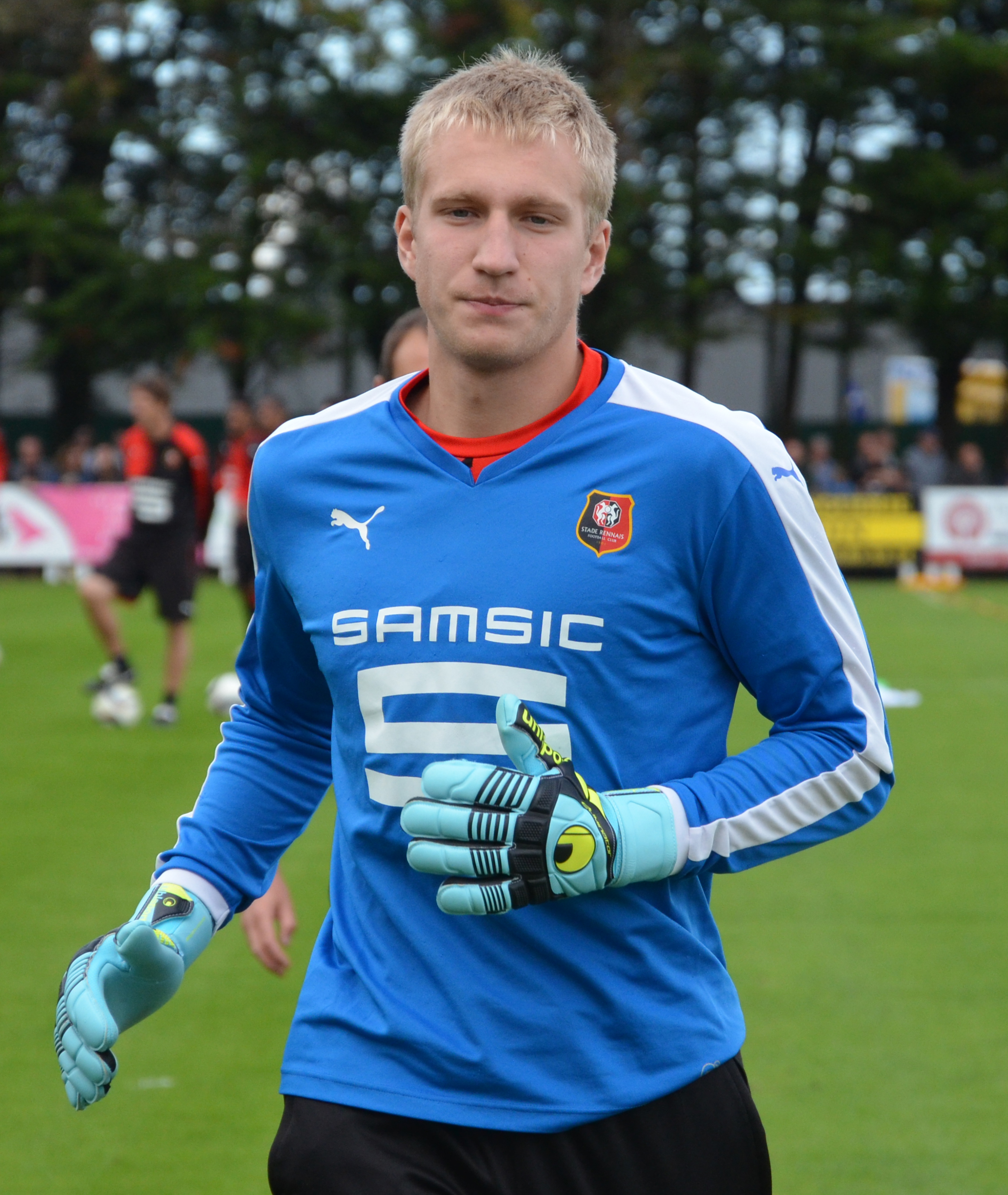
Edvinas Gertmonas

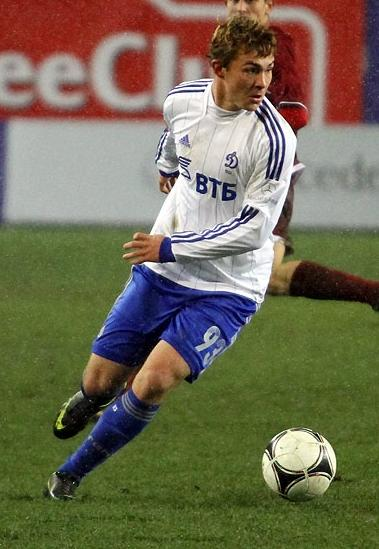
Andrei Panyukov

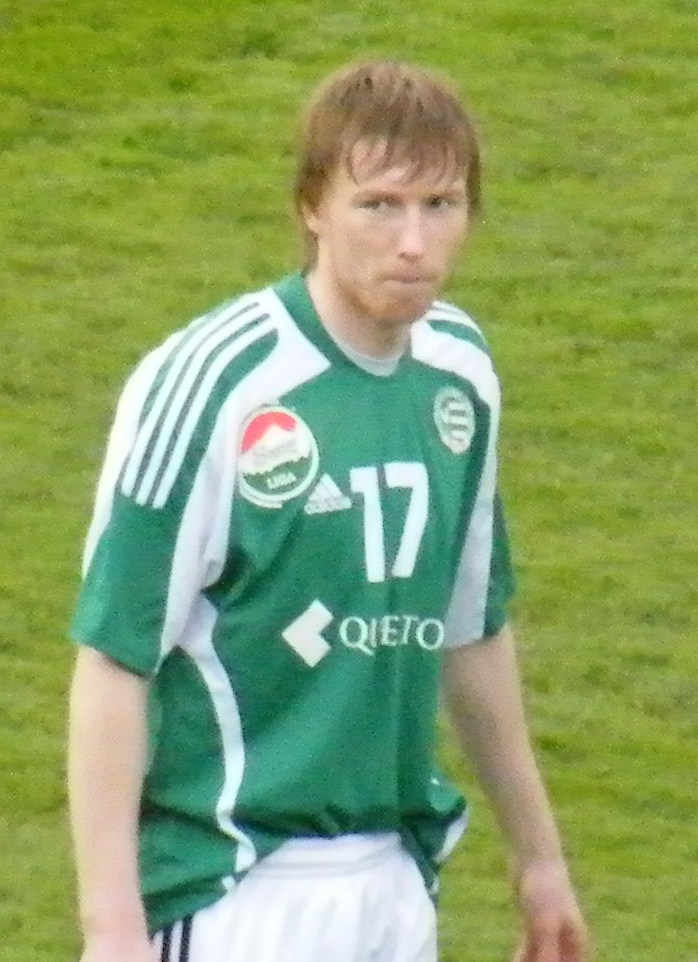
Linas Pilibaitis

== European cups history ==
Season	Competition	Round	Club	1st Leg	2nd Leg	Aggregate
2000	UEFA Intertoto Cup	1R	(Turkey) Kocaelispor	1–0	0–1	1–1 (5–3 p)
2000	UEFA Intertoto Cup	2R	(England) Bradford City	1–4	1–3	2–7
2001–02	UEFA Cup	QR	(Romania) Rapid București	0–4	0–8	0–12
2002–03	UEFA Cup	QR	(Bulgaria) Litex Lovech	0–5	1–3	1–8
2003–04	UEFA Cup	QR	(Poland) Dyskobolia Grodzisk	0–2	1–4	1–6
2004	UEFA Intertoto Cup	1R	(Russia) Spartak Moscow	1–0	0–2	1–2
2005–06	UEFA Cup	1Q	(Wales) Rhyl	3–2	1–2	4–4 (a)
2014–15	UEFA Europa League	1Q	(Luxembourg) FC Differdange 03	0–1	3–1	3–2
2014–15	UEFA Europa League	2Q	(Kazakhstan) Shakhter Karagandy	0–0	0–3	0–3
2015–16	UEFA Europa League	1Q	(Bulgaria) Beroe Stara Zagora	0–2	1–3	1–5
2016–17	UEFA Europa League	1Q	(Finland) HJK	0–2	1–1	1–3
2017–18	UEFA Europa League	1Q	(Kazakhstan) Kairat	0–6	1–2	1–8

== 2020 staff ==
Position	Name
President	(Lithuania) Vidas Adomaitis
Director of football	(Lithuania) Arnas Lekevičius
Head coach	(Latvia) Viktors Dobrecovs

== Managers ==
- (Lithuanian Soviet Socialist Republic) Algirdas Klimkevičius (19??–66)
- (Lithuanian Soviet Socialist Republic) Algirdas Vosylius (1967–??)
- (Lithuanian Soviet Socialist Republic) Romualdas Dambrauskas (19??–70)
- (Lithuanian Soviet Socialist Republic) Henrikas Markevičius (1976–78)
- (Lithuanian Soviet Socialist Republic) Fiodoras Finkelis (1978)
- (Lithuanian Soviet Socialist Republic) Vladas Ulinauskas (1980)
- (Lithuanian Soviet Socialist Republic) Romas Lavrinavičius (1981)
- (Lithuanian Soviet Socialist Republic) Algirdas Mitigaila (1982–83)
- (Lithuanian Soviet Socialist Republic) Česlovas Urbonavičius (1984–86)
- (Lithuanian Soviet Socialist Republic) Vytautas Gedgaudas (1986–89)
- (Lithuanian Soviet Socialist Republic) Česlovas Urbonavičius (1984)
- (Lithuania) Vytautas Gedgaudas (1992 – March 95)
- (Lithuania) Algirdas Mitigaila (March 1995–00)
- (Lithuania) Arūnas Šuika (2000)
- (Lithuania) Vacys Lekevičius (2001–04)
- (Lithuania) Šenderis Giršovičius (2002)
- (Lithuania) Igoris Pankratjevas (2003–05)
- (Lithuania) Vacys Lekevičius (2005)
- (Lithuania) Igoris Pankratjevas (2006)
- (Lithuania) Arminas Narbekovas (2006–07)
- (Lithuania) Mindaugas Čepas (2008–09)
- (Lithuania) Šenderis Giršovičius (2009–10)
- (Lithuania) Saulius Mikalajūnas (23 Dec 2009 – 20 May 2010)
- (Lithuania) Igoris Pankratjevas (2010)
- (Lithuania) Vitalijus Stankevičius (2011)
- (Lithuania) Romualdas Norkus (1 March 2012 – 30 June 2012)
- (France) Sébastien Roques (July 2012 – Nov 2012)
- (Russia) Konstantin Sarsania (1 Jan 2013 – 27 May 2017)
- (Russia) Sergej Savchenkov (28 May 2017 – 13 June 2017)
- (Lithuania) Rimantas Žvingilas (13 Jun 2017 – 23 July 2017)
- (Lithuania) Igoris Pankratjevas (23 Jul 2017–end of 2017)
- (Lithuania) Algimantas Briaunys (January 2018– 30 August 2018)
- (Ukraine) Anatoli Shelest (September 2018 – November 2018)
- (Latvia) Viktors Dobrecovs (February 2019 – November 2019)
- (Lithuania) Donatas Navikas (in November 2019; temporary)
