= 1987 Soviet Top League =

50th season of top-tier football league in Soviet Union

Soviet Top League
- Season: 1987
- Dates: March 9 — November 16, 1987
- Champions: Spartak Moscow (11th title)
- Relegated: CSKA Moscow; Guria Lanchkhuti
- European Cup: Spartak Moscow
- Cup Winners' Cup: Metalist Kharkiv
- UEFA Cup: Dnepr Dnepropetrovsk; Žalgiris Vilnius; Torpedo Moscow; Dinamo Minsk
- Matches: 240
- Goals: 510 (2.13 per match)
- Top goalscorer: (18) Oleh Protasov (Dnepr)

In the 1987 season, the Soviet Top League – the top tier of football in the Soviet Union – was won by Spartak Moscow interrupting the two year championship run of the Kyiv's team. Dynamo Kyiv, the defending 12-times champions, placed sixth and failed to qualify for the European competitions, while their rivals Dynamo Moscow placed only 10th.

This season CSKA Moscow were relegated on additional criteria when they tied on points with Zenit Leningrad at the final standing.

== Teams ==
=== Promoted teams ===
- FC CSKA Moscow – champion (returning after two seasons)
- FC Guria Lanchkhuti – 2nd place (debut)

=== Location ===
Locations of teams in the 1989 Top League

== Final standings ==
Pos	Team	Pld	W	D	L	GF	GA	GD	Pts	Qualification or relegation
1	(Russian Soviet Federative Socialist Republic) Spartak Moscow (Note: 1 point deducted (10 draw limited)) (C)	30	16	11	3	49	26	+23	42	Qualification for European Cup first round
2	(Ukrainian Soviet Socialist Republic) Dnipro Dnipropetrovsk	30	15	9	6	42	22	+20	39	Qualification for UEFA Cup first round
3	(Lithuanian Soviet Socialist Republic) Žalgiris Vilnius	30	14	8	8	43	29	+14	36	Qualification for UEFA Cup first round
4	(Russian Soviet Federative Socialist Republic) Torpedo Moscow (Note: 2 points deducted (10 draw limited))	30	12	12	6	35	25	+10	34	Qualification for UEFA Cup first round
5	(Byelorussian Soviet Socialist Republic) Dinamo Minsk	30	12	9	9	33	25	+8	33	Qualification for UEFA Cup first round
6	(Ukrainian Soviet Socialist Republic) Dynamo Kyiv	30	11	10	9	37	27	+10	32	
7	(Ukrainian Soviet Socialist Republic) Shakhtar Donetsk	30	10	10	10	29	31	−2	30	
8	(Armenian Soviet Socialist Republic) Ararat Yerevan	30	13	3	14	32	45	−13	29	
9	(Azerbaijan Soviet Socialist Republic) Neftchi Baku	30	9	10	11	33	30	+3	28 (Note: Neftchi had more head-to-head points than Dynamo Moscow)	
10	(Russian Soviet Federative Socialist Republic) Dinamo Moscow	30	9	11	10	27	30	−3	28	
11	(Ukrainian Soviet Socialist Republic) Metalist Kharkiv	30	10	7	13	23	32	−9	27	Qualification for Cup Winners' Cup first round
12	(Kazakh Soviet Socialist Republic) Kairat Alma-Ata	30	10	6	14	27	38	−11	26	
13	(Georgian Soviet Socialist Republic) Dinamo Tbilisi	30	9	7	14	31	40	−9	25	
14	(Russian Soviet Federative Socialist Republic) Zenit Leningrad	30	7	10	13	25	37	−12	24 (Note: Zenit had more head-to-head points than CSKA)	
15	(Russian Soviet Federative Socialist Republic) CSKA Moscow (R)	30	7	11	12	26	35	−9	24	Relegation to First League
16	(Georgian Soviet Socialist Republic) Guria Lanchkhuti (R)	30	5	8	17	18	38	−20	18	Relegation to First League

Source: rsssf.com
Rules for classification: 1) Total points (If two or more teams have equal points for the first place, the winner is determined by additional single round-robin play-off on condition and place determined by the Federation); 2) Total wins; 3) Head-to-head results (3.1. points 3.2. goal difference); 4) Total games scored; 5) Total goal difference; 6) Draw lots
(C) Champions; (R) Relegated
Notes:

Promotion

- Lokomotiv Moscow (Russian SFSR)
- Chornomorets Odessa (Ukrainian SSR)

== Results ==
Home \ Away	ARA	CSK	DNI	DYK	DMN	DYN	DTB	GUR	KAI	MKH	NEF	SHA	TOR	SPA	ŽAL	ZEN
Ararat Yerevan		3–0	2–1	0–0	1–2	2–0	2–1	3–2	3–2	1–0	1–0	2–1	1–0	3–2	1–2	2–1
CSKA Moscow	1–0		1–1	0–2	1–0	2–2	2–1	0–0	2–0	2–0	0–0	1–2	1–1	0–2	2–2	1–1
Dnipro	2–0	0–0		1–0	2–2	1–1	3–0	3–1	0–0	2–0	1–0	3–1	1–0	1–2	2–1	6–1
Dynamo Kyiv	7–0	1–2	1–2		2–0	0–1	3–1	2–1	1–1	2–1	2–1	0–0	2–2	0–1	3–1	1–0
Dinamo Minsk	3–1	1–0	1–0	2–0		1–0	0–0	3–0	2–0	0–0	1–3	0–0	3–1	0–0	1–1	3–0
Dynamo Moscow	5–1	1–0	0–1	0–0	1–1		0–1	1–0	1–0	2–2	0–0	0–1	2–1	1–1	1–0	2–1
Dinamo Tbilisi	1–0	1–0	0–2	1–2	3–1	1–1		2–0	3–0	3–1	2–0	2–1	2–2	1–3	1–2	0–0
Guria Lanchkhuti	2–0	1–1	1–2	0–0	2–1	2–1	0–0		2–0	0–1	1–0	0–2	0–3	0–2	0–2	1–1
Kairat Alma-Ata	0–1	0–2	2–1	1–1	2–1	1–0	3–0	1–0		1–0	3–1	3–1	0–0	0–0	2–2	1–0
Metalist Kharkiv	1–0	2–1	1–0	2–2	0–1	1–1	2–1	0–0	1–0		0–2	1–0	0–0	0–0	1–0	0–1
Neftçi Baku	0–0	1–1	0–1	3–1	0–0	2–1	3–0	2–2	6–0	1–2		1–0	0–0	0–2	1–0	2–1
Shakhtar Donetsk	2–1	1–1	1–1	1–0	0–0	0–0	1–0	2–0	1–0	3–1	1–0		1–2	0–0	1–1	1–1
Torpedo Moscow	3–1	2–1	1–0	1–1	0–1	2–0	1–0	1–0	2–1	1–0	1–1	1–1		0–2	1–1	1–1
Spartak Moscow	2–0	3–1	2–2	0–0	2–1	1–1	1–1	1–0	2–1	2–1	4–1	3–0	1–1		3–0	1–3
Žalgiris Vilnius	2–0	3–0	0–0	1–0	2–1	4–0	3–1	0–0	1–0	2–0	1–1	3–2	0–1	5–2		1–0
Zenit Leningrad	0–0	1–0	0–0	0–1	1–0	0–1	1–1	1–0	1–2	1–2	1–1	3–1	0–3	2–2	1–0	

Legend: Blue = home team win; Yellow = draw; Red = away team win.

== Top scorers ==
18 goals

- Oleh Protasov (Dnipro Dnipropetrovsk)

16 goals

- Arminas Narbekovas (Žalgiris)

12 goals

- Fyodor Cherenkov (Spartak Moscow)
- Sergei Rodionov (Spartak Moscow)

10 goals

- Georgi Kondratyev (Dinamo Minsk)
- Yuri Savichev (Torpedo Moscow)

9 goals

- Alexei Mikhailichenko (Dynamo Kyiv)
- Yevstafi Pekhlevanidi (Kairat)
- Ramaz Shengelia (Dynamo Tbilisi)

8 goals

- Ihor Belanov (Dynamo Kyiv)

== Clean sheets ==
15 matches

- Andrei Satsunkevich (Dinamo Minsk)

14 matches

- Rinat Dasayev (Spartak Moscow)

10 matches

- Viktor Chanov (Dynamo Kyiv)

6 matches

- Vyacheslav Chanov (CSKA Moscow)

4 matches

- Dmitri Kharine (Dynamo Moscow)

3 matches

- Aleksandr Zhidkov (Neftchi Baku)
- Jurkus Vatslovas (Zalgiris Vilnius)
- Serhiy Zolotnytskyi (Shakhtar Donetsk)

== Medal squads ==
(league appearances and goals listed in brackets)

1. FC Spartak Moscow

Goalkeepers: Rinat Dasayev (29), Stanislav Cherchesov (2).
Defenders: Vagiz Khidiyatullin (29 / 3), Aleksandr Bubnov (28 / 1), Yuri Susloparov (23), Boris Kuznetsov (19), Almir Kayumov (18), Aleksandr Bokiy (15), Yuri Surov (8).
Midfielders: Fyodor Cherenkov (27 / 12), Viktor Pasulko (26 / 7), Aleksandr Mostovoi (18 / 6), Yevgeni Kuznetsov (17), Aleksei Yeryomenko (11 / 1), Sergei Novikov (9), Babken Melikian (8 / 1), Andrei Mitin (8), Vladimir Kapustin (3).
Forwards: Sergey Rodionov (26 / 12), Valeri Shmarov (26 / 5), Mikheil Meskhi (16 / 1), Oleg Kuzhlev (3), Andrei Rudakov (2), Mikhail Rusyayev (2), Viktor Kolyadko (1).

Manager: Konstantin Beskov.

Transferred out during the season: Aleksei Yeryomenko (to FC Rostselmash Rostov-on-Don), Babken Melikian (to FC Kotayk Abovian), Andrei Rudakov (to FC Torpedo Moscow), Mikhail Rusyayev (to FC Lokomotiv Moscow), Viktor Kolyadko (to FC Terek Grozny).

2. FC Dnepr Dnepropetrovsk

Goalkeepers: Valeriy Horodov (28), Serhiy Krakovskyi (2).
Defenders: Sergei Bashkirov (30), Ivan Vyshnevskyi (29 / 1), Oleksiy Cherednyk (29), Serhiy Puchkov (20), Oleksandr Sorokalet (17), Volodymyr Gerashchenko (2), Oleksandr Lysenko (2), Oleh Fediukov (1).
Midfielders: Hennadiy Lytovchenko (28 / 6), Vadym Tyshchenko (26 / 3), Anton Shokh (25 / 3), Mykola Kudrytsky (15), Volodymyr Bahmut (10).
Forwards: Oleh Protasov (30 / 18), Oleh Taran (29 / 6), Yevhen Shakhov (28 / 3), Volodymyr Lyutyi (27 / 1), Vasyl Storchak (9 / 1).

Manager: Yevhen Kucherevskyi.

Transferred out during the season: none.

3. FK Žalgiris Vilnius

Goalkeepers: Vaclovas Jurkus (18), Almantas Kalinauskas (13).
Defenders: Vyacheslav Sukristov (29 / 6), Sigitas Jakubauskas (29 / 2), Romas Mažeikis (29), Arvydas Janonis (29), Igoris Pankratjevas (27 / 3), Vladimiras Buzmakovas (23), Robertas Tautkus (9), Arūnas Žėkas (2).
Midfielders: Vidmantas Rasiukas (30 / 1), Valdas Ivanauskas (25 / 7), Algimantas Mackevičius (20 / 2), Virginijus Baltušnikas (4), Viktoras Bridaitis (4), Stasys Tamulevičius (2).
Forwards: Arminas Narbekovas (30 / 16), Stasys Baranauskas (28 / 5), Kęstutis Ruzgys (23 / 1), Gintaras Kviliūnas (5), Gediminas Sugzda (2), Robertas Fridrikas (1).

Manager: Benjaminas Zelkevičius.

Transferred out during the season: none.

== Number of teams by union republic ==
Rank	Union republic	Number of teams	Club(s)
1	RSFSR	5	CSKA Moscow, Dinamo Moscow, Spartak Moscow, Torpedo Moscow, Zenit Leningrad
2	Ukrainian SSR	4	Dinamo Kiev, Dnepr Dnepropetrovsk, Metallist Kharkov, Shakhter Donetsk
3	Georgian SSR	2	Dinamo Tbilisi, Guria Lanchkhuti
4	Armenian SSR	1	Ararat Yerevan
4	Azerbaijan SSR	1	Neftchi Baku
4	Belarusian SSR	1	Dinamo Minsk
4	Kazakh SSR	1	Kairat Alma-Ata
4	Lithuanian SSR	1	Zhalgiris Vilnius

== Attendances ==
No.	Club	Average	Change	Highest
1	Dynamo Kyiv	58,113	71,4%	98,000
2	Ararat	43,127	16,1%	62,300
3	Neftçhi	36,860	188,7%	37,600
4	Spartak Moscow	36,700	83,8%	95,000
5	Shakhtar Donetsk	30,153	21,5%	40,000
6	Dinamo Tbilisi	28,700	-22,8%	42,700
7	Kairat	27,407	176,8%	30,000
8	Dnipro	24,367	18,8%	32,000
9	Dinamo Minsk	22,907	72,6%	50,500
10	Metalist Kharkiv	22,727	42,8%	35,000
11	Zenit	21,333	-12,4%	50,000
12	Guria	20,633	95,1%	23,200
13	Dynamo Moscow	16,507	22,0%	50,000
14	PFC CSKA	14,320	166,6%	47,000
15	Žalgiris	11,540	70,4%	16,000
16	Torpedo Moscow	9,353	13,1%	38,000
