= Football at the 1987 Summer Universiade =

Football was contested for men only at the 1987 Summer Universiade in Zagreb, Yugoslavia. The tournament was won by the Soviet Union, which sent a team composed entirely of players from FK Žalgiris football club.

Event	Gold	Silver	Bronze
Men's football	Soviet Union (URS)	South Korea (KOR)	North Korea (PRK)
Players	Almantas Kalinauskas; Alvydas Koncevičius; Vyacheslav Sukristov; Virginijus Baltušnikas; Viktoras Bridaitis; Romas Mažeikis; Arvydas Janonis; Vladimiras Buzmakovas; Vidmantas Rasiūkas; Arminas Narbekovas; Robertas Tautkus; Valdas Ivanauskas; Kęstutis Ruzgys; Stasys Baranauskas; Igoris Pankratjevas; Gintaras Kviliūnas		
Managers	Benjaminas Zelkevičius		
