= 1994 FIFA World Cup qualification – UEFA Group 3 =

International football competition

The qualification matches for Group 3 of the European zone (UEFA) of the 1994 FIFA World Cup qualification tournament took place between April 1992 and November 1993. The teams competed on a home-and-away basis with the winner and runner-up claiming 2 of the 12 spots in the final tournament allocated to the European zone. The group consisted of Albania, Denmark, Latvia, Lithuania, Northern Ireland, the Republic of Ireland and Spain.

One of the most notable topics of the group was the Republic of Ireland and Northern Ireland being in the same group ('The Troubles' were still ongoing). The Republic would clinch qualification in the final round of games by drawing away to their northern rivals, while Spain's 1–0 win over Denmark meant they qualified as winners.

== Standings ==
Pos	Team	Pld	W	D	L	GF	GA	GD	Pts	Qualification	Spain national football team	Republic of Ireland national football team	Denmark national football team	Northern Ireland national football team	Lithuania national football team	Latvia national football team	Albania national football team
1	Spain	12	8	3	1	27	4	+23	19	Qualification to 1994 FIFA World Cup	—	0–0	1–0	3–1	5–0	5–0	3–0
2	Republic of Ireland	12	7	4	1	19	6	+13	18	Qualification to 1994 FIFA World Cup	1–3	—	1–1	3–0	2–0	4–0	2–0
3	Denmark	12	7	4	1	15	2	+13	18		1–0	0–0	—	1–0	4–0	2–0	4–0
4	Northern Ireland	12	5	3	4	14	13	+1	13		0–0	1–1	0–1	—	2–2	2–0	3–0
5	Lithuania	12	2	3	7	8	21	−13	7		0–2	0–1	0–0	0–1	—	1–1	3–1
6	Latvia	12	0	5	7	4	21	−17	5		0–0	0–2	0–0	1–2	1–2	—	0–0
7	Albania	12	1	2	9	6	26	−20	4		1–5	1–2	0–1	1–2	1–0	1–1	—

=== Results ===
22 April 1992

Spain	3–0	Albania
Míchel 2', 66' (pen.); Hierro 87'	Report

Benito Villamarín, Seville
Attendance: 10,000
Referee: Serge Muhmenthaler (Switzerland)
28 April 1992

Northern Ireland	2–2	Lithuania
Wilson 13'; Taggart 16'	Report	Narbekovas 41'; Fridrikas 48'

Windsor Park, Belfast
Attendance: 4,500
Referee: Rune Pedersen (Norway)

26 May 1992

Republic of Ireland	2–0	Albania
Aldridge 60'; McGrath 80'	Report

Lansdowne Road, Dublin
Attendance: 29,727
Referee: Jaap Uilenberg (Netherlands)

3 June 1992

Albania	1–0	Lithuania
Abazi 77'	Report

Stadiumi Qemal Stafa, Tirana
Attendance: 12,000
Referee: Octavian Streng (Romania)

12 August 1992

Latvia	1–2	Lithuania
Linards 15'	Report	Poderis 66'; Tereškinas 85'

Daugava Stadium, Riga
Attendance: 6,897
Referee: Jozef Marko (Czechoslovakia)

26 August 1992

Latvia	0–0	Denmark
	Report

Daugava Stadium, Riga
Attendance: 8,124
Referee: Alfred Wieser (Austria)

9 September 1992

Republic of Ireland	4–0	Latvia
Sheedy 30'; Aldridge 59', 82' (pen.), 86'	Report

Lansdowne Road, Dublin
Attendance: 32,000
Referee: Anders Frisk (Sweden)
9 September 1992

Northern Ireland	3–0	Albania
Clarke 14'; Wilson 31'; Magilton 44'	Report

Windsor Park, Belfast
Attendance: 4,756
Referee: Marnix Sandra (Belgium)

23 September 1992

Latvia	0–0	Spain
	Report

Daugava Stadium, Riga
Attendance: 6,220
Referee: Roger Philippi (Luxembourg)
23 September 1992

Lithuania	0–0	Denmark
	Report

Žalgiris Stadium, Vilnius
Attendance: 10,500
Referee: Lube Spasov (Bulgaria)

14 October 1992

Denmark	0–0	Republic of Ireland
	Report

Parken, Copenhagen
Attendance: 40,100
Referee: Ryszard Wójcik (Poland)
14 October 1992

Northern Ireland	0–0	Spain
	Report

Windsor Park, Belfast
Attendance: 10,343
Referee: Hellmut Krug (Germany)

28 October 1992

Lithuania	1–1	Latvia
Fridrikas 85'	Report	Linards 44'

Žalgiris Stadium, Vilnius
Attendance: 4,000
Referee: Andrew Waddell (Scotland)

11 November 1992

Albania	1–1	Latvia
Kepa 67'	Report	Aleksejenko 3'

Qemal Stafa Stadium, Tirana
Attendance: 3,500
Referee: Gerhard Kapl (Austria)
18 November 1992

Northern Ireland	0–1	Denmark
	Report	H. Larsen 51'

Windsor Park, Belfast
Attendance: 11,000
Referee: Sándor Puhl (Hungary)
18 November 1992

Spain	0–0	Republic of Ireland
	Report

Ramón Sánchez-Pizjuán, Seville
Attendance: 50,000
Referee: Alphonse Constantin (Belgium)

16 December 1992

Spain	5–0	Latvia
Bakero 49'; Guardiola 51'; Alfonso 80'; Begiristain 82', 83'	Report

Ramón Sánchez-Pizjuán, Seville
Attendance: 19,000
Referee: Ion Crăciunescu (Romania)

17 February 1993

Albania	1–2	Northern Ireland
Rraklli 90'	Report	Donaghy 15'; McDonald 41'

Qemal Stafa Stadium, Tirana
Attendance: 7,000
Referee: Vesselin Bogdanov (Bulgaria)

24 February 1993

Spain	5–0	Lithuania
Cristóbal 5'; Bakero 12'; Begiristain 17'; Christiansen 86'; Aldana 90'	Report

Benito Villamarín, Seville
Attendance: 20,000
Referee: Alfred Micallef (Malta)

31 March 1993

Denmark	1–0	Spain
Povlsen 20'	Report

Parken, Copenhagen
Attendance: 40,272
Referee: Mario van der Ende (Netherlands)
31 March 1993

Republic of Ireland	3–0	Northern Ireland
Townsend 20'; Quinn 22'; Staunton 28'	Report

Lansdowne Road, Dublin
Attendance: 33,000
Referee: Kurt Röthlisberger (Switzerland)

14 April 1993

Denmark	2–0	Latvia
Vilfort 23'; Strudal 76'	Report

Parken, Copenhagen
Attendance: 29,000
Referee: Rune Pedersen (Norway)
14 April 1993

Lithuania	3–1	Albania
Baltušnikas 20'; Sukristovas 25'; Baranauskas 63'	Report	Demollari 86'

Žalgiris Stadium, Vilnius
Attendance: 7,000
Referee: Eyjólfur Olafsson (Iceland)

28 April 1993

Republic of Ireland	1–1	Denmark
Quinn 75'	Report	Vilfort 27'

Lansdowne Road, Dublin
Attendance: 33,000
Referee: Rémi Harrel (France)
28 April 1993

Spain	3–1	Northern Ireland
J. Salinas 21', 26'; Hierro 41'	Report	Wilson 11'

Benito Villamarín, Seville
Attendance: 20,000
Referee: Leif Sundell (Sweden)

15 May 1993

Latvia	0–0	Albania
	Report

Daugava Stadium, Riga
Attendance: 3,100
Referee: Alan Howells (Wales)

25 May 1993

Lithuania	0–1	Northern Ireland
	Report	Dowie 8'

Žalgiris Stadium, Vilnius
Attendance: 6,500
Referee: Esa Palsi (Finland)
26 May 1993

Albania	1–2	Republic of Ireland
Kushta 8'	Report	Staunton 12'; Cascarino 77'

Qemal Stafa Stadium, Tirana
Attendance: 7,000
Referee: Walter Cinciripini (Italy)

2 June 1993

Denmark	4–0	Albania
J. Jensen 11'; Pingel 20', 40'; Møller 28'	Report

Parken, Copenhagen
Attendance: 39,503
Referee: Gerd Grabher (Austria)
2 June 1993

Latvia	1–2	Northern Ireland
Linards 55'	Report	Magilton 4'; Taggart 15'

Daugava Stadium, Riga
Attendance: 2,764
Referee: Piotr Werner (Poland)
2 June 1993

Lithuania	0–2	Spain
	Report	Guerrero 73', 77'

Žalgiris Stadium, Vilnius
Attendance: 4,500
Referee: Gheorghe Ionescu (Romania)

9 June 1993

Latvia	0–2	Republic of Ireland
	Report	Aldridge 14'; McGrath 42'

Daugava Stadium, Riga
Attendance: 5,113
Referee: Dick Jol (Netherlands)

16 June 1993

Lithuania	0–1	Republic of Ireland
	Report	Staunton 38'

Žalgiris Stadium, Vilnius
Attendance: 7,000
Referee: Roger Philippi (Luxembourg)

25 August 1993

Denmark	4–0	Lithuania
L. Olsen 13'; Pingel 44'; B. Laudrup 64'; Vilfort 71'	Report

Parken, Copenhagen
Attendance: 40,282
Referee: Brági Bergmann (Iceland)

8 September 1993

Albania	0–1	Denmark
	Report	Pingel 63'

Qemal Stafa Stadium, Tirana
Attendance: 8,000
Referee: Loizos Loizou (Cyprus)
8 September 1993

Republic of Ireland	2–0	Lithuania
Aldridge 4'; Kernaghan 25'	Report

Lansdowne Road, Dublin
Attendance: 33,000
Referee: Rune Pedersen (Norway)
8 September 1993

Northern Ireland	2–0	Latvia
Quinn 35'; Gray 80'	Report

Windsor Park, Belfast
Attendance: 6,400
Referee: João Pinto Correia (Portugal)

22 September 1993

Albania	1–5	Spain
Kushta 40'	Report	J. Salinas 4', 30', 58'; Toni 18'; Caminero 67'

Qemal Stafa Stadium, Tirana
Attendance: 3,000
Referee: Rémi Harrel (France)

13 October 1993

Denmark	1–0	Northern Ireland
B. Laudrup 83'	Report

Parken, Copenhagen
Attendance: 40,242
Referee: Vadim Zhuk (Belarus)
13 October 1993

Republic of Ireland	1–3	Spain
Sheridan 72'	Report	Caminero 11'; J. Salinas 14', 26'

Lansdowne Road, Dublin
Attendance: 33,000
Referee: Fabio Baldas (Italy)

17 November 1993

Northern Ireland	1–1	Republic of Ireland
Quinn 74'	Report	McLoughlin 78'

Windsor Park, Belfast
Attendance: 10,500
Referee: Ahmet Çakar (Turkey)
17 November 1993

Spain	1–0	Denmark
Hierro 63'	Report

Ramón Sánchez-Pizjuán, Seville
Attendance: 38,000
Referee: Vassilios Nikakis (Greece)

== Goalscorers ==
7 goals

- (Spain) Julio Salinas

6 goals

- (Republic of Ireland) John Aldridge

4 goals

- (Denmark) Frank Pingel

3 goals

- (Denmark) Kim Vilfort
- (Republic of Ireland) Steve Staunton
- (Latvia) Ainārs Linards
- (Northern Ireland) Kevin Wilson
- (Spain) Txiki Begiristain
- (Spain) Fernando Hierro

2 goals

- (Albania) Sokol Kushta
- (Denmark) Brian Laudrup
- (Republic of Ireland) Paul McGrath
- (Republic of Ireland) Niall Quinn
- (Lithuania) Robertas Fridrikas
- (Northern Ireland) Jim Magilton
- (Northern Ireland) Jimmy Quinn
- (Northern Ireland) Gerry Taggart
- (Spain) José Mari Bakero
- (Spain) José Luis Caminero
- (Spain) Julen Guerrero
- (Spain) Míchel

1 goal

- (Albania) Edmond Abazi
- (Albania) Sulejman Demollari
- (Albania) Ilir Kepa
- (Albania) Altin Rraklli
- (Denmark) John Jensen
- (Denmark) Henrik Larsen
- (Denmark) Peter Møller
- (Denmark) Lars Olsen
- (Denmark) Flemming Povlsen
- (Denmark) Mark Strudal
- (Republic of Ireland) Tony Cascarino
- (Republic of Ireland) Alan Kernaghan
- (Republic of Ireland) Alan McLoughlin
- (Republic of Ireland) Kevin Sheedy
- (Republic of Ireland) John Sheridan
- (Republic of Ireland) Andy Townsend
- (Latvia) Oļegs Aleksejenko
- (Lithuania) Virginijus Baltušnikas
- (Lithuania) Stasys Baranauskas
- (Lithuania) Arminas Narbekovas
- (Lithuania) Eimantas Poderis
- (Lithuania) Viačeslavas Sukristovas
- (Lithuania) Andrėjus Tereškinas
- (Northern Ireland) Colin Clarke
- (Northern Ireland) Mal Donaghy
- (Northern Ireland) Iain Dowie
- (Northern Ireland) Phil Gray
- (Northern Ireland) Alan McDonald
- (Spain) Adolfo Aldana
- (Spain) Thomas Christiansen
- (Spain) Pep Guardiola
- (Spain) Cristóbal Parralo
- (Spain) Alfonso Pérez
- (Spain) Toni
