= Algimantas Liubinskas =

Lithuanian football manager (born 1951)

Personal information
- Date of birth: 4 November 1951 (age 74)
- Place of birth: Kybartai, Lithuanian SSR, Soviet Union
- Height: 1.83 m (6 ft 0 in)
- Position: Defender

Senior career*
Years	Team	Apps	(Gls)
1973–1976	Žalgiris		

Managerial career
- 1983–1985: Žalgiris
- 1988: Abahani Limited Dhaka
- 1991–1995: Lithuania
- 1995–1997: Kareda Šiauliai
- 1997–1998: Panerys Vilnius
- 1998: Jagiellonia Białystok
- 2002–2003: Lithuania U21
- 2003–2008: Lithuania
- 2010: Lviv
- 2011–2012: Kaisar
- 2014: Santos Tartu
- 2015–2020: Vilniaus Vytis
- * Club domestic league appearances and goals

Algimantas Liubinskas (born 4 November 1951) is Lithuanian professional football manager and former player. He was in charge of the Lithuania national team twice, from 1991 to 1995 and from 2003 to 2008.

== Career ==
Prior to his coaching career, Liubinskas played 62 games for Soviet Top League club Žalgiris from 1973 until 1974.

At 31 years old, Liubinskas became the youngest ever coach of Žalgiris, which he coached from April 1983 to April 1985.

In 1991, Liubinskas was named the head coach of the Lithuania national team, restored after independence. Despite wins against Slovenia and Ukraine in 1994 FIFA World Cup qualifiers, Liubinskas was fired in 1995 after an argument with the Lithuanian Football Federation. His next job saw him move back into club football as he won the 1996–97 Lithuanian title with Kareda Šiauliai, but subsequent spells at Panerys Vilnius and Polish side Jagiellonia Bialystok were less successful. He returned to coaching in 2002, as the Lithuania U21 coach, and was handed the senior team job the following year. In this position, he replaced Benjaminas Zelkevičius, who had been Liubinskas' replacement in 1995. Liubinskas lasted five years as head manager before he resigned in 2008. Famous results during his second tenure include a 1–1 draw against Germany in Nuremberg, a 1–0 victory over Scotland in Kaunas, and a 1–1 draw in Naples against Italy. All three fixtures occurred during European Championship qualifiers.

In December 2009, Liubinskas signed a deal to coach with FC Lviv in Ukrainian First League for the remainder of the 2009–10 season, but on 19 April 2010 he was sacked.

== Politics ==
On 4 August 2008, Liubinskas quit his role as national team coach in order concentrate on campaigning for a seat in the Seimas as a member of the Order and Justice party.

== Honours ==
Lithuania

- Baltic Cup: 2005
