= Lee Kwang-jong =

South Korean footballer and coach

Personal information
- Date of birth: 1 April 1964
- Place of birth: Gimpo, South Korea
- Date of death: 26 September 2016 (aged 52)
- Place of death: Seoul, South Korea
- Height: 1.77 m (5 ft 10 in)
- Position: Midfielder

College career
Years	Team	Apps	(Gls)
1984–1987	Chung-Ang University		

Senior career*
Years	Team	Apps	(Gls)
1988–1995	Yukong Elephants	196	(26)
1996–1997	Suwon Samsung Bluewings	38	(6)
Total		234	(32)

International career
1985–1987	South Korea B		

Managerial career
- 2003: South Korea U17 (caretaker)
- 2004–2005: South Korea U20 (assistant)
- 2007–2009: South Korea U17
- 2010–2013: South Korea U20
- 2013–2015: South Korea U23
Medal record
Men's football
Representing South Korea (as player)
Summer Universiade
Silver medal – second place	1987 Zagreb
Representing South Korea (as manager)
Asian Games
Gold medal – first place	2014 Incheon
AFC U-19 Championship
Winner	2012 United Arab Emirates
AFC U-16 Championship
Runner-up	2008 Uzbekistan
- * Club domestic league appearances and goals

Lee Kwang-jong (Korean: 이광종, 1 April 1964 – 26 September 2016) was a South Korean football player and manager.

== Managerial career ==
=== Early career ===
Lee was temporarily appointed manager of the South Korea national under-17 team during the 2004 AFC U-17 Championship qualification in October 2003. He became an assistant coach of the national under-20 team the next year, and participated in the 2004 AFC Youth Championship and the 2005 FIFA World Youth Championship.

=== South Korea U17 ===
Lee was appointed permanent manager of the national under-17s in October 2007, and qualified for the 2009 FIFA U-17 World Cup by leading his team to a runner-up finish at the 2008 AFC U-16 Championship. Under him, South Korea reached the quarter-finals at the U-17 World Cup for the first time in 22 years since 1987.

=== South Korea U20 ===
Lee moved to the under-20 team the next year. He could not call up three forwards playing at Big Five leagues, namely Son Heung-min, Ji Dong-won and Nam Tae-hee, for the 2011 FIFA U-20 World Cup due to their clubs' disallowance. His team earned three points in three group stage matches, narrowly avoiding early elimination. They lost 7–6 on penalties to Spain after a goalless draw in the round of 16.

Lee managed the next generation at the under-20 team after the 2011 U-20 World Cup. The new players were called the "Valley Generation", which meant the weakest generation, in South Korea, but unexpectedly won the 2012 AFC U-19 Championship under him. There were no key players among them, but their teamwork also led them to the quarter-finals at the 2013 FIFA U-20 World Cup.

=== South Korea U23 ===
Lee was promoted to under-23 team manager in November 2013. The players showed weaknesses in frontline movements and set pieces while playing at the 2013 AFC U-22 Championship, and so he called up overage target forward Kim Shin-wook to remedy the defective offense prior to the 2014 Asian Games. However, Kim was injured in the second group stage match, and Lee had to change his plan. His team constructed a strong defense around captain Jang Hyun-soo, and brought a gold medal after winning all seven matches without conceding a goal. The Korea Football Association extended the contract with him until the end of the 2016 Summer Olympics.

In February 2015, Lee suffered from an acute leukemia, resigning from his post. On 26 September 2016, he died at the age of 52.

== Honours ==
=== Player ===
Yukong Elephants

- K League 1: 1989
- Korean League Cup: 1994

South Korea B

- Summer Universiade silver medal: 1987

=== Manager ===
South Korea U17

- AFC U-16 Championship runner-up: 2008

South Korea U20

- AFC U-19 Championship: 2012

South Korea U23

- Asian Games: 2014
