= Artūras Jeršovas =

Lithuanian footballer

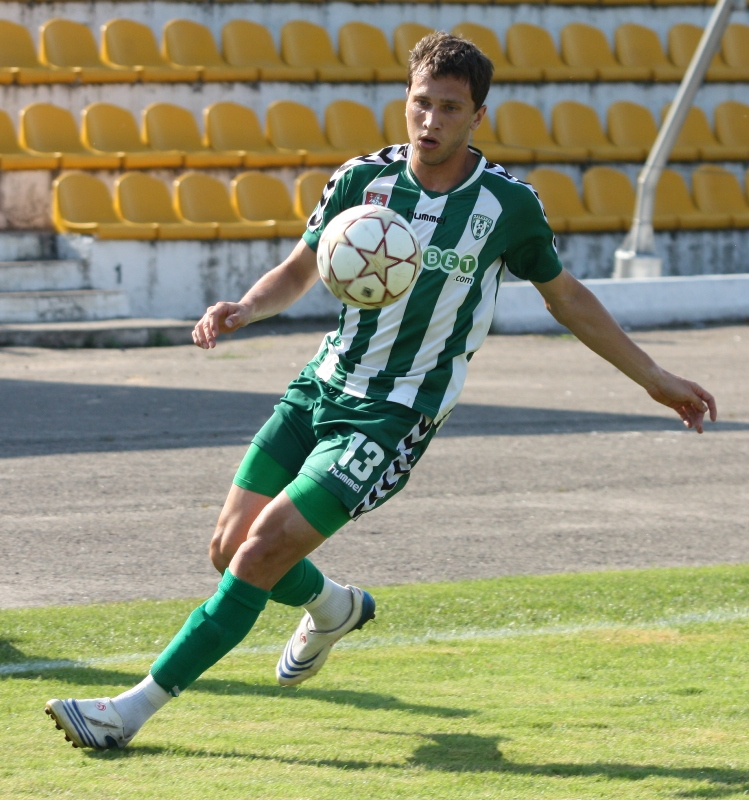
- Artūras Jeršovas playing for Žalgiris Vilnius

Personal information
- Date of birth: 10 July 1986 (age 40)
- Height: 1.80 m (5 ft 11 in)
- Position: Forward

Senior career*
Years	Team	Apps	(Gls)
2004–2006	FC Vilnius		
2007	Interas-AE Visaginas		
2008	FBK Kaunas		
2008–2009	FK Šilutė		
2010–2012	FK Žalgiris		
2012	FK Šiauliai		

International career
- Lithuania U21
2010	Lithuania	1	(0)
- * Club domestic league appearances and goals

Artūras Jeršovas (born 10 July 1986) is a retired Lithuanian football striker.
