= Jakubauskas =

Jakubauskas is a Lithuanian surname. Notable people with the surname include:

- Chris Jakubauskas (born 1978), American baseball player
- Feliksas Jakubauskas (1949–2025), Lithuanian textile artist
- Sigitas Jakubauskas (born 1958), Soviet Lithuanian footballer
