= Arnas Voitinovičius =

Lithuanian footballer (born 2006)

Personal information
- Date of birth: 30 August 2006 (age 20)
- Place of birth: Lithuania
- Height: 1.89 m (6 ft 2 in)
- Position: Goalkeeper

Team information
- Current team: Benfica
- Number: 51

Youth career
- Riteriai
- 2024–: Benfica

Senior career*
| Years | Team | Apps | (Gls) |
| –2023 | Riteriai B | | |
| 2023 | Riteriai | 4 | (0) |
| 2025– | Benfica B | 5 | (0) |
| 2026– | Benfica | 0 | (0) |

International career^{‡}
| 2023–2024 | Lithuania U19 | 13 | (0) |
| 2025– | Lithuania U21 | 2 | (0) |
| 2026– | Lithuania | 1 | (0) |
- * Club domestic league appearances and goals as of 7 May 2026 ‡ National team caps and goals as of 18 November 2026

Arnas Voitinovičius (born 30 August 2006) is a Lithuanian professional footballer who plays as a goalkeeper for Benfica and the Lithuania national team.

== Club career ==
As a youth player, Voitinovičius joined the youth academy of Lithuanian side Riteriai and was promoted to the club's senior team ahead of the 2023 season, where he made four league appearances and scored zero goals. On 23 July 2023, he debuted for the club during a 2–2 home draw with Džiugas in the league. Following his stint there, he joined the youth academy of Portuguese side Benfica in 2024 and was promoted to the club's senior team in 2026.

== International career ==
Voitinovičius is a Lithuania youth international. Portuguese newspaper Record wrote in 2026 that he was "one of the most promising [Lithuanian] young players". During the spring of 2026, he played for the Lithuania national under-21 football team for 2027 UEFA European Under-21 Championship qualification.

== Career statistics ==
=== International ===
As of match played 16 November 2026

Appearances and goals by national team and year
| National team | Year | Apps | Goals |
|---|---|---|---|
| Lithuania | 2026 | 1 | 0 |
| Total | | 1 | 0 |
