= Donatas Vencevičius =

Lithuanian footballer and manager

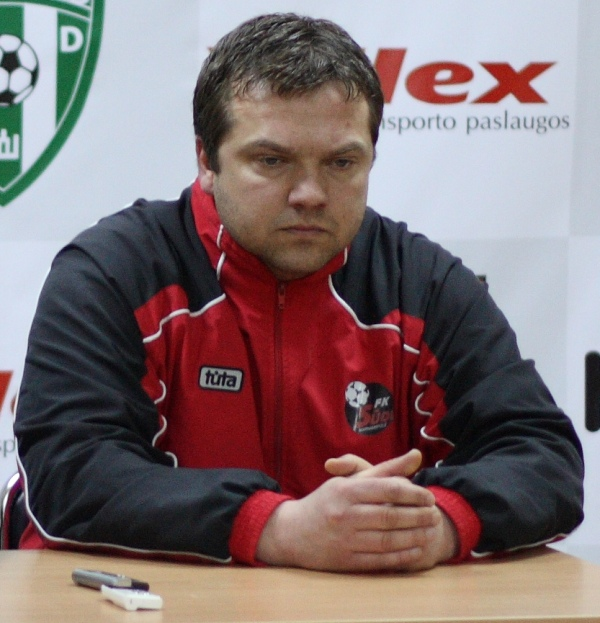
- Vencevičius as Sūduva manager in 2010

Personal information
- Full name: Donatas Vencevičius
- Date of birth: 28 November 1973 (age 52)
- Place of birth: Alytus, Lithuanian SSR, Soviet Union
- Position: Midfielder

Team information
- Current team: Sūduva (manager)

Senior career*
Years	Team	Apps	(Gls)
1991–1996	Žalgiris Vilnius	121	(31)
1997–1999	Polonia Warsaw	33	(2)
2000–2002	FC København	46	(2)
2002	IK Start	24	(1)
2003	Sviesa Vilnius	17	(3)
2003–2004	Marsaxlokk	24	(0)
2004	Vilnius	10	(2)
2005	GIF Sundsvall	13	(0)
2006	Vėtra	17	(0)

International career
1995–2005	Lithuania	33	(2)

Managerial career
- 2007: Vėtra (assistant)
- 2007–2008: Vėtra
- 2008: Sūduva (assistant)
- 2009: OKS 1945 Olsztyn (caretaker)
- 2010–2011: Sūduva
- 2011–2014: Wigry Suwałki
- 2014–2015: Wigry Suwałki (assistant)
- 2015–2016: Wigry Suwałki
- 2016–2017: Jonava
- 2018: DFK Dainava
- 2018–2022: Wigry Suwałki (assistant)
- 2019–2020: Lithuania U21
- 2020: Wigry Suwałki (caretaker)
- 2021: Wigry Suwałki (caretaker)
- 2021: Wigry Suwałki (caretaker)
- 2022–2023: Miedź Legnica (assistant)
- 2023: Podbeskidzie (assistant)
- 2024: TransINVEST
- 2025–: Sūduva
- * Club domestic league appearances and goals

Donatas Vencevičius (born 28 November 1973) is a Lithuanian professional football manager and former player who played as a midfielder. He is currently in charge of TOPLYGA club Sūduva.

Vencevičius started his career at Žalgiris Vilnius. In 2001, while playing for FC København, he became champion of the Danish Superliga. In 2002, he played for the Norwegian club IK Start. Donatas also made a mediocre stay in the Swedish club GIF Sundsvall during the season 2005.

He started his managerial career in 2007 after announcing his retirement from professional football as a player and was first assistant, then head coach of FK Vėtra for one season before moving to FK Sūduva in 2009 to take up an assistant coach position. Before the 2010 season, Sūduva appointed Vencevičius as the head coach.

On 24 May 2011, he was named new manager of II liga club Wigry Suwałki.

On 14 December 2016, he signed a two-year contract with Lithuanian A Lyga club Jonava.

== Career statistics ==
=== International ===
Appearances and goals by national team and year
National team	Year	Apps	Goals
Lithuania
Lithuania	1995	6	0
Lithuania	1996	2	0
Lithuania	1997	1	0
Lithuania	1998	2	0
Lithuania	1999	3	0
Lithuania	2000	6	0
Lithuania	2001	2	0
Lithuania	2003	3	1
Lithuania	2004	7	1
Lithuania	2005	1	0
Total		33	2

Scores and results list Lithuania's goal tally first, score column indicates score after each Vencevičius goal.

List of international goals scored by Donatas Vencevičius
No.	Date	Venue	Opponent	Score	Result	Competition
1	10 September 2003	Svangaskarð, Toftir, Faroe Islands	Faroe Islands	2–0	3–1	UEFA Euro 2004 qualifying
2	5 June 2004	Estádio do Bonfim, Setúbal, Portugal	Portugal	1–2	1–4	Friendly

== Honours ==
Žalgiris Vilnius

- A Lyga: 1991–92
- Lithuanian Cup: 1991, 1992–93, 1993–94, 1996–97

Polonia Warsaw

- Ekstraklasa: 1999–2000

Copenhagen

- Superliga: 2000–01
- Danish Super Cup: 2001
