= 2004 Lithuanian football leagues =

LFF Lyga
- Season: 2004

Final tables of the Lithuanian Championship in 2004 are presented below. The Lithuanian Football Federation (LFF) organized three football leagues: A Lyga (the highest), 1 Lyga (second-tier), and 2 Lyga (third-tier), which comprised four regional zones.

== A Lyga ==
Pos	Team	Pld	W	D	L	GF	GA	GD	Pts	Qualification
1	FBK Kaunas (C)	28	20	5	3	49	19	+30	65	Qualification to Champions League first qualifying round
2	Ekranas	28	20	2	6	59	22	+37	62	Qualification to UEFA Cup first qualifying round
3	Atlantas	28	15	5	8	36	29	+7	50	Qualification to UEFA Cup first qualifying round
4	Žalgiris	28	10	7	11	32	38	−6	37	Qualification to Intertoto Cup first round
5	Vėtra	28	9	8	11	29	33	−4	35	Qualification to Intertoto Cup first round
6	Šilutė	28	6	7	15	34	44	−10	25	
7	Sūduva	28	5	7	16	31	55	−24	22	
8	Vilnius	28	4	5	19	19	49	−30	17	

Source: RSSSF.com
(C) Champions

== 1 Lyga ==
Pos	Team	Pld	W	D	L	GF	GA	GD	Pts
1	KFK Šiauliai	32	22	5	5	81	21	+60	71
2	Kauno Jėgeriai	32	21	7	4	73	26	+47	70
3	Nevėžis Kėdainiai	32	19	7	6	62	31	+31	64
4	Geležinis Vilkas Vilnius	32	17	7	8	61	37	+24	58
5	Polonija Vilnius	32	17	3	12	53	34	+19	54
6	FK Mažeikiai	32	15	4	13	54	51	+3	49
7	Lietava Jonava	32	13	7	12	45	54	−9	46
8	Babrungas Plungė	32	13	6	13	55	47	+8	45
9	Rodovitas Klaipėda	32	12	8	12	55	60	−5	44
10	Vėtra-2 Vilnius	32	12	6	14	59	62	−3	42
11	Ekranas-2 Panevėžys	32	10	7	15	45	48	−3	37
12	LKKA Kaunas	32	9	8	15	44	68	−24	35
13	Utenis Utena	32	10	4	18	29	66	−37	34
14	Alytis Alytus	32	8	10	14	24	42	−18	34
15	Atletas Kaunas	32	8	9	15	25	44	−19	33
16	Tauras Tauragė	32	9	2	21	29	73	−44	29
17	FK Vilnius-2	32	4	6	22	26	56	−30	18

== 2 Lyga ==
=== 2 Lyga zone East ===
Pos	Team	Pld	W	D	L	GF	GA	GD	Pts
1	Lietuvos Paštas Vilnius	27	24	0	3	117	22	+95	72
2	Gariūnai Vilnius	27	22	3	2	98	17	+81	69
3	Vilniaus Polonija	27	22	2	3	99	25	+74	68
4	Sostinės Svajotojas Vilnius	27	21	2	4	103	24	+79	65
5	Kaitra Lentvaris	27	15	3	9	62	33	+29	48
6	Granitas Naujoji Vilnia	27	12	7	8	57	36	+21	43
7	Orbit Vilnius	27	12	2	13	55	53	+2	38
8	Aktas Vilnius	27	11	3	13	57	57	0	36
9	Sostinės Policija Vilnius	27	7	5	15	40	94	−54	26
10	Troleibusas Vilnius	27	7	4	16	46	86	−40	25
11	Širvinta Širvintos	27	7	1	19	38	113	−75	22
12	Ozas Vilnius	27	4	6	17	25	79	−54	18
13	Naujieji Verkiai Vilnius	27	4	4	19	42	113	−71	16
14	Žeimena Pabradė	27	4	0	23	21	91	−70	12
15	Prelegentai Vilnius	14	2	2	10	18	34	−16	8
16	Vienybė HBH Ukmergė	0	0	0	0	0	0	0	0

=== 2 Lyga zone South ===
Pos	Team	Pld	W	D	L	GF	GA	GD	Pts
1	Sūduva-2 Marijampolė	26	17	5	4	84	22	+62	56
2	Interas-AE Visaginas	26	17	4	5	65	24	+41	55
3	FM Kvintencija Kaunas	26	16	6	4	57	26	+31	54
4	SM Alytis-2 Alytus	26	15	7	4	55	28	+27	52
5	Sveikata Kybartai	26	14	3	9	47	34	+13	45
6	Rodiklis Kaunas	26	14	3	9	76	41	+35	45
7	Alytus SM	26	14	3	9	58	43	+15	45
8	Nevėžis-2 Kėdainiai	26	12	5	9	61	50	+11	41
9	SC Savingė Kaisiadorys	26	9	7	10	44	53	−9	34
10	Neris Karmėlava	26	9	5	12	45	50	−5	32
11	FK Kalvarija	26	6	0	20	35	70	−35	18
12	FK Anykščiai	26	5	2	19	19	71	−52	17
13	Valdima SC Prienai	26	3	4	19	28	82	−54	13
14	SC Šilas Kazlų Rūda	26	4	0	22	28	109	−81	12

=== 2 Lyga zone West ===
Pos	Team	Pld	W	D	L	GF	GA	GD	Pts
1	FK Šilutė-2	16	13	0	3	68	16	+52	39
2	Kuršiai Neringa	16	12	2	2	57	26	+31	38
3	Banga Gargždai	16	10	3	3	57	28	+29	33
4	Atlantas-2 Klaipėda	16	7	4	5	54	21	+33	25
5	Titanikas Klaipėda	16	6	4	6	36	38	−2	22
6	Sakuona Plikiai	16	5	2	9	45	48	−3	17
7	Minija Kretinga	16	4	1	11	19	70	−51	13
8	FK Pagėgiai	16	3	1	12	30	76	−46	10
9	Salantas Salantai	16	2	3	11	18	61	−43	9

=== 2 Lyga zone North ===
Pos	Team	Pld	W	D	L	GF	GA	GD	Pts
1	Kruoja Pakruojis	18	12	5	1	59	15	+44	41
2	Kražantė Kelmė	18	12	4	2	57	26	+31	40
3	Venta Kuršėnai	18	9	7	2	40	12	+28	34
4	Juventa-99 Šiauliai	18	9	3	6	50	36	+14	30
5	Mastis Telšiai	18	7	5	6	35	31	+4	26
6	KFK Šiauliai-2	18	7	4	7	31	29	+2	25
7	Rinkuškiai Biržai	18	7	3	8	40	43	−3	24
8	Babrungas-2 Plungė	18	3	3	12	28	53	−25	12
9	FK Pasvalys	18	4	0	14	23	76	−53	12
10	SC Akmenė	18	2	2	14	22	64	−42	8
