= Kęstutis Latoža =

Lithuanian football manager

Kęstutis Latoža (born 2 August 1950) is a Lithuanian football manager.

== Career ==
Latoža played club football for FK Žalgiris Vilnius from 1968 to 1983.

After representing the Lithuanian SSR team 76 times as a player, he retired and began a career in coaching. He has also played 515 matches, scored 50 goals. His notable appointments were as Head Coach of the Lithuania national football team and as a club manager in the Faroe Islands, . He later managed FK Žalgiris Vilnius of Lithuania, made them to champions of Lithuania. but left in 2006. He was rewarded for his achievements with Comodor Cross, later rewarded by Vilnius sport departament and more.
