= Vyacheslav Sukristov =

Lithuanian footballer (born 1961)

Viačeslavas Sukristovas Вячеслав Васильевич Сукристов
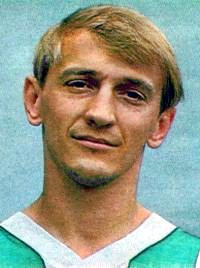

Personal information
- Full name: Viačeslavas Vasilyevich Sukristovas
- Date of birth: 1 January 1961 (age 65)
- Place of birth: Vilnius, Lithuanian SSR, Soviet Union
- Height: 1.82 m (6 ft 0 in)
- Positions: Defender; midfielder

Senior career*
Years	Team	Apps	(Gls)
1984–1990	Žalgiris Vilnius	139	(20)
1990	Lokomotiv Moscow	13	(1)
1990–1992	Beitar Tel Aviv	39	(8)
1992–1993	Maccabi Netanya	23	(2)
1993–1994	Maccabi Herzliya	36	(4)
1994–1995	Hapoel Ramat Gan	30	(4)
1995–1996	Hapoel Haifa	15	(2)
1996–1997	Bnei Yehuda Tel Aviv	10	(0)
1997–1998	Žalgiris Vilnius	26	(3)

International career
1988	USSR	4	(0)
1990–1997	Lithuania	26	(2)

Managerial career
- Polonija Vilnius
- 2005: Žalgiris Vilnius
- 2006: Žalgiris Vilnius (assistant)
- 2006–2007: Lithuania U-21 (assistant)
- 2008–2010: Žalgiris Vilnius (assistant)
- 2012: REO (assistant)
- * Club domestic league appearances and goals

Viačeslavas Vasilyevich Sukristovas (Russian: Вячеслав Васильевич Сукристов; Lithuanian: Viačeslavas Sukristovas; born 1 January 1961 in Vilnius) is a former Soviet and Lithuanian association football player and manager.

== International career ==
Sukristovas made his debut for USSR on 23 March 1988 in a friendly against Greece. He was selected for the UEFA Euro 1988 squad, but did not play in any games at the tournament. He later played for Lithuania.

== International goals ==
Scores and results list Lithuania's goal tally first.

No	Date	Venue	Opponent	Score	Result	Competition
1.	14 April 1993	Žalgiris Stadium, Vilnius, Lithuania	Albania	2–0	3–1	1994 World Cup qualifier
2.	16 November 1994	Ljudski vrt, Maribor, Slovenia	Slovenia	1–1	2–1	Euro 1996 qualifier

== Honours ==
- UEFA Euro runner-up: 1988
- Soviet Top League bronze: 1987
- A Lyga bronze: 1990
