= Lithuania national under-21 football team =

National association football team

Lithuania Under-21
- Association: Lietuvos futbolo federacija (LFF)
- Confederation: UEFA (Europe)
- Head coach: (Lithuania) Andrius Skerla
First colours	Second colours

First international
- Austria 1–1 Lithuania (Vienna, Austria; 14 April 1992)

Biggest win
- Estonia 0–5 Lithuania (Pärnu, Estonia; 15 August 1995)

Biggest defeat
- Spain 8–0 Lithuania (Talavera de la Reina, Spain; 25 March 2022)

The Lithuania national under-21 football team is the national under-21 football team of Lithuania and is controlled by the Lithuanian Football Federation.

== UEFA U-21 Championship record ==
- 1978 to 1992 - see Soviet Union

UEFA U-21 Championship record									UEFA U-21 Championship Qualification record						
Year	Round	Pld	W	D	L	GF	GA	GD	Pld	W	D	L	GF	GA	GD
(Spain) 1996	Did not qualify								10	2	2	6	14	16	−2
(Romania) 1998	Did not qualify								8	3	0	5	8	12	−4
(Slovakia) 2000	Did not qualify								10	5	1	4	14	10	+4
(Switzerland) 2002	Did not qualify								8	2	0	6	5	17	−12
(Germany) 2004	Did not qualify								6	3	0	3	10	10	0
(Portugal) 2006	Did not qualify								10	3	1	6	9	16	−7
(Netherlands) 2007	Did not qualify								2	1	0	1	1	2	−1
(Sweden) 2009	Did not qualify								8	0	1	7	2	18	−16
(Denmark) 2011	Did not qualify								8	1	2	5	3	11	−8
(Israel) 2013	Did not qualify								10	3	0	7	9	18	−9
(Czech Republic) 2015	Did not qualify								10	2	2	6	6	19	−13
(Poland) 2017	Did not qualify								10	3	1	6	5	18	−13
(Italy) 2019	Did not qualify								10	2	2	6	7	16	−9
(Hungary) (Slovenia) 2021	Did not qualify								10	3	1	6	9	15	−6
(Romania) (Georgia (country)) 2023	Did not qualify								8	2	1	5	7	22	−15
(Slovakia) 2025	Did not qualify								8	1	0	7	7	16	−9
(Albania) (Serbia) 2027	Did not qualify								8	0	2	6	4	17	-13
Total	0/17								144	36	16	92	120	253	−133

== Recent results ==
Latest results
Date	Venue	Opponent	Result	Competition
2025
18 November 2025	Lithuania	Turkey U-21	1:2	2027 UEFA U-21 Q

2026

27 March 2026 2027 m. UEFA U-21 Qualification	Ukraine	1:1	Lithuania	(Slovakia) Košice, Košická Futbalová Aréna
18:00	Danylo Krevsun 61'	Report	Faustas Steponavičius 70'	Attendance: 850; Referee: Roman Jitari (Moldova)

7 June 2026 2026 U-21 Baltic Cup	Estonia	2:2	Lithuania	(Latvia) Sporta bāze Daugavgrīva, Rīga
18:00	Karel Mustmaa 12', 15'	Report	Sidas Praleika 33'; Jonas Usavičius 83'	Attendance: 88; Referee: Deniss Kozlovs (Latvia)

9 June 2026 2026 U-21 Baltic Cup	Lithuania	2:2	Latvia	(Lithuania) Vytauto stadionas, Tauragė
18:00	Faustas Steponavičius 73' (pen.); Eridanas Bierontas 90+4'	Report	Valerijs Lizunovs 55'; Igors Patrikejevs 90'	Referee: Manfredas Lukjančukas (Lithuania)

1 October 2026 2027 UEFA Euro U21 qualification	Hungary	2:1	Lithuania	(Hungary) Hidegkuti Nándor Stadion, Budapest
19:00	Máté Tuboly 30' (pen.); Csanád Dénes 75'	Report	Dovas Grudzinskas 16'	Attendance: 1113; Referee: Bálint Kiss (Slovakia)

6 October 2026 2027 UEFA Euro U21 qualification	Lithuania	0:1	Croatia	(Lithuania) LSC Druskininkai Stadium, Druskininkai
19:00		Report	Ivan Canjuga 27' (pen.)	Referee: Aaron Wyn Jones (Wales)

== Players ==
=== Current squad ===
The following players were called up for the 2027 UEFA European Under-21 Championship qualification games in October 2026.

Caps and goals updated as of 6 October 2026, after the match against Croatia U-21.

No.	Pos.	Player	Date of birth (age)	Caps	Goals	Club
12	GK	Arnas Voitinovičius	30 August 2006 (age 20)	3	0	(Portuguese Football Federation) S.L. Benfica B
22	GK	Vilius Šivickas	4 July 2005 (age 21)	1	0	(Lithuanian Football Federation) FA Šiauliai
2	DF	Tautvydas Burdzilauskas	18 May 2005 (age 21)	10	0	(Lithuanian Football Federation) FK Kauno Žalgiris
3	DF	Oskar Pukelis	29 February 2008 (age 18)	3	0	(Swedish Football Association) AIK FF
4	DF	Patrik Matyžonok	23 July 2006 (age 20)	11	0	(Lithuanian Football Federation) FK Žalgiris
11	DF	Martynas Šetkus	7 October 2005 (age 21)	11	0	(Lithuanian Football Federation) FK Žalgiris
14	DF	Dovydas Sasnauskas	16 February 2007 (age 19)	2	0	(The Football Association) Sheffield United U21
15	DF	Dovydas Balsys	5 October 2008 (age 18)	2	0	(Lithuanian Football Federation) FK Panevėžys
18	DF	Edgaras Bierontas	3 October 2007 (age 19)	4	1	(Lithuanian Football Federation) FA Šiauliai
5	MF	Sidas Praleika	25 May 2007 (age 19)	5	1	(Football Association of the Czech Republic) MFK Karviná
6	MF	Dovas Grudzinskas	17 September 2008 (age 18)	3	1	(Austrian Football Association) FC Liefering
7	MF	Dominykas Taučas	7 February 2008 (age 18)	4	0	(Royal Spanish Football Federation) Valencia CF
8	MF	Skirmantas Paukštys	6 January 2007 (age 19)	1	0	(Italian Football Federation) S.S. Monopoli 1966
10	MF	Ernestas Gudelevičius	14 January 2005 (age 21)	13	0	(Italian Football Federation) Team Altamura
16	MF	Kajus Bička	29 November 2004 (age 21)	2	0	(Lithuanian Football Federation) FK Žalgiris
17	MF	Grant Emerhi	25 January 2008 (age 18)	2	0	(United States Soccer Federation) UConn Huskies
20	MF	Jonas Usavičius	23 January 2006 (age 20)	5	1	(Lithuanian Football Federation) FK Žalgiris
21	MF	Nikita Pavlovskij	30 August 2006 (age 20)	7	0	(Lithuanian Football Federation) FC Džiugas
9	FW	Romualdas Jansonas	23 June 2005 (age 21)	12	1	(Royal Spanish Football Federation) UD Ourense
19	FW	Vakaris Berenta	14 July 2007 (age 19)	1	0	(Lithuanian Football Federation) FK Žalgiris

== List of managers ==
Name	Nat	From	To
Stasys Danisevičius	(Lithuania)	1994	1995
Stasys Stankus	(Lithuania)	1995	1999
Eugenijus Riabovas	(Lithuania)	2000	2001
Algimantas Liubinskas	(Lithuania)	2002	2002
Virginijus Liubšys	(Lithuania)	2003	2004
Vitalijus Stankevičius	(Lithuania)	2004	2006
Saulius Širmelis	(Lithuania)	2006	2006
Igoris Pankratjevas	(Lithuania)	2007	2007
Šenderis Giršovičius	(Lithuania)	2008	2008
Valdas Ivanauskas	(Lithuania)	2009	2009
Vitalijus Stankevičius	(Lithuania)	2009	2011
Mindaugas Neoras	(Lithuania)	2011	2011
Vitalijus Stankevičius	(Lithuania)	2011	2012
Mindaugas Neoras	(Lithuania)	2012	2012
Arminas Narbekovas	(Lithuania)	2013	2015
Antanas Vingilys	(Lithuania)	2015	2016
Carit Falch	(Denmark)	2017	2018
Donatas Vencevičius	(Lithuania)	2019	2020
Marius Stankevičius	(Lithuania)	2021	2022
Fabio Mazzone	(Italy)	2022	2022
Tomas Ražanauskas	(Lithuania)	2022	2024
Rokas Garastas	(Lithuania)	2025	2026
Andrius Skerla	(Lithuania)	2026	

== See also ==
- Lithuania national football team
- Lithuania national under-19 football team
- Lithuania national under-17 football team
