= Viktor Kolyadko =

Russian footballer and coach

Personal information
- Full name: Viktor Andreyevich Kolyadko
- Date of birth: 28 July 1957 (age 69)
- Place of birth: Rostov-on-Don, Russian SFSR
- Height: 1.81 m (5 ft 11 1/2 in)
- Position: Forward

Senior career*
Years	Team	Apps	(Gls)
1976–1980	FC Terek Grozny	121	(45)
1980–1984	PFC CSKA Moscow	124	(21)
1985	SKA Odessa		
1986	FC Dnipro Dnipropetrovsk	10	(0)
1987	FC Spartak Moscow	1	(0)
1987–1988	FC Terek Grozny	49	(27)
1989	FC Metalurh Zaporizhya	8	(0)
1989	FC Terek Grozny	23	(13)
1990–1992	MŠK Žilina	?	(5)

Managerial career
- 1996: PFC CSKA Moscow (assistant)
- 1997: PFC CSKA-d Moscow (assistant)
- 2002–2003: FC Saturn-RenTV Ramenskoye (reserves)
- 2004: FC Saturn Ramenskoye (reserves assistant)
- 2005: FC Saturn Ramenskoye (assistant)
- 2006: FC Zvezda Serpukhov (administrator)
- 2007: FC Spartak-MZhK Ryazan (administrator)
- 2008: FC Lukhovitsy (assistant)
- 2009: FC Salyut-Energia Belgorod (assistant)
- * Club domestic league appearances and goals

Viktor Andreyevich Kolyadko (Russian: Виктор Андреевич Колядко; born 28 July 1957) is a Russian professional football coach and a former player.

== Honours ==
- Soviet Top League champion: 1987.
