= FK Žalgiris =

Lithuanian football club

Žalgiris
- Full name: Vilniaus futbolo klubas "Žalgiris"
- Nickname: Žaliai Balti (The Green Whites)
- Founded: 16 May 1947; 79 years ago
- Ground: FK Žalgiris' Home Stadium
- Capacity: 5,067
- Coordinates: 54°40′07″N 25°17′39″E
- Chairman: Mindaugas Kasperūnas
- Head coach: Andrius Skerla
- League: TOPLYGA
- 2026: TOPLYGA, 3rd of 10
- Website: www.fkzalgiris.lt
| Home colours | Away colours |

Futbolo klubas Žalgiris, commonly known as FK Žalgiris, Žalgiris Vilnius or simply Žalgiris, is a professional football club based in Vilnius, Lithuania. The club competes in the TOPLYGA, the top flight of Lithuanian football. The club was founded as Dinamo in 1947. The club's name commemorates the Battle of Žalgiris. Žalgiris has featured many Lithuanian football legends including Arminas Narbekovas, Valdas Ivanauskas, Edgaras Jankauskas and Deividas Šemberas. They have won the Lithuanian championship 10 times, the Lithuanian Football Cup 14 times, and the Lithuanian Supercup 7 times.

After beating Malmö in the second round of the Champions League qualifying in July 2022, Žalgiris became the first ever Lithuanian club to qualify for the group stages of a UEFA club competition; they dropped into the Europa Conference League group stage after losing in the Europa League play-offs. They would finish bottom of their group with five points.

== History ==
=== Foundation and Soviet period ===
The first incarnation of the club played in 1946 as a national team of Lithuanian Soviet Socialist Republic when it competed in USSR Group III Zone 4 championship and it was one of the clubs which represented one of the Soviet republics. The club consisted of Spartakas Kaunas and Dinamo Kaunas players. Their first match was against Stroitel Moscow which ended 1–1 and they were managed by French coach Emil Pastor. That year they finished in fourth place in RSFSR Western Zone championship.

The club is thought to have been founded in 1947 when it was moved from Kaunas to Vilnius and its name was changed to Dinamo Vilnius. First official match of the formed club was played on 16 May 1947 against Lokomotiv Moscow, who managed to defeat local team 1–2. Steponas Petraitis scored the first official goal for the club that day, beating goalkeeper from a penalty spot in 44th minute. The next year club changed its name to Spartakas Vilnius and used this name until the end of 1961 season. In 1962, they changed their name to Žalgiris.

Žalgiris competed in Soviet Union football league system from 1947 to 1989. Team achieved its first promotion to the top tier in 1952, but came last next season.

Before the start of the 1983 season in Soviet Top League, players initiative group demanded the resignation of coach Benjaminas Zelkevičius, and the players wish was granted as, Algimantas Liubinskas became the trainer. Start was cautious. A similar result 0–0 has played in Tashkent with Pakhtakor, in Leningrad with Zenit, in Vilnius with Dynamo. In the fourth match of the season against Neftchi in Baku, Gražulis scored goal on 1–0 and brought victory. There were victories and failures, but Žalgiris became the winners of the first round. In first place Žalgiris stayed short, Nevertheless, final fifth place is the highest achievement of Lithuanian football on this time and gives a great hope for future. Arminas Narbekovas, Romas Mažeikis, and Vladimiras Buzmakovas succeeded in the team in that season.

In 1984 Soviet Top League season, Žalgiris finished on 9 place among 18 teams, but rejoiced victories against FC Dynamo Kyiv (1–0 at home), FC Spartak Moscow (twice 2–1), FC Dynamo Moscow (1–0 at home, 2–1 in Moscow). and Valdas Ivanauskas debuted in first team.

The club's most successful season was in 1987 when they finished third in the Soviet Top League and qualified for 1988–89 UEFA Cup where they played against Austria Wien, while also for the first time in club's history reaching semi–finals of the 1987–88 Soviet Cup (after being eliminated in quarter-finals of the 1955, 1959–60, 1964 campaigns) and 1987 USSR Federation Cup. The club represented the Soviet Union at 1987 Summer Universiade which they won by defeating the South Korean team. In the following season they finished fifth and again qualified for UEFA Cup where they faced IFK Göteborg in the first round and Red Star Belgrade in the second. In 1988, several of Žalgiris players were decorated with medals in the USSR national teams: Vyacheslav Sukristov received silver medal of the UEFA Euro 1988, and Arminas Narbekovas and Arvydas Janonis brought back gold medals from the 1988 Summer Olympics. In 1989 the club finished in fourth place and for the third year in a row qualified for UEFA Cup. They managed to play one game in 1990 at the start of the season before withdrawing due to re-establishment of Lithuania's independence and joined the Baltic League which consisted of clubs from Lithuania, Latvia and Estonia. Therefore, they lost their place in UEFA Cup, which was taken by Chornomorets Odesa.

=== 1990–2007 ===
Following Lithuania's declaration of independence on 11 March 1990, Žalgiris left Soviet Top League with immediate effect. Despite most of the top players including Arminas Narbekovas, Valdas Ivanauskas, Igoris Pankratjevas, Vyacheslav Sukristov and Robertas Fridrikas leaving the club Žalgiris remained favorites to clinch the Lithuanian title and won A Lyga regular season having lost just once in 32 games. The championship, however, was decided by the knock-out competition where Žalgiris lost in the semi-finals to Ekranas Panevėžys and only managed to take a third place.

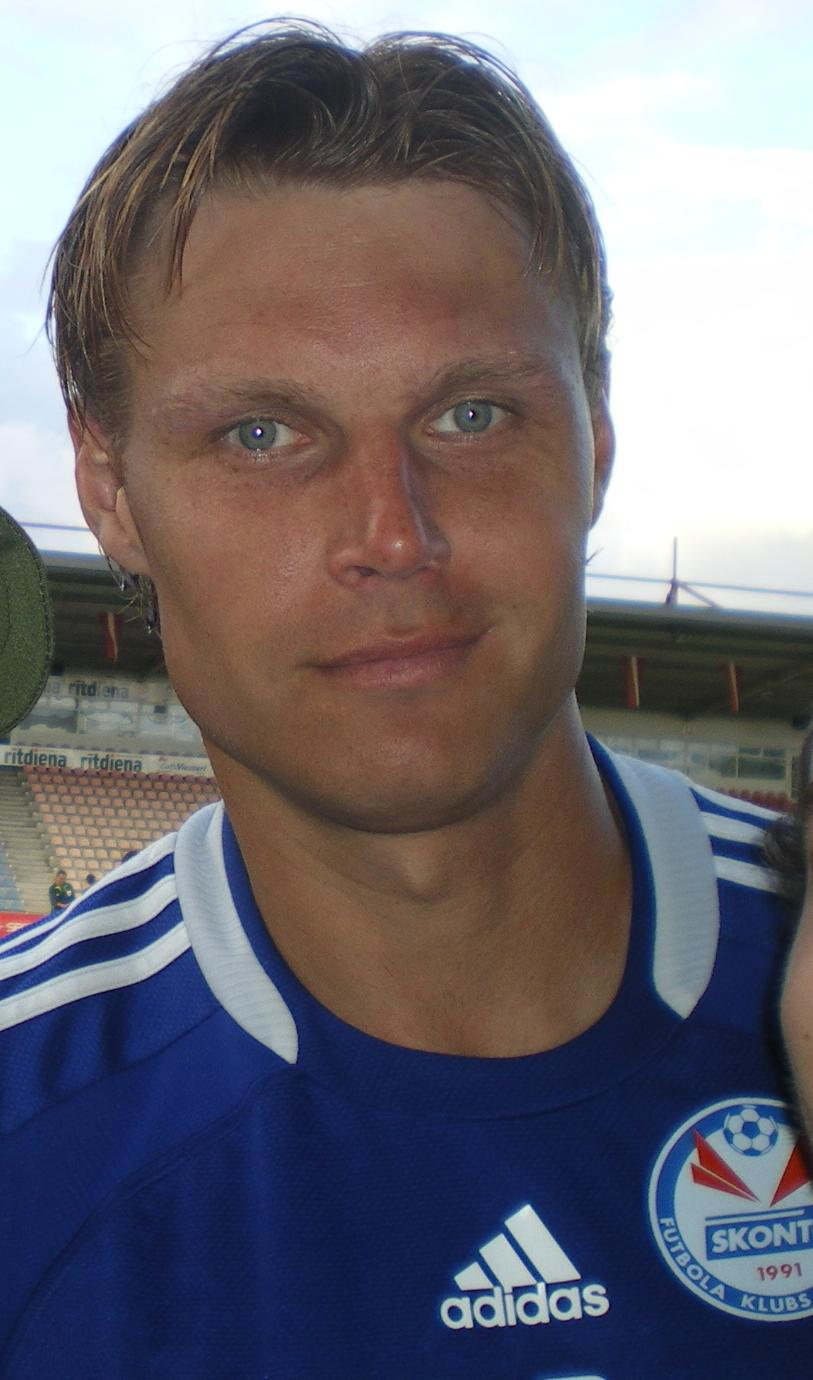
Edgaras Jankauskas scored 41 goals in 93 matches with Žalgiris (1991–1996).

Green and whites took their first A Lyga title the following season when they won the regular season, took the revenge against Ekranas beating them in the semi-finals and won the final against Lietuvos Makabi Vilnius 3–1 with Ričardas Zdančius scoring a hat-trick. Žalgiris completed the double later that year by winning the Lithuanian cup.

The 1991 season was followed by two significant changes in league format: the knock-out competition was removed and league was reorganized to be played from autumn until spring. Žalgiris saw off the challenge from Panerys Vilnius to defend their title by a single point. There were no double in this year, however: Lietuvos Makabi took revenge for their defeat in last season's league final and beat Žalgiris in the final 1–0. In the summer of 1992, Žalgiris made their debut in the UEFA Champions League. Europe's elite proved to be merciless: PSV Eindhoven hammered Žalgiris 8–0 on aggregate in the first round.

In 1992–93 season things went the other way round in national competitions: having lost the national title to FK Ekranas by three points Žalgiris reclaimed the cup, beating Sirijus Klaipėda 1–0 in the final courtesy of the extra-time goal by Aurelijus Skarbalius. A similar story happened in the 1993–94 season when ROMAR Mažeikiai narrowly beat Vilnius' side to the title while Žalgiris defended the cup by beating FK Ekranas 4–2 in the final. Darius Maciulevičius was the hero of that day scoring a hat-trick and Aidas Preikšaitis added another from the penalty spot.

1994–95 season delivered a double blow for the side from the capital. Žalgiris and Inkaras Kaunas finished the league locked on points at the top and extra match on neutral ground was set to be played. Inkaras Kaunas beat Žalgiris 2–0 in Panevėžys and four days later the same two teams met in Klaipėda for cup final. Inkaras once again came out better off as former Žalgiris man Eimantas Poderis scored twice in a 2–1 victory for Kaunas' side. 1995–96 season did not bring silverware either: free scoring Žalgiris side racked up 106 goals in just 28 games in the league yet could only take a third place, six points behind champions Inkaras Kaunas. On this time Edgaras Jankauskas was top scorer A Lyga with 25 goals. He was later sold to CSKA Moscow.

Things did not go well in the cup as well as Vilnius' side lost to Kareda Šiauliai in the semi-finals and failed to advance to the final for the first time in six years. Žalgiris reclaimed the cup in 1996–97 season as Donatas Vencevičius' penalty was enough to see off Inkaras in the final but had to settle for second in the league as Kareda coasted to the title with an 8-point margin. Green and whites mounted a stronger challenge in 1997–98 yet Kareda proved its success has been no fluke by defending their title.

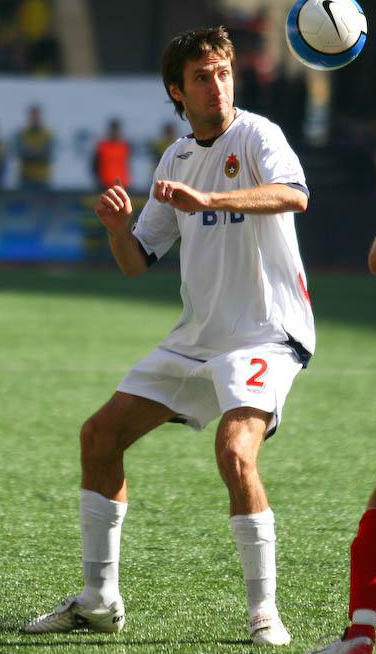
Deividas Šemberas started his career in Žalgiris (1996–1998)

The elusive title finally came in 1998–99 season, the last one to be played from autumn until spring. Defense was the key to success as Žalgiris conceded just 8 goals in 23 games and did not lose a single league match that season. Things were different in the cup as Kareda dismantled Žalgiris 7–0 on aggregate in the semi-finals. The league title allowed Žalgiris to have another try in the UEFA Champions League and this time Vilnius' side eliminated Armenian champions Araks Ararat before succumbing to a defeat to last season's semi-finalists Dynamo Kyiv in the second round.

With a turn of the century a new force rose in Lithuanian football: FBK Kaunas. Under the name of Žalgiris Kaunas they won the transitional shortened league season in 1999, with consecutive titles in 2000, 2001, 2002, 2003 and 2004. Žalgiris on the other hand went into decline and a cup final win in 2003 proved to be the sole victory for the club in the 2000s. In the league Žalgiris started to struggle as well. While in 1999 and 2000 green and whites finished second, 2001 saw them dropping to third, 2002 to fourth and 2005 to the recently unimaginable lows of eighth. Žalgiris was not even the strongest team in the capital as newcomers Vėtra and FC Vilnius were clearly having better time on the pitch.

Despite a constant presence in European competitions the results there were rarely encouraging with the aggregate defeats like 2–7 to Ruch Chorzow and 0–7 to Maccabi Tel Aviv. Budapest Honved and Portadown were the only teams eliminated by Žalgiris between 2000 and 2004. 2005 UEFA Intertoto Cup thus stood out as a major success as green and whites went past three teams – Lisburn Distillery, Dinaburg and Egaleo, before being eliminated by CFR Cluj.

=== 2008–2016 ===
The struggles of the noughties culminated in 2008. The league finish of fifth could have been seen as adequate for the time (20 points gap to fourth-placed Sūduva was harder to take) but as country's economy braced for the inevitable crisis, expenditures were cut and uncertainty rose Žalgiris was dealt a big blow when club owner Vadim Kastujev was arrested in Moscow. Striped of funds club survived until the end of the season but failed to meet licensing requirements for top flight competition in 2009. With old club's future very much in doubt fans of Žalgiris founded a new phoenix club called VMFD Žalgiris which had the same players and staff, and following unsuccessful application for A Lyga license entered second division.

A year outside of top flight proved to be difficult. Žalgiris finished sixth in seven team league and were eliminated from the cup in the Round of 16 by Sakuona Plikiai, a team from a town with a population of just 600. Despite this bleak performance the club received promotion to A Lyga as the number of teams in top flight was increased and some other clubs refused to join in mainly because of financial burden. Žalgiris finished 2010 season in the third place, their highest since 2001.

The fortunes of Žalgiris went all uphill from there. With FBK Kaunas in complete turmoil and Vėtra bankrupt Ekranas for several years became the undisputed superpower of Lithuanian football. Green and whites were closing in, however: Žalgiris took second in 2011, eight points adrift, and closed the gap to a single point a year later. Moreover, in 2012 Vilnius side finally ended their nine-year trophy drought and won Lithuanian Football Cup, beating Ekranas on penalties following a 0–0 draw. The same season saw Žalgiris returning to European competitions but their UEFA Europa League campaign proved to be short: following 1–1 draw in Vilnius, Admira Wacker Mödling hammered Žalgiris 5–1 in the second leg of the second qualifying round.

Žalgiris were considered to be strong favorites for the title before the 2013 season and for much of the season it looked that they would cruise to the championship. Žalgiris had eleven points lead over second-placed Atlantas with five games remaining but four draws in the row followed and before the final match of the season the gap at the top was reduced to three points. In final match out of form Žalgiris proved to be no match for Sūduva and for much of the day prospect of season decider on neutral venue looked very likely. However, in tense atmosphere it was Atlantas who ultimately let it slip as they could only draw the game with Banga Gargždai and Žalgiris celebrated their first title in fourteen years. Victory in Cup final against Šiauliai meant that the double was won—the first since 1991. The great year was backed up by successful performance in UEFA Europa League where Vilnius' side eliminated St. Patrick's Athletic, Pyunik Yerevan and Lech Poznan before losing out to Red Bull Salzburg.

Defending the title in 2014 proved to be far more routine task. Žalgiris finished the season 18 points clear of second-placed Kruoja Pakruojis (the largest winning margin in the league since 2006) and also claimed the cup for the third time in the row, beating Banga Gargždai 2–1 in the final. The club made return to UEFA Champions League after fourteen-year absence yet it did not bring much joy as Dinamo Zagreb beat Žalgiris 4–0 on aggregate in the second qualifying round.

In May 2015 Žalgiris won Lithuanian cup for a record fourth time in the row, beating Atlantas 2–0 in the final. UEFA Champions League campaign was again limited to just two games as Malmo won the return leg in Vilnius 1–0 after goalless first match in Sweden. Žalgiris finished the season top of the league, ten points clear of second-placed Trakai thus claiming third successive title.

In the 2016 season, Žalgiris continued its dominance in Lithuanian football in 2016 with fourth consecutive league title and, remarkably, two cup wins. LFF Cup was rescheduled to be played from spring until autumn that year and therefore two editions of the cup have been played that year. Žalgiris won the first final in May with 1–0 extra time win over Trakai and backed it up with 2–0 final win over Sūduva in September. European experience proved to heartbreaking as following a goalless draw in the first leg in Vilnius Žalgiris was a whisker away from eliminating Astana only to concede an injury time goal to lose the game 2–1.

=== 2016–present ===
In the 2017 season, Žalgiris failed to progress beyond the Champions League's second qualifying round once again in 2017 when impressive first leg win over Ludogorets Razgrad and an early goal by Serge Nyuiadzi in the second leg were completely undone by four straight goals by Bulgarian side. In September 2017, Žalgiris reached the seventh consecutive cup final, where they lost to Stumbras, who appeared in their first major final. Žalgiris failed to defend the league title, while they were in top position of the standings until October 2017, but a late march by Sūduva saw them winning their first-ever championship.

In the 2018 season, Žalgiris finished in second place as Sūduva defended their league title, while Žalgiris managed to win the cup in a repeat of last year's final as they defeated Stumbras. Playing in the UEFA Europa League, Žalgiris reached the third qualifying round where they lost to Spain's Sevilla, which was their best performance in European competition since 2013 when they reached the play-off round of the qualification in the UEFA Europa League. In November 2018, Žalgiris announced that Deividas Česnauskis and Deividas Šemberas joined the club. Česnauskis was appointed as sports director, Šemberas as the director of sports operations.

During the 2019 preseason, head coach Valdas Urbonas signed a contract with the Lithuanian Football Federation and became the head coach of Lithuania national team. Žalgiris then appointed Marek Zub, who was previously successfully working in the club, as head coach. However, Zub left Žalgiris on 15 July 2019. João Luís Martins, who became available after the dissolution of FC Stumbras, took on the job of head coach on a temporary basis until the end of the season.

In January 2020, Žalgiris announced the appointment of Juan Ferrando as head coach. However, Ferrando was forced to pull out due to health issues. Later that month, Alyaksey Baha was signed as the team's new head coach. He started off with a success by winning the Lithuanian Supercup on 29 February against champions FK Sūduva. Žalgiris went on to win the 2020 A Lyga. In both 2021 and 2022, they won the double consisting of the A Lyga and LFF cup title.

In July 2022, after beating Malmö 3–0 on aggregate in the Champions League second qualifying round, Žalgiris made history by guaranteeing themselves group stage football for the season. They played Ludogorets in the play-off of the Europa League, but lost on aggregate and dropped into the Conference League group stage. They were the first ever Lithuanian club to qualify for the group stages of a UEFA club competition. Žalgiris were subsequently drawn into Group H against the Swiss stalwarts Basel, Slovak champions Slovan Bratislava and Armenian champions Pyunik. The team would finish bottom of the group with five points from their six matches.

Žalgiris finished the 2023 A Lyga season in second place, twelve points behind winning team FK Panevėžys, who won their first-ever league title. At the end of the season, Saulius Mikoliūnas, who had been with the club since 2016 and has appeared in over 200 games for Žalgiris, retired from professional football.

== Name history ==
- 1947 – Dinamo Vilnius
- 1948 – Spartakas Vilnius
- 1962 – Žalgiris Vilnius
- 1993 – Žalgiris–EBSW Vilnius
- 1995 – FK Žalgiris (Vilnius)
- 2009 – VMFD Žalgiris
- 2015 – FK Žalgiris (Vilnius)

== Stadium ==
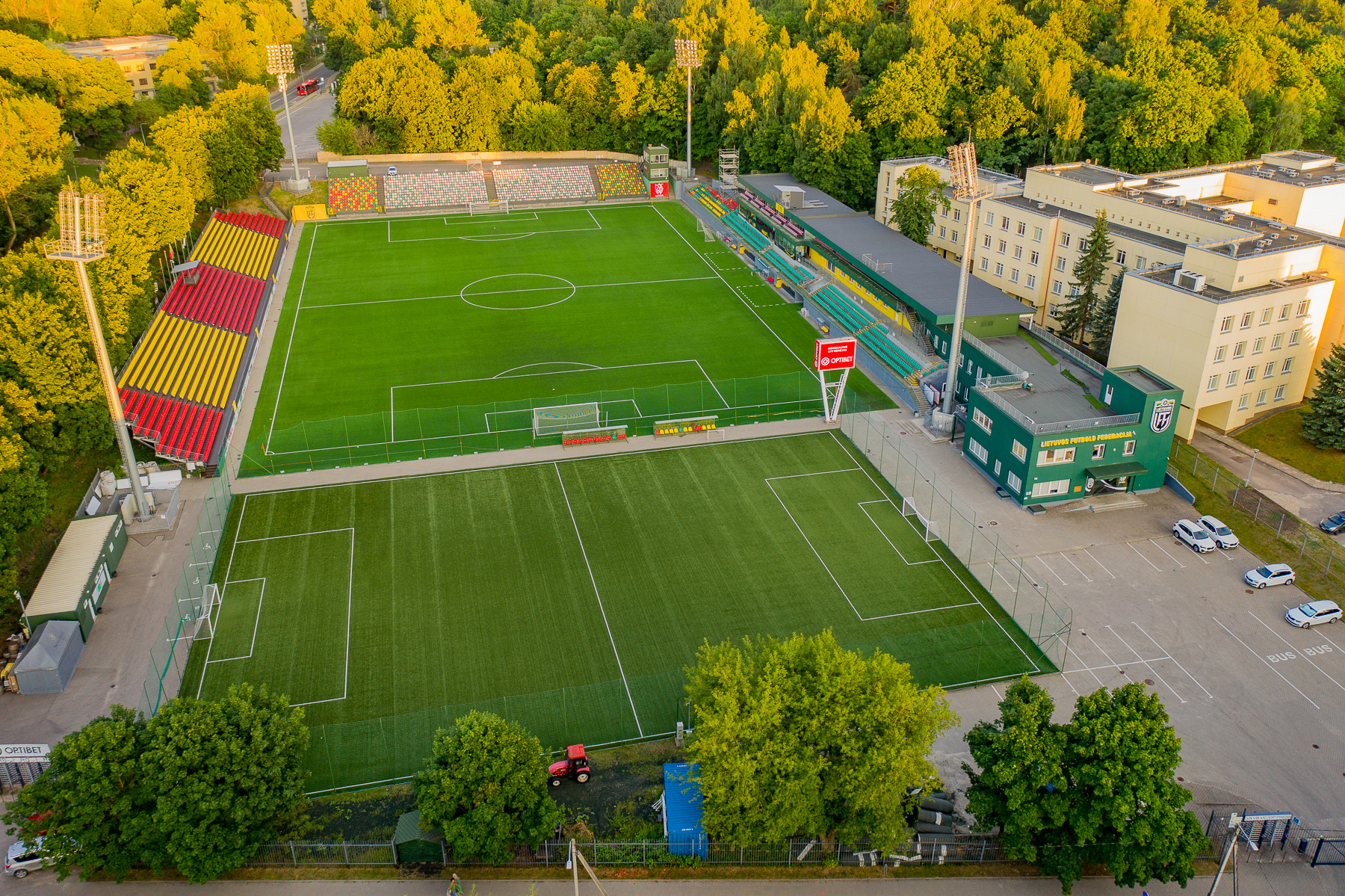
FK Žalgiris Home Stadium

For the majority of the time Žalgiris played in Žalgiris Stadium. This stadium was the biggest in Lithuania and had a capacity of 15,029. Since 2011, Žalgiris plays in LFF Stadium (Lithuanian Football Federation stadium). This arena, formerly known as Vėtra Stadium, was built in 2004 and holds around 5,000 people.

== Supporters ==
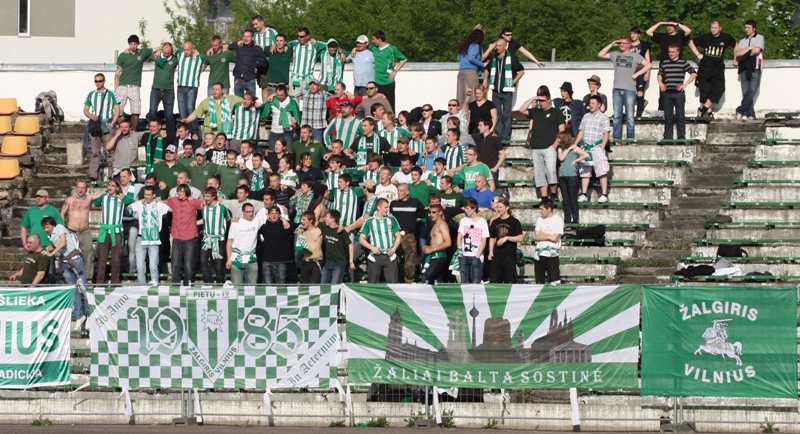
Pietų IV

The official club of Žalgiris' fans is named Pietų IV.

The establishment date of Pietų IV is considered October 1985. During difficult periods, they organized various charity events. Žalgiris supporters maintain friendly relations with fans of Atlantas. Internationally, there are close historical ties with supporters of Dynamo Kyiv, Karpaty Lviv and Dinamo Tbilisi.

== Kit ==
From the establishment of the club, Žalgiris colours were blue, red or sometimes orange. In the 1980s green and white kits were introduced, establishing green/white tradition. From then on, the kit is usually a green and white striped jersey and green/white variation of shorts and socks. In the past there have also been checkered green-white jersey designs. Away kits are usually plain white or green.

| 1988 | 1991 | 1996 | 2007 home | 2007 away | 2016 home | 2016 away | 2017 home | 2017 away | 2018 home | 2018 away |

| GK kit 2018 home | GK kit 2018 away |

=== Kit manufacturers and shirt sponsors ===
| Period | Kit manufacturer | Shirt sponsor |
|---|---|---|
| 1947–1972 | — | — |
| 1973–1979 | unknown | |
| 1980–1987 | Adidas | — |
| 1988–1989 | Adidas | Danieli |
| 1990–1992 | Adidas | — |
| 1992–1993 | Umbro | FINPLAN |
| 1993–1995 | Adidas | EBSW |
| 1995–1996 | Umbro | EBSW |
| 1996–1999 | Diadora | — |
| 1999–2000 | Adidas | — |
| 2001 | Hummel | Ūkio bankas |
| 2002 | Hummel | Tauras |
| 2003–2004 | Hummel | — |
| 2005 | Adidas | — |
| 2006–2009 | Hummel | — |
| 2010–2012 | Hummel | Unibet |
| 2013–2015 | Kappa | Top Sport |
| 2016–2021 | Nike | Top Sport |
| 2022–2024 | Nike | Betsafe / Betsson |
| 2025–present | Hummel | Betsafe / Betsson |

== Club crest ==
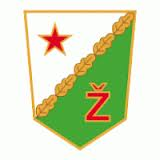
1962–1989

1989–2008

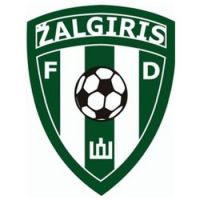
2009–2011

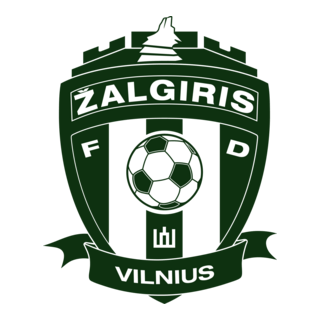
2012–2014

2015–present

== Players ==
=== Current squad ===
As of 15 July 2026

Note: Flags indicate national team as defined under FIFA eligibility rules; some limited exceptions apply. Players may hold more than one non-FIFA nationality.

| No. | Pos. | Nation | Player |
|---|---|---|---|
| 1 | GK | VEN | Carlos Olses |
| 4 | DF | BEL | Danny Lupano |
| 5 | DF | ROU | Grigore Turda |
| 6 | MF | CRO | Marko Capan |
| 7 | MF | SRB | Nemanja Mihajlović |
| 8 | FW | ROU | Liviu Antal |
| 9 | MF | LTU | Gustas Jarusevičius |
| 10 | MF | LTU | Paulius Golubickas |
| 11 | FW | SRB | Nikola Petković |
| 12 | GK | LTU | Vincentas Šarkauskas |
| 13 | DF | LTU | Klaudijus Upstas |
| 14 | DF | LTU | Martynas Šetkus |
| 15 | DF | CRO | Petar Bosančić |
| 17 | MF | LTU | Giedrius Matulevičius |
| 18 | MF | LTU | Deividas Šešplaukis |

| No. | Pos. | Nation | Player |
|---|---|---|---|
| 19 | FW | UKR | Stanislav Bilenkyi |
| 20 | MF | UKR | Ivan Lytvynenko |
| 21 | DF | GER | Dominik Franke |
| 22 | MF | LTU | Ovidijus Verbickas |
| 23 | DF | GEO | Saba Mamatsashvili |
| 25 | DF | LTU | Vytis Pavilonis |
| 27 | FW | LTU | Matas Vareika (on loan from Pyunik) |
| 29 | MF | LTU | Kajus Bička |
| 33 | MF | LTU | Nedas Klimavičius |
| 44 | DF | LTU | Patrik Matyžonok |
| 70 | FW | CPV | Bryan Teixeira |
| 77 | DF | BLR | Yury Kendysh |
| 88 | MF | LTU | Dariuš Stankevičius |
| 95 | GK | LTU | Dominykas Čekavičius |

== Staff ==
| Administration | Senior team | Youth teams | Medical |
|---|---|---|---|
| President – (Lithuania) Andrius Tapinas; Chairman – (Lithuania) Mindaugas Kasperūnas; Director of Football – (Lithuania) Giedrius Klevinskas | Men's: Manager – (Lithuania) Andrius Skerla; Assistant Manager – (Lithuania) Rolandas Džiaukštas; Assistant Manager – (Lithuania) Nerijus Mačiulis; Goalkeeping coach – (Lithuania) Vladislav Korovin; Athletic coach – (Lithuania) Edgaras Lukoševičius; Analyst – (Lithuania) Gintaras Staučė JR; Women's: Manager – (Lithuania) Markas Razmartas | B team head coach – (Lithuania) Dainius Greviškis; C team head coach – (Ukraine) Roman Lenskiy; Athletic coach – (Lithuania) Andrius Osvaldo Alfieri; Academy director – (Lithuania) Žydrūnas Grudzinskas | Chief doctor – (Lithuania) Tomas Jonaitis; Head physio – (Lithuania) Indrė Venskevičiūtė; Women's team physio – (Lithuania) Goda Papartytė; Masseur – (Lithuania) Vidmantas Ričkus |

== Participation in Lithuanian championships ==
- 1990 Lithuanian football championship – 3rd
- 1991 Lithuanian football championship – 1st
- 1991–92 LFF Lyga – 1st
- 1992–93 LFF Lyga – 2nd
- 1993–94 LFF Lyga – 2nd
- 1994–95 LFF Lyga – 2nd
- 1995–96 LFF Lyga – 3rd
- 1996–97 LFF Lyga – 2nd
- 1997–98 LFF Lyga – 2nd
- 1998–99 LFF Lyga – 1st
- 1999 A Lyga – 2nd
- 2000 A Lyga – 2nd
- 2001 A Lyga – 3rd
- 2002 A Lyga – 4th
- 2003 A Lyga – 4th
- 2004 A Lyga – 4th
- 2005 A Lyga – 8th
- 2006 A Lyga – 4th
- 2007 A Lyga – 4th
- 2008 A Lyga – 5th
- 2009 I Lyga – 6th
- 2010 A Lyga – 3rd
- 2011 A Lyga – 2nd
- 2012 A Lyga – 2nd
- 2013 A Lyga – 1st
- 2014 A Lyga – 1st
- 2015 A Lyga – 1st
- 2016 A Lyga – 1st
- 2017 A Lyga – 2nd
- 2018 A Lyga – 2nd
- 2019 A Lyga – 2nd
- 2020 A Lyga – 1st
- 2021 A Lyga – 1st
- 2022 A Lyga – 1st
- 2023 A Lyga - 2nd
- 2024 A Lyga – 1st
- 2025 A Lyga – 3rd

== European record ==
=== UEFA club competition record ===
As of 14 August 2026

| Competition | Played | Won | Drew | Lost | GF | GA | GD | Win% |
|---|---|---|---|---|---|---|---|---|
| European Cup / Champions League | 30 | 9 | 8 | 13 | 27 | 43 | −16 | 30.00 |
| Cup Winners' Cup | 12 | 3 | 3 | 6 | 16 | 13 | +3 | 25.00 |
| UEFA Cup / UEFA Europa League | 48 | 14 | 10 | 24 | 49 | 89 | −40 | 29.17 |
| UEFA Intertoto Cup | 14 | 5 | 2 | 7 | 15 | 21 | −6 | 35.71 |
| Europa Conference League / Conference League | 22 | 7 | 4 | 11 | 26 | 41 | −15 | 31.82 |
| Total | 126 | 38 | 27 | 61 | 133 | 207 | −74 | 30.16 |

Legend: GF = goals for; GA = goals against; GD = goal difference

=== Matches ===
| Season | Competition | Round | Country | Club | Home | Away | Aggregate |
|---|---|---|---|---|---|---|---|
| 1988–89 | UEFA Cup | 1R | (Austria) | Austria Wien | 2–0 | 2–5 | 4–5 |
| 1989–90 | UEFA Cup | 1R | (Sweden) | IFK Göteborg | 2–0 | 0–1 | 2–1 |
| 1989–90 | UEFA Cup | 2R | (Socialist Federal Republic of Yugoslavia) | Red Star Belgrade | 0–1 | 1–4 | 1–5 |
| 1992–93 | UEFA Champions League | 1R | (Netherlands) | PSV Eindhoven | 0–2 | 0–6 | 0–8 |
| 1993–94 | European Cup Winners' Cup | 1Q | (Slovakia) | MFK Košice | 0–1 | 1–2 | 1–3 |
| 1994–95 | UEFA Cup Winners' Cup | 1Q | (Wales) | Barry Town | 6–0 | 1–0 | 7–0 |
| 1994–95 | UEFA Cup Winners' Cup | 1R | (Netherlands) | Feyenoord | 1–1 | 1–2 | 2–3 |
| 1995–96 | UEFA Cup Winners' Cup | 1Q | (Slovenia) | NK Mura | 2–0 | 1–2 | 3–2 |
| 1995–96 | UEFA Cup Winners' Cup | 1R | (Turkey) | Trabzonspor | 2–2 | 0–1 | 2–3 |
| 1996–97 | UEFA Cup | PR | (Northern Ireland) | Crusaders | 2–0 | 1–2 | 3–2 |
| 1996–97 | UEFA Cup | 1R | (Scotland) | Aberdeen | 1–4 | 3–1 | 4–5 |
| 1997–98 | UEFA Cup Winners' Cup | 1Q | (Israel) | Hapoel Be'er Sheva | 0–0 | 1–2 (aet) | 1–2 |
| 1998–99 | UEFA Cup | 1Q | (Iceland) | ÍA | 1–0 | 2–3 | 3–3 (a) |
| 1998–99 | UEFA Cup | 2Q | (Norway) | Brann | 0–0 | 0–1 | 0–1 |
| 1999–2000 | UEFA Champions League | 1Q | (Armenia) | Araks Ararat | 2–0 | 3–0 | 5–0 |
| 1999–2000 | UEFA Champions League | 2Q | (Ukraine) | Dynamo Kyiv | 0–1 | 0–2 | 0–3 |
| 2000–01 | UEFA Cup | 1Q | (Poland) | Ruch Chorzów | 2–1 | 0–6 | 2–7 |
| 2001–02 | UEFA Cup | 1Q | (Israel) | Maccabi Tel Aviv | 0–1 | 0–6 | 0–7 |
| 2002 | UEFA Intertoto Cup | 1R | (Hungary) | Budapest Honvéd | 0–0 | 1–0 | 1–0 |
| 2002 | UEFA Intertoto Cup | 2R | (France) | Sochaux | 1–2 | 0–2 | 1–4 |
| 2003 | UEFA Intertoto Cup | 1R | (Sweden) | Örgryte IS | 1–1 | 0–3 | 1–4 |
| 2004–05 | UEFA Cup | 1Q | (Northern Ireland) | Portadown | 2–0 | 2–2 | 4–2 |
| 2004–05 | UEFA Cup | 2Q | (Denmark) | Aalborg BK | 1–3 | 0–0 | 1–3 |
| 2005 | UEFA Intertoto Cup | 1R | (Northern Ireland) | Lisburn Distillery | 1–0 | 1–0 | 2–0 |
| 2005 | UEFA Intertoto Cup | 2R | (Latvia) | Dinaburg | 2–0 | 1–2 | 3–2 |
| 2005 | UEFA Intertoto Cup | 3R | (Greece) | Egaleo | 2–3 | 3–1 | 5–4 |
| 2005 | UEFA Intertoto Cup | 1/2 | (Romania) | CFR Ecomax Cluj | 1–2 | 1–5 | 2–7 |
| 2012–13 | UEFA Europa League | 2Q | (Austria) | Admira Wacker Mödling | 1–1 | 1–5 | 2–6 |
| 2013–14 | UEFA Europa League | 1Q | (Republic of Ireland) | St Patrick's Athletic | 2–2 | 2–1 | 4–3 |
| 2013–14 | UEFA Europa League | 2Q | (Armenia) | Pyunik | 2–0 | 1–1 | 3–1 |
| 2013–14 | UEFA Europa League | 3Q | (Poland) | Lech Poznań | 1–0 | 1–2 | 2–2 (a) |
| 2013–14 | UEFA Europa League | PO | (Austria) | Red Bull Salzburg | 0–2 | 0–5 | 0–7 |
| 2014–15 | UEFA Champions League | 2Q | (Croatia) | Dinamo Zagreb | 0–2 | 0–2 | 0–4 |
| 2015–16 | UEFA Champions League | 2Q | (Sweden) | Malmö FF | 0–1 | 0–0 | 0–1 |
| 2016–17 | UEFA Champions League | 2Q | (Kazakhstan) | Astana | 0–0 | 1–2 | 1–2 |
| 2017–18 | UEFA Champions League | 2Q | (Bulgaria) | Ludogorets Razgrad | 2–1 | 1–4 | 3–5 |
| 2018–19 | UEFA Europa League | 1Q | (Faroe Islands) | KÍ Klaksvík | 1–1 | 2–1 | 3–2 |
| 2018–19 | UEFA Europa League | 2Q | (Liechtenstein) | Vaduz | 1–0 | 1–1 | 2–1 |
| 2018–19 | UEFA Europa League | 3Q | (Spain) | Sevilla | 0–5 | 0–1 | 0–6 |
| 2019–20 | UEFA Europa League | 1Q | (Hungary) | Honvéd | 1–1 | 1–3 | 2–4 |
| 2020–21 | UEFA Europa League | 1Q | (Estonia) | Paide Linnameeskond | 2–0 | —N/a | —N/a |
| 2020–21 | UEFA Europa League | 2Q | (Norway) | Bodø/Glimt | —N/a | 1–3 | —N/a |
| 2021–22 | UEFA Champions League | 1Q | (Northern Ireland) | Linfield | 3–1 | 2–1 | 5–2 |
| 2021–22 | UEFA Champions League | 2Q | (Hungary) | Ferencváros | 1–3 | 0–2 | 1–5 |
| 2021–22 | UEFA Europa League | 3Q | (Slovenia) | Mura | 0–1 | 0–0 | 0−1 |
| 2021–22 | UEFA Europa Conference League | PO | (Norway) | Bodø/Glimt | 2–2 | 0–1 | 2–3 |
| 2022–23 | UEFA Champions League | 1Q | (Kosovo) | Ballkani | 1–0 (aet) | 1–1 | 2–1 |
| 2022–23 | UEFA Champions League | 2Q | (Sweden) | Malmö FF | 1–0 | 2–0 | 3–0 |
| 2022–23 | UEFA Champions League | 3Q | (Norway) | Bodø/Glimt | 1–1 | 0–5 | 1–6 |
| 2022–23 | UEFA Europa League | PO | (Bulgaria) | Ludogorets Razgrad | 3–3 (aet) | 0–1 | 3–4 |
| 2022–23 | UEFA Europa Conference League | Group H | (Switzerland) | Basel | 0–1 | 2–2 | 4th |
| 2022–23 | UEFA Europa Conference League | Group H | (Slovakia) | Slovan Bratislava | 1–2 | 0–0 | 4th |
| 2022–23 | UEFA Europa Conference League | Group H | (Armenia) | Pyunik | 2–1 | 0–2 | 4th |
| 2023–24 | UEFA Champions League | 1Q | (North Macedonia) | Struga | 0–0 | 2–1 | 2–1 |
| 2023–24 | UEFA Champions League | 2Q | (Turkey) | Galatasaray | 2–2 | 0–1 | 2−3 |
| 2023–24 | UEFA Europa League | 3Q | (Sweden) | BK Häcken | 1–3 | 0–5 | 1–8 |
| 2023–24 | UEFA Europa Conference League | PO | (Hungary) | Ferencváros | 0–4 | 0–3 | 0–7 |
| 2024–25 | UEFA Conference League | 1Q | (Finland) | VPS | 1–0 | 2–1 | 3–1 |
| 2024–25 | UEFA Conference League | 2Q | (Cyprus) | Pafos | 2–1 | 0–3 (aet) | 2−4 |
| 2025–26 | UEFA Champions League | 1Q | (Malta) | Ħamrun Spartans | 2–0 | 0–2 (aet) | 2−2 (10–11 p) |
| 2025–26 | UEFA Conference League | 2Q | (Northern Ireland) | Linfield | 0–0 | 0–2 | 0–2 |
| 2026–27 | UEFA Conference League | 1Q | (Montenegro) | OFK Petrovac | 2–1 | 3–1 | 5–2 |
| 2026–27 | UEFA Conference League | 2Q | (Georgia (country)) | Dinamo Tbilisi | 7–2 | 0–3 | 7–5 |
| 2026–27 | UEFA Conference League | 3Q | (Croatia) | Hajduk Split | 2–5 | 0–4 | 2–9 |
| 2027–28 | UEFA Conference League | 1Q | | | | | |

=== UEFA coefficient ===
Correct as of 14 August 2026

| Rank | Team | Points |
|---|---|---|
| ▼133 | (Armenia) Noah | 11.750 |
| ▼134 | (Iceland) Víkingur | 11.750 |
| ▼135 | (Bosnia and Herzegovina) Borac | 11.625 |
| ▲136 | (Lithuania) Žalgiris | 11.500 |
| ▼137 | (Kosovo) Ballkani | 11.500 |
| ▼138 | (Armenia) Pyunik | 11.500 |
| ▼139 | (Kazakhstan) Astana | 11.500 |

== Honours ==
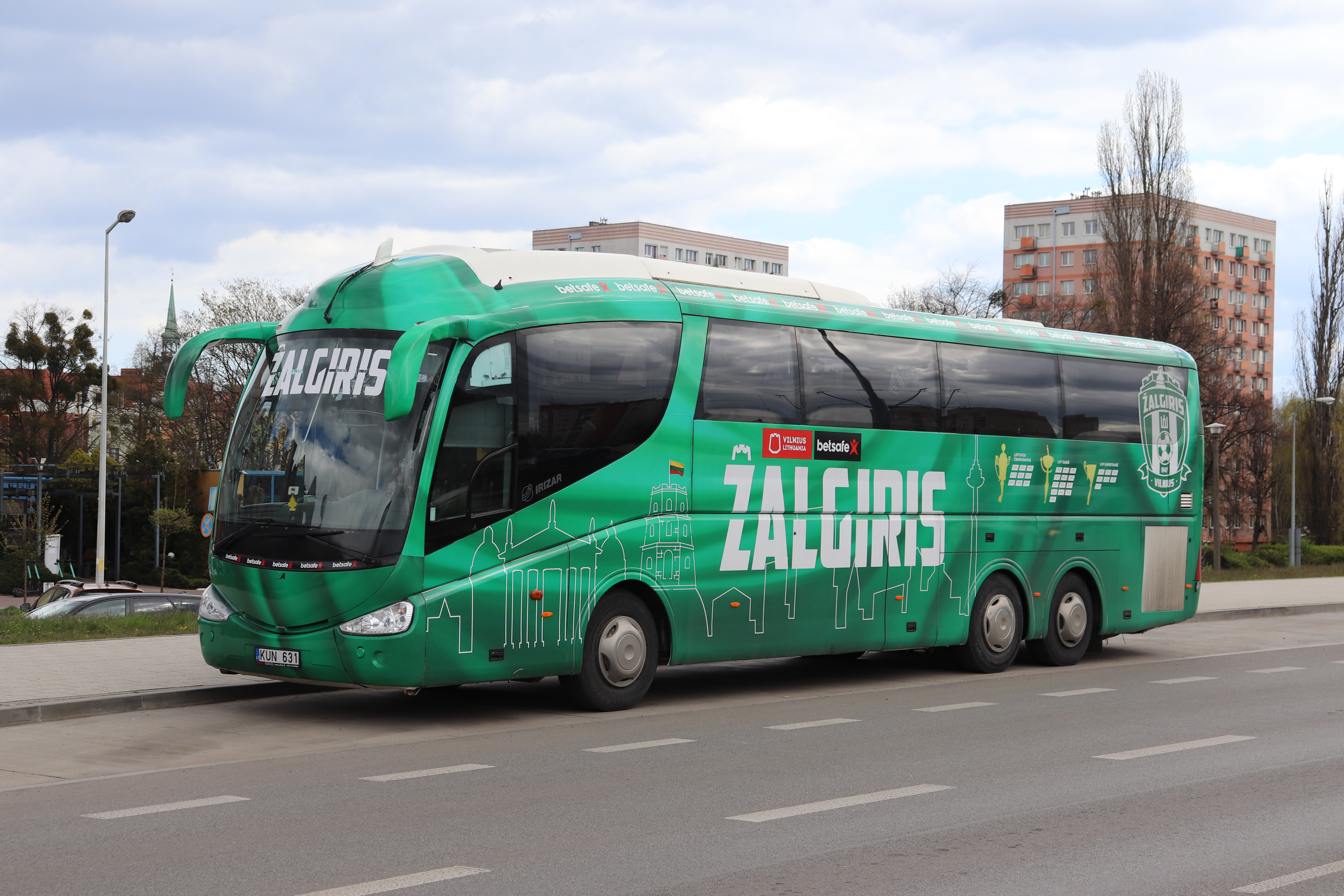
The team bus of Žalgiris inscribed with the title years

=== Domestic ===
(Lithuania) Lithuanian Championship:

- Champions – 11

1991, 1991–92, 1998–99, 2013, 2014, 2015, 2016, 2020, 2021, 2022, 2024

- Runners-up – 13

1992–93, 1993–94, 1994–95, 1996–97, 1997–98, 1999, 2000, 2011, 2012, 2017, 2018, 2019, 2023

- 3rd place – 4

1990, 1995–96, 2001, 2010

Lithuanian Cup:

- Winners – 14

1991, 1992–93, 1993–94, 1996–97, 2003, 2011–12, 2012–13, 2013–14, 2014–15, 2015–16, 2016, 2018, 2021, 2022

- Finalists – 6

1990, 1992, 1995, 2000, 2001, 2017

Lithuanian Super Cup:

- Winners – 9

2003, 2013, 2014, 2015, 2016, 2017, 2020, 2023, 2025

(Soviet Union) Soviet Championship:

Soviet Top League:

- 3rd place – 1

1987

Soviet First League:

- Champions – 1

1982

- Runners-up – 3

1952, 1954, 1966

- 3rd place – 1

1950

Soviet Second League:

- Runners-up – 1

1977

=== International ===
Chico Science Cup

- Champions – 1

2015

Baltic League:

- Champions – 1

1990

Summer Universiade:

- Champions – 1

1987

Intertoto Cup:

- Semi-finalists – 1

2005

== Individual awards ==
=== Domestic ===
Lithuanian Footballer of the Year

- 1965 – (Lithuanian Soviet Socialist Republic) Petras Glodenis
- 1966 – (Lithuanian Soviet Socialist Republic) Gintautas Kalėdinskas
- 1967 – (Lithuanian Soviet Socialist Republic) Stanislovas Ramelis
- 1968 – (Lithuanian Soviet Socialist Republic) Stanislovas Ramelis
- 1969 – (Lithuanian Soviet Socialist Republic) Juzefas Jurgelevičius
- 1970 – (Lithuanian Soviet Socialist Republic) Romualdas Juška
- 1971 – (Lithuanian Soviet Socialist Republic) Benjaminas Zelkevičius
- 1972 – (Lithuanian Soviet Socialist Republic) Benjaminas Zelkevičius
- 1973 – (Lithuanian Soviet Socialist Republic) Petras Glodenis
- 1974 – (Lithuanian Soviet Socialist Republic) Algirdas Žilinskas
- 1975 – (Lithuanian Soviet Socialist Republic) Vytautas Dirmeikis
- 1976 – (Lithuanian Soviet Socialist Republic) Eugenijus Riabovas
- 1977 – (Lithuanian Soviet Socialist Republic) Eugenijus Riabovas
- 1978 – (Lithuanian Soviet Socialist Republic) Eugenijus Riabovas
- 1979 – (Lithuanian Soviet Socialist Republic) Stanislovas Danisevičius
- 1980 – (Lithuanian Soviet Socialist Republic) Juzefas Jurgelevičius
- 1981 – (Lithuanian Soviet Socialist Republic) Vytautas Dirmeikis
- 1982 – (Lithuanian Soviet Socialist Republic) Sigitas Jakubauskas
- 1983 – (Lithuanian Soviet Socialist Republic) Valdas Kasparavičius
- 1984 – (Lithuanian Soviet Socialist Republic) Stanislovas Danisevičius
- 1988 – (Lithuanian Soviet Socialist Republic) / (Lithuania) Arminas Narbekovas
- 1989 – (Lithuanian Soviet Socialist Republic) / (Lithuania) Valdemaras Martinkėnas
- 2022 – (Lithuania) Edvinas Gertmonas

A Lyga Player of the Year

- 1992 – (Lithuania) Virginijus Baltušnikas
- 1994 – (Lithuania) Aurelijus Skarbalius
- 2014 – (Lithuania) Deividas Šemberas
- 2016 – (Lithuania) Mantas Kuklys
- 2020 – (Lithuania) Saulius Mikoliūnas
- 2021 – (France) Hugo Vidémont
- 2024 – (Lithuania) Paulius Golubickas

A Lyga Golden Boot

- 1994–95 – (Lithuania) Eimantas Poderis – 24
- 1995–96 – (Lithuania) Edgaras Jankauskas – 25
- 1999 – (Lithuania) Nerijus Vasiliauskas – 10
- 2010 – (Lithuania) Deivydas Matulevičius – 19
- 2016 – (Serbia) Andrija Kaluđerović – 20
- 2017 – (Lithuania) Darvydas Šernas – 18
- 2018 – (Romania) Liviu Antal – 23
- 2019 – (Croatia) Tomislav Kiš – 25
- 2020 – (France) Hugo Vidémont – 13
- 2021 – (France) Hugo Vidémont – 17
- 2022 – (Brazil) Renan Oliveira – 17
- 2023 – (Nigeria) Mathias Oyewusi – 19
- 2024 – (Romania) Liviu Antal – 20

=== International ===
UEFA's Golden Player

- (Lithuania) Arminas Narbekovas

==== Žalgiris players in International tournaments ====
| Tournament | Participant |
|---|---|
| 1988 Summer Olympics | Arminas Narbekovas |
| 1988 Summer Olympics | Arvydas Janonis |
| UEFA Euro 1988 | Vyacheslav Sukristov |

== Žalgiris Player of the Year ==
Lists of the winners of Žalgiris Player of the Year award instituted from 2004 as voted by the official members of Žalgiris supporters club – Pietų IV:

| Year | Winner |
|---|---|
| 2004 | (Lithuania) Mindaugas Malinauskas |
| 2005 | (Lithuania) Virmantas Lemežis |
| 2006 | (Lithuania) Igoris Morinas |
| 2007 | (Lithuania) Igoris Morinas |
| 2008 | (Lithuania) Igoris Morinas |
| 2009 | (Lithuania) Edgaras Mastianica |
| 2010 | (Russia) Pavel Komolov |
| 2011 | (Lithuania) Marius Rapalis |

| Year | Winner |
|---|---|
| 2012 | (Poland) Kamil Biliński |
| 2013 | (Lithuania) Mantas Kuklys |
| 2014 | (Lithuania) Deividas Šemberas |
| 2015 | (Croatia) Andro Švrljuga |
| 2016 | (Serbia) Andrija Kaluđerović |
| 2017 | (Senegal) Mamadou Mbodj |
| 2018 | (Romania) Liviu Antal |
| 2019 | (Croatia) Tomislav Kiš |

| Year | Winner |
|---|---|
| 2020 | (Lithuania) Saulius Mikoliūnas |
| 2021 | (France) Hugo Vidémont |
| 2022 | (Lithuania) Edvinas Gertmonas |
| 2023 | (Lithuania) Edvinas Gertmonas |
| 2024 | (Lithuania) Paulius Golubickas |
| 2025 | (Romania) Liviu Antal |

== Notable players ==
FK Žalgiris players who have either appeared for their respective national team at any time or received an individual award while at the club. Players whose name is listed in bold represented their countries while playing for Žalgiris.

Lithuania

- Vidas Alunderis
- Nerijus Astrauskas
- (Lithuanian Soviet Socialist Republic) / (Lithuania) **Virginijus Baltušnikas**
- (Lithuanian Soviet Socialist Republic) Stasys Baranauskas
- Dominykas Barauskas
- **Rolandas Baravykas**
- **Giedrius Barevičius**
- **Džiugas Bartkus**
- Markas Beneta
- Marius Bezykornovas
- **Algimantas Briaunys**
- **Motiejus Burba**
- **Rolandas Džiaukštas**
- Tautvydas Eliošius
- **Georgas Freidgeimas**
- Mantas Fridrikas
- (Lithuanian Soviet Socialist Republic) / (Lithuania) **Robertas Fridrikas**
- Andrius Gedgaudas
- **Edvinas Gertmonas**
- (Lithuanian Soviet Socialist Republic) Šenderis Giršovičius
- **Paulius Golubickas**
- **Tadas Gražiūnas**
- (Lithuanian Soviet Socialist Republic) / (Lithuania) **Valdas Ivanauskas**
- (Lithuanian Soviet Socialist Republic) **Sigitas Jakubauskas**
- **Algis Jankauskas**
- **Edgaras Jankauskas**
- (Lithuanian Soviet Socialist Republic) / (Lithuania) **Arvydas Janonis**
- **Karolis Jasaitis**
- **Artūras Jeršovas**
- **Andrius Jokšas**
- **Egidijus Juška**
- (Lithuanian Soviet Socialist Republic) / (Lithuania) Romualdas Juška
- Žydrūnas Karčemarskas
- Mindaugas Kalonas
- **Vytautas Karvelis**
- **Donatas Kazlauskas**
- **Kipras Kažukolovas**
- **Saulius Klevinskas**
- **Linas Klimavičius**
- **Mantas Kuklys**
- (Lithuanian Soviet Socialist Republic) Algirdas Kulikauskas
- (Lithuanian Soviet Socialist Republic) / (Lithuania) Gintaras Kvitkauskas
- **Tadas Labukas**
- (Lithuanian Soviet Socialist Republic) / (Lithuania) **Kęstutis Latoža**
- Justas Lasickas
- **Pavelas Leusas**
- **Vytautas Lukša**
- **Darius Maciulevičius**
- Mindaugas Malinauskas
- (Lithuanian Soviet Socialist Republic) / (Lithuania) **Valdemaras Martinkėnas**
- **Deivydas Matulevičius**
- **Giedrius Matulevičius**
- (Lithuanian Soviet Socialist Republic) / (Lithuania) **Romas Mažeikis**
- Darius Miceika
- **Saulius Mikoliūnas**
- **Tomas Mikuckis**
- Gražvydas Mikulėnas
- Valerijus Mižigurskis
- **Igoris Morinas**
- (Lithuanian Soviet Socialist Republic) / (Lithuania) **Arminas Narbekovas**
- **Arvydas Novikovas**
- **Sergejus Novikovas**
- Viktoras Olšanskis
- (Lithuanian Soviet Socialist Republic) / (Lithuania) Igoris Pankratjevas
- Nauris Petkevičius
- Vadimas Petrenko
- **Linas Pilibaitis**
- **Eimantas Poderis**
- **Robertas Poškus**
- **Aidas Preikšaitis**
- **Arūnas Pukelevičius**
- **Andrius Puotkalis**
- **Ramūnas Radavičius**
- **Nerijus Radžius**
- **Tomas Ražanauskas**
- **Robertas Ringys**
- **Daniel Romanovskij**
- (Lithuanian Soviet Socialist Republic) Kęstutis Ruzgys
- Darius Sanajevas
- **Dainius Saulėnas**
- **Aurelijus Skarbalius**
- **Andrius Skerla**
- Simonas Stankevičius
- (Lithuanian Soviet Socialist Republic) / (Lithuania) Gintaras Staučė
- **Artūras Steško**
- **Igoris Steško**
- **Ramūnas Stonkus**
- (Lithuanian Soviet Socialist Republic) / (Lithuania) **Vyacheslav Sukristov**
- **Deividas Šemberas**
- **Darvydas Šernas**
- **Deividas Šešplaukis**
- Ernestas Šetkus
- **Vaidotas Šilėnas**
- **Domantas Šimkus**
- **Dainius Šuliauskas**
- **Andrėjus Tereškinas**
- **Klaudijus Upstas**
- **Valdas Urbonas**
- Simonas Urbys
- **Karolis Uzėla**
- (Lithuanian Soviet Socialist Republic) Raimondas Vainoras
- **Egidijus Vaitkūnas**
- Nerijus Valskis
- Matas Vareika
- **Nerijus Vasiliauskas**
- Andrius Velička
- **Donatas Vencevičius**
- **Ovidijus Verbickas**
- **Raimondas Vilėniškis**
- Armantas Vitkauskas
- **Modestas Vorobjovas**
- **Ričardas Zdančius**
- (Lithuanian Soviet Socialist Republic) / (Lithuania) Benjaminas Zelkevičius
- Irmantas Zelmikas
- Marius Žaliūkas
- **Tomas Žiukas**
- **Artūras Žulpa**
- Audrius Žuta
- **Darius Žutautas**
- Tomas Žvirgždauskas

Africa

- (Cape Verde) Bryan Teixeira
- (Comoros) Kassim Hadji
- (Comoros) **Younn Zahary**
- (Ghana) Francis Kyeremeh
- (Ghana) Ebenezer Ofori
- (Mali) Mahamane Traoré
- (Nigeria) Ogenyi Onazi
- (Nigeria) Mathias Oyewusi
- (Senegal) Djibril Diaw
- (Senegal) Mamadou Mbodj
- (South Sudan) Machop Chol
- (Togo) Serge Nyuiadzi
- (Tunisia) Nassim Hnid

Americas

- (Argentina) Nicolás Gorobsov
- (Bolivia) Leonardo Vaca
- (Brazil) Renan Oliveira
- (Martinique) **Joris Moutachy**

European Union

- (Croatia) Mario Grgurović
- (Croatia) Tomislav Kiš
- (Croatia) Petar Mamić
- (Croatia) Andro Švrljuga
- (France) Hugo Vidémont
- (Latvia) Ēriks Pelcis
- (Poland) Kamil Biliński
- (Poland) Jakub Wilk
- (Romania) Liviu Antal
- (Scotland) Calum Elliot
- (Slovakia) Tomáš Malec
- (Slovakia) Jakub Sylvestr

Non-EU

- (Armenia) **Artak Yedigaryan**
- (Belarus) Yury Kendysh
- (Bosnia and Herzegovina) Armin Hodžić
- (Bosnia and Herzegovina) Semir Kerla
- (Iceland) Árni Vilhjálmsson
- (Kosovo) Erton Fejzullahu
- (Moldova) Iulian Bursuc
- (Russia) Pavel Komolov
- (Russia) Andrey Nagumanov
- (Serbia) Andrija Kaluđerović
- (Serbia) Nemanja Ljubisavljević
- (Serbia) Ivan Tatomirović

== Managerial history ==
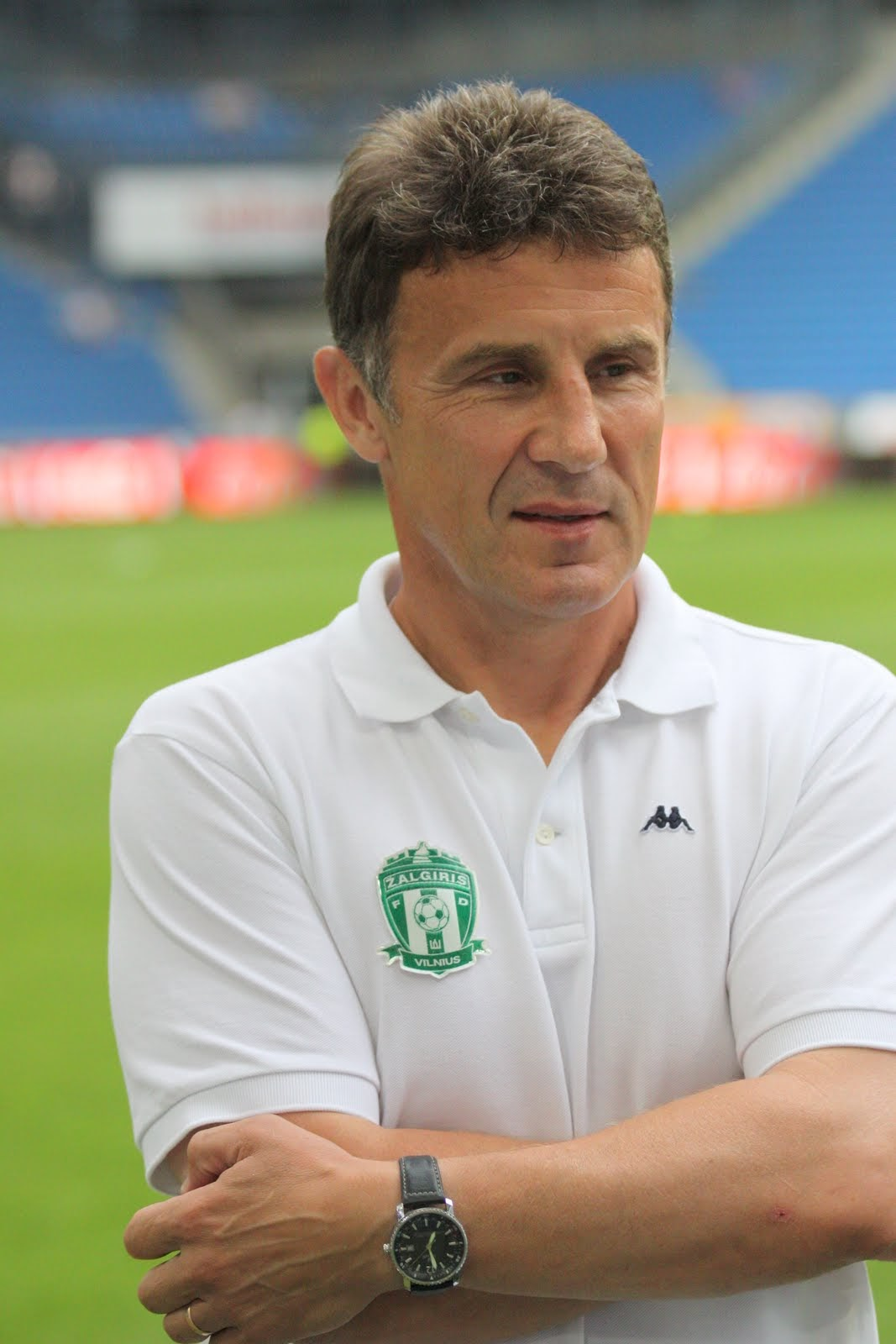
Marek Zub managed the team to 2013 and 2014 A Lyga championships

- (Lithuanian Soviet Socialist Republic) Voldemaras Jaškevičius (1947)
- (Lithuanian Soviet Socialist Republic) Jaroslavas Citavičius (1947–1948)
- (Soviet Union) Georgy Glazkov (1948–1951)
- (Soviet Union) Andrey Protasov (1951)
- (Soviet Union) Jurij Chodotov (1952–1953)
- (Lithuanian Soviet Socialist Republic) Stasys Paberžis (1953–1957)
- (Lithuanian Soviet Socialist Republic) Vytautas Saunoris (1958–1960)
- (Lithuanian Soviet Socialist Republic) Zenonas Ganusauskas (1961–1962)
- (Soviet Union) Serafim Kholodkov (1963–1965)
- (Lithuanian Soviet Socialist Republic) Juozas Vaškelis (1966–1967)
- (Lithuanian Soviet Socialist Republic) Algirdas Vosylius (1968–1971)
- (Soviet Union) Serafim Kholodkov (1971–1973)
- (Lithuanian Soviet Socialist Republic) Algirdas Klimkevičius (1974–1976)
- (Lithuanian Soviet Socialist Republic) Benjaminas Zelkevičius (1 January 1977 – 1 May 1983)
- (Lithuanian Soviet Socialist Republic) Algimantas Liubinskas (1 January 1983 – 31 December 1985)
- (Lithuanian Soviet Socialist Republic) / (Lithuania) Benjaminas Zelkevičius (1 April 1985 – 1 October 1991)
- (Lithuania) Vytautas Jančiauskas (1991–92)
- (Lithuania) Benjaminas Zelkevičius (1 October 1992 – 30 June 1995)
- (Lithuania) Eugenijus Riabovas (1996–2001)
- (Lithuania) Kęstutis Latoža (2002)
- (Lithuania) Eugenijus Riabovas (2003–2004)
- (Lithuania) Kęstutis Latoža (2004–2005)
- (Lithuania) Saulius Širmelis (1 January – 16 August 2005)
- (Lithuania) Viačeslavas Sukristovas (2005)
- (Lithuania) Igoris Pankratjevas (1 January – 11 October 2006)
- (Lithuania) Arminas Narbekovas (12 October 2006 – 8 November 2007)
- (Russia) Viatscheslav Mogilniy (11 November 2007 – 9 June 2008)
- (Lithuania) Mindaugas Čepas (10 June 2008–2009)
- (Lithuania) Igoris Pankratjevas (1 July 2009 – 31 December 2010)
- (Lithuania) Vitalijus Stankevičius (1 January – 31 December 2011)
- (Croatia) Damir Petravić (4 January – 8 August 2012)
- (Poland) Marek Zub (8 August 2012 – December 2014)
- (Lithuania) Valdas Dambrauskas (17 December 2014 – 23 October 2017)
- (Belarus) Aleksandr Brazevich (24 October – 24 November 2017)
- (Lithuania) Aurelijus Skarbalius (27 November 2017 – 22 June 2018)
- (Lithuania) Valdas Urbonas (23 June 2018 – 2 February 2019)
- (Poland) Marek Zub (13 February – 15 July 2019)
- (Portugal) João Luís Martins (15 July – 27 November 2019)
- (Belarus) Alyaksey Baha (19 January – 21 December 2020)
- (Kazakhstan) Vladimir Cheburin (11 January 2021 – 31 August 2025)
- (Lithuania) Rolandas Džiaukštas (2 September 2025 – 10 April 2026)
- (Lithuania) Andrius Skerla, (13 April 2026 – )

== See also ==
- FK Kauno Žalgiris
- FK Kauno Žalgiris (futsal)
