= Eimantas Poderis =

Lithuanian footballer

Personal information
- Date of birth: 13 September 1973 (age 53)
- Place of birth: Lithuania
- Height: 1.77 m (5 ft 9 1/2 in)
- Position: Forward

Senior career*
Years	Team	Apps	(Gls)
1991–1994	FK Žalgiris Vilnius	69	(26)
1995–1997	FK Inkaras Kaunas	53	(31)
1997	FC Alania Vladikavkaz	4	(0)
1997–1999	FK Inkaras Kaunas	21	(6)
1999–2000	Hakoah Ramat Gan		
2001–2003	Maccabi Herzliya		
2003	Sviesa Vilnius	19	(1)
2003–2005	FBK Kaunas	40	(6)
2006–2007	FK Žalgiris Vilnius	63	(12)
2009–2010	FK Tauras Tauragė	10	(0)

International career
1992–2005	Lithuania	22	(5)
- * Club domestic league appearances and goals

Eimantas Poderis (born 13 September 1973) is a Lithuanian former football forward. He obtained a total number of 21 caps for the Lithuania national football team, scoring five goals. Poderis also played as a professional in Russia and Israel during his career.

== Honours ==
National Team

- Baltic Cup
  - 1992
  - 2005
