= Romas Mažeikis =

Lithuanian footballer

Personal information
- Full name: Romas Vytautas Mažeikis
- Date of birth: 28 April 1964 (age 62)
- Place of birth: Gargždai, Lithuanian SSR, Soviet Union
- Height: 1.84 m (6 ft 1/2 in)
- Position: Defender

Senior career*
| Years | Team | Apps | (Gls) |
| 1982–1990 | Žalgiris Vilnius | 159 | (0) |
| 1990 | Guria Lanchkhuti | 23 | (0) |
| 1991 | Lokomotiv Moscow | 24 | (0) |
| 1991–1992 | Kremser SC | | |
| 1992 | Antsi Tbilisi | | |
| 1993 | Panerys Vilnius | | |
| 1993–2000 | VfB Lübeck | 138 | (4) |

International career
| 1990–1994 | Lithuania | 19 | (0) |
- * Club domestic league appearances and goals

Romas Mažeikis (born 28 April 1964) is a retired Lithuanian international footballer who played as a defender for clubs in the Soviet Union, Austria and Germany.

== Club career ==
Born in Gargždai, Mažeikis began playing professional football for FK Žalgiris Vilnius in the Soviet First League. Žalgiris won the league in 1982, and he would spend the next seven seasons playing for the club appearing in 159 Soviet Top League matches. When Žalgiris left the Soviet league in 1990, he joined Georgian side FC Guria Lanchkhuti for the remainder of the season.

Mažeikis returned to the Soviet Top League with FC Lokomotiv Moscow the following season, appearing in 24 matches as the club finished in last place. After relegation, he left for Austrian side Kremser SC. He also had brief spells with Georgian side FC Antsi Tbilisi and Lithuanian side FK Panerys Vilnius.

In July 1993, Mažeikis moved to Germany where he would finish his career with VfB Lübeck.

== International career ==
Mažeikis made 19 appearances for the Lithuania national football team from 1990 to 1994.
