= Arvydas Janonis =

Lithuanian footballer

Personal information
- Full name: Arvydas Janonis
- Date of birth: 6 November 1960 (age 65)
- Place of birth: Kėdainiai, Lithuania
- Position: Defender

Senior career*
| Years | Team | Apps | (Gls) |
| 1978–1990 | FK Žalgiris Vilnius | | |
| 1990–1991 | FC Lokomotiv Moscow | | |
| 1991–1994 | SKN St. Pölten | | |
| 1994–1995 | Wiener Sport-Club | | |
| 1995–1997 | SV Gerasdorf | | |
| 1997–2000 | SV Wurmla | | |

International career
| 1988 | Soviet Union Olympic | 2 | (0) |
- Soviet Union Universiade
| | Lithuania | 3 | |
Medal record
| Gold medal – first place | 1988 Summer Olympics – Football |
| Gold medal – first place | 1987 Summer Universiade – Football |
- * Club domestic league appearances and goals

Olympic medal record

Representing the Soviet Union

Men's football
| Gold medal – first place | 1988 Seoul | Team |

Arvydas Janonis (born 6 November 1960, in Kėdainiai) is a former Lithuanian footballer.

Janonis played as a defender from 1978 until 1990 for FK Žalgiris Vilnius. The 1990/91 season he was part of the FC Lokomotiv Moscow squad. In 1991, he moved to Austria where he played for SKN St. Pölten (1991–1994), Wiener Sport-Club (1994–1995), SV Gerasdorf (1995–1997) and SV Wurmla (1997–2000).

He represented the Soviet Union at the 1987 Summer Universiade and the 1988 Olympics (2 games), both won by the Soviet team. He also capped three times for the Lithuanian soccer team.
