= Kęstutis Ruzgys =

Lithuanian footballer

Personal information
- Full name: Kęstutis Ruzgys
- Date of birth: 15 September 1962 (age 64)
- Place of birth: Klaipėda, Lithuanian SSR, Soviet Union
- Height: 1.81 m (5 ft 11 1/2 in)
- Position: Forward

Senior career*
Years	Team	Apps	(Gls)
1982–1986	Granitas Klaipėda	129	(37)
1986–1987	Žalgiris Vilnius	27	(3)
1988–1989	Granitas Klaipėda	64	(28)
1990	Sirijus Klaipėda		
1991	Pārdaugava Rīga	21	(6)
1991–1992	OFK Belgrade	11	(2)
1993–1994	VfR Sölde		
1994–1995	Sportfreunde Siegen		

International career
1992	Lithuania	3	(0)
- * Club domestic league appearances and goals

Kęstutis Ruzgys (born 15 September 1962) is a retired Lithuanian football forward who played in Soviet Union, Baltic states, Yugoslavia and Germany during his professional career.

Ruzgys was born in Klaipėda. He played with FK Žalgiris Vilnius in the Soviet First League in addition to OFK Beograd in the Yugoslav First League. He won a total of three caps for the Lithuania national team, scoring no goals, while playing in Serbia as a professional for OFK Beograd. He ended his career playing in Germany with Sportfreunde Siegen.

His son Manfredas Ruzgis, born in 1997, is also a footballer, and debuted for Lithuania in 2016 aged 19.

== Honours ==
- Granitas Klaipėda
  - Lithuanian Championship: 1984
  - Lithuanian Cup: 1983 and 1986
- Sirijus Klaipėda
  - Lithuanian Championship: 1990
  - Lithuanian Cup: 1990
- National Team
  - Baltic Cup: 1992
