= Arminas Narbekovas =

Lithuanian footballer (born 1965)

Personal information
- Full name: Arminas Narbekovas
- Date of birth: 28 January 1965 (age 61)
- Place of birth: Gargždai, Lithuanian SSR, Soviet Union
- Height: 1.75 m (5 ft 9 in)
- Position: Attacking midfielder

Senior career*
Years	Team	Apps	(Gls)
1983–1990	Žalgiris Vilnius	155	(51)
1990	Lokomotiv Moscow	14	(2)
1990–1996	Austria Wien	115	(32)
1996–1998	VfB Admira Wacker Mödling	50	(9)
1998–1999	FCN St. Pölten		
1999–2000	VfB Admira Wacker Mödling	20	(4)
2000–2001	SV Hundsheim		
2001–2003	Wiener SK	11	(0)
2003–2004	White Star Brigittenau	11	(2)
2004–2005	SV Weikersdorf	23	(9)

International career
1988	Soviet Union Olympic	7	(2)
1990–2001	Lithuania	13	(4)

Managerial career
- 2004–2005: SV Weikersdorf
- 2006–2007: Žalgiris Vilnius
- 2007–2009: SV Donau Langlebarn
- 2009–2012: FK Banga Gargždai
- 2010–2012: Lithuania (assistant coach)
- 2012: FK Spartaks Jūrmala
- 2013–2015: Lithuania U-21
Medal record
Men's football
Gold medal – first place	1988 Seoul	Team
- * Club domestic league appearances and goals

Arminas Narbekovas (born 28 January 1965 in Gargždai) is a former Lithuanian footballer who played as a midfielder. In 2003, he was selected by UEFA as his country's Golden Player, the greatest player of the past 50 years.

== Personal life ==
Arminas Narbekovas was born to a Tatar father Andrey Narbekov and a Lithuanian mother.

== Career ==
Narbekovas made his debut in 1983 with Žalgiris Vilnius, Lithuania's sole representative in the Soviet Top League, at the age of 18. In 1987, he finished second in league scoring with 16 goals while leading his club to a third-place finish, their best in history. Zalgiris would then participate in the UEFA Cup for the first time, losing to Austria Vienna. Austria would become Narbekovas' destination after Lithuanian players were allowed to move abroad. Arminas moved there in 1990 after a short stint with Lokomotiv Moscow, since Lithuania was not a part of UEFA yet and players from its clubs were not permitted to transfer. Narbekovas would spend the rest of his club career in Austria, with Austria Vienna until 1995 and then with Admira Wacker and a number of other lower division clubs.

== International career ==
Although he never received a FIFA-sanctioned cap for the USSR national team, he did play for them, and win the gold medal, at the 1988 Summer Olympics. Narbekovas scored two goals in the tournament, including an extra time one in the semifinals against Italy, helping the Soviets to a 3–2 victory. Also, he represented USSR in 1987 Summer Universiade. Arminas first played for Lithuania in its first ever game as a newly independent country, on 27 May 1990 against Georgia, and scored the first goal in the 2–2 tie. Unfortunately, injuries limited his career to just 13 caps and four goals for his country.

== Honours ==
=== Club ===
Austria Wien

- Austrian Football Bundesliga (3): 1990–91, 1991–92, 1992–93
- Austrian Cup (2): 1991–92, 1993–94

=== International ===
- Summer Olympic Games
  - Gold medal: 1988
- Universiade
  - Gold medal: 1987

=== Individual ===
- Lithuanian Player of the Year: 1985, 1986, 1987, 1988
- UEFA Jubilee Awards Lithuanian Golden Player representative
- Summer Universiade: 1987 top scorer

== International goals ==
=== Lithuania ===
#	Date	Venue	Opponent	Score	Result	Competition
1	27 May 1990	Dinamo Stadium, Tbilisi, Georgia	(Georgian Soviet Socialist Republic) Georgia	2–2	Draw	Friendly
2	28 April 1992	Windsor Park, Belfast, Northern Ireland	Northern Ireland	2–2	Draw	1994 World Cup qualifier
3	25 May 1994	Bazaly Stadium, Ostrava, Czech Republic	Czech Republic	5–3	Loss	Friendly
4	9 October 1996	Žalgiris Stadium, Vilnius, Lithuania	Liechtenstein	2–1	Win	1998 World Cup qualifier
Correct as of 1 December 2014

=== Soviet Union Olympic team ===
#	Date	Venue	Opponent	Score	Result	Competition
1	22 September 1988	Seoul	United States	2–0	4–2	Football at the 1988 Summer Olympics
2	27 September 1988	Seoul	Italy	2–1	3–2	Football at the 1988 Summer Olympics

== Honours ==
Narbekovas was named Lithuania's footballer of the year four times, from 1985 to 1988. In November 2003, to celebrate UEFA's jubilee, he was selected by the Lithuanian Football Federation as the country's Golden Player – the greatest player of the last 50 years.
