= Sigitas Jakubauskas =

Soviet-Lithuanian footballer

Personal information
- Full name: Sigitas Jakubauskas
- Date of birth: 29 December 1958 (age 67)
- Place of birth: Kaunas, Lithuanian SSR, Soviet Union
- Height: 1.79 m (5 ft 10 1/2 in)
- Positions: Defender; striker

Senior career*
Years	Team	Apps	(Gls)
1978–1989	FK Žalgiris Vilnius	350	(80)
1991–1993	FC Remscheid	45	(6)

International career
1985	USSR	1	(0)
- * Club domestic league appearances and goals

Sigitas Jakubauskas (born 29 December 1958 in Kaunas) is a retired Soviet and Lithuanian football player.

== International career ==
Jakubauskas played his only game for USSR on 7 August 1985 in a friendly against Romania.

== Honours ==
- Lithuanian Footballer of the Year: 1982
