= Igoris Pankratjevas =

Lithuanian football coach and former player

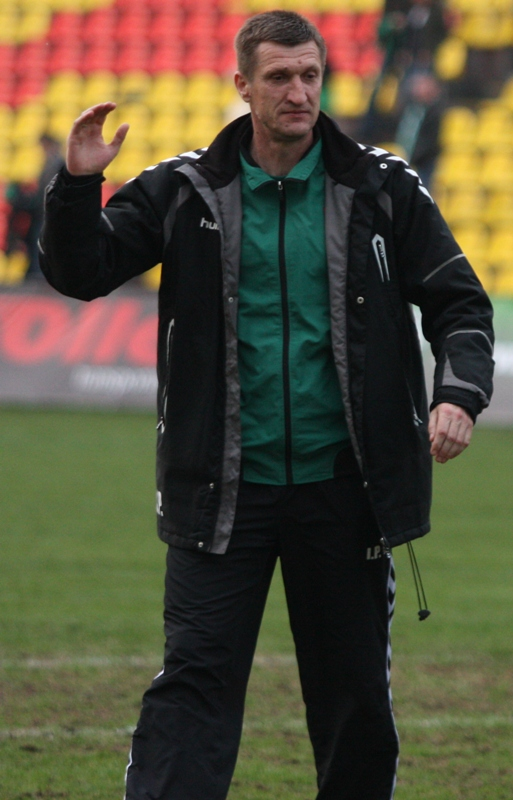
- A Lithuanian professional football coach and a former player

Personal information
- Date of birth: 9 August 1964 (age 62)
- Place of birth: Kaunas, Lithuanian SSR, Soviet Union
- Height: 1.93 m (6 ft 4 in)
- Positions: Defender; midfielder

Senior career*
Years	Team	Apps	(Gls)
1982–1989	FK Žalgiris Vilnius	125	(17)
1990	Westfalia Herne		
1990–1991	KSV Hessen Kassel	2	(0)
1991	FC Dynamo Moscow	2	(0)
1992	Lietuvos Makabi Vilnius	6	(1)
1992	FC Dynamo Kyiv	9	(2)
1993	FC Nyva Myronivka	10	(1)
1993–1994	FK Sakalas Siauliai	3	(0)
1994–1995	FC Zorya Luhansk	11	(0)
1995–1996	FC Podillya Khmelnytskyi	21	(0)
1996–1997	FC Nyva Ternopil	17	(2)
1997–1998	FC Zorya Luhansk	18	(0)

International career
1992–1994	Lithuania	4	(0)

Managerial career
- 1999–2003: FK Inkaras
- 2003–2005: FK Atlantas
- 2005: FBK Kaunas
- 2006: FK Žalgiris Vilnius
- 2007: Lithuania U-21
- 2008: FK Suduva Marijampole
- 2009: FK Standard Sumgayit (assistant coach)
- 2010: FK Žalgiris Vilnius
- 2011: FBK Kaunas (director of sport)
- 2012–2013: Lithuania (assistant coach)
- 2013: Lithuania (caretaker)
- 2014–2015: Lithuania
- 2017: Panerys
- 2017-2018: Atlantas
- 2023-: FM Fortūna
- * Club domestic league appearances and goals

Igoris Pankratjevas (born 9 August 1964) is a Lithuanian professional football coach and a former player. He made his debut in the Soviet Top League in 1983 for FK Žalgiris Vilnius.

Igoris Pankratjevas coached several top Lithuanian football clubs. In 2010 season he was voted best coach of the year after winning bronze medals with a promoted FK Žalgiris Vilnius side. Appointed Lithuania assistant coach in March 2012, before taking over as caretaker in September 2013 and then giving a permanent head coach role on 21 December 2013. He then resigned as Lithuania head coach after a 0–3 loss to England on 12 October 2015.

== Honours ==
=== Player ===
- Soviet First League (second tier) gold: 1982
- Soviet Top League bronze: 1987
- Lithuanian LFF CUP winner: 1992
- Ukrainian Premier League runner-up: 1992
- Ukrainian Premier League champion: 1993

=== Coach ===
- Lithuanian A League bronze: 2003 (FK Atlantas)
- Lithuanian LFF Cup winner: 2003 (FK Atlantas)
- Lithuanian A League silver: 2005 (FBK Kaunas)
- Lithuanian LFF Cup winner: 2005 (FBK Kaunas)
- Lithuanian A League bronze: 2010 (VMFD Žalgiris)
- Best Coach of the year: 2010

== European club competitions(as a player) ==
- UEFA Cup 1988–89 with FK Žalgiris Vilnius: 2 games
- UEFA Cup 1991–92 with FC Dynamo Moscow: 3 games

== European club competitions(as a coach) ==
2004–05 Spartak Moskva – FK Atlantas 2 – 0 Intertoto / 1st round

2004–05 FK Atlantas – Spartak Moskva 1 – 0 Intertoto / 1st round

2008–09 FK Suduva – TNS 1–0 UEFA Cup / 1st round

2008–09 TNS – FK Suduva 0–1 UEFA Cup / 1st round

2008–09 FK Suduva – Red Bull Salzburg 1–4 UEFA Cup / 2nd round

2008–09 Red Bull Salzburg – FK Suduva UEFA Cup 0–1 / 2nd round

== Managerial statistics ==
As of 12 October 2015

Team	Nat	From	To	Record				
Team	Nat	From	To	G	W	D	L	Win %
Lithuania	(Lithuania)	July 2013	October 2015	25	6	6	13	24.00
Total				25	6	6	13	24.00
