= Stasys Baranauskas =

Lithuanian footballer (1962–2026)

Personal information
- Date of birth: 7 May 1962
- Place of birth: Kaunas, Lithuanian SSR, USSR
- Date of death: 7 February 2026 (aged 63)
- Height: 1.80 m (5 ft 11 in)
- Position: Midfielder

Senior career*
Years	Team	Apps	(Gls)
1978–1980	FK Ekranas		
1980–1989	Žalgiris Vilnius	253	(57)
1989–1991	Hapoel Petah Tikva	13	(1)
1991	Austria Klagenfurt	20	(7)
1992	Favoritner AC	12	(4)
1992–1994	First Vienna FC	45	(3)
1994–1995	SV Gerasdorf	23	(7)
1995	Ekranas Panevėžys	5	(0)
1996	Sakalas Šiauliai	13	(1)
1996–1997	Kareda Siauliai	28	(3)
1998–1999	Panerys Vilnius	28	(2)

International career
1986–1988	Soviet Union (Olympic)	2	(2)
1992–1993	Lithuania	14	(1)
- * Club domestic league appearances and goals

Stasys Baranauskas (7 May 1962 – 7 February 2026) was a Lithuanian footballer who played as a midfielder. He obtained 14 caps for the Lithuania national team, scoring one goal. Baranauskas died on 7 February 2026, at the age of 63.
