= Benjaminas Zelkevičius =

Lithuanian footballer (1944–2026)

Personal information
- Date of birth: 6 February 1944
- Place of birth: Kaunas, Reichskommissariat Ostland
- Date of death: 12 January 2026 (aged 81)
- Place of death: Vilnius, Lithuania
- Height: 1.83 m (6 ft 0 in)
- Position: Striker

Youth career
- Banga Kaunas

Senior career*
Years	Team	Apps	(Gls)
1961–1962	Banga Kaunas	18	(2)
1963–1967	Žalgiris Vilnius	150	(23)
1968	Shakhtar Donetsk	19	(3)
1969–1973	Žalgiris Vilnius	181	(27)
1973–1975	Pažanga Vilnius		

Managerial career
- 1973–1977: Šviesa (assistant)
- 1977–1983: Žalgiris Vilnius
- 1983–1985: ShVSM Vilnius
- 1985–1991: Žalgiris Vilnius
- 1990–1991: Lithuania
- 1992: Austria Wien (assistant)
- 1992–1996: Žalgiris Vilnius
- 1995–1997: Lithuania
- 1997: KAMAZ-Chally
- 1997–1998: Metallurg Lipetsk
- 1998: Rotor Volgograd (assistant)
- 1999: Shinnik Yaroslavl
- 2000: Baltika Kaliningrad (consultant)
- 2001–2003: Lithuania
- 2002–2003: Baltika Kaliningrad
- 2004–2007: Liepājas Metalurgs
- 2009: Luch-Energiya Vladivostok
- 2009–2010: FM Ateitis (youth)
- 2019–?: FM Ateitis (technical director)
- * Club domestic league appearances and goals

Benjaminas Zelkevičius (6 February 1944 – 12 January 2026) was a Lithuanian football coach and player. He was the manager of the Lithuania national team on three occasions – from 1990 to 1991, 1995 to 1997, and 2001 to 2002. He played as a striker, making 331 appearances and scoring 50 goals for Žalgiris Vilnius.

Zelkevičius coached Žalgiris Vilnius and Russian club Baltika Kaliningrad. During his playing career, he played for Shakhtar Donetsk in the Soviet Top League and for Žalgiris Vilnius in the Soviet First League.

== Post-managing career ==
From September 2009 through 2010 Zelkevičius coached at FM Ateitis youth academy. On 12 August 2019, he became Ateitis' technical director.

From 2015, Zelkevičius was chair of the Lithuanian Football Coaches Council.

Zelkevičius died in Vilnius on 12 January 2026, at the age of 81.

== Honours ==
=== Manager ===
Lithuania

- Baltic Cup: 1991

Liepajas Metalurgs

- Latvian Higher League: 2005
