= Virginijus Baltušnikas =

Lithuanian footballer

Personal information
- Date of birth: 22 January 1968 (age 58)
- Place of birth: Panevėžys, Lithuanian SSR, Soviet Union
- Height: 1.88 m (6 ft 2 in)
- Position: Defender

Senior career*
Years	Team	Apps	(Gls)
1985–1995	FK Žalgiris Vilnius	39	(3)
1991	→ FC Pakhtakor Tashkent (loan)	3	(0)
1993–1994	→ 1. FC Magdeburg (loan)	26	(3)
1996–1997	FC Lokomotiv Nizhny Novgorod	41	(0)
1997–1998	FK Žalgiris Vilnius	16	(1)
1999–2001	FK Ekranas	21	(2)
Total		146	(9)

International career
1990–1997	Lithuania	42	(9)
- * Club domestic league appearances and goals

Virginijus Baltušnikas (born 22 October 1968 in Panevėžys) is a retired Lithuanian professional football player who played for FK Žalgiris Vilnius in the Soviet Top League and Lithuanian A Lyga as well as FC Lokomotiv Nizhny Novgorod the Russian Premier League.

Baltušnikas made 42 appearances for the Lithuania national football team, scoring nine goals.

== Honours ==
Lithuania

- Baltic Cup: 1992
