= Darius Sanajevas =

Lithuanian footballer

Personal information
- Date of birth: 14 February 1977 (age 49)
- Place of birth: Kaunas, Lithuanian SSR
- Height: 1.89 m (6 ft 2 1/2 in)
- Position: Defender

Senior career*
Years	Team	Apps	(Gls)
1993–1994	FBK Kaunas	1	(0)
1994–1998	FK Inkaras Kaunas	64	(5)
1998	FC Alania Vladikavkaz	6	(0)
1998–1999	FK Inkaras Kaunas	11	(3)
1999	FC Žalgiris	3	(0)
2000	FK Kareda Kaunas	23	(2)
2001–2005	FBK Kaunas	111	(8)
2006	Kauno Jėgeriai		
2007–2008	FBK Kaunas	10	(0)
2008	FK Šilutė	16	(0)

International career
1996–2003	Lithuania	6	(0)
- * Club domestic league appearances and goals

Darius Sanajevas (born 14 February 1977 in Kaunas) is a former Lithuanian footballer.

Sanajevas has made six appearances for the Lithuania national football team.

== Honours ==
Inkaras Kaunas

- A Lyga runner-up: 1994–95, 1995–96
- A Lyga bronze: 1996–97
- Lithuanian Football Cup winner: 1995
- Lithuanian Football Cup runner-up: 1996, 1997

Žalgiris Vilnius

- A Lyga runner-up: 1999

FBK Kaunas

- A Lyga champion: 2000, 2001, 2002, 2003, 2004, 2007
- A Lyga runner-up: 2005
- Lithuanian Football Cup winner: 2002, 2004, 2005, 2008
