= 2002 Commonwealth of Independent States Cup =

CIS Cup, Кубок Содружества 2002

Tournament details
- Host country: Russia
- Dates: 19–27 January 2002
- Teams: 16
- Venues: 2 (in 1 host city)

Final positions
- Champions: (Ukraine) Dynamo Kyiv (4th title)

Tournament statistics
- Matches played: 31
- Goals scored: 107 (3.45 per match)
- Top scorer(s): (Russia) Vladimir Beschastnykh (7 goals)

The 2002 Commonwealth of Independent States Cup was the tenth edition of the competition between the champions of former republics of Soviet Union. It was won by Dynamo Kyiv for the fourth time overall (first since 1998). After three seasons played with two divisions, the tournament was reverted to the previous format (used from 1996 till 1998).

== Participants ==
Team	Qualification	Participation
(Russia) Spartak Moscow	2001 Russian Top Division champions	9th
(Ukraine) Dynamo Kyiv	2000–01 Vyshcha Liha champions	7th
(Belarus) Belshina Bobruisk	2001 Belarusian Premier League champions	1st
(Lithuania) FBK Kaunas	2001 A Lyga champions	4th
(Latvia) Skonto Riga	2001 Latvian Higher League champions	10th
(Estonia) Flora Tallinn	2001 Meistriliiga champions	3rd
(Moldova) Sheriff Tiraspol	2000–01 Moldovan National Division champions	1st
(Georgia (country)) Torpedo Kutaisi	2000–01 Umaglesi Liga champions	2nd
(Armenia) Pyunik Yerevan	2001 Armenian Premier League champions	3rd
(Azerbaijan) Shamkir	2000–01 Azerbaijan Top League champions	2nd
(Kazakhstan) Zhenis Astana	2001 Kazakhstan Premier League champions	2nd
(Uzbekistan) Neftchi Fergana	2001 Uzbek League champions	3rd
(Tajikistan) Regar-TadAZ Tursunzoda	2001 Tajik League champions	2nd
(Turkmenistan) Nisa Aşgabat	2001 Ýokary Liga champions	2nd
(Kyrgyzstan) SKA-PVO Bishkek	2001 Kyrgyzstan League champions	3rd
Russia U19	Unofficial entry, not eligible to advance past group stage	3rd

== Group stage ==
=== Group A ===
Team	Pld	W	D	L	GF	GA	GD	Pts
(Russia) Spartak Moscow	3	3	0	0	15	3	+12	9
(Moldova) Sheriff Tiraspol	3	2	0	1	8	8	0	6
(Armenia) Pyunik Yerevan	3	1	0	2	5	9	−4	3
(Uzbekistan) Neftchi Fergana	3	0	0	3	2	10	−8	0

==== Results ====
19 January 2002
19:00

Spartak Moscow (Russia)	3 – 0	(Uzbekistan) Neftchi Fergana
Beschastnykh 7', 48'; Sychev 72'

Olympic Sport Complex, Moscow
Attendance: 10,000
Referee: Serhiy Shebek (Ukraine)
19 January 2002
19:00

Sheriff Tiraspol (Moldova)	3 – 0	(Armenia) Pyunik Yerevan
Priganiuc 30'; Pațula 44'; Jacob 90'

Spartak Manege, Moscow
Attendance: 400
Referee: Sten Kaldma (Estonia)

20 January 2002
19:00

Spartak Moscow (Russia)	6 – 1	(Moldova) Sheriff Tiraspol
Beschastnykh 2', 32'; Vasilyuk 16'; Sychev 60'; Kudryashov 61'; Mukansi 79'		Ivanov 39'

Olympic Sport Complex, Moscow
Attendance: 10,000
Referee: Sergey Shmolik (Belarus)
20 January 2002
19:00

Pyunik Yerevan (Armenia)	3 – 0	(Uzbekistan) Neftchi Fergana
N'Diaye 43'; Avetisyan 48', 75'

Spartak Manege, Moscow
Attendance: 300
Referee: Andrejs Sipailo (Latvia)

22 January 2002
19:00

Pyunik Yerevan (Armenia)	2 – 6	(Russia) Spartak Moscow
Karamyan 18'; N'Diaye 43'		Danishevsky 23', 26', 55', 81'; Sychev 34'; Beschastnykh 84'

Olympic Sport Complex, Moscow
Attendance: 5,000
Referee: Viktor Kolpakov (Kyrgyzstan)
22 January 2002
19:00

Sheriff Tiraspol (Moldova)	4 – 2	(Uzbekistan) Neftchi Fergana
Barburoș 13', 68', 77'; Ivanov 28'		Kovalenko 37'; Ni 40'

Spartak Manege, Moscow
Attendance: 200
Referee: Asim Khudiev (Azerbaijan)

=== Group B ===
- Unofficial table

Team	Pld	W	D	L	GF	GA	GD	Pts
(Latvia) Skonto Riga	3	3	0	0	7	0	+7	9
(Georgia (country)) Torpedo Kutaisi	3	2	0	1	5	5	0	6
Russia U19	3	1	0	2	5	7	−2	3
(Kazakhstan) Zhenis Astana	3	0	0	3	3	8	−5	0

- Official table

Team	Pld	W	D	L	GF	GA	GD	Pts
(Latvia) Skonto Riga	2	2	0	0	5	0	+5	6
(Georgia (country)) Torpedo Kutaisi	2	1	0	1	2	4	−2	3
(Kazakhstan) Zhenis Astana	2	0	0	2	1	4	−3	0

==== Results ====
19 January 2002
15:00

Skonto Riga (Latvia)	2 – 0	(Kazakhstan) Zhenis Astana
Kšanavičius 6'; Chaladze 7'

Olympic Sport Complex, Moscow
Attendance: 3,000
Referee: Valentin Ivanov (Russia)
19 January 2002
15:00

Russia U19	1 – 3	(Georgia (country)) Torpedo Kutaisi
Pugachev 72'		Didava 17'; Asatiani 24'; Ionanidze 54'

Spartak Manege, Moscow
Attendance: 700
Referee: Ghenadie Orlic (Moldova)

20 January 2002
15:00

Torpedo Kutaisi (Georgia (country))	0 – 3	(Latvia) Skonto Riga
		Menteshashvili 58'; Verpakovskis 87'; Jeļisejevs 89'

Olympic Sport Complex, Moscow
Attendance: 2,000
Referee: Dmitriy Roman (Uzbekistan)
20 January 2002
15:00

Zhenis Astana (Kazakhstan)	2 – 4	Russia U19
Tlekhugov 90', 90'		Malakhovskiy 9', 57'; Bystrov 69'; Zhitnikov 78'

Spartak Manege, Moscow
Attendance: 500
Referee: Rahmon Murtazayev (Tajikistan)

22 January 2002
15:00

Torpedo Kutaisi (Georgia (country))	2 – 1	(Kazakhstan) Zhenis Astana
Ionanidze 44'; Poroshyn 88'		Mendes 85'

Olympic Sport Complex, Moscow
Attendance: 1,200
Referee: Sten Kaldma (Estonia)
22 January 2002
15:00

Skonto Riga (Latvia)	2 – 0	Russia U19
Verpakovskis 6'; Buitkus 73'

Spartak Manege, Moscow
Attendance: 500
Referee: Rahmon Murtazayev (Tajikistan)

=== Group C ===
Team	Pld	W	D	L	GF	GA	GD	Pts
(Ukraine) Dynamo Kyiv	3	3	0	0	7	1	+6	9
(Lithuania) FBK Kaunas	3	1	1	1	2	2	0	4
(Tajikistan) Regar-TadAZ Tursunzoda	3	1	0	2	3	4	−1	3
(Azerbaijan) Shamkir	3	0	1	2	1	6	−5	1

==== Results ====
19 January 2002
17:00

Dynamo Kyiv (Ukraine)	2 – 1	(Lithuania) FBK Kaunas
Idahor 49'; Vashchuk 83'		Sanajevas 25'

Olympic Sport Complex, Moscow
Attendance: 6,000
Referee: Karen Nalbandyan (Armenia)
19 January 2002
17:00

Shamkir (Azerbaijan)	1 – 3	(Tajikistan) Regar-TadAZ Tursunzoda
Bəhramov 20'		Bozorov 25'; Mukhamadiev 47'; Idiyev 86'

Spartak Manege, Moscow
Attendance: 650
Referee: Bagdat Tuseev (Kazakhstan)

20 January 2002
17:00

Dynamo Kyiv (Ukraine)	3 – 0	(Azerbaijan) Shamkir
Bodnár 15'; Khatskevich 40'; Gavrančić 53'

Olympic Sport Complex, Moscow
Attendance: 5,000
Referee: Yuri Baskakov (Russia)
20 January 2002
17:00

FBK Kaunas (Lithuania)	1 – 0	(Tajikistan) Regar-TadAZ Tursunzoda
Velička 20'

Spartak Manege, Moscow
Attendance: 500
Referee: Viktor Kolpakov (Kyrgyzstan)

22 January 2002
17:00

Regar-TadAZ Tursunzoda (Tajikistan)	0 – 2	(Ukraine) Dynamo Kyiv
		Cernat 31'; Idahor 73'

Olympic Sport Complex, Moscow
Attendance: 1,000
Referee: Valentin Ivanov (Russia)
22 January 2002
17:00

Shamkir (Azerbaijan)	0 – 0	(Lithuania) FBK Kaunas

Spartak Manege, Moscow
Attendance: 250
Referee: Dmitriy Roman (Uzbekistan)

=== Group D ===
Team	Pld	W	D	L	GF	GA	GD	Pts
(Estonia) Flora Tallinn	3	2	1	0	5	2	+3	7
(Turkmenistan) Nisa Aşgabat	3	2	0	1	5	2	+3	6
(Kyrgyzstan) SKA-PVO Bishkek	3	0	2	1	2	5	−3	2
(Belarus) Belshina Bobruisk	3	0	1	2	3	6	−3	1

==== Results ====
19 January 2002
13:00

Belshina Bobruisk (Belarus)	1 – 3	(Estonia) Flora Tallinn
Aleshchenko 89'		Kristal 13'; Švets 54', 67'

Olympic Sport Complex, Moscow
Attendance: 500
Referee: Yuri Baskakov (Russia)
19 January 2002
13:00

SKA-PVO Bishkek (Kyrgyzstan)	0 – 3	(Turkmenistan) Nisa Aşgabat
		Did.Urazow 18', 73' (pen.); Nazarow 83'

Spartak Manege, Moscow
Attendance: 400
Referee: Paulius Malžinskas (Lithuania)

20 January 2002
13:00

Nisa Aşgabat (Turkmenistan)	2 – 1	(Belarus) Belshina Bobruisk
Did.Urazow 28'; W.Baýramow 68'		Gormash 83'

Olympic Sport Complex, Moscow
Attendance: 500
Referee: Asim Khudiev (Azerbaijan)
20 January 2002
13:00

Flora Tallinn (Estonia)	1 – 1	(Kyrgyzstan) SKA-PVO Bishkek
Saharov 54'		Pryanishnikov 89'

Spartak Manege, Moscow
Attendance: 300
Referee: Merab Malaguradze (Georgia)

22 January 2002
13:00

Belshina Bobruisk (Belarus)	1 – 1	(Kyrgyzstan) SKA-PVO Bishkek
Harbachow 88'		Gaizitdinov 83'

Olympic Sport Complex, Moscow
Attendance: 500
Referee: Andrejs Sipailo (Latvia)
22 January 2002
13:00

Flora Tallinn (Estonia)	1 – 0	(Turkmenistan) Nisa Aşgabat
Hamre 43'

Spartak Manege, Moscow
Attendance: 200
Referee: Ghenadie Orlic (Moldova)

== Final rounds ==
Quarter-finals (23 Jan)
(Russia)	Spartak Moscow	3
(Georgia (country))	Torpedo Kutaisi	1
(Estonia)	Flora Tallinn	0
(Lithuania)	FBK Kaunas (p)	0
(Latvia)	Skonto Riga	4
(Moldova)	Sheriff Tiraspol	2
(Ukraine)	Dynamo Kyiv	3
(Turkmenistan)	Nisa Aşgabat	2

Semi-finals (25 Jan)
(Russia)	Spartak Moscow	4
(Lithuania)	FBK Kaunas	0
(Latvia)	Skonto Riga	0
(Ukraine)	Dynamo Kyiv	3

Final (27 Jan)
(Russia)	Spartak Moscow	3
(Ukraine)	Dynamo Kyiv	4

=== Quarterfinals ===
23 January 2002
13:00

Flora Tallinn (Estonia)	0 – 0	(Lithuania) FBK Kaunas
Penalties
Rooba (penalty missed); Kristal (penalty missed); Rähn (penalty missed); Saviauk (penalty scored)	1 – 3	(penalty scored) Daniličevas; (penalty missed) Gvildys; (penalty scored) Puotkalis; (penalty missed) Kurskis; (penalty scored) Miklinevičius

Olympic Sport Complex, Moscow
Attendance: 200
Referee: Serhiy Shebek (Ukraine)
23 January 2002
15:00

Skonto Riga (Latvia)	4 – 2	(Moldova) Sheriff Tiraspol
Blagonadeždins 12'; Koļesņičenko 47'; Verpakovskis 86'; Jeļisejevs 90'		Odiah 57'; Ivanov 65'

Olympic Sport Complex, Moscow
Attendance: 2,000
Referee: Yuri Baskakov (Russia)
23 January 2002
17:00

Dynamo Kyiv (Ukraine)	3 – 2	(Turkmenistan) Nisa Aşgabat
Peev 10'; Cernat 44' (pen.); Husin 87'		Did.Urazow 17' (pen.); W.Baýramow 35'

Olympic Sport Complex, Moscow
Attendance: 4,000
Referee: Andrei Butenko (Russia)
23 January 2002
19:00

Spartak Moscow (Russia)	3 – 1	(Georgia (country)) Torpedo Kutaisi
Tsykhmeystruk 6'; Parfenov 16' (pen.); Sychev 82'		Silagadze 29' (pen.)

Olympic Sport Complex, Moscow
Attendance: 4,500
Referee: Paulius Malžinskas (Lithuania)

=== Semifinals ===
25 January 2002
16:00

Skonto Riga (Latvia)	0 – 3	(Ukraine) Dynamo Kyiv
		Idahor 51', 55'; Serebrennikov 89'

Olympic Sport Complex, Moscow
Attendance: 4,000
Referee: Valentin Ivanov (Russia)
25 January 2002
19:00

Spartak Moscow (Russia)	4 – 0	(Lithuania) FBK Kaunas
Danishevsky 2'; Beschastnykh 60', 77'; Sychev 83'

Olympic Sport Complex, Moscow
Attendance: 12,000
Referee: Karen Nalbandyan (Armenia)

=== Final ===
27 January 2002
13:00

Spartak Moscow (Russia)	3 – 4	(Ukraine) Dynamo Kyiv
Tsykhmeystruk 4'; Danishevsky 45'; Sychev 86'		Khatskevich 7'; Peev 45+2'; Byalkevich 63'; Idahor 85'

Olympic Sport Complex, Moscow
Attendance: 27,000
Referee: Sergey Shmolik (Belarus)

== Top scorers ==
Rank	Player	Team	Goals
1	(Russia) Vladimir Beschastnykh	(Russia) Spartak Moscow	7
2	(Russia) Aleksandr Danishevsky	(Russia) Spartak Moscow	6
2	(Russia) Dmitri Sychev	(Russia) Spartak Moscow	6
4	(Nigeria) Lucky Idahor	(Ukraine) Dynamo Kyiv	5
5	(Turkmenistan) Didargylyç Urazow	(Turkmenistan) Nisa Aşgabat	4
6	(Latvia) Māris Verpakovskis	(Latvia) Skonto Riga	3
6	(Moldova) Stanislav Ivanov	(Moldova) Sheriff Tiraspol	3
6	(Moldova) Ruslan Barburoș	(Moldova) Sheriff Tiraspol	3
