= Ričardas Beniušis =

Lithuanian footballer

Personal information
- Date of birth: 23 April 1980 (age 46)
- Place of birth: Panevėžys, Lithuanian SSR, Soviet Union
- Position: Forward

Senior career*
| Years | Team | Apps | (Gls) |
| 1999–2000 | Inkaras Kaunas | 27 | (18) |
| 2000–2001 | Baltika Kaliningrad | 1 | (0) |
| 2001 | Inkaras Kaunas | 20 | (15) |
| 2001 | Krylya Sovetov Samara | 0 | (0) |
| 2002 | Inkaras Kaunas | 13 | (2) |
| 2002 | Start | 9 | (1) |
| 2002–2003 | Atlantas Klaipeda | 12 | (6) |
| 2003–2008 | FBK Kaunas | 110 | (65) |
| 2007–2008 | → Hearts (loan) | 8 | (0) |
| 2008 | → Liepājas Metalurgs (loan) | 24 | (5) |
| 2009 | DAC Dunajská Streda | 13 | (1) |
| 2009 | Sūduva | 10 | (11) |
| 2010 | Hapoel Ra'anana | 12 | (3) |
| 2009–2013 | Sūduva | 81 | (29) |
| 2013–2015 | Kruoja Pakruojis | 91 | (36) |
| 2015–2021 | Šilas Kazlų Rūda | 114 | (128) |
| 2017 | FK Šilutė | 23 | (8) |
| 2018 | FK Panerys Vilnius | 6 | (5) |
| 2022-2023 | FK Saned Joniškis | 32 | (41) |
| 2023 | Tauras | 12 | (8) |
| 2024-2025 | FK Jonava | 43 | (47) |

International career
| 2001–2014 | Lithuania | 31 | (3) |
- * Club domestic league appearances and goals as of 28 January 2026

Ricardas Beniušis (born 23 April 1980) is a Lithuanian former footballer.

Beniušis started his career with Atletas Kaunas team in 1998 and played in Lithuanian First league. After one year he joined Inkaras Kaunas in A lyga. He played there until 2002, while returning there after short spells with Russian clubs Baltika Kaliningrad and Krylya Sovetov Samara. He spent one season in Norway (2002) with Start before again moving back to Lithuania with Atlantas Klaipeda. He joined FBK Kaunas in 2003, and has since won 3 A Lyga titles, two Lithuanian Cups and two Lithuanian Super Cups with the club.

He joined Hearts on a season-long loan deal in July 2007. He made his debut for Hearts in a 1–0 defeat to city rivals Hibernian F.C., playing very poorly and leading to many calling him 'Beniuseless'. He made few starts for Hearts and was sent back to FBK Kaunas early, on 19 March 2008.

In January 2010, he signed for the Israeli club, Hapoel Ra'anana for three years.

== Career statistics ==
=== Club ===
| Club | Season | League | | | Cup | | Continental | | Others | | Total | |
| Club | Season | Division | Apps | Goals | Apps | Goals | Apps | Goals | Apps | Goals | Apps | Goals |
|---|---|---|---|---|---|---|---|---|---|---|---|---|
| Atletas | 1998-99 | I Lyga | 23 | 16 | | | - | | - | | 23 | 16 |
| Inkaras Kaunas | 1999 | A Lyga | 14 | 9 | 1 | 3 | - | | - | | 15 | 12 |
| Inkaras Kaunas | 2000 | A Lyga | 13 | 9 | 0 | 0 | - | | - | | 13 | 9 |
| Baltika Kaliningrad | 2000 | Russian First League | 1 | 0 | | | - | | - | | 1 | 0 |
| Krylya Sovetov Samara | 2001 | Russian Premier League | 0 | 0 | | | - | | - | | 0 | 0 |
| Inkaras Kaunas | 2001 | A Lyga | 20 | 15 | 0 | 0 | | | - | | 20 | 15 |
| Inkaras Kaunas | 2002 | A Lyga | 13 | 2 | 3 | 3 | | | - | | 16 | 5 |
| Inkaras Kaunas | Total Inkaras Kaunas | | 60 | 35 | 4 | 6 | 0 | 0 | 0 | 0 | 64 | 41 |
| Start | 2002 | Tippeligaen | 9 | 1 | | | | | | | 9 | 1 |
| Atlantas | 2003 | A Lyga | 12 | 6 | 1 | 0 | | | | | 13 | 6 |
| Kaunas | 2003 | A Lyga | 12 | 10 | 1 | 0 | 3 | 2 | 1 | 1 | 17 | 13 |
| Kaunas | 2004 | A Lyga | 22 | 8 | 4 | 3 | 2 | 0 | 2 | 2 | 30 | 13 |
| Kaunas | 2005 | A Lyga | 28 | 16 | 5 | 7 | | | 2 | 3 | 35 | 26 |
| Kaunas | 2006 | A Lyga | 30 | 14 | 2 | 0 | 2 | 0 | 4 | 2 | 39 | 16 |
| Kaunas | 2007 | A Lyga | 18 | 17 | | | 2 | 1 | 3 | 5 | 23 | 23 |
| Kaunas | Total Kaunas | | 110 | 65 | 12 | 10 | 9 | 3 | 12 | 13 | 143 | 91 |
| Heart | 2007-08 | Scottish Premier League | 8 | 0 | - | | - | | - | | 8 | 0 |
| Liepājas Metalurgs | 2008 | Latvian Higher League | 24 | 5 | 1 | 1 | 4 | 0 | 3 | 2 | 32 | 8 |
| Dunajská Streda | 2008-09 | Slovak Superliga | 13 | 1 | - | | - | | - | | 13 | 1 |
| Sūduva | 2009 | A Lyga | 10 | 11 | 1 | 1 | | | 3 | 3 | 14 | 15 |
| Hapoel Ra'anana | 2009-10 | Liga Ha'Al | 12 | 3 | | | | | | | 12 | 3 |
| Sūduva | 2010 | A Lyga | 12 | 4 | | | 2 | 1 | 2 | 2 | 16 | 7 |
| Sūduva | 2011 | A Lyga | 31 | 9 | 2 | 2 | 2 | 1 | | | 35 | 12 |
| Sūduva | 2012 | A Lyga | 28 | 5 | | | 4 | 1 | | | 32 | 6 |
| Sūduva | Total Sūduva | | 81 | 29 | 3 | 3 | 8 | 3 | 5 | 5 | 97 | 40 |
| Kruoja Pakruojis | 2013 | A Lyga | 32 | 13 | 3 | 2 | 2 | 0 | | | 37 | 15 |
| Kruoja Pakruojis | 2014 | A Lyga | 35 | 15 | 1 | 0 | | | | | 36 | 15 |
| Kruoja Pakruojis | 2015 | A Lyga | 24 | 8 | | | 2 | 0 | | | 26 | 8 |
| Kruoja Pakruojis | Total Kruoja Pakruojis | | 91 | 36 | 4 | 2 | 4 | 0 | 0 | 0 | 99 | 38 |
| Šilas Kazlų Ruda | 2015 | I Lyga | 6 | 5 | | | - | | - | | 6 | 5 |
| Šilas Kazlų Ruda | 2016 | I Lyga | 27 | 25 | - | | - | | - | | 27 | 25 |
| Šilutė | 2017 | I Lyga | 23 | 8 | 1 | 0 | - | | - | | 24 | 8 |
| Panerys Vilnius | 2018 | II Lyga | 6 | 5 | 2 | 2 | - | | - | | 8 | 7 |
| Šilas Kazlų Rūda | 2019 | II Lyga | 23 | 35 | - | | - | | | | 23 | 35 |
| Šilas Kazlų Rūda | 2020 | II Lyga | 32 | 41 | 2 | 2 | - | | - | | 34 | 43 |
| Šilas Kazlų Rūda | 2021 | I Lyga | 26 | 21 | 2 | 2 | - | | - | | 28 | 23 |
| Šilas Kazlų Rūda | Total Šilas KR | | 114 | 127 | 4 | 4 | - | | - | | 118 | 131 |
| Saned Joniškis | 2022 | II Lyga | 22 | 34 | 2 | 1 | - | | - | | 24 | 35 |
| Saned Joniškis | 2023 | II Lyga | 10 | 7 | - | | - | | - | | 10 | 7 |
| Tauras | 2023 | II Lyga | 12 | 8 | - | | - | | - | | 12 | 8 |
| Jonava | 2024 | II Lyga | 28 | 38 | 3 | 6 | - | | - | | 31 | 44 |
| Jonava | 2025 | II Lyga | 9 | 0 | 3 | 3 | - | | - | | 12 | 3 |
| Tauras B | 2025 | II Lyga | 14 | 11 | - | | - | | - | | 14 | 11 |
| Total career | | | 682 | 435 | 40 | 38 | 25 | 6 | 20 | 20 | 767 | 499 |

=== International ===
| National team | Years | Apps | Goals |
|---|---|---|---|
| Lithuania | 2001 | 2 | 0 |
| Lithuania | 2002 | 3 | 1 |
| Lithuania | 2003 | 3 | 0 |
| Lithuania | 2004 | 1 | 0 |
| Lithuania | 2005 | 1 | 0 |
| Lithuania | 2006 | 5 | 0 |
| Lithuania | 2007 | 3 | 0 |
| Lithuania | 2008 | 6 | 1 |
| Lithuania | 2010 | 1 | 0 |
| Lithuania | 2011 | 3 | 1 |
| Lithuania | 2014 | 3 | 0 |
| Total | | 31 | 3 |
