= Audrius Šlekys =

Lithuanian footballer

Personal information
- Date of birth: 2 April 1975
- Place of birth: Kaunas, Lithuanian SSR, Soviet Union
- Date of death: 27 July 2003 (aged 28)
- Place of death: Žiegždriai, Lithuania
- Height: 1.85 m (6 ft 1 in)
- Position: Forward

Senior career*
Years	Team	Apps	(Gls)
1992–1993	FBK Kaunas	0	(0)
1993–1998	Inkaras Kaunas	87	(29)
1998	Alania Vladikavkaz	3	(0)
1998	→ Alania Vladikavkaz II (loan)	3	(2)
1998–1999	Žalgiris Kaunas	18	(4)
2000	Metallurg Lipetsk	3	(0)
2001–2003	FBK Kaunas	63	(28)
Total		177	(63)

International career
1996	Lithuania	1	(0)
- * Club domestic league appearances and goals

Audrius Šlekys (2 April 1975 - 27 July 2003) was a Lithuanian football player.

== Club career ==
Šlekys played for several clubs in his hometown Kaunas and had spells in Russia with Alania Vladikavkaz and Metallurg Lipetsk. In 2002 he topped the Lithuanian goalscoring charts with 19 goals FOR FBK Kaunas.

== International career ==
He made his debut for Lithuania in a July 1996 friendly match against Belarus, his only international game.

== Death ==
Šlekys was killed in a car accident in July 2003, after he lost control of his BMW near the village of Žiegždriai.

== Honours ==
Individual

- A Lyga top scorer: 2002 (19 goals)

Inkaras Kaunas

- A Lyga champion: 1994–95, 1995–96
- A Lyga bronze: 1996–97
- Lithuanian Football Cup winner: 1995
- Lithuanian Football Cup runner-up: 1996, 1997

Žalgiris Kaunas/FBK Kaunas

- A Lyga champion: 1999, 2001, 2002, 2003
- A Lyga bronze: 1998–99
- Lithuanian Football Cup winner: 2002
- Lithuanian Football Cup runner-up: 1999
