= Tadas Papečkys =

Lithuanian footballer

Personal information
- Date of birth: 28 September 1978 (age 48)
- Place of birth: Mariampolė, Lithuanian SSR, Soviet Union
- Height: 1.72 m (5 ft 8 in)
- Position: Defender

Senior career*
Years	Team	Apps	(Gls)
1997–2005	FBK Kaunas	154	(29)
2002	→ Anzhi Makhachkala (loan)	1	(0)
2006	Šilutė	27	(2)
2007	Rīga	9	(0)
2007–2009	Górnik Zabrze	24	(0)
2009	→ ŁKS Łódź (loan)	10	(0)
2010	Sillamäe Kalev	5	(0)
2012–2014	Lietava		
2014	Šilas Kazlų Rūda		

International career
2005–2008	Lithuania	7	(0)
- * Club domestic league appearances and goals

Tadas Papečkys (born 28 September 1978) is a Lithuanian former professional footballer who played as a defender. During his career, he represented clubs such as FBK Kaunas, Anzhi Makhachkala, Šilutė, Riga, ŁKS Łódź and Górnik Zabrze.

Papečkys has made seven appearances for the Lithuania national football team.

== Honours ==
FBK Kaunas

- A Lyga: 1999, 2000, 2001, 2003, 2004, 2005
- Lithuanian Cup: 2001–02, 2004, 2005

Latvia

- Baltic Cup: 2005
