= 2001 A Lyga =

A Lyga
- Season: 2001
- Dates: 1 April - 11 November
- Champions: FBK Kaunas
- Relegated: FK Vetra; FK Dainava Alytus
- UEFA Champions League: FBK Kaunas
- UEFA Cup: FK Atlantas; FK Zalgiris
- UEFA Intertoto Cup: FK Ekranas

The Lithuanian A Lyga 2001 was the 12th season of top-tier football in Lithuania. The season started on 1 April 2001 and ended on 11 November 2001. 10 teams participated, and FBK Kaunas won the championship.

== League standings ==
Pos	Team	Pld	W	D	L	GF	GA	GD	Pts	Qualification or relegation
1	FBK Kaunas (C)	36	26	7	3	76	13	+63	85	Qualification to Champions League first qualifying round
2	Atlantas	36	19	12	5	66	29	+37	69	Qualification to UEFA Cup qualifying round
3	Žalgiris	36	20	9	7	64	39	+25	69	Qualification to UEFA Cup qualifying round
4	Ekranas	36	15	10	11	58	38	+20	55	Qualification to Intertoto Cup first round
5	Inakaras	36	11	12	13	50	44	+6	45	
6	Geležinis Vilkas	36	10	6	20	42	69	−27	36	
7	Nevėžis	36	8	11	17	33	54	−21	35	
8	Sakalas	36	7	13	16	32	61	−29	34	
9	Vėtra (R)	36	7	11	18	32	57	−25	32	Relegation to 1 Lyga
10	Dainava (R)	36	7	9	20	34	83	−49	30	Relegation to 1 Lyga

Source: RSSSF.com
(C) Champions; (R) Relegated

== Results ==
=== First half of season ===
Home \ Away	ATL	DAI	EKR	FBK	GEL	INK	NEV	SAK	VĖT	ŽAL
Atlantas		2–0	2–2	1–2	1–0	1–1	2–0	3–0	5–2	3–1
Dainava	0–1		1–3	0–4	0–2	1–2	1–2	0–1	3–2	0–4
Ekranas	1–1	12–0		0–1	1–0	0–1	1–0	1–1	0–2	0–3
FBK Kaunas	0–1	6–0	2–0		2–1	1–1	4–0	4–0	3–0	2–0
Geležinis Vilkas	1–2	4–1	1–2	1–3		0–0	0–2	0–2	2–2	1–2
Inkaras	1–4	3–2	0–1	0–2	0–2		2–0	4–0	2–0	1–2
Nevėžis	1–2	1–1	0–0	0–0	1–1	1–1		0–0	1–0	1–0
Sakalas	2–4	1–1	2–3	0–2	0–2	1–1	2–0		2–0	1–1
Vėtra	0–2	2–1	0–0	1–5	0–1	0–3	0–2	2–1		1–3
Žalgiris	1–0	5–2	0–0	0–0	2–1	1–0	4–2	2–1	1–1	

Legend: Blue = home team win; Yellow = draw; Red = away team win.

=== Second half of season ===
Home \ Away	ATL	DAI	EKR	FBK	GEL	INK	NEV	SAK	VĖT	ŽAL
Atlantas		0–0	0–3	0–0	7–2	0–2	1–0	3–0	2–0	1–1
Dainava	0–0		2–0	0–5	1–0	0–0	1–1	2–0	1–1	2–2
Ekranas	4–1	4–2		0–1	5–0	0–0	1–2	1–1	1–0	3–0
FBK Kaunas	0–0	1–1	4–0		3–0	2–0	3–0	2–0	3–0	0–1
Geležinis Vilkas	0–6	1–0	0–4	1–3		0–3	4–1	2–2	1–1	1–2
Inkaras	1–1	1–2	1–1	1–2	1–2		3–1	9–0	1–1	2–3
Nevėžis	0–6	5–0	1–2	2–0	1–2	1–1		1–1	1–1	1–1
Sakalas	1–1	1–3	1–0	0–1	1–1	1–1	2–0		1–1	3–1
Vėtra	0–0	1–3	4–1	0–0	1–2	2–0	2–1	0–0		2–0
Žalgiris	0–0	3–0	1–1	1–3	4–3	6–0	2–0	2–0	2–0	

Legend: Blue = home team win; Yellow = draw; Red = away team win.

== See also ==
- 2001 LFF Lyga
