= Modestas Stonys =

Lithuanian footballer and coach

Personal information
- Full name: Modestas Stonys
- Date of birth: 17 January 1980 (age 46)
- Place of birth: Lithuania
- Height: 1.88 m (6 ft 2 in)
- Position: Goalkeeper

Team information
- Current team: FK Kauno Žalgiris
- Number: 33

Senior career*
Years	Team	Apps	(Gls)
1998	FBK Kaunas		
1999	Kauno Jėgeriai	22	(0)
2000	Kareda Kaunas	21	(0)
2001	Inkaras Kaunas	15	(0)
2002	FK Šiauliai	15	(0)
2002–2003	FBK Kaunas	6	(0)
2004–2005	FK Šilutė	45	(0)
2006	FC Levadia	11	(0)
2007	FBK Kaunas	7	(0)
2008	FK Atlantas	12	(0)
2009–2010	JK Narva Trans	32	(0)
2011	FK Jonava	5	(0)
2011	FBK Kaunas	1	(0)
2012–2014	FK Jonava	49	(0)
2015–	FK Kauno Žalgiris	18	(0)

International career^{‡}
2002	Lithuania	1	(0)
- * Club domestic league appearances and goals as of 15 June 2010 ‡ National team caps and goals as of 10 July 2008

Modestas Stonys (born 17 January 1980) is a Lithuanian professional footballer and a goalkeeper coach who plays for an A lyga club FK Kauno Žalgiris. He plays the position of goalkeeper and is 1.88 m tall and weighs 80 kg. He is a former member of the Lithuania national football team.
