= 2011 A Lyga =

A Lyga
- Season: 2011
- Champions: Ekranas; 6th title
- Champions League: Ekranas
- Europa League: Žalgiris; Sūduva; Šiauliai
- Baltic League: Ekranas; Žalgiris; Sūduva; Šiauliai; Kruoja
- Matches: 198
- Goals: 560 (2.83 per match)
- Biggest home win: Sūduva 13–0 Atlantas
- Biggest away win: Dainava 0–6 Sūduva
- Highest scoring: Sūduva 13–0 Atlantas
- Longest winning run: Ekranas, Žalgiris (8 games each)
- Longest unbeaten run: Ekranas (19 games)
- Longest winless run: FC Klaipėda (20 games)
- Longest losing run: FC Klaipėda (17 games)

The 2011 A Lyga was the 22nd season of the A Lyga, the top-tier football league of Lithuania. The season began on 12 March 2011 and ended on 6 November 2011. Ekranas were the defending champions, having won their third consecutive title at the end of the 2010 season.

== Teams ==
The league will see a change in the number of teams once again as twelve teams were granted a licence for 2011, one more than in the 2010 season.

FK Vėtra were expelled over financial troubles after 16 matches of the 2010 season; their records were annulled and the team was subsequently disbanded. From the remaining ten clubs, Atletas Kaunas, who finished in last place at the end of the season, were the only team not to apply for a 2011 top-level licence. Atletas therefore played at the second level in 2011.

Three new teams were admitted to the league, unbeaten 2010 I Lyga champions FBK Kaunas, seventh-placed team Atlantas Klaipėda and Dainava Alytus, a merger between I Lyga runners-up Alytis Alytus and third-placed city rivals Vidzgiris. FBK Kaunas and Atlantas made their return after two seasons in the lower divisions of the Lithuanian league system, while Dainava had their debut in the A Lyga, as neither of its predecessor clubs played at the Lithuanian top level in its history.

Location of teams in the 2010 A Lyga

Club	Location	Stadium	2010 season
Atlantas	Klaipėda	Žalgiris Stadium (Klaipėda)	I Lyga, 7th
Banga	Gargždai	Gargždai Stadium	A Lyga, 6th
Dainava	Alytus		I Lyga, 2nd/3rd
Ekranas	Panevėžys	Aukštaitija Stadium	A Lyga, 1st
FBK Kaunas	Kaunas	S. Darius and S. Girėnas Stadium	I Lyga, 1st
FC Klaipėda	Klaipėda	Žalgiris Stadium (Klaipėda)	A Lyga, 8th
Kruoja	Pakruojis	Pakruojis Stadium	A Lyga, 7th
Mažeikiai	Mažeikiai	Sports Centre Stadium	A Lyga, 9th
Sūduva	Marijampolė	Sūduva Stadium	A Lyga, 2nd
Šiauliai	Šiauliai	Savivaldybė Stadium	A Lyga, 5th
Tauras	Tauragė	Vytauto Stadium	A Lyga, 4th
Žalgiris	Vilnius	Žalgiris Stadium	A Lyga, 3rd

== League table ==
Pos	Team	Pld	W	D	L	GF	GA	GD	Pts	Qualification or relegation
1	Ekranas (C)	33	24	8	1	68	14	+54	80	Qualification to Champions League second qualifying round
2	Žalgiris	33	22	6	5	56	17	+39	72	Qualification to Europa League second qualifying round (Note: The winners of the 2011–12 Lithuanian Football Cup competition, Žalgiris Vilnius, qualified for the second qualifying round of UEFA Europa League. As they finished second, the fourth-placed team of the league also qualified for the Europa League.)
3	Sūduva	33	19	8	6	70	19	+51	65	Qualification to Europa League first qualifying round
4	Šiauliai	33	16	11	6	45	30	+15	59	Qualification to Europa League first qualifying round
5	Kruoja	33	13	10	10	43	34	+9	49	
6	Banga	33	13	7	13	51	37	+14	46	
7	Tauras	33	11	12	10	50	38	+12	45 (Note: TAU: 7 pts; DAI: 1 pt)	
8	Dainava	33	13	6	14	53	54	−1	45	
9	Mažeikiai (R)	33	9	9	15	36	54	−18	36	Relegation to Lower leagues (Note: FK Mažeikiai, FBK Kaunas and FC Klaipėda were not granted a 2012 A Lyga licence; Kaunas will compete in the second-level I Lyga, while Mažeikiai and Klaipėda will not play in any of the two highest leagues in 2012.)
10	FBK Kaunas (Note: FBK Kaunas were deducted six points before the start of the season because of outstanding debts to a former player.) (R)	33	8	8	17	41	53	−12	26	Relegation to I Lyga
11	Atlantas	33	3	2	28	28	121	−93	11	
12	Klaipėda (R)	33	2	3	28	19	89	−70	9	Relegation to Lower leagues

Source: Soccerway
Rules for classification: 1st points; 2nd head-to-head points; 3rd head-to-head goal difference; 4th goal difference; 5th number of goals scored; 6th number of wins.
(C) Champions; (R) Relegated

== Results ==
Teams played each other three times, either twice at home and once away or vice versa, for a total of 33 matches per team.

=== Matches 1–22 ===
Home \ Away	ATL	BAN	DAI	EKR	FBK	KLA	KRU	MAŽ	SŪD	ŠIA	TAU	ŽAL
Atlantas		1–2	1–0	0–4	2–0	1–3	1–2	0–5	0–2	0–2	2–4	0–3
Banga	3–0		1–2	1–4	1–1	3–1	1–2	0–1	0–1	3–1	1–1	0–1
Dainava	7–0	2–4		0–3	1–0	5–1	0–0	2–0	0–6	1–1	1–2	0–2
Ekranas	7–0	1–1	1–0		3–0	2–2	0–0	5–0	1–0	1–0	1–0	1–2
FBK Kaunas	4–0	1–1	0–1	0–1		2–2	3–1	0–0	0–3	0–1	1–1	0–1
Klaipėda	0–4	0–3	0–1	0–1	1–2		1–2	2–4	0–2	0–1	1–0	0–1
Kruoja	0–0	0–0	0–1	0–4	2–0	2–0		2–1	0–1	1–2	1–1	0–1
Mažeikiai	2–0	2–2	2–2	1–2	1–1	1–0	0–2		0–0	0–0	0–0	2–0
Sūduva	5–2	0–1	6–1	0–0	3–0	2–1	1–2	3–0		0–0	3–0	1–1
Šiauliai	3–1	1–3	1–3	0–0	2–1	4–0	0–4	1–0	1–0		1–0	0–0
Tauras	6–0	0–3	2–1	0–0 (Note: This match was played in Panevėžys. It is shown here as a Tauras home match for organizational purposes.)	1–1	2–1	0–0	1–1	1–2	1–1		1–1
Žalgiris	8–1	3–1	2–1	0–1	3–0	5–0	1–0 (Note: This match was played in Pakruojis. It is shown here as a Žalgiris home match for organizational purposes.)	1–1	3–1	0–0	1–0	

Source: Soccerway
Legend: Blue = home team win; Yellow = draw; Red = away team win.

=== Matches 23–33 ===
Home \ Away	ATL	BAN	DAI	EKR	FBK	KLA	KRU	MAŽ	SŪD	ŠIA	TAU	ŽAL
Atlantas			2–5		3–4	2–2	0–3	2–3				
Banga	5–0		3–1				1–2	2–0	0–2			
Dainava				1–5			2–2	3–0		0–1		1–3
Ekranas	2–1	1–0			3–1	5–0			2–2			
FBK Kaunas		2–0	0–2			5–1			2–1			
Klaipėda		0–5	0–3					0–2	0–1		0–2	
Kruoja				0–2	0–4	6–0				1–1		
Mažeikiai				1–2	3–2		1–4			1–5		0–1
Sūduva	13–0		1–1				0–0	4–0		0–0		2–0
Šiauliai	3–1	2–0		0–0	2–2	5–0						1–0
Tauras	6–1	1–0	2–2	0–1	4–2		2–2	3–1	0–2	6–2		
Žalgiris	3–0	0–0		1–2	2–0	3–0	2–0				1–0	

Source: Soccerway
Legend: Blue = home team win; Yellow = draw; Red = away team win.

== Top goalscorers ==
Including matches played on 6 November 2011; Source: Lietuvos futbolo statistika

Pos.	Player	Club	Goals
1	(Lithuania) Deivydas Matulevičius	Žalgiris	19
2	(France) Goran Jerković	Tauras	17
2	(Lithuania) Arsenij Buinickij	Dainava	17
4	(Lithuania) Tadas Eliošius	Sūduva	13
5	(Lithuania) Povilas Lukšys	Sūduva	12
5	(Ukraine) Sergej Zhygalov	Mažeikiai/Sūduva	12
7	(Netherlands) Regilio Seedorf	Tauras	11
7	(Lithuania) Evaldas Razulis	Kaunas	11
9	(Serbia) Marko Anđelković	Ekranas	9
9	(Lithuania) Andrius Velička	Ekranas	9
9	(Lithuania) Ričardas Beniušis	Sūduva	9
9	(Lithuania) Artūras Rimkevičius	Šiauliai	9
