= Irmantas Zelmikas =

Lithuanian footballer

Personal information
- Full name: Irmantas Zelmikas
- Date of birth: 3 January 1980 (age 46)
- Place of birth: Telšiai, Lithuanian SSR
- Height: 1.90 m (6 ft 3 in)
- Position: Defender

Youth career
- 1992–1997: Kareda Šiauliai

Senior career*
Years	Team	Apps	(Gls)
1997–1999	Inkaras Kaunas	38	(0)
1999	Žalgiris Vilnius	2	(0)
2000	Kareda Kaunas	17	(3)
2000–2001	FBK Kaunas	7	(0)
2001	Inkaras Kaunas	14	(1)
2002–2006	FBK Kaunas	72	(8)
2004	→ Šilutė (loan)	3	(0)
2004	→ MTZ-RIPO Minsk (loan)	7	(1)
2006–2007	Tavriya Simferopol	30	(1)
2008	FBK Kaunas	16	(1)
2009	Sūduva Marijampolė	10	(0)
2010	Hapoel Ra'anana	17	(0)
2011	Banga Gargždai	27	(3)
2012	Kruoja Pakruojis	32	(3)
2013–2015	Askim FK	51	(7)
Total		343	(28)

International career
2003–2010	Lithuania	13	(0)
- * Club domestic league appearances and goals

Irmantas Zelmikas (born 3 January 1980) is a Lithuanian former professional footballer who played as a defender.

== Career ==
Zelmikas has spent the majority of his career in his native Lithuania with several spells at FBK Kaunas. He also played numerous times for the Lithuanian national team.

Zelmikas had a trial spell with Scottish Premier League club Dundee United in 2010. He scored goals for both teams in a friendly match against Hull City in July of that year.

== Honours ==
- A Lyga
  - 2000, 2002, 2003
- Lithuanian Cup
  - 2002, 2005
- Lithuanian Super Cup
  - 2002

National Team

- Baltic Cup
  - 2005, 2010
