= Andrius Gedgaudas =

Lithuanian footballer (born 1978)

Personal information
- Date of birth: 18 September 1978 (age 48)
- Place of birth: Kaunas, Lithuanian SSR
- Height: 1.81 m (5 ft 11 1/2 in)
- Position: Midfielder

Senior career*
Years	Team	Apps	(Gls)
1995–1996	Atlantas	5	(4)
1996	Žalgiris-2	2	(0)
1996–1998	Atlantas	51	(4)
1998–1999	Kareda Kaunas	26	(7)
1999–2000	Widzew Łódź	17	(1)
2001	Atlantas	15	(8)
2001–2002	Metalurh Donetsk	11	(0)
2001–2002	Metalurh-2 Donetsk	9	(1)
2002	Spartak Yerevan	1	(0)
2003–2005	FBK Kaunas	37	(7)
2005	Tom Tomsk	1	(0)
2006	Atlantas	29	(3)
2006–2008	Inter Baku	17	(1)
2008	Banga Gargždai		
2008–2009	TSV Rain am Lech	6	(0)
2009	FC Mertingen		
2009–2010	Banga Gargždai	7	(1)
2010	Tauras Tauragė	13	(2)
2011	FC Donauwörth 08		
2011	Šilutė	3	(0)
2011	Tauras Tauragė	5	(0)
2013	Klaipėdos Granitas	22	(4)
2015–2016	Šilutė	22	(6)

International career
2003–2007	Lithuania	12	(2)
- * Club domestic league appearances and goals

Andrius Gedgaudas (born 18 September 1978) is a Lithuanian former professional footballer who played predominantly as a midfielder.

In 2004, he received best player award of the Lithuanian top division A Lyga while playing for FBK Kaunas.

== International goals ==
Scores and results list Lithuania's goal tally first.

No	Date	Venue	Opponent	Score	Result	Competition
1.	8 September 2004	S. Darius and S. Girėnas Stadium, Kaunas, Lithuania	San Marino	4–0	4–0	2006 World Cup qualifier
2.	2 May 2006	GIEKSA Arena, Bełchatów, Poland	Poland	1–0	1–0	Friendly match

== Honours ==
Kareda Kaunas

- Lithuanian Cup: 1998–99

Atlantas

- Lithuanian Cup: 2000–01

FBK Kaunas

- A Lyga: 2003, 2004
- Lithuanian Cup: 2004
