= Deivydas Matulevičius =

Lithuanian footballer (born 1989)

Personal information
- Date of birth: 8 April 1989 (age 37)
- Place of birth: Alytus, Lithuanian SSR, Soviet Union
- Height: 1.90 m (6 ft 3 in)
- Position: Forward

Youth career
- Vilkmergė Ukmergė
- Vilnius

Senior career*
Years	Team	Apps	(Gls)
2007	Interas-AE Visaginas	15	(1)
2007–2008	Vilnius		(13)
2009–2010	Odra Wodzisław	17	(2)
2011–2012	Žalgiris	31	(19)
2012	→ Cracovia (loan)	7	(0)
2012–2015	Pandurii Târgu Jiu	69	(24)
2015	Tobol	13	(0)
2016–2017	Botoșani	26	(6)
2017	Royal Mouscron	16	(4)
2017–2018	Hibernian	12	(0)
2018	KuPS	6	(0)
2018–2019	Rapid București	19	(12)
2019	Kauno Žalgiris	11	(3)
2020	Glentoran	3	(0)
2020	CSM Reșița	8	(0)
2021	Dainava	26	(5)
Total		279+	(89)

International career
2005–2006	Lithuania U17	3	(0)
2007–2008	Lithuania U19	6	(0)
2007–2009	Lithuania U21	13	(6)
2012–2019	Lithuania	40	(5)
- * Club domestic league appearances and goals as of 2 November 2021

Deivydas Matulevičius (born 8 April 1989) is a Lithuanian former professional footballer who played as a striker. Matulevičius has previously played for Interas-AE Visaginas, FC Vilnius and Žalgiris Vilnius in Lithuania, Odra Wodzisław, Cracovia and Reșița in Poland, Pandurii Târgu Jiu, FC Botoșani and Rapid București in Romania, Tobol in Kazakhstan, Royal Mouscron in Belgium, Hibernian in Scotland and Glentoran in Northern Ireland.

== Career ==
=== Club ===
Matulevičius signed a two-year contract with Hibernian in July 2017. He scored in a 5–0 Scottish League Cup win against Ayr United on 8 August, but made few appearances and was made available for transfer in December. He was subsequently released from his contract on 31 January 2018.

In January 2020, Matulevičius signed for Glentoran.

In 2021, Matulevičius joined Lithuanian club Dainava.

=== International ===
As of match played 10 June 2017. Lithuania score listed first, score column indicates score after each Matulevičius goal.

International goals by date, venue, cap, opponent, score, result and competition
No.	Date	Venue	Cap	Opponent	Score	Result	Competition
1	14 August 2013	Stade Josy Barthel, Luxembourg City, Luxembourg	9	Luxembourg	1–0	1–2	International friendly
2	6 September 2013	Skonto Stadium, Riga, Latvia	10	Latvia	1–2	1–2	2014 FIFA World Cup qualification
3	10 September 2013	Sūduva Stadium, Marijampolė, Lithuania	11	Liechtenstein	1–0	2–0	2014 FIFA World Cup qualification
4	3 September 2014	Tauernstadion, Matrei in Osttirol, Austria	14	United Arab Emirates	1–0	1–1	International friendly
5	8 September 2014	San Marino Stadium, Serravalle, San Marino	15	San Marino	1–0	2–0	UEFA Euro 2016 qualifying

== Honours ==
Rapid București

- Liga III: 2018–19

Individual

- A Lyga top scorer: 2011 (19 goals)
