= Kauno Jėgeriai =

Lithuanian football team

Kauno Jėgeriai founded in 1993, was a Lithuanian football team based in Kaunas city. It was a farm-team of FBK Kaunas.

== Participation in Lithuanian Championships ==
- 2003 – 7th (1 Lyga)
- 2004 – 2nd (1 Lyga)
- 2005 – 2nd (1 Lyga)
