= Modestas =

- Gender: Male
- Language: Lithuanian
- Name day: 15 April, 2 October

Origin
- Region of origin: Lithuania

Modestas is a Lithuanian masculine given name. Individuals with the name Modestas include:

- Modestas Bukauskas (born 1995), Lithuanian-British mixed martial artist
- Modestas Paulauskas (born 1945), Lithuanian basketball player and coach
- Modestas Stonys (born 1980), Lithuanian footballer
- Modestas Vaičiulis (born 1989), Lithuanian cross-country skier
