= Eugenijus Riabovas =

Lithuanian footballer and manager

Personal information
- Full name: Eugenijus Riabovas
- Date of birth: 3 February 1951 (age 75)
- Place of birth: Kaunas, Lithuania
- Height: 1.79 m (5 ft 10 1/2 in)
- Position: Midfielder

Senior career*
Years	Team	Apps	(Gls)
1969	Granitas Klaipėda		
1970–1975	Atlantas Klaipėda		
1976–1981	Žalgiris Vilnius		
1982–1985	Pažanga Vilnius		

Managerial career
- 1996–2001: Žalgiris Vilnius
- 1997–1998: Lithuania U21
- 2003–2004: Žalgiris Vilnius
- 2005–2006: FBK Kaunas
- 2007–2008: Šilutė
- 2008–2009: FBK Kaunas
- * Club domestic league appearances and goals

Eugenijus Riabovas (born 3 February 1951) is a Lithuanian football manager.

== Playing career ==
Prior to his coaching career, Riabovas played for Žalgiris Vilnius and 3 times was named as Best Footballer of Lithuania. Riabovas was once the captain of the Lithuanian SSR football team during the USSR era.

== Managerial career ==
He was recently the manager of A Lyga side FBK Kaunas.

In November 2006 he was briefly attached to Scottish Premier League football club Heart of Midlothian FC, in an advisory capacity. On 14 November 2006 it was speculated by the Scottish press that Riabovas would be the replacement for temporary head coach Eduard Malofeev, but this was later denied and did not take place, with Valdas Ivanauskas returning to take up the position, following a period of illness.
