= 2001 Lithuanian football leagues =

LFF Lyga
- Season: 2001

Final tables of the Lithuanian Championship in 2001 are presented below. The Lithuanian Football Federation (LFF) organized three football leagues: A Lyga (the highest), 1 Lyga (second-tier), and 2 Lyga (third-tier), which comprised several regional zones.

== A Lyga ==
Pos	Team	Pld	W	D	L	GF	GA	GD	Pts	Qualification or relegation
1	FBK Kaunas (C)	36	26	7	3	76	13	+63	85	Qualification to Champions League first qualifying round
2	Atlantas	36	19	12	5	66	29	+37	69	Qualification to UEFA Cup qualifying round
3	Žalgiris	36	20	9	7	64	39	+25	69	Qualification to UEFA Cup qualifying round
4	Ekranas	36	15	10	11	58	38	+20	55	Qualification to Intertoto Cup first round
5	Inakaras	36	11	12	13	50	44	+6	45	
6	Geležinis Vilkas	36	10	6	20	42	69	−27	36	
7	Nevėžis	36	8	11	17	33	54	−21	35	
8	Sakalas	36	7	13	16	32	61	−29	34	
9	Vėtra (R)	36	7	11	18	32	57	−25	32	Relegation to 1 Lyga
10	Dainava (R)	36	7	9	20	34	83	−49	30	Relegation to 1 Lyga

Source: RSSSF.com
(C) Champions; (R) Relegated

== 1 Lyga ==
Pos	Team	Pld	W	D	L	GF	GA	GD	Pts
1	Polonija Vilnius	30	27	0	3	97	16	+81	81
2	Sūduva Marijampolė	30	22	1	7	93	42	+51	67
3	Kauno Jėgeriai	30	19	5	6	83	30	+53	62
4	Tauras Tauragė	30	17	7	6	57	39	+18	58
5	Lietava Jonava	30	16	4	10	70	40	+30	52
6	Žalgiris-2 Vilnius	30	11	7	12	37	35	+2	40
7	Interas Visaginas	30	11	6	13	29	38	−9	39
8	Vienybė Ukmergė	30	11	5	14	54	67	−13	38
9	Kareda Kaunas	30	10	5	15	35	49	−14	35
10	Babrungas Plungė	30	9	7	14	34	60	−26	34
11	Nevėžis-2 Kėdainiai	30	11	1	18	45	62	−17	34
12	Laisvė Šilutė	30	10	4	16	44	59	−15	34
13	Krazantė Kelmė	30	11	1	18	38	81	−43	34
14	Banga Gargždai	30	10	3	17	45	50	−5	33
15	Utenis Utena	30	7	4	19	30	69	−39	25
16	Kratonas Kalvarija	30	7	2	21	51	105	−54	23

== 2 Lyga ==
=== 2 Lyga zone East ===
Pos	Team	Pld	W	D	L	GF	GA	GD	Pts
1	Ekranas-2 Panevėžys	14	11	2	1	76	8	+68	35
2	Širvinta Širvintos	14	10	3	1	40	23	+17	33
3	Vėtra-2 Rūdiškės	14	8	2	4	47	17	+30	26
4	Delintra Lentvaris	14	8	1	5	40	27	+13	25
5	FK Anykščiai	14	6	0	8	29	31	−2	18
6	FM (LOSC) Vilnius	14	4	2	8	23	19	+4	14
7	FM-86 Panevėžys	14	2	0	12	10	72	−62	6
8	ZEV-Klevas Vilnius	14	2	0	12	12	80	−68	6

=== 2 Lyga zone South ===
Pos	Team	Pld	W	D	L	GF	GA	GD	Pts
1	Atletas Kaunas	14	10	3	1	65	15	+50	33
2	Savingė Kaišiadorys	14	9	4	1	40	9	+31	31
3	Sveikata Kybartai	14	7	5	2	38	22	+16	26
4	Lietava-2 Jonava	14	7	1	6	27	38	−11	22
5	Šešupė Vilkaviškis	14	3	3	8	32	44	−12	12
6	Šilas Kazlų Rūda	14	4	0	10	15	54	−39	12
7	Mituva Jurbarkas	14	3	2	9	12	31	−19	11
8	SM Prienai	14	3	2	9	24	39	−15	11

=== 2 Lyga zone West ===
Pos	Team	Pld	W	D	L	GF	GA	GD	Pts
1	Nafta Mažeikiai	20	15	5	0	71	20	+51	50
2	Širvėna Biržai	20	13	6	1	49	19	+30	45
3	Mastis Telšiai	20	13	3	4	77	19	+58	42
4	Gintaras Palanga	20	9	2	9	54	32	+22	29
5	Atlantas-2 Klaipėda	20	7	7	6	40	28	+12	28
6	Juventa-99 Šiauliai	20	7	6	7	27	31	−4	27
7	Sakalas-2 Šiauliai	20	7	2	11	26	39	−13	23
8	Venta Kuršėnai	20	6	4	10	36	62	−26	22
9	Kruoja Pakruojis	20	6	2	12	28	47	−19	20
10	FK Akmenė	20	2	5	13	17	68	−51	11
11	FK Pasvalys	20	2	4	14	26	86	−60	10
