= Giedrius Barevičius =

Lithuanian footballer

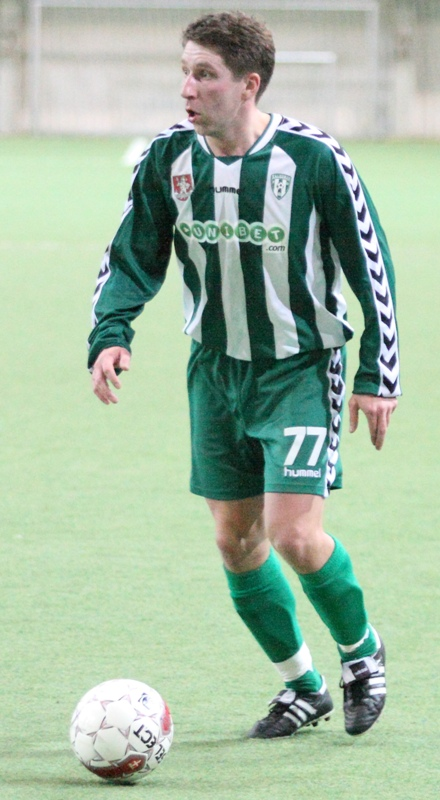

Personal information
- Full name: Giedrius Barevičius
- Date of birth: 9 August 1976 (age 50)
- Place of birth: Vilnius, Lithuania
- Height: 1.75 m (5 ft 9 in)
- Position: Midfielder

Senior career*
Years	Team	Apps	(Gls)
1993–1997	FK Panerys Vilnius	67	(3)
1998–2002	Žalgiris Vilnius	94	(31)
2003–2007	FBK Kaunas	92	(18)
2008–2009	Sūduva Marijampolė	24	(1)
2009–2010	Atlantis FC		
2010–2012	Žalgiris Vilnius		
2012–2016	FK Lokomativas Radviliskis	94	(9)

International career
1996–2004	Lithuania	9	(0)

Managerial career
- 2022-: FK Transinvest
- * Club domestic league appearances and goals

Giedrius Barevičius (born 9 August 1976) is a Lithuanian footballer, who played for FK Žalgiris Vilnius and FBK Kaunas.
