= FK Sakalas Šiauliai =

FK Sakalas Šiauliai may refer to the following association football teams based or formerly based in Šiauliai, Lithuania:

- FK Kareda Kaunas, known as Sakalas Šiauliai between 1990 and 1995
- FK Klevas, after re-branding known as Sakalas Šiauliai between 2001 and 2004
