= Povilas Lukšys (footballer) =

Lithuanian footballer

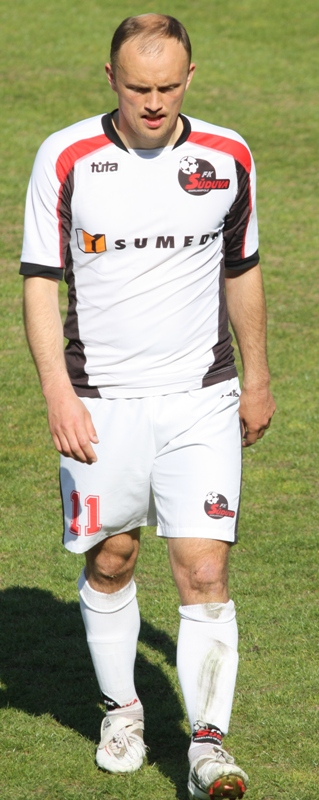
- Lukšys playing for FK Sūduva Marijampolė

Personal information
- Full name: Povilas Lukšys
- Date of birth: 7 July 1979 (age 47)
- Place of birth: Perloja, Lithuanian SSR, Soviet Union (now Republic of Lithuania)
- Height: 1.77 m (5 ft 10 in)
- Position: Striker

Senior career*
Years	Team	Apps	(Gls)
1995–1996	JR Alsa Vilnius	12	(1)
1995–2007	Ekranas	334	(132)
2008–2009	Sūduva	43	(20)
2009–2010	Polonia Bytom	2	(0)
2010–2012	Sūduva	36	(29)
2013	Wigry Suwałki	15	(3)
2013	Daugava Rīga	14	(9)
2014	Wigry Suwałki	11	(1)
2014	Utenis Utena		
2015–2017	Panevėžys		

International career
2006–2009	Lithuania	4	(0)
- * Club domestic league appearances and goals

Povilas Lukšys (born 7 July 1979) is a Lithuanian former professional footballer who played as a striker.

He signed for FK Ekranas during the 1995–96 season. In 2005, Lukšys helped FK Ekranas to win the A Lyga. Throughout the season he scored 19 goals and was the 3rd top scorer in the league. In 2006, Ekranas finished second, placing behind champions FBK Kaunas. During the 2006 season, Lukšys scored 13 goals was the 6th top scorer. In July 2013, Lukšys joined Latvian Higher League club Daugava Rīga. With 12 goals in 14 league matches he became the club's top scorer and helped Daugava Rīga reach its best success in the history of the club finishing the league in the top four. In March 2014, Lukšys moved to Polish I liga club Wigry Suwałki.

Lukšys has made four appearances for the Lithuania national football team.

== Honours ==
Ekranas

- A Lyga: 2005
- Lithuanian Cup: 1997–98, 1999–2000

Wigry Suwałki

- II liga East: 2013–14

Individual

- A Lyga top scorer: 2004, 2007, 2010
