= 2002 Lithuanian football leagues =

LFF Lyga
- Season: 2002

Final tables of the Lithuanian Championship in 2002 are presented below. The Lithuanian Football Federation (LFF) organized three football leagues: A Lyga (the highest), 1 Lyga (second-tier), and 2 Lyga (third-tier), which comprised four regional zones, with a new North zone being added for this season.

== A Lyga ==
Pos	Team	Pld	W	D	L	GF	GA	GD	Pts	Qualification or relegation
1	FBK Kaunas (C)	32	24	6	2	85	20	+65	78	Qualification to Champions League first qualifying round
2	Atlantas	32	20	7	5	58	23	+35	67	Qualification to UEFA Cup qualifying round
3	Ekranas	32	16	7	9	43	25	+18	55	Qualification to UEFA Cup qualifying round
4	Žalgiris	32	12	11	9	46	37	+9	47	Qualification to Intertoto Cup first round
5	Inkaras (R)	32	13	7	12	34	29	+5	46	Defunct after end of season
6	Sūduva	32	11	8	13	44	50	−6	41	
7	Sakalas	32	8	10	14	30	56	−26	34	
8	Geležinis Vilkas (R)	32	4	6	22	26	75	−49	18	Qualification to Relegation play-offs
9	Nevėžis (R)	32	2	6	24	19	70	−51	12	Relegation to 1 Lyga

Source: RSSSF.com
(C) Champions; (R) Relegated

== LFF 1 Lyga ==
Pos	Team	Pld	W	D	L	GF	GA	GD	Pts
1	Vėtra Rūdiškės	30	27	2	1	131	12	+119	83
2	Polonija Vilnius	30	23	5	2	80	15	+65	74
3	Kauno Jėgeriai	30	18	6	6	69	15	+54	60
4	Šviesa Vilnius	30	15	8	7	41	35	+6	53
5	Tauras Tauragė	30	12	11	7	52	34	+18	47
6	Laisvė Šilutė	30	14	2	14	49	51	−2	44
7	Dainava Alytus	30	10	10	10	51	49	+2	40
8	Lietava Jonava	30	10	8	12	46	59	−13	38
9	Atletas Kaunas	30	9	8	13	31	39	−8	35
10	Kareda Kaunas	30	8	11	11	34	49	−15	35
11	Žalgiris-2 Vilnius	30	10	2	18	39	57	−18	32
12	Babrungas Plungė	30	8	8	14	41	66	−25	32
13	Vienybė Ukmergė	30	7	10	13	32	57	−25	31
14	Interas-AE Visaginas	30	7	6	17	43	78	−35	27
15	Nafta Mažeikiai	30	5	7	18	43	92	−49	22
16	Nevėžis-2 Kėdainiai	30	2	6	22	30	103	−73	12

== LFF 2 Lyga ==
=== LFF 2 Lyga zone East ===
Pos	Team	Pld	W	D	L	GF	GA	GD	Pts
1	Vėtra-2 Rudiskės	12	11	0	1	61	8	+53	33
2	Utenis Utena	12	9	2	1	37	8	+29	29
3	Širvinta Širvintos	12	5	2	5	30	27	+3	17
4	FK Anykščiai	12	5	2	5	29	23	+6	17
5	FM Vilnius	12	5	1	6	17	21	−4	16
6	Vienybė-2 Ukmergė	12	2	0	10	21	51	−30	6
7	KKSC Visaginas	12	1	1	10	9	66	−57	4

=== LFF 2 Lyga zone South ===
Pos	Team	Pld	W	D	L	GF	GA	GD	Pts
1	Kvintencija Kaunas	16	11	3	2	47	17	+30	36
2	Savingė Kaišiadorys	16	11	3	2	39	22	+17	36
3	Dvyniai Alytus	16	10	1	5	53	26	+27	31
4	Sūduva-2 Marijampolė	16	8	3	5	41	23	+18	27
5	Lietava-2 Jonava	16	8	1	7	27	31	−4	25
6	Sveikata Kybartai	16	5	1	10	33	38	−5	16
7	SM Prienai	16	4	3	9	24	43	−19	15
8	Šilas Kazlų Rūda	16	4	0	12	23	48	−25	12
9	Mituva Jurbarkas	16	2	3	11	9	48	−39	9

=== LFF 2 Lyga zone West ===
Pos	Team	Pld	W	D	L	GF	GA	GD	Pts
1	Banga Gargždai	14	12	1	1	43	6	+37	37
2	Rodovitas Klaipėda	14	10	2	2	42	17	+25	32
3	Tauras-2 Tauragė	14	8	4	2	35	17	+18	28
4	Gintaras Palanga	14	6	2	6	42	30	+12	20
5	Sakuona Plikiai	14	5	4	5	34	25	+9	19
6	Minija Kretinga	14	4	3	7	18	35	−17	15
7	SM Laisvė-2 Šilutė	14	1	2	11	18	64	−46	5
8	Salantas Salantai	14	0	2	12	6	44	−38	2

=== LFF 2 Lyga zone North ===
Pos	Team	Pld	W	D	L	GF	GA	GD	Pts
1	Ekranas-2 Panevėžys	18	13	3	2	69	17	+52	42
2	Venta Kuršėnai	18	12	2	4	47	28	+19	38
3	Mastis Telšiai	18	11	4	3	43	28	+15	37
4	Širvena Biržai	18	10	3	5	33	24	+9	33
5	Universitetas Šiauliai	18	8	6	4	39	25	+14	30
6	Kražantė Kelmė	18	6	4	8	31	40	−9	22
7	Juventa-99 Šiauliai	18	3	7	8	25	30	−5	16
8	Kruoja Pakruojis	18	4	3	11	20	33	−13	15
9	FK Pasvalys	18	3	5	10	29	46	−17	14
10	Babrungas-2 Plungė	18	0	3	15	5	70	−65	3
