= Andrius Puotkalis =

Lithuanian footballer

Personal information
- Full name: Andrius Puotkalis
- Date of birth: 6 October 1980 (age 46)
- Place of birth: Lithuania
- Height: 1.84 m (6 ft 1/2 in)
- Position: Midfielder

Senior career*
Years	Team	Apps	(Gls)
1996–1998	Inkaras Kaunas	39	(13)
1999	Žalgiris Vilnius	13	(6)
2000	Kareda Kaunas	19	(3)
2000–2003	FBK Kaunas	82	(16)
2004–2005	FK Atlantas	30	(5)
2006–2008	Žalgiris Vilnius	42	(4)
2009	FK Tauras Tauragė	14	(1)
2010–2011	Aleksotas Kaunas		

International career^{‡}
1999–2002	Lithuania	3	(0)
- * Club domestic league appearances and goals as of 11 September 2020 ‡ National team caps and goals as of 11 September 2020

Andrius Puotkalis (born 6 October 1980) is a Lithuanian professional footballer. He was playing the position of midfielder and is 1.84 m tall. He is a former member of the Lithuania national football team.
