= 1995–96 A Lyga =

A Lyga
- Season: 1995–96
- Champions: Inkaras-Grifas Kaunas
- Relegated: JR Alsa-Panerys; JR Klaipeda
- UEFA Cup: Inkaras-Grifas Kaunas; FK Zalgiris
- UEFA Cup Winner's Cup: Kareda-Sakalas
- UEFA Intertoto Cup: FBK Kaunas

The Lithuanian A Lyga 1995–96 was the sixth season of top-tier football in Lithuania. The season started on 13 July 1995 and ended on 16 June 1996. It was contested by 15 teams, and Inkaras-Grifas Kaunas won the championship.

== Regular season ==
=== Standings ===
Pos	Team	Pld	W	D	L	GF	GA	GD	Pts	Qualification
1	Žalgiris	14	13	1	0	63	7	+56	40	Qualification to championship round
2	Inkaras-Grifas	14	12	2	0	37	7	+30	38	Qualification to championship round
3	Kareda-Sakalas	14	11	0	3	35	10	+25	33	Qualification to championship round
4	Aras	14	10	1	3	31	10	+21	31	Qualification to championship round
5	FBK Kaunas	14	9	1	4	33	15	+18	28	Qualification to championship round
6	Panerys	14	8	0	6	28	16	+12	24	Qualification to championship round
7	Ekranas	14	6	2	6	29	25	+4	20	Qualification to championship round
8	Žalgiris-2	14	5	3	6	22	21	+1	18	Qualification to championship round
9	JR Klaipėda	14	5	1	8	12	25	−13	16	Qualification to relegation round
10	Banga	14	3	3	8	14	33	−19	12	Qualification to relegation round
11	Lokomotyvas	14	3	3	8	13	25	−12	12	Qualification to relegation round
12	Tauras	14	3	1	10	8	45	−37	10	Qualification to relegation round
13	Mastis	14	2	3	9	15	40	−25	9	Qualification to relegation round
14	Ukmergė	14	2	3	9	7	34	−27	9	Qualification to relegation round
15	Alsa-Panerys	14	1	0	13	4	38	−34	3	Qualification to relegation round

Source: RSSSF.com

=== Results ===
Home \ Away	ALS	ARA	BAN	EKR	FBK	INK	KLA	KAR	LOK	MAS	PAN	TAU	UKM	ŽAL	ŽL2
Alsa-Panerys			2–1			0–1		1–3		0–6	0–2		0–2		0–3
Aras	1–0				2–0	1–2			0–0			5–0	4–0		1–0
Banga		0–3				2–4		0–5		1–1		1–1	2–1		2–1
Ekranas	3–0	2–1	3–2						3–2	2–0		7–0			2–2
FBK Kaunas	2–0		3–0	3–1			1–2		3–0		2–1			1–2	
Inkaras-Grifas				2–1	0–0		2–0	3–1		5–1	3–0			0–0	
JR Klaipėda	2–0	0–5	1–1	2–1					1–2		0–3	2–0			
Kareda-Sakalas		0–2		2–1	3–2		3–0				2–0		2–0	0–1	
Lokomotyvas	2–1		1–2			1–3		0–1			0–2		0–0		1–1
Mastis		1–3			1–4		0–1	0–4	1–2				0–0	1–14	
Panerys		0–2	3–0	2–1						2–0		6–0		2–3	1–3
Tauras	1–0				2–4	0–4		0–6	2–0	0–1			2–0		
Ukmergė				2–2	0–2	0–6	2–1				0–4			0–4	0–5
Žalgiris	9–0	5–1	4–0	5–0			3–0		5–2			7–0			
Žalgiris-2					1–6	0–2	2–0	0–3		2–2		2–0		0–1	

Legend: Blue = home team win; Yellow = draw; Red = away team win.

== Championship round ==
=== Standings ===
Pos	Team	Pld	W	D	L	GF	GA	GD	Pts	Qualification
1	Inkaras-Grifas (C)	14	12	1	1	30	2	+28	56	Qualification to UEFA Cup preliminary round
2	Kareda-Sakalas	14	11	2	1	32	7	+25	52	Qualification to Cup Winners' Cup qualifying round
3	Žalgiris	14	9	3	2	43	15	+28	50	Qualification to UEFA Cup preliminary round
4	FBK Kaunas	14	5	2	7	15	20	−5	31	Qualification to Intertoto Cup group stage
5	Panerys	14	5	2	7	12	31	−19	29	
6	Atlantas	14	2	3	9	11	24	−13	25	
7	Ekranas	14	1	6	7	10	21	−11	19	
8	Žalgiris-2	14	0	3	11	6	39	−33	12	

Source: RSSSF.com
(C) Champions

=== Results ===
Home \ Away	ARA	EKR	FBK	INK	KAR	PAN	ŽAL	ŽL2
Aras		1–1	1–3	0–2	0–1	1–2	3–4	2–0
Ekranas	0–1		2–2	0–2	0–1	1–0	1–1	1–1
FBK Kaunas	1–0	1–1		0–1	0–1	1–0	0–1	2–0
Inkaras-Grifas	1–0	2–0	2–0		0–0	4–0	2–0	5–0
Kareda-Sakalas	3–0	3–1	5–2	1–0		4–1	1–1	3–0
Panerys	1–1	1–0	2–1	0–3	0–7		2–2	1–0
Žalgiris	5–1	3–0	3–0	1–3	2–1	5–0		9–1
Žalgiris-2	0–0	2–2	1–2	0–3	0–1	1–2	0–6	

Legend: Blue = home team win; Yellow = draw; Red = away team win.

== Relegation round ==
=== Standings ===
Pos	Team	Pld	W	D	L	GF	GA	GD	Pts	Relegation
9	Banga	12	8	2	2	17	11	+6	32	
10	Lokomotyvas	12	8	0	4	24	11	+13	30	
11	Tauras	12	5	6	1	9	3	+6	26	
12	Ukmergė	12	5	2	5	18	15	+3	22	
13	Mastis	12	2	5	5	13	14	−1	16	
14	Alsa-Panerys (R)	12	2	6	4	9	10	−1	14	Relegation to 1 Lyga
15	JR Klaipėda (R)	12	0	3	9	3	29	−26	11	Relegation to 1 Lyga

Source: RSSSF.com
(R) Relegated

=== Results ===
Home \ Away	ALS	BAN	KLA	LOK	MAS	TAU	UKM
Alsa-Panerys		0–0	1–1	0–1	1–1	0–1	2–1
Banga	2–1		1–0	3–2	1–1	1–0	1–0
JR Klaipėda	0–2	0–1		0–5	0–5	0–0	0–2
Lokomotyvas	1–0	1–2	4–1		2–0	0–1	4–1
Mastis	0–0	0–3	3–0	1–3		1–1	0–1
Tauras	1–1	1–0	0–0	2–0	0–0		2–0
Ukmergė	1–1	5–2	5–1	0–1	2–1	0–0	

Legend: Blue = home team win; Yellow = draw; Red = away team win.
