= Šilutė Stadium =

Sports venue in Šilutė, Lithuania

Coordinates: 55°20′12″N 21°28′59″E

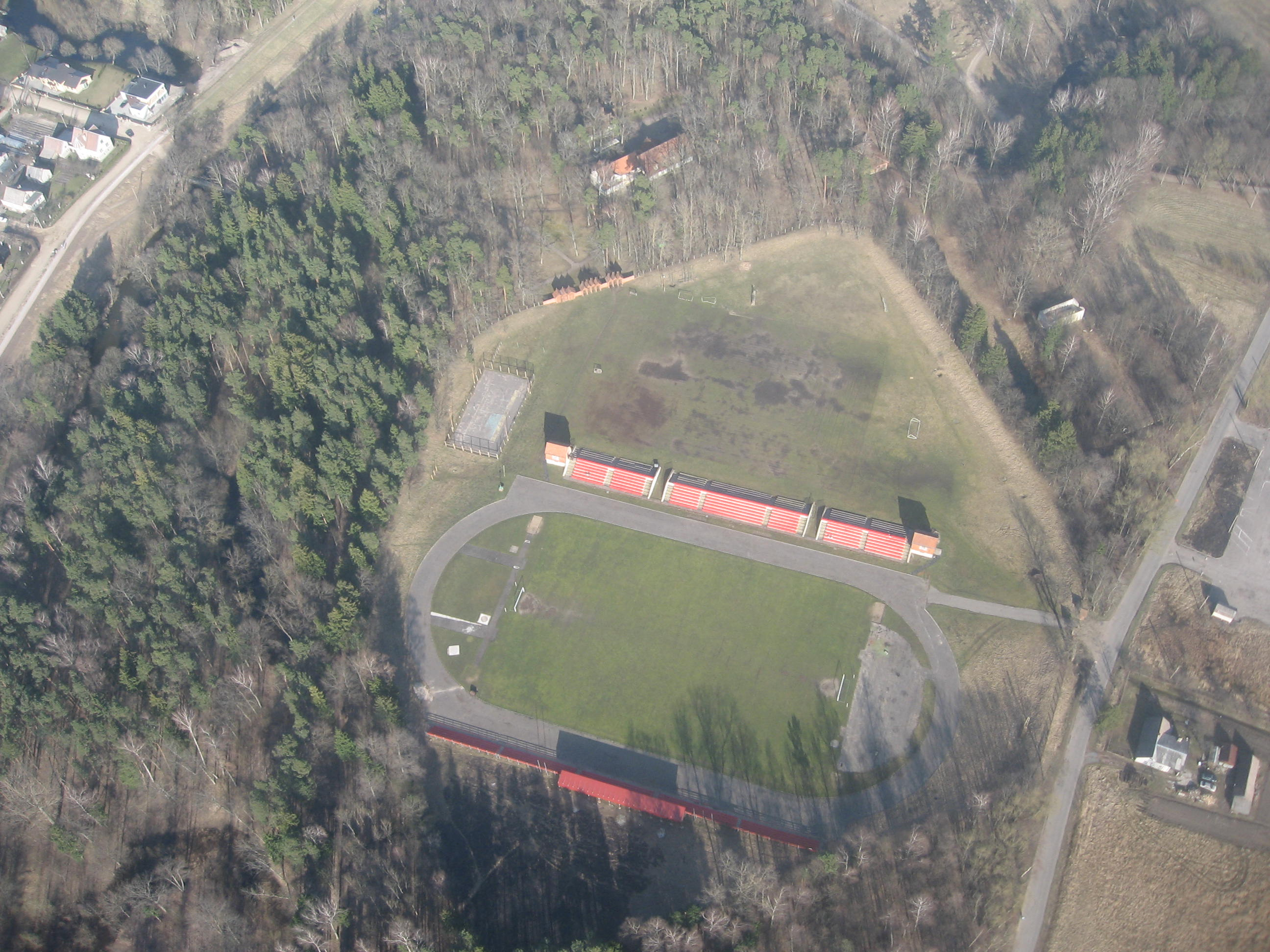
Šilutė Stadium

Šilutė Stadium is a multi-use stadium in Šilutė, Lithuania. It is currently used mostly for football matches by FK Šilutė. The capacity of the stadium is 3,000 people. The reconstruction to meet all UEFA requirements lasted a year and a half and was completed in 2005. First official match was played on July 23, 2005.
