= 1996–97 A Lyga =

A Lyga
- Season: 1996–97
- Champions: Kareda Siauliai
- Relegated: FK Ukmerge; Panerys-2
- UEFA Champions League: Kareda Siauliai
- UEFA CUP: FK Inkaras Kaunas
- UEFA Cup Winner's Cup: FK Zalgiris
- UEFA Intertoto Cup: FBK Kaunas

The Lithuanian A Lyga 1996–97 was the seventh season of top-tier football in Lithuania. The season started on 13 July 1996 and ended on 22 June 1997. It was contested by 16 teams, and Kareda Šiauliai won the championship.

== Group A ==
=== Standings ===
Pos	Team	Pld	W	D	L	GF	GA	GD	Pts	Qualification
1	Kareda Šiauliai (C)	28	19	7	2	61	12	+49	64	Qualification to Champions League first qualifying round
2	Žalgiris	28	17	5	6	56	19	+37	56	Qualification to Cup Winners' Cup qualifying round
3	Inkaras	28	15	8	5	41	19	+22	53	Qualification to UEFA Cup first qualifying round
4	FBK Kaunas	28	12	5	11	33	31	+2	41	Qualification to Intertoto Cup group stage
5	Ekranas	28	8	10	10	28	32	−4	34	
6	Panerys	28	6	8	14	20	40	−20	26	
7	Atlantas	28	4	6	18	21	66	−45	18	
8	Žalgiris-Volmeta	28	3	7	18	19	60	−41	16	

Source: RSSSF.com
(C) Champions

=== Results ===
==== First half of season ====
Home \ Away	ATL	EKR	FBK	INK	KAR	PAN	ŽAL	ŽVL
Atlantas		1–1	1–2	0–3	1–3	0–1	1–7	2–1
Ekranas	2–2		1–0	0–0	0–3	3–3	0–2	0–0
FBK Kaunas	3–0	1–1		0–3	0–1	4–1	1–0	4–1
Inkaras	0–1	0–0	2–1		3–1	1–0	1–1	3–0
Kareda Šiauliai	6–0	1–1	2–0	0–0		2–0	2–0	5–0
Panerys	0–1	1–2	1–1	1–2	0–3		0–5	1–0
Žalgiris	6–0	1–0	1–2	1–1	0–0	4–1		4–0
Zalgiris-Volmeta	2–2	2–1	0–1	0–3	1–1	1–1	1–5	

Legend: Blue = home team win; Yellow = draw; Red = away team win.

==== Second half of season ====
Home \ Away	ATL	EKR	FBK	INK	KAR	PAN	ŽAL	ŽVL
Atlantas		2–3	1–2	1–1	0–5	0–3	0–3	2–2
Ekranas	2–0		3–0	2–1	2–1	0–1	0–0	3–0
FBK Kaunas	3–1	1–1		0–1	0–0	0–0	1–2	2–1
Inkaras	1–0	2–0	0–2		3–1	1–0	1–1	7–1
Kareda Šiauliai	2–1	3–0	2–0	2–0		5–0	3–0	2–0
Panerys	0–0	1–0	0–1	0–0	0–2		0–0	3–0
Žalgiris	2–0	1–0	2–1	2–1	0–1	1–0		2–0
Žalgiris-Volmeta	0–1	2–0	2–0	-:+ (Note: The match between Žalgiris-Volmeta and Inkaras was counted as a goalless win for Inkaras-Grifas.)	1–1	1–1	0–3	

Legend: Blue = home team win; Yellow = draw; Red = away team win.

== Group B ==
=== Standings ===
Pos	Team	Pld	W	D	L	GF	GA	GD	Pts	Relegation
9	Lokomotyvas	26	15	8	3	44	13	+31	53	
10	Ranga-Politechnika	26	14	8	4	27	9	+18	50	
11	Mastis	26	13	4	9	29	24	+5	43	
12	Banga	26	12	6	8	35	22	+13	42	
13	Tauras	26	10	2	14	24	33	−9	32	
14	Interas-AE	26	7	4	15	26	37	−11	25	
15	Ukmergė (Note: Retired during the season and relegated) (R)	14	5	3	6	13	13	0	18	Relegation to 1 Lyga
16	Panerys-2 (Note: Relegated) (R)	26	3	3	20	14	61	−47	12	Relegation to 1 Lyga

Source: RSSSF.com
(R) Relegated

=== Results ===
==== First half of season ====
Home \ Away	BAN	IAE	LOK	MAS	PN2	RAN	TAU	UKM
Banga		1–0	1–1	0–1	2–0	3–0	1–2	1–0
Interas-AE	2–1		1–3	1–2	3–0	0–0	2–1	0–1
Lokomotyvas	1–1	4–1		2–0	2–0	0–0	3–0	1–0
Mastis	2–1	3–0	2–1		2–0	2–1	2–0	2–2
Panerys-2	0–1	4–2	1–6	0–2		0–3	0–1	0–0
Ranga-Politechnika	1–0	2–0	1–0	1–0	3–0		3–0	1–0
Tauras	0–3	3–0	0–1	2–0	4–0	0–1		1–0
Ukmergė	0–1	1–4	2–1	4–0	1–1	1–0	1–0	

Legend: Blue = home team win; Yellow = draw; Red = away team win.

==== Second half of season ====
Home \ Away	BAN	IAE	LOK	MAS	PN2	RAN	TAU
Banga		+:- (Note: The match between Banga and Interas-AE was counted as a goalless win for Banga.)	1–2	2–0	5–2	0–1	2–1
Interas-AE	1–1		1–3	2–1	0–1	0–0	3–0
Lokomotyvas	0–0	2–0		0–0	3–0	0–0	5–1
Mastis	2–1	0–0	0–2		4–0	0–0	1–0
Panerys-2	1–4	1–3	0–0	0–1		0–3	1–2
Ranga-Politechnika	1–1	1–0	0–0	1–0	1–2		2–0
Tauras	1–1	1–0	0–1	1–0	3–0	0–0	

Legend: Blue = home team win; Yellow = draw; Red = away team win.
