= Martin Opic =

Czech football player (born 1977)

Personal information
- Date of birth: 28 September 1977 (age 49)
- Place of birth: Czechoslovakia
- Height: 1.90 m (6 ft 3 in)
- Position: Forward

Team information
- Current team: FC Hlučín

Senior career*
Years	Team	Apps	(Gls)
2002	Bohemians 1905	4	(0)
2002	Semice		
2003–2004	FBK Kaunas		
2005	FK Ústí nad Labem		
- Jakubčovice Fotbal
2008–2011	MFK Karviná	64	(29)
2011–	FC Hlučín		
- * Club domestic league appearances and goals as of 1 July 2011

Martin Opic (born 28 September 1977) is a Czech football player who currently plays for FC Hlučín.

Opic played in the first qualifying round of the 2003–04 UEFA Champions League, scoring as a substitute in a 1–0 first leg win for FBK Kaunas away to HB Tórshavn. He started the second leg, scoring again in a 4–1 home win.

Opic signed for Hlučín in 2011, arriving from Karviná.

Being originally a professional firefighter, Opic travelled to the World Police and Fire Games in August 2011 to represent the Czech Republic.
