= Audrius Kšanavičius =

Lithuanian footballer

Personal information
- Date of birth: 28 January 1977 (age 49)
- Place of birth: Lithuania
- Height: 1.70 m (5 ft 7 in)
- Position: Midfielder

Team information
- Current team: FBK Kaunas

Senior career*
| Years | Team | Apps | (Gls) |
| 1994–2001 | FBK Kaunas | 161 | (45) |
| 2001–2004 | Skonto Riga | 36 | (9) |
| 2004–2008 | FBK Kaunas | 41 | (2) |
| 2005 | → Atlantas (loan) | 8 | (1) |
| 2007–2008 | → Hearts (loan) | 22 | (1) |
| 2008–2009 | Hearts | 9 | (1) |
| 2009–2009 | FBK Kaunas | ? | (?) |
- FK Kauno Žalgiris

International career^{‡}
| 1997–2008 | Lithuania | 19 | (2) |
- * Club domestic league appearances and goals as of 16 February 2011 ‡ National team caps and goals as of 16 February 2011

Audrius Kšanavičius (born 28 January 1977) is a footballer who plays for FBK Kaunas as a midfielder.

== Career ==
A left winger, Kšanavičius began his career with FBK Kaunas in 1994, making over 150 appearances before moving to Latvian champions Skonto Riga in 2001. After three seasons with Skonto he returned to FBK Kaunas. He spent the 2005 season on loan to Atlantas Klaipėda. He joined Scottish Premier League club Hearts on a six-month loan in July 2007 after featuring in the club's 3–1 friendly defeat by FC Barcelona. He scored his first league goal for Hearts in a 4–2 win over Falkirk on 6 October. On 11 March 2008, he signed a new contract that extended his loan at Hearts until June 2009, before joining the club permanently in the summer. On 3 August, Kšanavičius scored the only goal of a 1–0 pre-season friendly win for Hearts over Premier League new boys Hull, and then six days later he scored his second league goal for Hearts as they beat Motherwell 3–2. On 8 January 2009, having found himself out of favour under Csaba László, Hearts announced that Kšanavičius had returned to FBK Kaunas after 18 months with the Tynecastle club.

== International goals ==
Scores and results list. Lithuania's goal tally first.

| # | Date | Venue | Opponent | Score | Result | Competition |
|---|---|---|---|---|---|---|
| 1. | 21 November 2007 | Boris Paichadze Stadium, Tbilisi, Georgia | Georgia | 1–0 | 2–0 | UEFA Euro 2008 Qualifying |
| 2. | 21 November 2007 | Boris Paichadze Stadium, Tbilisi, Georgia | Georgia | 2–0 | 2–0 | UEFA Euro 2008 Qualifying |
