= 2004 A Lyga =

A Lyga
- Season: 2004
- Dates: 18 April-7 November
- Champions: FBK Kaunas
- UEFA Champions League: FBK Kaunas
- UEFA Cup: FK Ekranas; FK Atlantas
- UEFA Intertoto Cup: FK Zalgiris; FK Vetra

The Lithuanian A Lyga 2004 was the 15th season of top-tier football in Lithuania. The season started on 18 April 2004 and ended on 7 November 2004. 8 teams participated with FBK Kaunas winning the championship.

== League standings ==
Pos	Team	Pld	W	D	L	GF	GA	GD	Pts	Qualification
1	FBK Kaunas (C)	28	20	5	3	49	19	+30	65	Qualification to Champions League first qualifying round
2	Ekranas	28	20	2	6	59	22	+37	62	Qualification to UEFA Cup first qualifying round
3	Atlantas	28	15	5	8	36	29	+7	50	Qualification to UEFA Cup first qualifying round
4	Žalgiris	28	10	7	11	32	38	−6	37	Qualification to Intertoto Cup first round
5	Vėtra	28	9	8	11	29	33	−4	35	Qualification to Intertoto Cup first round
6	Šilutė	28	6	7	15	34	44	−10	25	
7	Sūduva	28	5	7	16	31	55	−24	22	
8	Vilnius	28	4	5	19	19	49	−30	17	

Source: RSSSF.com
(C) Champions

== Results ==
=== First half of season ===
Home \ Away	ATL	EKR	FBK	SŪD	ŠIL	VĖT	VIL	ŽAL
Atlantas		2–1	0–1	2–1	2–0	2–0	0–1	1–0
Ekranas	1–0		1–0	5–0	0–1	2–2	3–0	4–0
FBK Kaunas	0–0	0–2		3–0	2–1	1–1	1–0	1–0
Sūduva	1–1	1–2	1–2		2–6	0–1	2–0	1–3
Šilutė	0–1	0–1	2–2	1–1		0–1	0–3	1–4
Vėtra	1–1	1–3	1–2	1–1	1–1		2–0	0–0
Vilnius	0–1	0–4	0–1	4–1	0–4	0–2		0–2
Žalgiris	0–0	3–1	0–0	3–1	1–0	0–0	0–0	

Legend: Blue = home team win; Yellow = draw; Red = away team win.

=== Second half of season ===
Home \ Away	ATL	EKR	FBK	SŪD	ŠIL	VĖT	VIL	ŽAL
Atlantas		1–0	1–2	0–1	5–3	2–1	3–2	1–0
Ekranas	3–0		0–2	4–3	1–0	2–0	4–1	3–1
FBK Kaunas	5–1	0–3		1–1	2–1	1–0	2–0	3–0
Sūduva	0–1	1–2	2–3		3–1	2–1	0–2	0–3
Šilutė	1–1	2–1	0–4	1–1		0–1	1–1	4–0
Vėtra	4–0	0–3	0–2	1–1	0–1		2–1	0–3
Vilnius	0–4	0–0	0–1	0–2	1–1	1–3		1–2
Žalgiris	0–3	1–3	1–5	1–1	2–1	1–2	1–1	

Legend: Blue = home team win; Yellow = draw; Red = away team win.

== See also ==
- 2004 LFF Lyga
