= 1999 A Lyga =

A Lyga
- Season: 1999
- Champions: FBK Kaunas
- UEFA Champions League: FBK Kaunas
- UEFA Cup: FK Zalgiris; FK Ekranas
- UEFA Intertoto Cup: FK Atlantas

The Lithuanian A Lyga 1999 was the tenth season of top-tier football in Lithuania. The season started on 5 July 1999 and ended on 6 November 1999. 10 teams participated, 3 fewer than the previous season, and Žalgiris Kaunas won the championship.

== League standings ==
Pos	Team	Pld	W	D	L	GF	GA	GD	Pts	Qualification or relegation
1	FBK Kaunas (C)	18	12	5	1	36	10	+26	41	Qualification to Champions League first qualifying round
2	Žalgiris	18	10	6	2	33	9	+24	36	Qualification to UEFA Cup qualifying round
3	Atlantas	18	9	6	3	34	24	+10	33	Qualification to Intertoto Cup first round
4	Kareda Šiauliai	18	9	3	6	31	18	+13	30	
5	Ekranas	18	7	8	3	22	11	+11	29	Qualification to UEFA Cup qualifying round
6	Inkaras	18	8	5	5	25	18	+7	29	
7	Nevėžis	18	3	7	8	10	22	−12	16	
8	Banga (O)	18	2	6	10	12	40	−28	12	Qualification to Relegation play-offs
9	Ardena (O)	18	2	5	11	10	26	−16	11	Qualification to Relegation play-offs
10	Dainava (Note: Dainava were initially relegated, but were later readmitted by LFF.)	18	1	3	14	9	44	−35	6	Relegation to 1 Lyga

Source: RSSSF.com
(C) Champions; (O) Play-off winners

== Results ==
Home \ Away	ARD	ATL	BAN	DAI	EKR	FBK	INK	KAR	NEV	ŽAL
Ardena		0–2	1–1	0–2	0–0	0–3	1–3	0–2	0–1	0–3
Atlantas	0–0		2–2	5–0	1–2	2–2	3–2	3–2	3–1	1–1
Banga	+:- (Note: The match between Banga and Ardena was rated with a goalless win for Banga.)	1–2		2–1	0–2	0–3	0–1	0–4	1–1	1–3
Dainava	1–3	1–2	2–2		0–4	0–1	0–2	0–4	0–0	0–0
Ekranas	1–0	1–2	1–1	4–1		0–0	0–0	1–0	0–0	0–0
FBK Kaunas	0–0	3–1	6–0	2–1	2–0		1–0	2–2	0–1	1–0
Inkaras	1–3	1–1	2–0	4–0	1–1	1–4		1–0	1–0	1–1
Kareda Šiauliai	1–0	0–0	3–0	3–0	0–3	2–4	1–1		3–1	0–1
Nevėžis	1–1	0–4	1–1	2–0	1–1	0–2	0–2	0–2		0–1
Žalgiris	4–1	5–0	5–0	4–0	2–1	0–0	2–1	1–2	0–0	

Legend: Blue = home team win; Yellow = draw; Red = away team win.

== Relegation play-off ==
Team 1	Agg.	Team 2	1st leg	2nd leg
Tauras	1–8	Banga	0–3	1–5
Geležinis Vilkas	1–1 (a)	Ardena	1–1	0–0
