= Mallal N'Diaye =

Malian footballer

Personal information
- Date of birth: 4 January 1971 (age 55)
- Height: 1.82 m (6 ft 0 in)
- Position: Forward

Senior career*
Years	Team	Apps	(Gls)
1996–1997	Pyunik		
1997	Yerevan	13	(8)
1997–1998	Lausanne-Sport	9	(3)
1999–2000	Djoliba AC		
2001	Pyunik	8	(3)
2002–2007	Djoliba AC		

International career
1999-2004	Mali	4	(0)
- * Club domestic league appearances and goals

Mallal N'Diaye (born 4 January 1971) is a Malian former professional footballer who played as a forward for Pyunik, Yerevan, Lausanne-Sport and Djoliba AC.

== Career statistics ==
=== International ===
Mali national team
Year	Apps	Goals
1999	0	0
2000	1	0
2001	1	0
2002	0	0
2002	0	0
2004	2	0
Total	4	0

Statistics accurate as of match played 10 October 2004
