= FK Interas Visaginas =

Lithuanian football club

FK Visaginas
- Full name: Futbolo Klubas Visaginas
Home colours

FK Visaginas (also previously Interas-AE) is a Lithuanian football team from Visaginas.

Before 2006, the club was fully amateur and many players of the team worked in an atomic plant.

Despite finishing in 8th place in the second division, the club was promoted to Lithuanian A Lyga 2007 season. All higher placed teams in the second division were either reserve teams or did not have stadiums suitable for top flight football. Interas then won a play-off match against Silute 4:3 on penalties to qualify for a spell in the top flight.

After promotion the club completely revamped its squad, mostly taking players on loan from FC Vilnius. But after a disastrous season the club failed to acquire A lyga license and was also denied participation in LFF I Lyga.

== Stadium ==
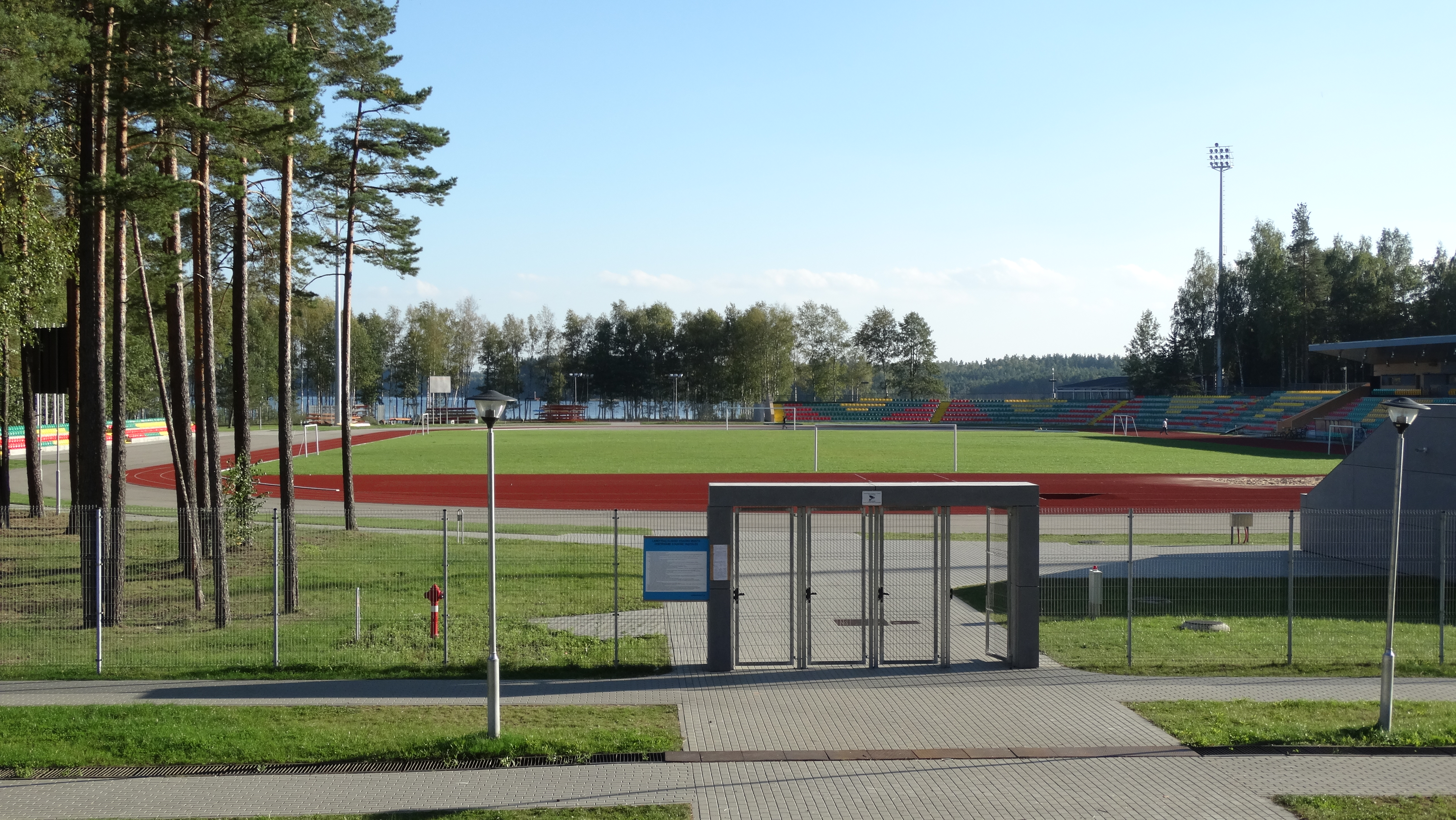
Visaginas Stadium prior to the 2023 renovations.

Interas Visaginas currently plays in the Visagino centrinis stadionas, a stadium with a capacity of 3,000 spectators.

=== 2014 reconstruction ===
The main Visaginas stadium had not been renovated since its construction and no longer met the functional and hygiene requirements of such a structure: there was no heating, water, sewage, changing rooms, etc. Running tracks with a special coating were built around the football field. Lighting poles with several lighting modes were installed, as well as the necessary scoreboards. The stadium met the international standards of the time and received the second category of UEFA.

=== 2023 reconstruction ===
In 2023, the clubs stadium was renovated. The grass on the main field was replaced by artificial turf. The stadium's standards were raised, and were met with the requirements of the UEFA Champions League and the Lithuanian A League. The stadium re-opened on September 4, 2023.

== Participation in Lithuanian Championships ==
- 2003 – 3rd (2 Lyga East)
- 2004 – 2nd (2 Lyga South)
- 2005 – 2nd (2 Lyga South)
- 2006 – 8th (I Lyga)
