= FC Vilnius =

Lithuanian association football club

- Full name: Football Club Vilnius
- Founded: 1974
- Dissolved: 2008
- Ground: Vėtra Vilnius Stadium
- Capacity: 5,030
Home colours	Away colours

FC Vilnius was a Lithuanian football club, playing in the capital city of Vilnius.

At first it was known under the name Šviesa. In 2003, the club made its debut in the Lithuanian top division. In 2007, the club went back to the second division, and in 2008, this club ceased to exist.

The club was founded in 1974 on the basis of the Lithuanian national youth team. Up to 1990 there were around 500 youths were training in the club's facilities. After Lithuanian's independence, the sports organisations underwent restructuring. In 2001 by the initiative of businessman Algimantas Breikštas the club was recreated as restored the club as „Šviesa“. The club played in A Lyga between 2003 and 2007. Since 2004 season the club was renamed to FC Vilnius. After a turmoil with player contracts in 2008 the club failed to qualify for A Lyga license, and fell apart. The owner of the club Algimantas Breikštas have seemingly lost interest in the club, turning his attention to invest into the ŁKS Łódź club in Poland. One of the most notable players to play for this club was Paulinho, who later went on to play for Barcelona.

== Participation in Lithuanian championships ==
- 2008 I Lyga – 5th
- 2007 A Lyga – 7th
- 2006 A Lyga – 7th
- 2005 A Lyga – 5th
- 2004 A Lyga – 8th
- 2003 A Lyga – 7th
- 2002 I Lyga – 4th
