= FK Geležinis Vilkas =

Lithuanian football club

- Full name: Vilniaus Geležinis Vilkas
- League: I Lyga

Vilniaus Geležinis Vilkas is a Lithuanian football club from Vilnius.

== Participation in Lithuanian Championships ==
- 2003 – 2nd (1 Lyga)
- 2004 – 4th (1 Lyga)
- 2005 – 5th (1 Lyga)
