= FK Dainava Alytus =

Lithuanian football club

FK Dainava
- Full name: Alytaus futbolo klubas Dainava
- Nickname(s): Dainava
- Founded: December 2010; 14 years ago
- Dissolved: 2014; 11 years ago
- Ground: Alytus Stadium
- Capacity: 3,790
- Website: http://www.fkdainava.com/
Home colours	Away colours

FK Dainava was a Lithuanian football club from Alytus. The club was established in 1935 as FK Alytis, before being renamed FK Dainava after a merger with FK Vidzgiris Alytus in December 2010.

== History ==
The roots of Dainava can be traced back to two predecessor clubs, FK Alytis and FK Vidzgiris.

FK Alytis Alytus were founded in 1935, apparently as the heir of a former club from Alytus also called "Alytis" which existed between 1965 and 2002. Alytis began play at the Lithuanian third level, from which they were immediately promoted in their very first season. The side soon established itself as one of the best teams of the I Lyga, winning the second-level championship in 2005 and 2007 and finishing as runners-up in 2006 and from 2008 to 2010. The club also participated in the UEFA Regions' Cup in 2007 and 2009.

FK Vidzgiris Alytus were founded in 2000. They were initially not as successful as their city rivals, beginning play in the lower Lithuanian leagues before being promoted to the third-level 2 Lyga for the 2005 season. After spending a couple of seasons near the top of the 2 Lyga, Vidzgiris were eventually granted a I Lyga licence for the 2010 season, in which the team finished in third place.

Both teams merged to form FK Dainava in December 2010 with the goal of successfully applying for a 2011 A Lyga licence. The licence was eventually granted in March 2011.

Team was not the first team to play as "Dainava", as there were several other, but unrelated teams who chose this name, with the earliest dating back to as far as 1935. However, of these teams, only the 1996–2003 incarnation managed to play at any top-level league, being members of the A Lyga between the 1998–99 and 2001 seasons.

After match fixing scandals and financial problems in the end of 2014, the team was dissolved.

== Stadium ==
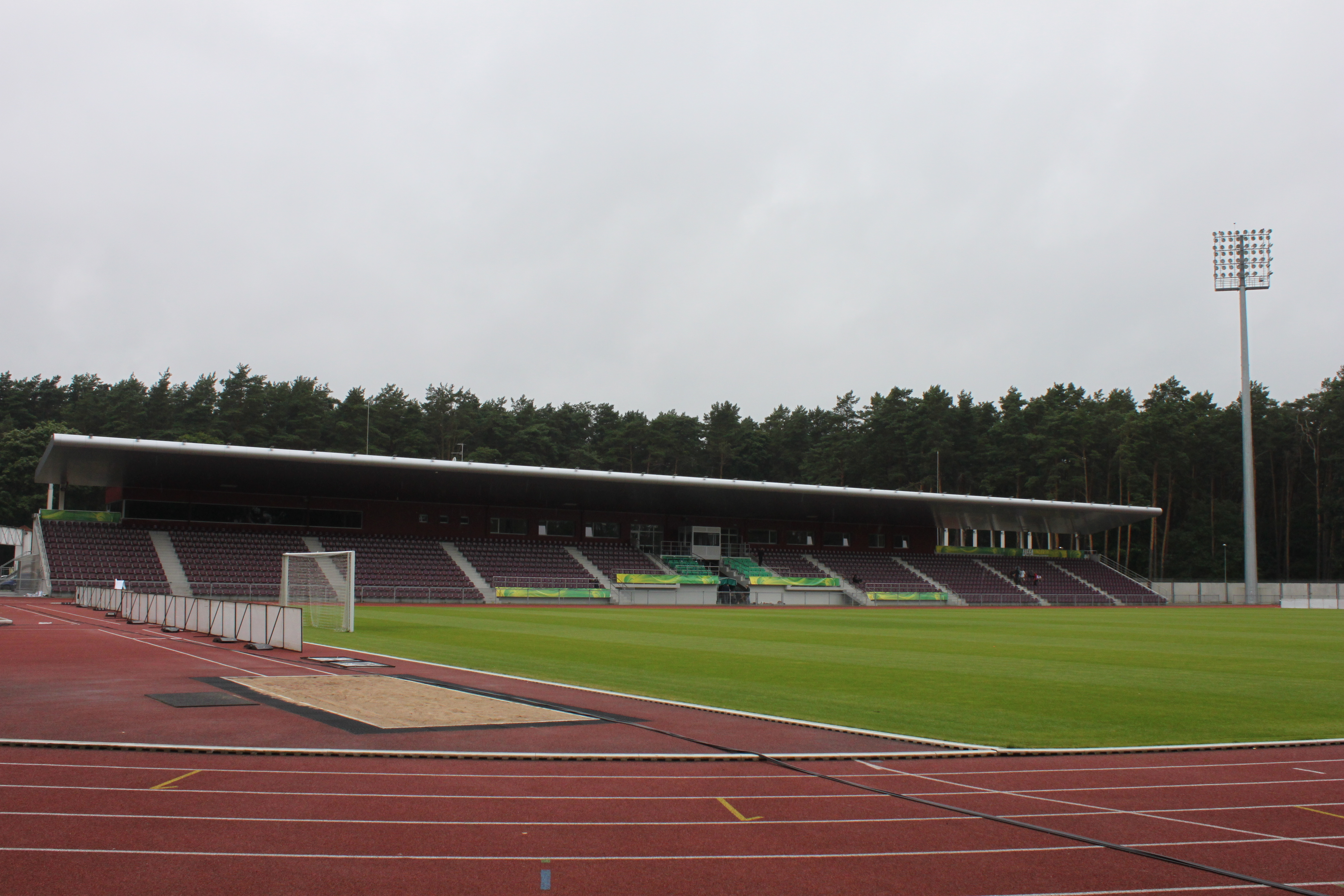

DFK Dainava plays in Alytus Stadium. It is a multi-use stadium in Alytus, Lithuania. The stadium holds 3,790 people. Stadium renovated at 2010.

== Former players ==
- (Italy) Fabio Possagno

== Managers ==
- (Lithuania) Virginijus Sinkevičius
- (Lithuania) Rimvydas Kochanauskas (January 1, 2012 – ?)
- (Lithuania) Darius Urbelionis (May 27, 2013 – December 31, 2013)
- (Belarus) Sergei Aleinikov (March 4, 2014 – May, 2014)
- (San Marino) Marco Ragini (May 20, 2014 – December 31, 2014)
