= 2003 Lithuanian football leagues =

LFF Lyga
- Season: 2003

Final tables of the Lithuanian Championship in 2003 are presented below. The Lithuanian Football Federation (LFF) organized three football leagues: A Lyga (the highest), 1 Lyga (second-tier), and 2 Lyga (third-tier), which comprised four regional zones.

== A Lyga ==
Pos	Team	Pld	W	D	L	GF	GA	GD	Pts	Qualification or relegation
1	FBK Kaunas (C)	28	21	5	2	64	20	+44	68	Qualification to Champions League first qualifying round
2	Ekranas	28	18	8	2	50	19	+31	62	Qualification to UEFA Cup first qualifying round
3	Vėtra	28	13	8	7	42	22	+20	47	Qualification to Intertoto Cup first round
4	Žalgiris	28	9	7	12	37	37	0	34	Qualification to UEFA Cup first qualifying round
5	Atlantas	28	9	6	13	27	30	−3	33	Qualification to Intertoto Cup first round
6	Sūduva	28	8	8	12	39	45	−6	32	
7	Šviesa	28	7	5	16	25	38	−13	26	
8	Sakalas (R)	28	1	5	22	13	86	−73	8	Withdrawn and relegation to lower league (Note: Sakalas was demoted to a lower league. Its place was taken by FK Šilutė.)

(C) Champions; (R) Relegated

== LFF 1 Lyga ==
Pos	Team	Pld	W	D	L	GF	GA	GD	Pts	Qualification (Note: Table errors: 258 total wins != 260 total losses)
1	Polonija Vilnius	34	27	1	6	114	37	+77	82	
2	Geležinis Vilkas Vilnius	34	22	3	9	70	41	+29	69	
3	FK Šilutė	34	21	4	9	72	39	+33	67	
4	Rodovitas Klaipėda	34	20	7	7	75	43	+32	67	
5	Vėtra-2 Rūdiškės	34	19	9	6	68	25	+43	66	
6	Kvintencija Kaunas	34	20	4	10	69	48	+21	64	
7	Kauno Jėgeriai	34	18	5	11	60	39	+21	59	
8	Babrungas Plungė	34	15	8	11	61	52	+9	53	
9	LKAA Atletas Kaunas	34	16	5	13	55	42	+13	53	
10	Ekranas-2 Panevėžys	34	16	5	13	60	48	+12	53	
11	Lietava Jonava	34	13	6	15	49	54	−5	45	
12	Žalgiris-2 Vilnius	34	10	5	19	43	68	−25	35	
13	Nevėžis Kėdainiai	36	11	1	24	47	82	−35	33 (Note: 1 point deducted?)	
14	Kareda Kaunas	34	8	7	19	30	58	−28	31	
15	Utenis Utena	34	7	7	20	42	81	−39	28	
16	Dainava Alytus	34	6	7	21	44	92	−48	25	
17	Banga Gargždai	34	6	7	21	36	90	−54	25	
18	Tauras Tauragė	34	3	5	26	19	75	−56	14	

== LFF 2 Lyga ==
=== Final tournament ===
For the first time a one-round tournament was organized between the winners of each zone.

Pos	Team	Pld	W	D	L	GF	GA	GD	Pts
1	FK Mažeikiai	3	2	0	1	6	8	−2	6
2	Šviesa-2 Vilnius	3	2	0	1	7	3	+4	6
3	Alytis Alytus	3	1	1	1	8	6	+2	4
4	Atlantas-2 Klaipėda	3	0	1	2	2	6	−4	1

=== LFF 2 Lyga zone East ===
Pos	Team	Pld	W	D	L	GF	GA	GD	Pts	Qualification (Note: Table errors: 26 total wins != 27 total losses)
1	Šviesa-2 Vilnius	13	10	0	3	42	20	+22	30	
2	FK Anykščiai	14	8	2	4	30	26	+4	26	
3	Interas-AE Visaginas	14	6	3	5	22	14	+8	21	
4	Širvinta Širvintos	14	2	2	10	22	42	−20	11 (Note: 3 bonus points?)	
5	Vienybė Ukmergė (W)	8	0	3	5	8	22	−14	3	

(W) Withdrew

=== LFF 2 Lyga zone South ===
Pos	Team	Pld	W	D	L	GF	GA	GD	Pts
1	Alytis Alytus	18	13	3	2	47	9	+38	42
2	Nevėžis-2 Kėdainiai	18	11	3	4	46	20	+26	36
3	Neris Karmėlava	18	9	4	5	26	23	+3	31
4	Sūduva-2 Marijampolė	18	10	1	7	42	20	+22	31
5	Šilas Kazlų Rūda	18	8	2	8	35	40	−5	26
6	LKKA Atletas-2 Kaunas	18	7	4	7	30	29	+1	25
7	SC Savingė Kaišiadorys	18	8	1	9	42	25	+17	25
8	Sveikata Kybartai	18	4	8	6	39	44	−5	20
9	Valdima SM Prienai	18	5	2	11	41	52	−11	17
10	Mituva Jurbarkas	18	0	2	16	2	88	−86	2

=== LFF 2 Lyga zone West ===
Pos	Team	Pld	W	D	L	GF	GA	GD	Pts
1	Atlantas-2 Klaipėda	17	13	1	3	60	14	+46	40
2	Kuršiai Neringa	17	11	3	3	41	15	+26	36
3	FK Pagėgiai	17	10	2	5	34	23	+11	32
4	FK Šilutė-2	17	10	0	7	44	31	+13	30
5	Vakarų Dujos Klaipėda	17	7	3	7	24	27	−3	24
6	Minija Kretinga	17	6	2	9	21	25	−4	20
7	Sakuona Plikiai	17	5	2	10	25	54	−29	17
8	Babrungas-2 Plungė	17	5	2	10	24	34	−10	17
9	Salantas Salantai	17	3	1	13	21	57	−36	10
10	Gintaras Palanga (W)	9	2	2	5	17	31	−14	8

(W) Withdrew

=== LFF 2 Lyga zone North ===
Pos	Team	Pld	W	D	L	GF	GA	GD	Pts
1	FK Mažeikiai	16	14	2	0	74	12	+62	44
2	Juventa-99 Šiauliai	16	10	3	3	50	26	+24	33
3	Venta Kuršėnai	16	10	1	5	43	23	+20	31
4	Rinkuškiai Biržai	16	8	2	6	37	30	+7	26
5	Mastis Telšiai	16	7	2	7	38	36	+2	23
6	Kruoja Pakruojis	16	5	1	10	37	59	−22	16
7	Universitetas Šiauliai	16	4	2	10	29	37	−8	14
8	FK Pasvalys	16	3	3	10	31	55	−24	12
9	Kražantė Kelmė	16	3	0	13	14	75	−61	9
