= FK Panerys Vilnius =

- Full name: Sporto klubas „Panerys“
- Founded: 1975
- Dissolved: 1998

FK Panerys Vilnius is a Lithuanian defunct football club from the capital Vilnius, which was founded in 1975. During the 1998–99 season in the A Lyga the club retired after six matches and was dissolved.

== Season-by-season ==
Lithuania

Season	Div.	Pos.	Pl.	W	D	L	Goals	P	Top Scorer	Cup	Europe
1991	1st	8	14	6	2	6	20–13	14			
