= 2005 A Lyga =

A Lyga
- Season: 2005
- Dates: 12 April-12 November
- Champions: FK Ekranas
- UEFA Champions League: FK Ekranas
- UEFA Cup: FK Suduva; FBK Kaunas
- UEFA Intertoto Cup: FK Vetra
- Top goalscorer: (Lithuania) Mantas Savenas (27 goals)

The Lithuanian A Lyga 2005 was the 16th season of top-tier football in Lithuania. The season started on 12 April 2005 and ended on 12 November 2005. 10 teams participated with Ekranas winning the championship.

== League standings ==
Pos	Team	Pld	W	D	L	GF	GA	GD	Pts	Qualification
1	Ekranas (C)	36	29	5	2	87	23	+64	92	Qualification to Champions League first qualifying round
2	FBK Kaunas	36	26	4	6	89	25	+64	82	Qualification to UEFA Cup first qualifying round
3	Sūduva	36	16	11	9	67	43	+24	59	Qualification to UEFA Cup first qualifying round
4	Vėtra	36	17	6	13	45	45	0	57	Qualification to Intertoto Cup first round
5	Vilnius	36	11	14	11	36	29	+7	47	
6	Šilutė	36	12	8	16	44	61	−17	44	
7	Atlantas	36	11	8	17	40	52	−12	41	
8	Žalgiris	36	11	8	17	40	52	−12	41	
9	Šiauliai	36	8	9	19	40	61	−21	33	
10	Nevėžis	36	0	5	31	18	115	−97	5	

Source: www2.omnitel.net
(C) Champions

== Results ==
=== First half of season ===
Home \ Away	ATL	EKR	FBK	NEV	SŪD	ŠIA	ŠIL	VĖT	VIL	ŽAL
Atlantas		0–1	0–2	5–1	1–0	3–1	0–0	1–0	0–1	2–2
Ekranas	0–0		1–0	1–0	2–0	1–0	2–1	8–0	5–1	2–0
FBK Kaunas	2–1	1–2		5–0	3–0	5–1	4–1	0–2	0–0	4–0
Nevėžis	0–0	0–4	0–8		1–5	0–2	0–0	1–2	0–2	0–2
Sūduva	1–0	2–2	0–1	5–0		1–0	4–1	1–1	2–2	1–1
Šiauliai	2–0	2–2	1–0	4–0	1–3		2–1	1–2	0–1	2–3
Šilutė	3–0	1–5	0–4	3–2	1–1	4–1		2–0	1–1	1–0
Vėtra	0–2	0–2	0–1	1–0	1–0	2–1	1–0		2–1	2–0
Vilnius	1–0	0–1	1–0	1–1	0–0	0–0	0–1	0–0		2–0
Žalgiris	1–2	0–4	0–2	4–0	2–4	0–0	2–0	1–0	1–0	

Legend: Blue = home team win; Yellow = draw; Red = away team win.

=== Second half of season ===
Home \ Away	ATL	EKR	FBK	NEV	SŪD	ŠIA	ŠIL	VĖT	VIL	ŽAL
Atlantas		1–3	0–5	2–2	1–3	2–0	2–2	1–3	1–0	1–1
Ekranas	1–2		0–0	4–1	4–1	1–5	3–0	1–0	2–0	4–0
FBK Kaunas	3–1	2–3		3–0	3–1	0–0	5–0	3–0	1–0	3–2
Nevėžis	0–3	0–5	0–2		1–6	1–2	1–3	0–2	0–3	1–2
Sūduva	2–1	1–2	3–4	5–1		0–0	2–1	2–0	1–1	2–0
Šiauliai	1–1	1–3	2–3	2–2	1–4		1–4	1–0	0–2	0–4
Šilutė	1–0	0–2	1–4	3–0	0–0	2–1		3–1	1–1	0–1
Vėtra	3–2	1–1	0–3	6–0	2–2	2–0	3–1		2–0	2–1
Vilnius	4–1	0–1	0–0	3–0	1–1	1–1	5–1	1–1		0–1
Žalgiris	0–1	0–2	2–3	5–2	0–1	1–1	0–0	1–1	0–0	

Legend: Blue = home team win; Yellow = draw; Red = away team win.

== Top goalscorers ==
- Mantas Savėnas (Ekranas) – 27 goals
- Tomas Radzinevičius (Sūduva) – 25 goals
- Povilas Lukšys (Ekranas) – 19 goals

== See also ==
- 2005 LFF Lyga
