= FK Vėtra =

- Full name: Futbolo Klubas Vėtra
- Founded: 1997
- Dissolved: 2010
- Ground: Vėtra Stadium, Vilnius
- Capacity: 5,900
Home colours	Away colours

FK Vėtra was a Lithuanian football team from the capital city of Vilnius.

== History ==
The club was founded in 1997 and was initially based in Rūdiškės, a settlement in Trakai district, and moved in 2003 to Vilnius city with the purchase of its own stadium.

In 2004, Vėtra played in the Intertoto Cup and reached the 3rd round with 3 wins, 2 draws, and 1 loss, including the elimination of Scottish side Hibernian FC.

Their results in the 2005 tournament were not as successful, being eliminated in the early stages by losing both first round matches to future finalists CFR Cluj. In 2006, Vėtra played Shelbourne F.C. of Dublin in the UEFA Intertoto Cup, but lost 0–1 at home, and 0–4 in Ireland.

In the 2007 Intertoto Cup, Vėtra faced Legia Warsaw in the second round, a match that was abandoned due to a riot caused by Legia hooligans while Vėtra was leading 2–0. On 11 July 2007, UEFA issued a ruling awarding Vėtra a 3–0 victory and disqualifying Legia from the competition as a disciplinary measure. In the subsequent third round, Vėtra was eliminated by English club Blackburn Rovers.

In the 2008 edition of the UEFA Cup Vėtra lost to Viking Stavanger despite winning the first leg thanks to a bizarre goal.

In July 2009 Vėtra became the first Lithuanian club to progress in a European knock-out match after losing its first game at home. In the second qualifying round of the UEFA Europa League Vėtra lost 0–1 to HJK Helsinki but defeated their opponents 3–1 to earn a tie against Fulham FC. Vetra lost 3–0 at home and the same away, which means they were knocked out by Fulham.

The team played in the Lithuanian Premier division A Lyga but in summer of 2010 was expelled by Lithuanian Football Federation for financial troubles and debts to players, coaches and other club staff.

== Achievements ==
- A Lyga
  - Runners-up (1): 2009
- LFF Cup
  - Runners-up (4): 2003, 2005, 2008, 2010

== Notable players ==
Players who have either appeared for their respective national team at any time or received an individual award while at the club.

- (Lithuania) Darvydas Šernas
- (Lithuania) Andrius Skerla
- (Lithuania) Mindaugas Panka
- (Lithuania) Artūras Rimkevičius
- (Lithuania) Georgas Freidgeimas
- (Lithuania) Valdemar Borovskij
- (Lithuania) Artūras Žulpa
- (Lithuania) Tomas Mikuckis
- (Estonia) Artjom Dmitrijev
- (Lithuania) Tomas Ražanauskas
- (Lithuania) Donatas Vencevičius
- (Ukraine) Serhiy Kuznetsov
- (Lithuania) Igoris Kirilovas
- (Lithuania) Vidas Alunderis

== Participation in Lithuanian Championships ==
- 2003 – 3rd
- 2004 – 5th
- 2005 – 4th
- 2006 – 3rd
- 2007 – 5th
- 2008 – 3rd
- 2009 – 2nd
- 2010 – expelled from league after the round 17

== Participation in European tournaments ==
Season	Competition	Round	Club	Score
2004	UEFA Intertoto Cup	1st Round	(Estonia) JK Trans Narva	3–0, 1–0
2004	UEFA Intertoto Cup	2nd Round	(Scotland) Hibernian	1–1, 1–0
2004	UEFA Intertoto Cup	3rd Round	(Denmark) Esbjerg fB	1–1, 0–4
2005	UEFA Intertoto Cup	1st Round	(Romania) CFR Cluj	2–3, 1–4
2006	UEFA Intertoto Cup	1st Round	(Republic of Ireland) Shelbourne FC	0–1, 0–4
2007	UEFA Intertoto Cup	1st Round	(Wales) Llanelli AFC	3–1, 3–5
2007	UEFA Intertoto Cup	2nd Round	(Poland) Legia Warsaw	3–0 (awd.)
2007	UEFA Intertoto Cup	3rd Round	(England) Blackburn Rovers	0–2, 0–4
2008–09	UEFA Cup	1st Qualifying Round	(Norway) Viking FK	1–0, 0–2
2009–10	Europa League	1st Qualifying Round	(Luxembourg) CS Grevenmacher	3–0, 3–0
2009–10	Europa League	2nd Qualifying Round	(Finland) HJK Helsinki	0–1, 3–1
2009–10	Europa League	3rd Qualifying Round	(England) Fulham	0–3, 0–3
