= FC Šiauliai =

- Full name: Football Club Šiauliai
- Nickname(s): FK Šiauliai
- Founded: 1995; 30 years ago (as KFK Šiauliai); 2004; 21 years ago (refounded as FK Šiauliai)
- Dissolved: 1 February 2016; 9 years ago
- Ground: Savivaldybė Stadium
- Capacity: 4,000
- Chairman: Saulius Lesnickas (director)
- Coach: Deivis Kančelskis
- League: defunct
- 2015: 9th (dissolved after season)
| Home colours | Away colours |

The former crest of the team

FC Šiauliai is a Lithuanian defunct football club based in the city of Šiauliai. The team is referred to as "Šiauliai".

== History ==
The basketball and football club "Šiauliai" (KFK "Šiauliai") was established in Šiauliai in 1994. The club founded a basketball team in 1994 and a football team in 1995. The football team played in Antra Lyga (3rd tier) and had no desire to move up to a higher division. Rather, the club focused its attention on the basketball championship LKL and other leagues. The situation in Šiauliai City changed when FK Kareda Šiauliai was sold in 1999 and moved from Šiauliai to Kaunas. FK Sakalas Šiauliai was dissolved in 2003, and the KFK Šiauliai football team broke with the basketball team as a result.

=== 2004 ===
In the beginning of 2004, a new organization called VšĮ „Šiaulių futbolo klubas“ was established. Soon after, the FK „Šiauliai“ team was founded. Its leaders sought to build a strong, winning team to rise to A Lyga (top tier).

In 2004 FK Šiauliai was promoted to Pirma Lyga (second tier). That year, they won the 2004 Pirma Lyga. They were then promoted to A Lyga and began playing in the elite division in 2005.

When the team took 2nd place in the championship, they became eligible to play at the European level. The 2010–11 UEFA Europa League defeated 0–7 to Wisła Kraków. The 2012–13 UEFA Europa League lost to FC Levadia Tallinn (2–2 aggr.)

In 2014, FK Šiauliai became FC Šiauliai.

In 2015 the team faced serious financial problems and did not pay their players proper salaries.

The team dissolved in January 2016 due to a lack of sponsorship. The team announced that it would not play in any competition.

== Naming history ==
- 1995 – KFK Šiauliai (basketball and football club);
- 2004 – FK Šiauliai (new club);
- 2014 – FC Šiauliai (renamed)

== Seasons (2004–2016) ==
| Season | Level | League | Position | Link |
|---|---|---|---|---|
| 2004 | 2. | Pirma lyga | 1. | |
| 2005 | 1. | A lyga | 9. | |
| 2006 | 1. | A lyga | 8. | |
| 2007 | 1. | A lyga | 8. | |
| 2008 | 1. | A lyga | 7. | |
| 2009 | 1. | A lyga | 4. | |
| 2010 | 1. | A lyga | 8. | |
| 2011 | 1. | A lyga | 4. | |
| 2012 | 1. | A lyga | 5. | |
| 2013 | 1. | A lyga | 7. | |
| 2014 | 1. | A lyga | 7. | |
| 2015 | 1. | A lyga | 9. | |
| 2016 | x | x | x | |

== Kit evolution ==
- Home: Yellow and black stripes on t-shirt, with black shorts and yellow socks.
- Away: The same striped t-shirt with yellow socks and shorts.

| 2004–2015 (Home) | 2004–2015 (Away) |

== Stadium ==
Savivaldybė Stadium, located at S. Daukanto g. 23, Šiauliai, is a multi-use stadium. It is used primarily for football matches and is the home stadium of FK Šiauliai. The stadium holds 4,000 people.

== Honours ==
- Lithuanian Cup:
  - Runners-up (1): 2013

== Participation in Europe cups ==
| Season | Cup | Round | Country | Club | Score |
|---|---|---|---|---|---|
| 2010–11 | Europa League | 2Q | (Poland) | Wisła Kraków | 0–2, 0–5 |
| 2012–13 | Europa League | 1Q | (Estonia) | FC Levadia Tallinn | 0–1, 2–1 |

== Managers ==
- (Lithuania) Vytautas Jančiauskas (2004–05)
- (Lithuania) Saulius Vertelis (2006)
- (Lithuania) Darius Magdišauskas (2006)
- (Lithuania) Rytis Tavoras (2008)
- (Italy) Fabio Lopez (2008)
- (Lithuania) Deivis Kančelskis (2009)
- (Lithuania) Valdas Ivanauskas (2010)
- (Lithuania) Saulius Širmelis (Jan 2011–11)
- (Lithuania) Deivis Kančelskis (2011–2013)
- (Lithuania) Gediminas Jarmalavičius (2014–2015)
- (Lithuania) Tomas Ražanauskas (Jan 2015 – July 2015)
- (Lithuania) Deivis Kančelskis (July 2015 – January 2016)
