= FK Šilutė =

Lithuanian football club

Šilutė
- Full name: Futbolo Klubas Šilutė
- Founded: 1991
- Ground: Šilutė Stadium
- Capacity: 7500
- Chairman: Romualdas Taršauskas
- Manager: Bronius Mackevičius
- League: II Lyga
- 2023: II Lyga, 5th
Home colours	Away colours

Futbolo Klubas Šilutė (before 2003, Laisvė Šilutė) is a Lithuanian football team from the city of Šilutė. The team plays in the II Lyga, the third tier of Lithuanian football. A notable former player of the club is Adebayo Akinfenwa.

== Participation in Lithuanian Championships ==
- 2003 – 3rd (I Lyga)
- 2004 – 6th
- 2005 – 6th
- 2006 – 9th
- 2007 – 9th
- 2008 – 8th
- 2009 – 1st (I Lyga)
- 2010 – 8th (I Lyga)
- 2011 – 8th (I Lyga)
- 2011 – 7th (I Lyga)

== Current squad ==
As of 17 April 2016

Note: Flags indicate national team as defined under FIFA eligibility rules; some limited exceptions apply. Players may hold more than one non-FIFA nationality.

No.	Pos.	Nation	Player
1	GK	LTU	Liudvikas Valius
2	DF	LTU	Aldas Žernys
3	MF	LTU	Arnoldas Nausėdas
4	DF	LTU	Arvydas Miklovis
5	DF	LTU	Žilvinas Česnulis
6	MF	LTU	Giedrius Kurpeikis
7	FW	LTU	Dovijus Česnulis
8	MF	LTU	Andrius Gedgaudas
11	DF	LTU	Paulius Juška

No.	Pos.	Nation	Player
12	DF	LTU	Tadas Kazlauskas
13	FW	LTU	Darius Paldauskas
14	DF	LTU	Edgaras Lukoševičius
15	MF	LTU	Gediminas Strikys
20	MF	LTU	Justas Milius
21	MF	LTU	Martynas Golubovskis
22	MF	LTU	Lukas Konaverskis
24	MF	LTU	Donatas Surblys
33	GK	LTU	Algirdas Surgautas

== Managers history ==
In 2019, Bronius Mackevičius was confirmed as the new head coach of the club.

Nationality	Head coach	from	until	Notes
(Lithuania)	Svajūnas Česnulis	2002	Dec 2017	
(Lithuania)	Marijus Jazbutis	Feb 2018	Dec 2018	
(Lithuania)	Bronius Mackevičius	Apr 2019	May 2020	
(Lithuania)	Svajūnas Česnulis	May 2020	Present	
