= FBK Kaunas =

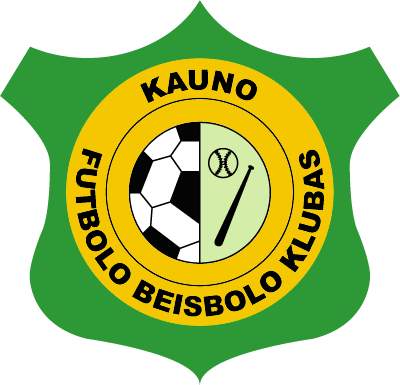
- Full name: Kauno futbolo ir beisbolo klubas
- Nickname: Geltonai-Žali (Yellow-Greens)
- Founded: 1960 as FK Banga; 1993 as FBK Kaunas
- Dissolved: 2012
- Ground: S. Darius and S. Girėnas Stadium
- Capacity: 9,180
Home colours	Away colours

Kauno futbolo ir beisbolo klubas, commonly known as FBK Kaunas, was a professional football club based in Kaunas, Lithuania.

== History ==
=== Banga Kaunas (1960–1993) ===
Banga Kaunas
- Full name: Banga Kaunas
- Founded: 1960
- Dissolved: 1993
- Stadium: Kaunas Polytechnic Stadium
Home colours	Away colours

The roots of the club can be traced back to 1960 when Banga Kaunas was founded. Capable players were invited to the club and the club immediately received the right to play in the USSR competitions, which it transferred to Granitas Klaipėda after 1962. In 1963, the club was to be disbanded, but remained as a amateur club of the Kaunas Radio Factory. In 1963, the physical education club of the Kaunas Radio Factory was given the name of a sports club (for good sports performance).

Afterwards, the club played in the Lithuanian SSR championship and they did so until 1990. Later, Banga Kaunas was one of the strongest football clubs, in the 1986 LFF Lyga, they became Lithuanian champions. In the 1989 LFF Lyga, they repeated this achievement, and after regaining independence, Banga Kaunas was merged with FK Vilija Kaunas in the summer of 1991. They played as Banga Kaunas until 1993 before the club changed its name.

=== FBK Kaunas (1993–1999 and 2000–2012) ===
In 1993, the club was renamed to Kauno futbolo beisbolo klubas. The club had in its first years not such a great success and FBK Kaunas had to wait until 1999 before they could lift a trophy again. Club was shortly renamed to Žalgiris Kaunas after the ninth round of 1999 A Lyga, but only carried the name for the remaining of the season. From 1999 to 2008, Kaunas won eight championships, four Lithuanian Cups, three Super Cups and one Baltic league title. After finishing second in 2008 A Lyga, the club's president announced that the club was being demoted from A Lyga to I Lyga, the second tier of Lithuanian football system, but as conflict with the Lithuanian Football Federation (LFF) intensified, FBK Kaunas was relegated to II Lyga that consisted of amateur teams.

FBK Kaunas won II Lyga championship in their first year in that division. Despite relegation FBK Kaunas also participated in the new UEFA Europa League as a vice champions of 2008 A Lyga, but did not advance past FK Sevojno. Despite drawing both games FBK Kaunas lost on away goals. FBK Kaunas won I Lyga in 2010 and was promoted to the 2011 A Lyga. The 2011 season was a huge disappointment for Kaunas as they did not manage to live up to the high expectations and eventually ended at 10th place.

FBK Kaunas were not granted a 2012 A Lyga license because of financial problems and was due to play in the 2012 I Lyga. However, due to the club's increasing financial problems the chairman eventually decided to withdraw the club from any competitions and later declared the club bankrupt. Shortly afterwards the fans decided to form a new club.

Kaunas have played Celtic, Rangers and Liverpool among others in Champions League and Europa League qualifying stages. On 5 August 2008, FBK Kaunas defeated Rangers, 2–1, to advance to the third qualifying round of the UEFA Champions League for the first time. The game was won in dramatic circumstances as Kaunas had to come from behind and finally took the lead just four minutes from time. Linas Pilibaitis was the scorer.

FBK Kaunas were for many years (1993–2012) sponsored by Ūkio bankas, a bank which had Vladimir Romanov as its principal shareholder. In October 2005, Romanov became the majority shareholder of Scottish Premier League side, Heart of Midlothian. Romanov then used Kaunas as a feeder club for Hearts by signing players ostensibly for Kaunas, then immediately loaning them to the SPL side. Romanov's mismanagement and dubious dealings effectively destroyed the clubs he was involved with FBK Kaunas and Partizan Minsk going bankrupt and Hearts into administration. Romanov fled to Russia where he was granted asylum in 2014 and is now wanted by the Lithuanian prosecutors on charges for fraud and embezzling for at least £308 million.

== Honours ==
=== Domestic ===
- A Lyga
  - Winners (8): 1999, 2000, 2001, 2002, 2003, 2004, 2006, 2007
  - Runners-up (2): 2005, 2008
- I Lyga
  - Winners (1): 2010
- II Lyga
  - Winners (1): 2009
- Lithuanian Cup
  - Winners (4): 2002, 2004, 2005, 2008
  - Runners-up (2): 1998, 1999
- Lithuanian Super Cup
  - Winners (3): 2002, 2004, 2006,
  - Runners-up (2): 2003, 2005
- Lithuanian SSR Championship
  - Winners (2): 1986, 1989
- Lithuanian SSR Cup
  - Winners (1):1989
  - Runners-up (3): 1984, 1985, 1986

=== Continental ===
- Baltic League
  - Winners (1): 2008
- Commonwealth of Independent States Cup
  - Runners-up (1): 2006

== Season-by-season ==
=== Domestic ===
Season	Div.	Pos.	Pl.	W	D	L	Goals	Pts	Top Scorer	Cup	Supercup	Baltic League	Europe		Notes
1991	1st	3	14	9	4	1	24–10	22			Not contested	Baltic; League not founded until 2007			
1991–92	1st	4	25	11	10	4	26–15	32			Not contested	Baltic; League not founded until 2007			
1992–93	1st	5	27	11	5	11	36–29	27			Not contested	Baltic; League not founded until 2007			
1993–94	1st	5	22	12	4	6	31–18	28			Not contested	Baltic; League not founded until 2007			
1994–95	1st	6	22	8	8	6	25–22	24		1/4	dnq	Baltic; League not founded until 2007			
1995–96	1st	4	28	14	3	11	33–15	31		1/4	Not contested	Baltic; League not founded until 2007			
1996–97	1st	4	28	15	5	11	48–35	41		1/2	dnq	Baltic; League not founded until 2007	IC	Group stage	
1997–98	1st	5	30	18	4	8	63–19	58	(Lithuania) Trakys	Final	Not contested	Baltic; League not founded until 2007	IC	Group stage	
1998–99	1st	3	23	18	3	2	57–14	57	(Lithuania) Trakys	Final	Not contested	Baltic; League not founded until 2007			
1999	1st	1	18	12	5	1	36–10	41	(Lithuania) Kšanavičius	1/4	Not contested	Baltic; League not founded until 2007	UC	1st Qualifying round	
2000	1st	1	36	26	8	2	115–24	86	(Lithuania) Velička	1/2	Not contested	Baltic; League not founded until 2007	CL	2nd qualifying round	
2001	1st	1	36	26	7	3	76–13	85	(Lithuania) Pocius	Winner	Not contested	Baltic; League not founded until 2007	CL	1st qualifying round	
2002	1st	1	32	24	6	2	85–20	78	(Lithuania) Šlekys	1/4	Winner	Baltic; League not founded until 2007	CL	1st qualifying round	
2003	1st	1	28	21	5	2	64–20	68	(Czech Republic) Opic	1/2	Runner up	Baltic; League not founded until 2007	CL	2nd qualifying round	
2004	1st	1	28	20	5	3	49–19	65	(Lithuania) Velička	Winner	Winner	Baltic; League not founded until 2007	CL	2nd qualifying round	
2005	1st	2	36	26	4	6	89–25	82	(Lithuania) Beniušis	Winner	Runner up	Baltic; League not founded until 2007	CL	2nd qualifying round	
2006	1st	1	36	28	4	4	85–30	88	(Lithuania) Velička / (Lithuania) Beniušis	1/4	Winner	Baltic; League not founded until 2007	UC	2nd qualifying round	
2007	1st	1	36	25	8	3	91–26	83	(Lithuania) Grigalevičius	Not contested	Not contested	1/2	CL	1st qualifying round	
2008	1st	2	28	16	7	5	51–17	55	(Brazil) Ledesma	Winner	Not contested	Winner	CL / UC	3rd qualifying round / 1st round	Relegated to II Lyga
2009	3rd	1	20	19	0	1	110–10	57	(Lithuania) Macežinskas	1/2	dnq	dnq	EL	2nd qualifying round	Promoted to I Lyga
2010	2nd	1	27	27	0	0	108–16	81	(Bosnia and Herzegovina) Pehlić	1/2	dnq	dnq			Promoted to A Lyga
2011	1st	10	33	8	8	17	41–53	26	(Lithuania) Razulis	1/2	dnq	dnq			Did not get a licence for the 2012 season

=== European cup ===
Season	Competition	Round	Club	Home	Away	Aggregate	Scored
1996–97	Intertoto Cup	Group stage	(Norway) Lillestrøm SK	1–4	—	4th	(Lithuania) Kirilovas
1996–97	Intertoto Cup	Group stage	(France) FC Nantes	—	1–3	4th	(Lithuania) Žalys
1996–97	Intertoto Cup	Group stage	(Republic of Ireland) Sligo Rovers	1–0	—	4th	(Lithuania) Miknevičius
1996–97	Intertoto Cup	Group stage	(Netherlands) Heerenveen	—	1–3	4th	(Lithuania) Gvildys
1997–98	Intertoto Cup	Group stage	(Turkey) Samsunspor	0–1	—	3rd	
1997–98	Intertoto Cup	Group stage	(Iceland) Leiftur	—	3–2	3rd	(Lithuania) Buitkus (Lithuania) Trakys (Lithuania) Bezykornovas
1997–98	Intertoto Cup	Group stage	(Germany) Hamburger SV	1–2	—	3rd	(Lithuania) Bezykornovas
1997–98	Intertoto Cup	Group stage	(Denmark) Odense	—	2–2	3rd	(Lithuania) Bezykornovas (Lithuania) Trakys
1999–00	UEFA Cup	Qual. round	(Israel) Maccabi Tel Aviv	2–1	1–3	3–4	(Lithuania) Pacevičius-2 (Lithuania) Papečkys
2000–01	UEFA Champions League	1st QR	(Bosnia and Herzegovina) NK Brotnjo	4–0	0–3	4–3	(Lithuania) Kšanavičius-2 (Lithuania) Žuta (Lithuania) Puotkalis
2000–01	UEFA Champions League	2nd QR	(Scotland) Rangers FC	0–0	1–4	1–4	(Lithuania) Žuta
2001–02	UEFA Champions League	1st QR	(North Macedonia) Sloga Jugomagnat	1–1	0–0	1–1	(Lithuania) Papečkys
2002–03	UEFA Champions League	1st QR	(Albania) Dinamo Tirana	2–3	0–0	2–3	(Lithuania) Velička-2
2003–04	UEFA Champions League	1st QR	(Faroe Islands) Havnar Bóltfelag	4–1	1–0	5–1	(Lithuania) Beniušis-2, (Lithuania) Kančelskis, (Czech Republic) Opic
2003–04	UEFA Champions League	2nd QR	(Scotland) Celtic	0–4	0–1	0–5	
2004–05	UEFA Champions League	1st QR	(Malta) Sliema Wanderers	4–1	2–0	6–1	(Lithuania) Sanajevas-2, (Lithuania) Žutautas, (Lithuania) Gedgaudas, (Lithuania) Mikoliūnas, (Lithuania) Žaliūkas
2004–05	UEFA Champions League	2nd QR	(Sweden) Djurgården	0–2	0–0	0–2	
2005–06	UEFA Champions League	1st QR	(Faroe Islands) Havnar Bóltfelag	4–0	4–2	8–2	(Lithuania) Velička-3, (Lithuania) Zelmikas-2, (Lithuania) Rimkevičius-2, (Poland) Klimek
2005–06	UEFA Champions League	2nd QR	(England) Liverpool	1–3	0–2	1–5	(Lithuania) Barevičius
2006–07	UEFA Cup	1st QR	(Northern Ireland) Portadown	1–0	3–1	4–1	(Georgia (country)) Manchkava, (Bosnia and Herzegovina) Pehlić, (Lithuania) Velička, (Lithuania) Ivaškevičius
2006–07	UEFA Cup	2nd QR	(Denmark) Randers	1–0	1–3	2–3	(Lithuania) Juška, (Lithuania) Velička
2007–08	UEFA Champions League	1st QR	(Montenegro) Zeta	3–2	1–3	4–5	(Georgia (country)) Kvaratskhelia-2, (Lithuania) Beniušis, (Lithuania) Kšanavičius
2008–09	UEFA Champions League	1st QR	(Andorra) Santa Coloma	3–1	4–1	7–2	(Lithuania) Pilibaitis-4, (Brazil) Ledesma-2, (Lithuania) Zelmikas
2008–09	UEFA Champions League	2nd QR	(Scotland) Rangers FC	2–1	0–0	2–1	(Lithuania) Radžius, (Lithuania) Pilibaitis
2008–09	UEFA Champions League	3rd QR	(Denmark) Aalborg	0–2	0–2	0–4	
2008–09	UEFA Cup	1st round	(Italy) Sampdoria	1–2	0–5	1–7	(Lithuania) Zelmikas
2009–10	UEFA Europa League	2nd QR	(Serbia) Sevojno	1–1	0–0	1–1	(Lithuania) Fridrikas

== Coaches ==
- (Lithuania) Povilas Grigonis (1986)
- (Lithuania) Algirdas Gruzdas (1989)
- (Lithuania) Šenderis Giršovičius (1995–96), (1998–00)
- (Belarus) Sergei Borovsky (July 2003 – April 4)
- (Lithuania) Šenderis Giršovičius (April 2004 – Sept 04)
- (Lithuania) Valdas Ivanauskas (Sept 2004 – April 5)
- (Lithuania) Eugenijus Riabovas (April 2005 – May 5)
- (Russia) Aleksandr Piskaryov (May 2005 – July 5)
- (Lithuania) Igoris Pankratjevas (July 2005 – Nov 05)
- (Belarus) Eduard Malofeyev (Dec 2005 – June 6)
- (Lithuania) Eugenijus Riabovas (June 2006 – Feb 07)
- (Belarus) Vladimir Kurnev (Feb 2007 – April 7)
- (Bulgaria) Angel Chervenkov (April 2007 – June 7)
- (Lithuania) Artūras Ramoška (June 2007 – Sept 07)
- (Netherlands) Anton Joore (Aug 2007 – Sept 07)
- (Belarus) Andrei Zygmantovich (Sept 2007 – July 8)
- (Portugal) Jose Couceiro (July 2008 – Oct 08)
- (Belarus) Andrei Zygmantovich (Nov 2008 – Dec 08)
- (Lithuania) Eugenijus Riabovas (Dec 2008 – April 9)
- (Lithuania) Saulius Vertelis (April 2009 – Sept 10)
- (Lithuania) Darius Gvildys (Sept 2010 – March 11)
- (Lithuania) Eugenijus Riabovas (March 2011 – Feb 12)
