= FK Kareda Kaunas =

FK Kareda
- Founded: 1995; 31 years ago
- Dissolved: 2003; 23 years ago
- Ground: Kariuomenės Stadium, Kaunas
- Capacity: 1,000
Home colours	Away colours

FK Kareda is a defunct Lithuanian football team from the city of Šiauliai, which re-located to Kaunas in 2000 and was dissolved in 2003.

== History ==
=== 1990–1995 ===
In 1990, the club was founded as "Sakalas Šiauliai". They competed in the 1990 Baltic league, and after 1991, competed in the top division of Lithuania (Aukščiausia lyga, "Toplyga").

They competed for five seasons in the Toplyga without earning any titles. In 1995, the club found new investors and sponsorship.

=== 1995–1999 ===
After the club was sold, it underwent re-branding, and its name was changed to "Kareda–Sakalas". The club's new sponsors were linked to the criminal group "Princai" from Šiauliai City; when Lithuanian police and power structures cracked down on these criminal elements in 1999, the football club lost sponsorship and had to be sold.

From 1996 onward, the club was known as FK Kareda. In the 1995–96 and 1998–99 seasons, FK Kareda had strong players who won the Lithuanian Football Cup championship.

=== 2000 ===
Before the 2000 season, the club was sold and moved to Kaunas. The new owner was Vladimir Romanov, who also owned FBK Kaunas; since two clubs with the same owner could not play in the same league, Kareda was relegated to the second level. In 2003, the owner decided to disband the team and liquidate the club.

=== Name changes ===
- 1990 – Sakalas Šiauliai
- 1995 – Kareda-Sakalas Šiauliai
- 1996 – Kareda Šiauliai

== Participation in Lithuanian Championships ==
- 2003 – 14th
- 2002 – 10th
- 2001 – 9th (FK Kareda was no longer eligible to play, since it had become a farm club of FBK Kaunas)
- 2000 – 5th
- 1999 – 4th
- 1998–99 – 2nd
- 1997–98 – Champions
- 1996–97 – Champions

== Achievements ==
- A Lyga: 2 championship wins (1997, 1998)
- Lithuanian Cup: 3 championship wins (1974, 1996, 1999)
- Lithuanian SSR Championship: 2 championship wins (1969, 1977)

== Season by season (since 1991) ==
Season	Level	League	Position	@	Notes
1991	1.	Lietuvos lyga	9.		
1991/1992	1.	Lietuvos lyga	8.		
1992/1993	1.	Lietuvos lyga	10.		
1993/1994	1.	Lietuvos lyga	9.		
1994/1995	1.	I lyga	7.		
1995/1996	1.	I lyga	2.		🏆 LFF Cup
1996/1997	1.	I lyga	1.		Champions
1997/1998	1.	Lietuvos lyga	1.		Champions
1998/1999	1.	I lyga	2.		🏆 LFF Cup
1999/2000	1.	LFF lyga	4.		

== Head coaches ==
- Algimantas Liubinskas, 1996–1997
- Šenderis Giršovičius, 1997–1998, 1999
- Aleksandr Piskarev, 1999
- Valdemaras Martinkėnas, 1999 autumn

== Famous players ==
- Igoris Pankratjevas, 1994
- Remigijus Pocius, 1992, 1995
- Igoris Kirilovas, 1995
- Vidas Dančenka, 1997
- Artūras Fomenka, 1996, 1999
- Tadas Gražiūnas, 1998
- Tomas Kančelskis, 1995, 1997, 1999
- Darius Maciulevičius, 1999
- Saulius Mikalajūnas, 1996–1997
- Irmantas Stumbrys, 1995–1996
- Tomas Žiukas, 1995–1997
- Audrius Žuta, 1996–1998
- Rimantas Žvingilas, 1995–1996
