= 1990 in Soviet football =

Football in the Soviet Union
- Season: 1990

Men's football
- Top League: Dinamo Kiev
- First League: Spartak Vladikavkaz
- Second League: Bukovina Chernovtsy (West); Uralmash Sverdlovsk (Center); Neftianik Fergana (East); Zhalgiris Vilnius (Baltic)
- Lower Second League: Torpedo Zaporozhye (Group 1); Ararat-2 Yerevan (Group 2); Karabakh Agdam (Group 3); Torpedo Taganrog (Group 4); Asmaral Moscow (Group 5); Volga Tver (Group 6); KAMAZ Naberezhnye Chelny (Group 7); Vostok Ust-Kamenogorsk (Group 8); Nurafshon Bukhara (Group 9); Sakhalin Yuzhno-Sakhalinsk (Group 10)
- Soviet Cup: Dinamo Kiev

The 1990 Soviet football championship was the 59th season of competitive football in the Soviet Union. Dinamo Kiev won the Top League championship becoming the Soviet domestic champions for the thirteenth time.

== Honours ==
Competition		Winner	Runner-up
Top League		Dinamo Kiev (13*)	CSKA Moscow
First League		Spartak Vladikavkaz (1)	Pakhtakor Tashkent
Second League	West	Bukovina Chernovtsy	Daugava Riga
Second League	Center	Uralmash Sverdlovsk	Tekstilschik Kamyshin
Second League	East	Neftianik Fergana	Novbakhor Namangan
Second League	Baltic	Zhaligiris Vilnius	Siriyus Klaipeda
Lower Second League	Group 1	Torpedo Zaporozhye	Sudostroitel Nikolayev
Lower Second League	Group 2	Ararat-2 Yerevan	Araks Oktemberian
Lower Second League	Group 3	Karabakh Agdam	Khazar Sumgayit
Lower Second League	Group 4	Torpedo Taganrog	APK Azov
Lower Second League	Group 5	Asmaral Moscow	Tigina Bendery
Lower Second League	Group 6	Volga Tver	KIM Vitebsk
Lower Second League	Group 7	KAMAZ Naberezhnye Chelny	Lada Tolyatti
Lower Second League	Group 8	Vostok Ust-Kamenogorsk	Zhetysu Taldy-Kurgan
Lower Second League	Group 9	Nurafshon Bukhara	Kasansayets Kasansay
Lower Second League	Group 10	Sakhalin Yuzhno-Sakhalinsk	Lokomotiv Chita
Soviet Cup		Dinamo Kiev (9)	Lokomotiv Moscow

Notes = Number in parentheses is the times that club has won that honour. * indicates new record for competition

== Soviet Union football championship ==
=== Top League ===
Pos	Team	Pld	W	D	L	GF	GA	GD	Pts	Qualification (Note: Guria and Dinamo Tbilisi never played any games in the league for the season and joined their national competition. Žalgiris joined the 1990 Baltic League which was a regional international competition.)
1	(Ukrainian Soviet Socialist Republic) Dynamo Kyiv (C)	24	14	6	4	44	20	+24	34	Qualification for European Cup first round
2	(Russian Soviet Federative Socialist Republic) CSKA Moscow	24	13	5	6	43	26	+17	31	Qualification for Cup Winners' Cup first round
3	(Russian Soviet Federative Socialist Republic) Dinamo Moscow	24	12	7	5	27	24	+3	31	Qualification for UEFA Cup first round
4	(Russian Soviet Federative Socialist Republic) Torpedo Moscow	24	13	4	7	28	24	+4	30	Qualification for UEFA Cup first round
5	(Russian Soviet Federative Socialist Republic) Spartak Moscow	24	12	5	7	39	26	+13	29	Qualification for UEFA Cup first round
6	(Ukrainian Soviet Socialist Republic) Dnipro Dnipropetrovsk	24	11	6	7	39	26	+13	28	
7	(Armenian Soviet Socialist Republic) Ararat Yerevan	24	8	7	9	25	23	+2	23	
8	(Ukrainian Soviet Socialist Republic) Shakhtar Donetsk	24	6	10	8	23	31	−8	22	
9	(Ukrainian Soviet Socialist Republic) Chornomorets Odesa	24	8	3	13	23	29	−6	19	
10	(Tajik Soviet Socialist Republic) Pamir Dushanbe	24	7	4	13	26	34	−8	18	
11	(Ukrainian Soviet Socialist Republic) Metalist Kharkiv	24	5	8	11	13	28	−15	18	
12	(Byelorussian Soviet Socialist Republic) Dinamo Minsk	24	6	3	15	20	34	−14	15	
13	(Russian Soviet Federative Socialist Republic) Rotor Volgograd (R)	24	4	6	14	14	39	−25	14	Qualification for Relegation play-off
14	(Lithuanian Soviet Socialist Republic) Žalgiris Vilnius (Note: Žalgiris Vilnius withdrew from the championship after losing to Chornomorets 1–0 in Odesa. Žalgiris' record was 0 wins, 0 draws and 1 loss with 0-1 goal difference and later was annulled. As Žalgiris withdrew, its European berth was transferred to Chornomorets.) (R)	0	0	0	~~1~~	0	0	0	0	Withdrew from the league

(C) Champions; (R) Relegated

=== Promotion/relegation play-off ===
(13th team of the Top League and 4th team of the First League)

Team 1	Agg.	Team 2	1st leg	2nd leg
Lokomotiv Moscow	3–2	Rotor Volgograd	3–1	0–1

1990-11-11

Lokomotiv Moscow	3 – 1	Rotor Volgograd
Samatov 12'; Rybakov 51'; Zhitkov 79'	Report	Fyodorovsky 76'

LFK CSKA, Moscow
Attendance: 2,000 (4,600)
Referee: Petro Kobychek (Chernivtsi)

1990-11-17

Rotor Volgograd	1 – 0	Lokomotiv Moscow
Polstyanov 1'	Report	Gallakberov (yellow card) ?' (yellow-red card) 89'

Central Stadium of Trade Unions, Volgograd
Attendance: 25,000
Referee: Vadim Zhuk (Minsk)

Lokomotiv Moscow won the promotion on 3–2 aggregate

=== First League ===
Pos	Team	Pld	W	D	L	GF	GA	GD	Pts	Promotion or relegation
1	(Russian Soviet Federative Socialist Republic) Spartak Vladikavkaz (C, P)	38	24	9	5	73	30	+43	57	Promotion to Top League
2	(Uzbek Soviet Socialist Republic) Pakhtakor Tashkent (P)	38	23	8	7	80	45	+35	54	Promotion to Top League
3	(Ukrainian Soviet Socialist Republic) Metalurh Zaporizhia (P)	38	19	14	5	58	30	+28	52	Promotion to Top League
4	(Russian Soviet Federative Socialist Republic) Lokomotiv Moscow (P)	38	19	9	10	52	34	+18	47	Qualification for Promotion play-off
5	(Russian Soviet Federative Socialist Republic) Dynamo Stavropol	38	20	6	12	56	42	+14	46	
6	(Russian Soviet Federative Socialist Republic) Shinnik Yaroslavl	38	19	8	11	55	39	+16	46	
7	(Moldavian Soviet Socialist Republic) Nistru Chisinau	38	14	12	12	50	44	+6	40	
8	(Azerbaijan Soviet Socialist Republic) Neftchi Baku	38	14	10	14	52	51	+1	38	
9	(Ukrainian Soviet Socialist Republic) Tavriya Simferopol	38	11	16	11	40	38	+2	38	
10	(Russian Soviet Federative Socialist Republic) Fakel Voronezh	38	14	9	15	43	45	−2	37	
11	(Russian Soviet Federative Socialist Republic) Geolog Tyumen	38	14	9	15	38	45	−7	37	
12	(Georgian Soviet Socialist Republic) Dinamo Sukhumi	38	14	8	16	36	41	−5	36	
13	(Moldavian Soviet Socialist Republic) Tiras Tiraspol	38	10	15	13	32	45	−13	35	
14	(Armenian Soviet Socialist Republic) Kotayk Abovyan	38	12	9	17	44	52	−8	33	
15	(Russian Soviet Federative Socialist Republic) Rostselmash Rostov-on-Don	38	11	9	18	39	56	−17	31	
16	(Russian Soviet Federative Socialist Republic) Lokomotiv Nizhniy Novgorod	38	10	11	17	39	58	−19	31	
17	(Kazakh Soviet Socialist Republic) Kairat Almaty	38	10	10	18	35	50	−15	30	
18	(Russian Soviet Federative Socialist Republic) Zenit Leningrad	38	8	14	16	35	41	−6	30	
19	(Russian Soviet Federative Socialist Republic) Kuban Krasnodar	38	11	6	21	34	60	−26	28	
20	(Russian Soviet Federative Socialist Republic) Kuzbass Kemerevo (R)	38	4	6	28	21	66	−45	14	Relegation to Second League

(C) Champions; (P) Promoted; (R) Relegated

Notes:

- The city of Ordzhonikidze was renamed to Vladikavkaz.
- The city of Gorkiy was renamed to Nizhniy Novgorod.
- Kotayk Abovyan played all its home games in the neighboring Yerevan.

=== West ===
Pos	Rep	Team	Pld	W	D	L	GF	GA	GD	Pts	Promotion or relegation
1	(Ukrainian Soviet Socialist Republic)	Bukovina Chernovtsy	50	29	17	4	87	34	+53	75	Promoted to First Liga
2	(Latvia)	Daugava Riga	50	31	9	10	86	43	+43	71	Promoted to First Liga
3	(Ukrainian Soviet Socialist Republic)	Karpaty Lvov	50	28	13	9	86	45	+41	69	
4	(Ukrainian Soviet Socialist Republic)	Niva Ternopol	50	28	13	9	67	38	+29	69	
5	(Ukrainian Soviet Socialist Republic)	Niva Vinnitsa	50	24	14	12	67	42	+25	62	
6	(Ukrainian Soviet Socialist Republic)	SKA Odessa	50	23	15	12	82	60	+22	61	
7	(Ukrainian Soviet Socialist Republic)	Zarya Lugansk	50	25	9	16	69	50	+19	59	
8	(Russian Soviet Federative Socialist Republic)	Spartak Nalchik	50	20	14	16	51	40	+11	54	
9	(Byelorussian Soviet Socialist Republic)	Dinamo Brest	50	19	15	16	64	53	+11	53	
10	(Ukrainian Soviet Socialist Republic)	Kremin Kremenchug	50	22	7	21	64	66	−2	51	
11	(Moldavian Soviet Socialist Republic)	Zaria Balti	50	19	13	18	75	64	+11	51	
12	(Ukrainian Soviet Socialist Republic)	Vorskla Poltava	50	19	12	19	84	66	+18	50	
13	(Byelorussian Soviet Socialist Republic)	Dnepr Mogilev	50	20	9	21	59	59	0	49	
14	(Ukrainian Soviet Socialist Republic)	Galichina Drogobich	50	18	13	19	54	55	−1	49	
15	(Byelorussian Soviet Socialist Republic)	Khimik Grodno	50	20	8	22	59	64	−5	48	
16	(Russian Soviet Federative Socialist Republic)	Start Ulyanovsk	50	15	15	20	48	55	−7	45	
17	(Ukrainian Soviet Socialist Republic)	Volyn Lutsk	50	15	15	20	58	73	−15	45	
18	(Armenian Soviet Socialist Republic)	Lori Kirovokan	50	17	10	23	47	59	−12	44	
19	(Russian Soviet Federative Socialist Republic)	Iskra Smolensk	50	15	13	22	52	70	−18	43	Relegated
20	(Ukrainian Soviet Socialist Republic)	Zakarpatie Uzhgorod	50	17	8	25	56	75	−19	42	Relegated
21	(Russian Soviet Federative Socialist Republic)	Baltika Kaliningrad	50	11	20	19	48	60	−12	42	Relegated
22	(Armenian Soviet Socialist Republic)	Shirak Leninakan	50	13	15	22	58	77	−19	41	Relegated

Representation

- Ukrainian SSR: 11
- Russian SFSR 4
- Byelorussian SSR: 3
- Armenian SSR 2
- Latvian SSR: 1
- Moldavian SSR 1

=== Center ===
Pos	Rep	Team	Pld	W	D	L	GF	GA	GD	Pts	Promotion or relegation
1	(Russian Soviet Federative Socialist Republic)	Uralmash Sverdlovsk	42	23	13	6	62	21	+41	59	Promoted to First Liga
2	(Russian Soviet Federative Socialist Republic)	Tekstilshchik Kamyshin	42	22	8	12	73	49	+24	52	Promoted to First Liga
3	(Russian Soviet Federative Socialist Republic)	Krylia Sovetov Samara	42	19	11	12	53	35	+18	49	
4	(Russian Soviet Federative Socialist Republic)	Metallurg Lipetsk	42	18	13	11	56	43	+13	49	
5	(Azerbaijan Soviet Socialist Republic)	Kyapaz Gyanja	42	21	5	16	66	65	+1	47	
6	(Russian Soviet Federative Socialist Republic)	Tsement Novorossiysk	42	19	9	14	65	54	+11	47	
7	(Russian Soviet Federative Socialist Republic)	Druzhba Maykop	42	19	7	16	56	56	0	45	
8	(Russian Soviet Federative Socialist Republic)	Torpedo Ryazan	42	15	15	12	41	44	−3	45	
9	(Russian Soviet Federative Socialist Republic)	Dynamo Bryansk	42	18	8	16	59	53	+6	44	
10	(Russian Soviet Federative Socialist Republic)	Zvezda Perm	42	15	14	13	68	45	+23	44	
11	(Azerbaijan Soviet Socialist Republic)	Goyazan Gazakh	42	19	4	19	56	56	0	42	
12	(Russian Soviet Federative Socialist Republic)	Torpedo Vladimir	50	19	12	19	84	66	+18	50	
13	(Russian Soviet Federative Socialist Republic)	Terek Grozny	50	20	9	21	59	59	0	49	
14	(Russian Soviet Federative Socialist Republic)	Gastello Ufa	50	18	13	19	54	55	−1	49	
15	(Russian Soviet Federative Socialist Republic)	Zenit Izhevsk	50	20	8	22	59	64	−5	48	
16	(Russian Soviet Federative Socialist Republic)	Nart Cherkessk	50	15	15	20	48	55	−7	45	
17	(Russian Soviet Federative Socialist Republic)	Torpedo Volzhskiy	50	15	15	20	58	73	−15	45	
18	(Russian Soviet Federative Socialist Republic)	Sokol Saratov	50	17	10	23	47	59	−12	44	
19	(Russian Soviet Federative Socialist Republic)	Mashuk Pyatigorsk	50	15	13	22	52	70	−18	43	Relegated
20	(Russian Soviet Federative Socialist Republic)	SKA Rostov-na-Donu	50	17	8	25	56	75	−19	42	Relegated
21	(Russian Soviet Federative Socialist Republic)	Zarya Kaluga	50	11	20	19	48	60	−12	42	Relegated
22	(Russian Soviet Federative Socialist Republic)	Volgar Astrakhan	50	13	15	22	58	77	−19	41	Relegated

Representation

- Russian SFSR 20
- Azerbaijan SSR 2

=== East ===
Pos	Rep	Team	Pld	W	D	L	GF	GA	GD	Pts	Promotion or relegation
1	(Uzbek Soviet Socialist Republic)	Neftyanik Fergana	42	23	13	6	62	21	+41	59	Promoted to First Liga
2	(Uzbek Soviet Socialist Republic)	Novbakhor Namangan	42	22	8	12	73	49	+24	52	Promoted to First Liga
3	(Russian Soviet Federative Socialist Republic)	Okean Nakhodka	42	19	11	12	53	35	+18	49	
4	(Russian Soviet Federative Socialist Republic)	Amur Blagoveshchensk	42	18	13	11	56	43	+13	49	
5	(Kazakh Soviet Socialist Republic)	Meliorator Chimkent	42	21	5	16	66	65	+1	47	
6	(Kazakh Soviet Socialist Republic)	Khimik Jambul	42	19	9	14	65	54	+11	47	
7	(Uzbek Soviet Socialist Republic)	Avtomobilist Kokand	42	19	7	16	56	56	0	45	
8	(Turkmen Soviet Socialist Republic)	Kopet-Dag Ashkhabad	42	15	15	12	41	44	−3	45	
9	(Kirghiz Soviet Socialist Republic)	Alga Frunze	42	18	8	16	59	53	+6	44	
10	(Kazakh Soviet Socialist Republic)	Traktor Pavlodar	42	15	14	13	68	45	+23	44	
11	(Russian Soviet Federative Socialist Republic)	Zvezda Irkutsk	42	19	4	19	56	56	0	42	
12	(Uzbek Soviet Socialist Republic)	Sogdiana Jizak	50	19	12	19	84	66	+18	50	
13	(Russian Soviet Federative Socialist Republic)	Dinamo Barnaul	50	20	9	21	59	59	0	49	
14	(Kazakh Soviet Socialist Republic)	Shakhter Karaganda	50	18	13	19	54	55	−1	49	
15	(Tajik Soviet Socialist Republic)	Vakhsh Kurgan-Tyube	50	20	8	22	59	64	−5	48	
16	(Kazakh Soviet Socialist Republic)	Tselinnik Tselinograd	50	15	15	20	48	55	−7	45	
17	(Kazakh Soviet Socialist Republic)	Ekibastuzets Ekibastuz	50	15	15	20	58	73	−15	45	
18		Surkhan Termez	50	17	10	23	47	59	−12	44	
19		Kaysar Kzil-Orda	50	15	13	22	52	70	−18	43	Relegated
20	(Russian Soviet Federative Socialist Republic)	Irtysh Omsk	50	17	8	25	56	75	−19	42	Relegated
21		Zarafshan Navoi	50	11	20	19	48	60	−12	42	Relegated
22		Spartak Andizhan	50	13	15	22	58	77	−19	41	Relegated

Representation

- Kazakh SSR: 7
- Uzbek SSR 7
- Russian SFSR: 5
- Turkmen SSR: 1
- Kyrgyz SSR: 1
- Tajik SSR: 1

=== Baltic ===
Pos	Team	Pld	W	D	L	GF	GA	GD	Pts	Qualification
1	(Lithuanian Soviet Socialist Republic) Žalgiris Vilnius	32	27	4	1	104	11	+93	58	Qualification to Lithuanian championship play-off and founding of A Lyga
2	(Lithuanian Soviet Socialist Republic) Sirijus Klaipėda	32	19	9	4	47	19	+28	47	Qualification to Lithuanian championship play-off and founding of A Lyga
3	(Lithuanian Soviet Socialist Republic) Ekranas Panevėžys	32	19	8	5	62	24	+38	46	Qualification to Lithuanian championship play-off and founding of A Lyga
4	(Russian Soviet Federative Socialist Republic) Progress Cherniakhovsk	32	19	4	9	46	33	+13	42	Moved to the Soviet Second League B
5	(Lithuanian Soviet Socialist Republic) Jovaras Mažeikiai	32	16	8	8	40	25	+15	40	Qualification to Lithuanian championship play-off and founding of A Lyga
6	(Lithuanian Soviet Socialist Republic) Inkaras Kaunas	32	15	9	8	54	25	+29	39	The A Lyga founding teams
7	(Lithuanian Soviet Socialist Republic) Banga Kaunas	32	13	11	8	45	30	+15	37	The A Lyga founding teams
8	(Latvian Soviet Socialist Republic) RAF Jelgava	32	13	10	9	44	37	+7	36	Relegation to regional competitions
9	(Lithuanian Soviet Socialist Republic) Sakalas Šiauliai	32	11	12	9	41	32	+9	34	The A Lyga founding teams
10	(Estonian Soviet Socialist Republic) Sport Tallinn	32	11	11	10	43	39	+4	33	Defunct after end of season
11	(Lithuanian Soviet Socialist Republic) Neris Vilnius	32	10	8	14	27	47	−20	28	The A Lyga founding teams
12	(Latvian Soviet Socialist Republic) Celtnieks Daugavpils	32	8	7	17	29	45	−16	23	Relegation to the Latvian SSR Higher League
13	(Latvian Soviet Socialist Republic) Torpedo Rīga	32	6	10	16	29	49	−20	22	Relegation to the Latvian SSR Higher League
14	(Latvian Soviet Socialist Republic) KKI Daugava Riga	32	4	13	15	16	49	−33	21	Relegation to the Latvian SSR Higher League
15	(Latvian Soviet Socialist Republic) Pārdaugava Riga	32	5	8	19	24	53	−29	18	Relegation to the Latvian SSR Higher League
16	(Latvian Soviet Socialist Republic) Metalurgs Liepāja	32	4	5	23	20	97	−77	13	Relegation to the Latvian SSR Higher League
17	(Lithuanian Soviet Socialist Republic) FK Sūduva Marijampolė	32	1	5	26	13	69	−56	7	The A Lyga founding teams

Source: rsssf.com
- ASK Fosforit Tallinn quit the competition after 14 games

=== Lower Second League ===
==== Group 1 ====
Pos	Team	Pld	W	D	L	GF	GA	GD	Pts	Promotion
1	Torpedo Zaporizhzhia	36	23	8	5	53	25	+28	54	Promoted
2	Sudnobudivnyk Mykolaiv	36	24	5	7	60	31	+29	53	Promoted
3	Avanhard Rivne	36	21	11	4	53	27	+26	53	
4	Polissya Zhytomyr	36	23	5	8	53	27	+26	51	
5	Krystal Kherson	36	18	9	9	61	44	+17	45	
6	Naftovyk Okhtyrka	36	17	10	9	45	29	+16	44	
7	Prykarpattia Ivano-Frankivsk	36	15	8	13	32	32	0	38	
8	Shakhtar Pavlohrad	36	14	9	13	37	39	−2	37	
9	Dynamo Bila Tserkva	36	14	7	15	37	38	−1	35	
10	Kolos Nikopol	36	13	9	14	43	40	+3	35	
11	SKA Kyiv	36	14	4	18	40	41	−1	32	
12	Desna Chernihiv	36	13	6	17	35	39	−4	32	
13	Chaika Sevastopol	36	11	8	17	35	46	−11	30	
14	Podillya Khmelnytskyi	36	10	10	16	37	46	−9	30	
15	Kryvbas Kryvyi Rih	36	10	6	20	40	53	−13	26	
16	Dnipro Cherkasy	36	8	7	21	26	48	−22	23	
17	Okean Kerch	36	7	9	20	31	55	−24	23	
18	Mayak Kharkiv	36	6	10	20	19	48	−29	22	
19	Zirka Kirovohrad	36	7	7	22	32	61	−29	21	

==== Group 2 ====
Pos	Team	Pld	W	D	L	GF	GA	GD	Pts	Promotion
1	FC Ararat-2 Yerevan (C)	22	17	3	2	77	25	+52	37	Promoted
2	Araks Hoktemberyan	22	15	5	2	68	27	+41	35	
3	Spitak	22	13	3	6	55	31	+24	29	
4	Artsakh Stepanakert	22	9	5	8	37	28	+9	23	
5	Kapan	22	10	2	10	33	36	−3	22	
6	Malatia Yerevan	22	9	2	11	39	45	−6	20	
7	Zvartnots Echmiadzin	22	8	4	10	31	45	−14	20	
8	Koshkagorts-Nairi Yerevan	22	7	4	11	33	53	−20	18	
9	Pahatsoyagorts Noyemberyan	22	6	5	11	21	51	−30	17	
10	Zoravan Yegvard	22	5	6	11	36	48	−12	16	
11	FIMA Yerevan	22	4	7	11	28	57	−29	15	
12	Nairi Yerevan	22	4	4	14	34	46	−12	12	

(C) Champions

==== Group 3 ====
Pos	Team	Pld	W	D	L	GF	GA	GD	Pts	Promotion
1	Karabakh Agdam	34	25	7	2	79	18	+61	57	Promoted
2	FC Khazar Sumgait	34	21	5	8	102	41	+61	47	
3	FC Araz Nakhichevan	34	20	7	7	59	21	+38	47	
4	FC Khazar Lenkoran	34	20	3	11	65	42	+23	43	
5	FC Stroitel Baku	34	18	6	10	37	35	+2	42	[+]
6	FC Araz Baku	34	14	10	10	48	41	+7	38	[+]
7	FC Pambigchi Barda	34	16	3	15	45	52	−7	35	[+]
8	FC Inshaatchi Shemakha	34	14	5	15	34	50	−16	33	[+]
9	FC Shakhdag Kusari	34	14	4	16	53	54	−1	32	[+]
10	FC Kyur Mingechaur	34	13	6	15	41	42	−1	32	[+]
11	FC Stroitel Sabirabad	34	13	6	15	52	59	−7	32	[+]
12	FC Shakhdag Kuba	34	9	9	16	43	67	−24	27	[+]

==== Group 4 ====
Pos	Team	Pld	W	D	L	GF	GA	GD	Pts	Promotion
1	FC Torpedo Taganrog	32	23	5	4	55	10	+45	51	Promoted
2	FC APK Azov	32	21	8	3	63	22	+41	50	Promoted
3	FC Spartak Anapa	32	22	5	5	66	25	+41	49	
4	FC Zvezda Gorodishche	32	18	4	10	50	30	+20	40	
5	FC Lokomotiv Mineralnyye Vody	32	18	3	11	45	38	+7	39	
6	FC Uralan Elista	32	14	9	9	43	29	+14	37	
7	FC Atommash Volgodonsk	32	14	4	14	42	42	0	32	
8	FC Khimik Belorechensk	32	12	7	13	40	44	−4	31	
9	FC Avtodor Vladikavkaz	32	11	8	13	35	38	−3	30	[+]
10	FC Start Yeisk	32	11	4	17	34	40	−6	26	[+]
11	FC Dinamo Makhachkala	32	10	6	16	36	47	−11	26	
12	FC Signal Izobilny	32	9	7	16	32	43	−11	25	
13	FC Torpedo Armavir	32	7	10	15	25	46	−21	24	[+]
14	FC Shakhtyor Shakhty	32	10	3	19	29	43	−14	23	
15	FC Remontnik Prokhladny	32	10	2	20	40	64	−24	22	[+]
16	FC Niva Slavyansk-na-Kubani	32	6	8	18	23	56	−33	20	[+]
17	FC Metallurg Stary Oskol	32	6	7	19	24	65	−41	19	[+]

==== Group 5 ====
Pos	Team	Pld	W	D	L	GF	GA	GD	Pts	Promotion
1	FC Asmaral Moscow	32	24	4	4	63	17	+46	52	Promoted
2	FC Tighina	32	22	5	5	53	22	+31	49	Promoted [MDA]
3	FC Znamya Arzamas	32	17	10	5	37	19	+18	44	[+]
4	FC Salyut Belgorod	32	14	7	11	45	43	+2	35	
5	FC Spartak Tambov	32	12	9	11	35	34	+1	33	
6	FC Saturn Ramenskoye	32	11	11	10	34	31	+3	33	
7	FC Gomselmash Gomel	32	14	4	14	48	48	0	32	[BLR]
8	FC Buran Voronezh	32	13	5	14	40	28	+12	31	[+]
9	FC Torgmash Lyubertsy	32	10	10	12	36	42	−6	30	[+]
10	FC Khimik Dzerzhinsk	32	13	3	16	42	43	−1	29	
11	FC Spartak Oryol	32	11	7	14	28	35	−7	29	
12	FC Kuban Barannikovskiy	32	10	9	13	41	46	−5	29	[+]
13	FC Avangard Kursk	32	11	6	15	30	49	−19	28	
14	FC Oka Kolomna	32	10	5	17	31	47	−16	25	
15	FC Arsenal Tula	32	8	8	16	31	48	−17	24	
16	FC Khimik Semiluki	32	7	7	18	25	46	−21	21	
17	FC Znamya Truda Orekhovo-Zuyevo	32	6	8	18	21	42	−21	20	

==== Group 6 ====
Pos	Team	Pld	W	D	L	GF	GA	GD	Pts	Promotion
1	FC Volga Tver	32	18	11	3	53	28	+25	47	Promoted
2	FC KIM Vitebsk	32	20	6	6	59	31	+28	46	Promoted [BLR]
3	FC Textilshchik Ivanovo	32	18	7	7	60	24	+36	43	
4	FC RAF Jelgava	32	17	9	6	54	25	+29	43	[LVA]
5	FC Khimik Cherepovets	32	16	10	6	40	19	+21	42	
6	FC Mashinostroitel Pskov	32	14	12	6	45	34	+11	40	[+]
7	FC Olimpia Liepaja	32	14	9	9	36	37	−1	37	[LVA]
8	FC Dinamo-2 Moskva	32	13	11	8	39	26	+13	37	
9	FC Kirovets Leningrad	32	12	13	7	41	30	+11	37	
10	FC Spartak Kostroma	32	11	7	14	35	36	−1	29	
11	FC Prometheus-Dinamo Leningrad	32	8	12	12	32	38	−6	28	
12	FC Volzhanin Kineshma	32	7	14	11	25	41	−16	28	
13	FC Granite Penza	32	9	7	16	28	52	−24	25	[+]
14	FC Dinamo Vologda	32	7	5	20	27	54	−27	19	
15	FC CSKA-2 Moskva	32	5	6	21	14	40	−26	16	
16	FC Zvezda Moskva	32	5	5	22	20	53	−33	15	
17	FC Spartak Petrozavodsk	32	4	4	24	18	58	−40	12	[+]

==== Group 7 ====
Pos	Team	Pld	W	D	L	GF	GA	GD	Pts	Promotion
1	FC KamAZ Naberezhnyye Chelny	32	21	5	6	67	26	+41	47	Promoted
2	FC Lada Togliatti	32	20	6	6	63	20	+43	46	Promoted
3	FC Rubin Kazan	32	18	10	4	48	15	+33	46	
4	FC Druzhba Yoshkar-Ola	32	21	2	9	66	30	+36	44	
5	FC Torpedo Miass	32	20	4	8	48	23	+25	44	
6	FC Zenit Chelyabinsk	32	16	7	9	48	30	+18	39	
7	FC Dinamo Kirov	32	15	7	10	50	26	+24	37	
8	FC Stal Cheboksary	32	13	9	10	32	20	+12	35	
9	FC Uralets Nizhniy Tagil	32	13	8	11	38	37	+1	34	
10	FC Metallurg Magnitogorsk	32	10	11	11	44	44	0	31	
11	FC Zauralye Kurgan	32	11	8	13	32	32	0	30	
12	FC Svetotekhnika Saransk	32	10	7	15	33	55	−22	27	
13	FC Avtopribor Oktyabrskiy	32	7	13	12	22	34	−12	27	[+]
14	FC Bashselmash Neftekamsk	32	9	8	15	30	38	−8	26	[+]
15	FC Gazovik Orenburg	32	4	5	23	16	71	−55	13	
16	FC Kauchuk Sterlitamak	32	5	2	25	31	83	−52	12	[+]
17	FC Zarya Podgorny	32	1	4	27	14	98	−84	6	[+]

==== Group 8 ====
Pos	Team	Pld	W	D	L	GF	GA	GD	Pts	Promotion
1	FC Vostok Ust-Kamenogorsk	36	28	2	6	75	29	+46	58	Promoted
2	FC Zhetysu Taldy-Kurgan	36	25	5	6	73	26	+47	55	Promoted
3	FC Spartak Semipalatinsk	36	22	9	5	65	24	+41	53	
4	FC Aktyubinets Aktyubinsk	36	23	5	8	70	19	+51	51	
5	FC Kustanayets Kustanay	36	21	5	10	44	23	+21	47	
6	FC Jezkazganets Jezkazgan	36	20	5	11	49	39	+10	45	
7	FC Montazhnik Turkestan	36	17	4	15	52	56	−4	38	[+]
8	FC Gornyak Khromtau	36	16	6	14	44	37	+7	38	[+]
9	FC Metallurg Yermak	36	16	5	15	58	46	+12	37	[+]
10	FC Sokhibkor Khalkabad	36	14	8	14	37	34	+3	36	[UZB]
11	FC Spartak Kokchetav	36	15	5	16	43	43	0	35	[+]
12	FC Metallist Petropavlovsk	36	17	0	19	42	46	−4	34	
13	FC Ak-Kanat Uzun-Agach	36	13	6	17	30	40	−10	32	[+]
14	FC Aktau Shevchenko	36	12	6	18	32	49	−17	30	[+]
15	FC Bulat Temirtau	36	11	6	19	36	55	−19	28	[+]
16	FC Khimik Almalyk	36	9	7	20	34	54	−20	25	[+] [UZB]
17	FC Dostuk Sokuluk	36	6	9	21	27	53	−26	21	[+] [KGZ]
18	FC Uralets Uralsk	36	7	4	25	25	67	−42	18	
19	FC Metallurg Balkhash	36	0	3	33	21	117	−96	3	[+]

==== Group 9 ====
Pos	Team	Pld	W	D	L	GF	GA	GD	Pts	Promotion
1	FC Nuravshon Bukhara	38	28	7	3	116	25	+91	63	Promoted [+] [UZB]
2	FC Kasansayets Kasansay	38	24	5	9	83	34	+49	53	Promoted [UZB]
3	FC Yangiyer	38	20	5	13	67	56	+11	45	[UZB]
4	FC Dinamo Samarkand	38	19	7	12	67	39	+28	45	[UZB]
5	FC Chirchik	38	17	11	10	50	37	+13	45	[UZB]
6	FC Khojent Leninabad	38	19	6	13	58	53	+5	44	[TJK]
7	FC Traktor Tashkent	38	20	2	16	61	45	+16	42	[UZB]
8	FC Alay Osh	38	17	6	15	56	46	+10	40	[KGZ]
9	FC Yeshlik Turakurgan	38	17	6	15	64	56	+8	40	[+] [UZB]
10	FC Ahal Akdashayak	38	18	3	17	45	48	−3	39	[TKM]
11	FC Merv Mary	38	18	3	17	52	58	−6	39	[+] [TKM]
12	FC Regar Tursun-Zade	38	15	7	16	65	58	+7	37	[+] [TJK]
13	FC Sverdlovets Tashkent Region	38	14	9	15	61	62	−1	37	[UZB]
14	FC Tselinnik Turtkul	38	15	5	18	53	77	−24	35	[UZB]
15	FC Shakhtyor Angren	38	12	7	19	43	55	−12	31	[+] [UZB]
16	FC Aralvodstroyevets Nukus	38	12	6	20	40	66	−26	30	[+] [UZB]
17	FC Jeyhun Urgench	38	12	6	20	34	65	−31	30	[UZB]
18	FC Nebitchi Nebit-Dag	38	11	4	23	49	82	−33	26	[+] [TKM]
19	FC Geolog Karshi	38	8	8	22	34	70	−36	24	[+] [UZB]
20	FC Sherdor Samarkand	38	7	1	30	34	100	−66	15	[+] [UZB]

==== Group 10 ====
Pos	Team	Pld	W	D	L	GF	GA	GD	Pts	Promotion
1	FC Sakhalin Yuzhno-Sakhalinsk	28	16	9	3	34	13	+21	41	Promoted
2	FC Lokomotiv Chita	28	18	4	6	61	27	+34	40	
3	FC Vulkan Petropavlovsk-Kamchatskiy	28	16	6	6	38	18	+20	38	
4	FC SKA Khabarovsk	28	13	8	7	44	24	+20	34	
5	FC Luch Vladivostok	28	10	14	4	31	21	+10	34	
6	FC Tom Tomsk	28	14	5	9	29	17	+12	33	
7	FC Amur Komsomolsk-na-Amure	28	13	4	11	33	32	+1	30	
8	FC Metallurg Novokuznetsk	28	11	8	9	27	26	+1	30	
9	FC Avtomobilist Krasnoyarsk	28	11	7	10	28	26	+2	29	
10	FC Angara Angarsk	28	9	7	12	29	38	−9	25	[+]
11	FC Chkalovets Novosibirsk	28	8	6	14	25	37	−12	22	
12	FC Torpedo Rubtsovsk	28	9	3	16	31	43	−12	21	
13	FC Selenga Ulan-Ude	28	6	8	14	26	44	−18	20	
14	FC Progress Biysk	28	4	10	14	22	38	−16	18	
15	FC Shakhtyor Leninsk-Kuznetskiy	28	2	1	25	12	66	−54	5	[+]

=== Top goalscorers ===
Top League

- Oleh Protasov (Dinamo Kiev) – 12 goals

First League

- Igor Shkvyrin (Pakhtakor Tashkent) – 37 goals
