= 1991 in Lithuanian football =

- A Lyga champions
- FK Žalgiris Vilnius
- 1 Lyga champions
- Žalgiris-2 Vilnius
- Lithuanian Cup winners
- FK Žalgiris Vilnius
- Lithuanian national team
- 1991 Baltic Cup
- Lithuanian Footballer of the Year
- Valdas Ivanauskas

1991 in Lithuanian football was the first season of competitive association football in Lithuania as an independent nation since regaining independence from the Soviet Union in 1990.

The Lithuanian Football Federation (LFF) organised three football leagues: A Lyga (the highest), 1 Lyga (second-tier), and 2 Lyga (third-tier), which comprises several zones. 1991 was a transitional year: it was decided to adopt western fall-spring model. Therefore, the season lasted only one round from March to June. Prior to that there were the 1990 Baltic League and the 1990 Lithuanian Top League.

== National leagues ==
=== A Lyga ===
==== Regular season ====
Pos	Team	Pld	W	D	L	GF	GA	GD	Pts	Qualification or relegation
1	Žalgiris (C)	14	11	2	1	31	8	+23	24	Qualification to championship play-off
2	Banga Kaunas	14	9	4	1	24	10	+14	22	Qualification to championship play-off
3	Neris	14	8	5	1	17	5	+12	21	Qualification to championship play-off
4	Ekranas	14	10	1	3	24	10	+14	21	Qualification to championship play-off
5	Sirijus	14	8	4	2	24	10	+14	20	
6	Vilija (R)	14	5	4	5	23	21	+2	14	Defunct after end of season
7	Granitas Klaipėda	14	5	4	5	15	14	+1	14	
8	Panerys	14	6	2	6	20	13	+7	14	
9	Sakalas	14	5	3	6	13	16	−3	13	
10	Elektronas	14	4	2	8	15	23	−8	10	
11	Vienybė	14	3	4	7	9	16	−7	10	
12	Jovaras	14	3	3	8	13	18	−5	9	
13	Tauras Šiauliai	14	3	2	9	9	26	−17	8	
14	Inkaras	14	2	4	8	7	15	−8	8	
15	Sūduva (R)	14	0	2	12	5	44	−39	2	Relegation to 1 Lyga

(C) Champions; (R) Relegated

==== Championship play-off ====
===== Semifinals =====
Žalgiris	0 – 1 4 – 1	FK Ekranas

Neris	2 – 1 2 – 1	Banga Kaunas

===== Third place match =====
Banga Kaunas	3 – 1	Ekranas

===== Final =====
Žalgiris	3 – 1	Neris

=== 1 Lyga ===
Pos	Team	Pld	W	D	L	GF	GA	GD	Pts
1	Žalgiris-2 Vilnius	15	12	1	2	36	10	+26	25
2	FK Geležinis Vilkas Vilnius	15	10	4	1	38	17	+21	24
3	Snaigė Alytus	15	9	5	1	30	6	+24	23
4	Melioratorius Pasvalys	15	8	4	3	25	13	+12	20
5	Nevėžis Kėdainiai	15	7	4	4	24	19	+5	18
6	FK Mastis Telšiai	15	8	1	6	27	19	+8	17
7	FK Minija Kretinga	15	6	5	4	22	20	+2	17
8	Inter Sniečkus	15	7	2	6	31	24	+7	16
9	FK Politechnika Kaunas	15	6	3	6	23	20	+3	15
10	Orionas Klaipėda	15	6	2	7	13	20	−7	14
11	Šviesa Vilnius	15	4	6	5	18	13	+5	14
12	Robotas Plungė	15	4	4	7	15	19	−4	12
13	Universitetas Vilnius	15	4	4	7	24	19	+5	12
14	FK Sveikata Kybartai	15	4	3	8	16	27	−11	11
15	Dainava Alytus	15	0	1	14	6	53	−47	1
16	FK Širvinta Vilkaviškis	15	0	1	14	2	51	−49	1

=== 2 Lyga ===
==== Zone West ====
Pos	Team	Pld	W	D	L	GF	GA	GD	Pts
1	Banga Gargždai	13	9	3	1	38	10	+28	21
2	Papartis Šiauliai	13	7	4	2	18	10	+8	18
3	Cementininkas Naujoji Akmenė	13	8	2	3	21	13	+8	18
4	Zondra Seda	13	5	6	2	16	10	+6	16
5	Liepsna Klaipėda	13	7	1	5	33	16	+17	15
6	Žėrutis Radviliškis	13	4	6	3	16	16	0	14
7	Salanta Salantai	13	5	3	5	17	17	0	13
8	Venta Daugeliai	13	4	4	5	16	17	−1	12
9	Logika Šiauliai	13	5	2	6	20	20	0	12
10	Mituva Jurbarkas	13	5	2	6	18	19	−1	12
11	Elektronas-2 Tauragė	13	4	3	6	24	21	+3	11
12	Okeanas Klaipėda	13	4	1	8	11	40	−29	9
13	Kruoja Pakruojas	13	2	2	9	11	32	−21	6
14	GPK Joniškis	13	2	1	10	11	29	−18	5

==== Zone East ====
Pos	Team	Pld	W	D	L	GF	GA	GD	Pts
1	Makabi Vilnius	16	12	4	0	46	8	+38	28
2	Aidas Panevėžys	16	13	0	3	55	21	+34	26
3	Azotas Jonava	16	8	5	3	44	20	+24	21
4	Utenis Utena	16	9	3	4	21	20	+1	21
5	Rasa Anykščiai	16	7	6	3	28	17	+11	20
6	Versmė Birštonas	16	10	0	6	34	33	+1	20
7	Polonia Vilnius	16	8	4	4	37	31	+6	20
8	Klevas Jonava	17	9	1	7	40	30	+10	19
9	Kaitra Lentvaris	16	5	6	5	19	23	−4	16
10	Aušra Vilnius	16	5	5	6	31	32	−1	15
11	Merkys Varėna	16	6	2	8	29	37	−8	14
12	Panerys-2 Vilnius	16	5	4	7	27	18	+9	14
13	Kibirkštis Vilnius	16	5	1	10	22	35	−13	11
14	Olimpia Panevėžys	16	3	3	10	15	35	−20	9
15	Technika Nemenčinė	15	1	5	9	17	41	−24	7
16	Modulis Pabradė	16	3	1	12	14	41	−27	7
17	Lokomotyvas Kybartai	16	2	0	14	20	67	−47	4

== National cup ==
Žalgiris Vilnius	1–0 (a.e.t.)	Tauras Šiauliai

Žalgirio stadionas, Kaunas

== National team ==
15 November 1991 1991 Baltic Cup	Lithuania	4–1	Estonia	Klaipėda, Lithuania

17 November 1991 1991 Baltic Cup	Lithuania	1–1	Latvia	Klaipėda, Lithuania
