= Arūnas Pukelevičius =

Lithuanian footballer

Personal information
- Date of birth: 9 May 1973 (age 53)
- Place of birth: Kaunas, Lithuania
- Height: 1.88 m (6 ft 2 in)
- Position: Midfielder

Senior career*
Years	Team	Apps	(Gls)
1990	Dainava Alytus		
1990	Viltis		
1991–1997	Žalgiris		
1993	→ Neris (loan)	6	(0)
1998	Wisła Kraków	2	(0)
1999	Shenzhen Ping An		
2000	Žalgiris		
2001–2002	Vėtra		
2003	Šviesa	6	(0)
2004	TVMK	7	(0)
2005	Alytis		
2005–2006	Prelegentai		

International career
1996–2003	Lithuania	4	(0)
- * Club domestic league appearances and goals

Arūnas Pukelevičius (born 9 May 1973) is a Lithuanian former professional footballer who played as a midfielder.

== Honours ==
Žalgiris

- A Lyga: 1991, 1991–92
- Lithuanian Cup: 1991, 1992–93, 1993–94, 1996–97
