= 1993–94 A Lyga =

A Lyga
- Season: 1993–94
- Champions: ROMAR Mažeikiai
- Relegated: FK Gelezinis Vilkas; FK FK Zydrius; FK Tauras-Karsuva
- UEFA Cup: ROMAR Mažeikiai
- UEFA Cup Winner's Cup: FK Zalgiris

The Lithuanian A Lyga 1993–94 was the fourth season of top-tier football in Lithuania. The season started on 29 July 1993 and ended on 29 May 1994. It was contested by 12 teams, and ROMAR Mažeikiai won the championship.

== Final table ==
Pos	Team	Pld	W	D	L	GF	GA	GD	Pts	Qualification or relegation
1	ROMAR (C)	22	17	4	1	53	10	+43	38	Qualification to UEFA Cup preliminary round
2	Žalgiris	22	17	3	2	57	13	+44	37	Qualification to Cup Winners' Cup qualifying round
3	Ekranas	22	13	5	4	48	12	+36	31	
4	Panerys	22	12	5	5	35	17	+18	29	
5	FBK Kaunas	22	12	4	6	31	18	+13	28	
6	Aras	22	6	9	7	31	27	+4	21	
7	Sirijus	22	7	5	10	25	31	−6	19	
8	Inkaras	22	4	8	10	22	34	−12	16	
9	Sakalas	22	6	3	13	22	50	−28	15	
10	Geležinis Vilkas (R)	22	3	7	12	14	50	−36	13	Relegation to 1 Lyga
11	Žydrius (R)	22	1	7	14	12	46	−34	9	Relegation to 1 Lyga
12	Tauras-Karšuva (R)	22	2	4	16	13	55	−42	8	Relegation to 1 Lyga

Source: RSSSF.com
(C) Champions; (R) Relegated

== Results ==
Home \ Away	ARA	EKR	FBK	GEL	INK	PAN	ROM	SAK	SIR	TAU	ŽAL	ŽYD
Aras		0–0	2–2	3–0	2–2	1–1	0–1	3–0	0–2	2–2	0–1	3–1
Ekranas	1–1		1–0	4–0	4–0	0–0	2–0	10–0	1–0	1–0	1–2	10–1
FBK Kaunas	1–0	2–1		1–1	2–0	0–1	0–0	5–0	1–0	2–0	0–3	3–0
Geležinis Vilkas	0–1	0–0	1–2		1–1	0–3	0–1	1–0	0–2	0–1	1–7	1–0
Inkaras	1–1	0–1	1–0	2–2		1–1	1–1	3–0	1–2	4–0	0–1	2–0
Panerys	1–0	1–2	0–2	1–1	1–0		1–3	2–0	2–0	4–0	4–1	1–0
ROMAR	3–1	2–1	3–0	9–0	8–0	2–1		3–1	6–1	4–0	1–0	+:- (Note: The match between ROMAR and Žydrius was counted as a goalless win for ROMAR.)
Sakalas	1–1	0–2	1–2	1–0	2–1	1–2	0–1		2–1	0–1	1–1	1–1
Sirijus	1–4	1–0	1–1	1–1	2–0	1–1	0–1	0–3		4–0	0–3	2–2
Tauras-Karšuva	1–1	0–1	0–3	1–2	2–2	1–6	1–4	2–3	0–3		0–4	1–1
Žalgiris	5–2	1–1	2–1	7–0	1–0	1–0	0–0	8–0	1–0	3–0		4–1
Žydrius	0–3	1–4	0–1	2–2	0–0	0–1	0–0	0–5	1–1	1–0	0–1	

Legend: Blue = home team win; Yellow = draw; Red = away team win.

== See also ==
- 1993 in Lithuanian football
- 1994 in Lithuanian football
