= 1993 in Lithuanian football =

- A Lyga champions
- FK Ekranas
- 1 Lyga champions
- Azotas Jonava
- Lithuanian Cup winners
- FK Žalgiris Vilnius
- Lithuanian national team
- 1993 Baltic Cup; 1994 FIFA World Cup qualification
- Lithuanian Footballer of the Year
- Valdas Ivanauskas

The 1993 season was the third year of competitive football (soccer) in Lithuania as an independent nation since regaining independence from the Soviet Union in 1991. In the Premier League, named A Lyga, fourteen teams competed, with FK Ekranas winning the title.

== National Leagues ==
=== A Lyga ===
==== Regular season ====
Pos	Team	Pld	W	D	L	GF	GA	GD	Pts	Qualification
1	Ekranas	13	10	2	1	27	3	+24	22	Qualification to championship round
2	Žalgiris	13	10	2	1	32	6	+26	22	Qualification to championship round
3	Panerys	13	10	1	2	34	14	+20	21	Qualification to championship round
4	Sirijus	13	7	4	2	20	7	+13	18	Qualification to championship round
5	Banga Kaunas	13	7	3	3	24	9	+15	17	Qualification to championship round
6	ROMAR	13	6	2	5	13	13	0	14	Qualification to championship round
7	Aras	13	4	5	4	16	13	+3	13	Qualification to championship round
8	Geležinis Vilkas	13	3	6	4	12	17	−5	12	Qualification to championship round
9	Inkaras	13	4	3	6	16	20	−4	11	Qualification to relegation round
10	Neris	13	3	3	7	15	20	−5	9	Qualification to relegation round
11	Snaigė	13	3	2	8	8	27	−19	8	Qualification to relegation round
12	Sakalas	13	2	2	9	8	23	−15	6	Qualification to relegation round
13	Tauras-Karšuva	13	2	2	9	6	26	−20	6	Qualification to relegation round
14	Minija	13	1	1	11	5	38	−33	3	Qualification to relegation round

Source: rsssf.com

==== Championship round ====
Pos	Team	Pld	W	D	L	GF	GA	GD	Pts	Qualification
1	Ekranas (C)	27	20	6	1	50	8	+42	46	Qualification to Champions League preliminary round
2	Žalgiris	27	18	7	2	54	13	+41	43	Qualification to Cup Winners' Cup qualifying round
3	Panerys	27	16	4	7	53	29	+24	36	
4	Sirijus	27	11	9	7	36	29	+7	31	
5	Banga Kaunas	27	11	5	11	36	29	+7	27	
6	ROMAR	27	11	4	12	27	27	0	26	
7	Aras	27	8	8	11	26	33	−7	24	
8	Geležinis Vilkas	27	5	8	14	25	43	−18	18	

Source: rsssf.com
(C) Champions

==== Relegation round ====
Pos	Team	Pld	W	D	L	GF	GA	GD	Pts	Relegation
9	Inkaras	23	8	6	9	28	28	0	22	
10	Sakalas	23	9	3	11	23	30	−7	21	
11	Neris (R)	23	7	5	11	27	31	−4	19	Defunct in the next season
12	Tauras-Karšuva	23	6	6	11	14	33	−19	18	
13	Snaigė (R)	23	6	3	14	14	36	−22	15	Relegation to 1 Lyga
14	Minija (R)	23	2	4	17	12	56	−44	8	Relegation to 1 Lyga

Source: rsssf.com
(R) Relegated

=== 1 Lyga ===
Pos	Team	Pld	W	D	L	GF	GA	GD	Pts
1	Azotas Jonava	24	18	2	4	73	24	+49	38
2	FK Mastis Telšiai	24	14	7	3	50	21	+29	35
3	Mūša Ukmergė	23	12	9	2	52	16	+36	33
4	Tauras Šiauliai	23	14	4	5	37	19	+18	32
5	Cementininkas Naujoji Akmenė	24	12	7	5	37	33	+4	31
6	Aidas Panevėžys	23	12	6	5	43	22	+21	30
7	FK Banga Gargždai	24	10	8	6	27	27	0	28
8	Inter Visaginas	24	10	6	8	31	28	+3	26
9	AFK Vilnius	23	8	6	9	33	25	+8	22
10	Chemikas Kedainiai	24	6	8	10	29	27	+2	20
11	Robotas Plunge	24	4	7	13	21	44	−23	15
12	FK Logika Šiauliai	24	4	2	18	32	57	−25	10
13	Sveikata Kybartai	24	4	1	19	16	69	−53	9
14	FK Sūduva Marijampolė	24	1	1	22	13	82	−69	3

Source: rsssf.com

== Lithuanian Cup ==
=== Final ===
1993-06-24

FK Žalgiris Vilnius	1 – 0	FK Sirijus Klaipėda
Zdančius 5'

Gintaras Stadium, Palanga
Attendance: 1,000
Referee: Birieta (LTU)

== National team ==
=== Senior team ===
Date	Venue	Opponents	Score	Comp	Lithuania scorers	Fixture
1993-02-20	Myyrmäki Indoor Hall; Vantaa	Latvia	2 - 1	IBC93	Mikalajūnas 69'; Suliauskas 74'	—
1993-02-21	Myyrmäki Indoor Hall; Vantaa	Finland	3 - 0	IBC93		—
1993-02-24	Estadio Ramón Sánchez Pizjuán; Sevilla	Spain	5 - 0	WCQ94		#109
1993-03-30	DAC Stadion; Dunajská Streda	Slovakia	2 - 2	F	Zdančius 40', 70'	#110
1993-03-31	Stadion Górnika Brzeszcze; Brzeszcze	Poland	1 - 1	F	Poderis 41'	#111
1993-04-14	Žalgiris Stadium; Vilnius	Albania	3 - 1	WCQ94	Baltušnikas 20'; Sukristov 25'; Baranauskas 53'	#112
1993-05-18	Žalgiris Stadium; Vilnius	Ukraine	1 - 2	F	Zdančius 4'	#113
1993-05-25	Žalgiris Stadium; Vilnius	Northern Ireland	0 - 1	WCQ94		#114
1993-06-02	Žalgiris Stadium; Vilnius	Spain	0 - 2	WCQ94		#115
1993-06-16	Žalgiris Stadium; Vilnius	Republic of Ireland	0 - 1	WCQ94		#116
1993-07-03	Kalevi Stadium; Pärnu	Latvia	0 - 0	BC93		#117
1993-07-04	Kalevi Stadium; Pärnu	Estonia	2 - 1	BC93	Olsanskis 60'	#118
1993-08-25	Parken Stadium; Copenhagen	Denmark	4 - 0	WCQ94		#119
1993-09-08	Lansdowne Road; Dublin	Republic of Ireland	2 - 0	WCQ94		#120
