= Aidas Preikšaitis =

Lithuanian footballer

Personal information
- Date of birth: 15 July 1970 (age 56)
- Place of birth: Akmenė, Lithuanian SSR
- Height: 1.81 m (5 ft 11 in)
- Position: Midfielder

Senior career*
Years	Team	Apps	(Gls)
1989–1996	Žalgiris	124	(35)
1997	Torpedo-Luzhniki Moscow	16	(2)
1997	KAMAZ Naberezhnye Chelny	6	(0)
1997–1998	GKS Katowice	11	(0)
1998–1999	Stomil Olsztyn	39	(5)
1999–2000	Union Berlin	24	(1)
2000	KSZO Ostrowiec	0	(0)
2001	Žalgiris	8	(1)
2001–2002	Kickers Emden	17	(4)
2002–2003	Wisła Płock	22	(0)
2003–2004	Świt Nowy Dwór	12	(1)
2004–2006	Vėtra	75	(9)
Total		354	(58)

International career
1992–2006	Lithuania	48	(3)
- * Club domestic league appearances and goals

Aidas Preikšaitis (born 15 July 1970) is a Lithuanian former professional footballer who played as a midfielder.

== Club career ==
Preikšaitis was born in Akmenė. He represented Žalgiris from 1989 to 1997. His former teams include 1. FC Union Berlin, Kickers Emden, KSZO Ostrowiec Świętokrzyski, Wisła Płock and Świt Nowy Dwór Mazowiecki.

He played 6 games and scored 1 goal in the UEFA Intertoto Cup 1997 for Torpedo-Luzhniki Moscow.

== International career ==
Preikšaitis made 48 appearances for the Lithuania national football team from 1992 to 2006.

== Honours ==
Žalgiris

- A Lyga: 1991, 1991–92
- Lithuanian Cup: 1991, 1992–93, 1993–94

Lithuania

- Baltic Cup: 1992
