= Raimondas Žutautas =

Lithuanian footballer and coach

Personal information
- Full name: Raimondas Žutautas
- Date of birth: 4 September 1972 (age 54)
- Place of birth: Klaipėda, Lithuanian SSR, Soviet Union
- Position: Defensive midfielder

Senior career*
Years	Team	Apps	(Gls)
1992–1994	ROMAR Mažeikiai	38	(3)
1994	FK Banga Gargždai	10	(6)
1995	Atlantas Klaipeda	7	(2)
1995–1996	Inkaras Kaunas	26	(6)
1996–1999	Alania Vladikavkaz	71	(2)
1999–2003	Maccabi Haifa	86	(6)
2003–2005	Panathinaikos	21	(2)
Total		259	(27)

International career^{‡}
1995–2004	Lithuania	40	(1)

Managerial career
- 2010–2011: Lithuania
- 2018: Hapoel Kfar Saba
- * Club domestic league appearances and goals as of 10 February 2010 ‡ National team caps and goals as of 10 February 2010

Raimondas Žutautas (born 4 September 1972) is a former Lithuanian footballer and current head coach. Zutautas played as a defensive midfielder.

In 1999 Zutautas signed with Israeli club Maccabi Haifa F.C. and played there between the years 1999–2003. He won two championships with Maccabi Haifa and qualified to the UEFA Champions League group stage. Zutautas is considered one of the best defensive midfielders to ever play in the Israeli Premier League.

Zutautas is the only Lithuanian player to score two goals in the UEFA Champions League. In 2002, while playing for Maccabi Haifa, he scored against Manchester United. His second goal was scored a year later against Rangers while playing for Panathinaikos.

== Managerial career ==
On 9 February 2010, Žutautas was appointed as the new manager of Lithuania. He is also Lithuania's youngest ever national coach at the age of 37.

== Honours ==
- A Lyga: champion (2)
  - 1993–94, 1995–96
- Israeli Premier League: champion (2)
  - 2000–01, 2001–02
- Greek Championship: champion (1)
  - 2003–04
- Greek Cup: winner (1)
  - 2003–04
