= 1992 in Lithuanian football =

- A Lyga champions
- FK Žalgiris Vilnius
- 1 Lyga champions
- Žalgiris-2 Vilnius
- Lithuanian Cup winners
- Lietuvos Makabi Vilnius
- Lithuanian national team
- 1992 Baltic Cup; 1994 FIFA World Cup qualification
- Lithuanian Footballer of the Year
- Valdemaras Martinkenas

The 1992 season was the second season of competitive football (soccer) in Lithuania as an independent nation since regaining independence from the Soviet Union in 1990.

In the Premier League, named A Lyga, fourteen teams competed, with FK Žalgiris Vilnius winning the title. Lietuvos Makabi Vilnius won that season's domestic cup.

== National Leagues ==
=== A Lyga ===
Pos	Team	Pld	W	D	L	GF	GA	GD	Pts	Qualification or relegation
1	Žalgiris (C)	25	17	5	3	39	11	+28	39	Qualification to Champions League first round
2	Panerys	25	16	6	3	47	10	+37	38	
3	Sirijus	25	11	11	3	32	14	+18	33	
4	Banga Kaunas	25	11	10	4	26	15	+11	32	
5	Ekranas	25	12	8	5	45	21	+24	32	
6	Lietuvos Makabi	25	10	11	4	31	18	+13	31	
7	Granitas Klaipėda	25	11	8	6	37	23	+14	30	
8	Sakalas	25	7	9	9	26	31	−5	23	
9	Mažeikiai	25	8	5	12	23	32	−9	21	
10	Inkaras	25	6	6	13	23	38	−15	18	
11	Snaigė	25	6	5	14	17	47	−30	17	
12	Elektronas	25	3	6	16	10	42	−32	12	
13	Tauras Šiauliai (R)	25	3	1	21	14	49	−35	7	Relegation to 1 Lyga
14	Vienybė (R)	13	1	3	9	8	27	−19	5	Withdrawn and relegation to lower league

Source: rsssf.com
(C) Champions; (R) Relegated

=== I Lyga ===
Pos	Team	Pld	W	D	L	GF	GA	GD	Pts
1	FK Žalgiris-2 Vilnius	28	25	2	1	99	13	+86	52
2	Minija Kretinga	28	16	6	6	47	24	+23	38
3	FK Makabi-2 Vilnius	28	15	6	7	43	31	+12	36
4	Robotas Plunge	28	12	10	6	35	19	+16	34
5	FK Nevėžis	28	14	6	8	45	33	+12	34
6	FK Banga Gargždai	28	14	4	10	34	26	+8	32
7	Mastis Telsiai	28	14	4	10	44	38	+6	32
8	Vytis Kaunas	28	11	4	13	44	51	−7	26
9	Inter Snieckus	28	9	7	12	26	43	−17	25
10	SM Vilnius	28	10	4	14	31	30	+1	24
11	FK Sūduva Marijampolė	28	7	6	15	24	45	−21	20
12	FK Sveikata Kybartai	28	7	6	15	25	50	−25	20
13	FK Olimpija Panevėžys	28	7	6	15	22	51	−29	20
14	FK Sirijus-2 Klaipėda	28	6	2	20	21	59	−38	14
15	FK Politechnika Kaunas	28	4	5	19	13	40	−27	13

Source: rsssf.com

== Lithuanian Cup ==
=== Final ===
1992-06-24

Lietuvos Makabi Vilnius	1 – 0	FC Žalgiris Vilnius
Belousas 84' (pk)

Vingis Park, Vilnius
Attendance: 800
Referee: Dubinskas (LTU)

== National team ==
=== Senior team ===
Date	Venue	Opponents	Score	Comp	Lithuania scorers	Fixture
1992-03-25	Stadion Sportowy; Rydultowy	Poland	2- 0	F		—
1992-04-14	Prater Stadium; Vienna	Austria	4- 0	F		—
1992-04-28	Windsor Park; Belfast	Northern Ireland	2 - 2	WCQ94	Narbekovas 41'; Fridrikas 48'	—
1992-05-20	Zimbru Stadium; Chişinău	Moldova	1 - 1	F	Ramelis 78'	—
1992-06-03	Qemal Stafa; Tirana	Albania	1 - 0	WCQ94		—
1992-07-11	Daugava Stadium; Liepāja	Estonia	1 - 1	BC92	Šlekys 27'	—
1992-07-12	Daugava Stadium; Liepāja	Latvia	2 - 3	BC92	Baltušnikas 28', 31', 79'	—
1992-07-20	Žalgiris Stadium; Vilnius	Belarus	1 - 1	F	Baltušnikas 26'	—
1992-08-12	Daugava Stadium; Riga	Latvia	1 - 2	WCQ94	Poderis 66'; Tereškinas 85'	—
1992-09-02	S. Darius and S. Girėnas; Vilnius	Georgia	1 - 0	F	Mika 90'	—
1992-09-23	Žalgiris Stadium; Vilnius	Denmark	0 - 0	WCQ94		—
1992-10-14	Žalgiris Stadium; Vilnius	Slovakia	0 - 1	F		—
1992-10-28	Žalgiris Stadium; Vilnius	Latvia	1 - 1	WCQ94	Fridrikas 83'	—
