= Nikolai Krestobintsev =

Russian footballer

Personal information
- Full name: Nikolai Petrovich Krestobintsev
- Date of birth: 22 June 1970 (age 56)
- Height: 1.80 m (5 ft 11 in)
- Positions: Defender; midfielder

Youth career
- SDYuSShOR-4 Volzhsky

Senior career*
Years	Team	Apps	(Gls)
1988	FC MTsOP-Volgogradets Volgograd		
1989	FC Torpedo Volzhsky	4	(0)
1990	FC Progress Chernyakhovsk (amateur)		
1991–1992	FC Iskra Smolensk	70	(2)
1993–1995	FC Asmaral Moscow	60	(1)
1993–1995	→ FC Asmaral-d Moscow (loans)	9	(2)
1996	FC Lada Dimitrovgrad	22	(0)
1997	FC Torpedo Volzhsky	11	(0)
- * Club domestic league appearances and goals

Nikolai Petrovich Krestobintsev (Russian: Николай Петрович Крестобинцев; born 22 June 1970) is a former Russian football player.

Krestobintsev played in the Russian Top League with FC Asmaral Moscow.
