= 1990 Baltic League =

International football competition

Baltic League
- Season: 1990
- Champions: Žalgiris Vilnius
- Lithuanian Championship: Žalgiris Vilnius; Sirijus Klaipėda; Ekranas Panevėžys; Jovaras Mažeikiai
- Top goalscorer: V. Baranauskas (Sakalas Šiauliai); 18 goals

1990 Baltic League (Russian: Чемпионат Прибалтики по футболу 1990) was an international football competition organized in 1990 between three Baltic states with the ongoing dissolution of the Soviet Union. The league consisting of 18 clubs from the Lithuania SSR, Estonian SSR, the Latvian SSR and a special invitee FC Progress Cherniakhovsk from Kaliningrad Oblast. For Lithuanian teams the league also served as a preliminary (first stage) tournament for the first post-Soviet Lithuanian football championship.

With the ongoing revolutions of 1989, in 1990 the Baltic republics declared reinstatement of their independence and exit out of the Soviet Union. Lithuania declared its independence on March 11, on March 30 the Estonian Soviet Socialist Republic announced that its existence is not legal by recognizing itself as a territory under the Soviet occupation since 1940, Latvia simply repeated the feat of Lithuania on May 4.

The Lithuanian club Žalgiris, a member of the Soviet Top League after losing its first game in Odesa 0–1 to Chornomorets Odesa, withdrew from the 1990 Soviet Top League and joined the Baltic League. The club that in previous season qualified for the 1990–91 UEFA Cup was denied entrance to the European competitions.

== History ==
The four best Lithuanian teams from Baltic League and the 1 Lyga qualified for the National Championship play-off. Also all Lithuanian clubs from the Baltic League qualified for the next season of A Lyga. Most of Latvian clubs also joined the championship of Latvia (Latvian SSR), while some continued their participation in the Soviet championship. The Soviet Estonian clubs after the fall of the Soviet Union were dissolved, while Progress Chernyakhovsk continued to participate in lower leagues of the Russian championship.

Note that Pardaugava also this season competed in the 1990 Soviet Second League (as Daugava Riga), while Zalgiris just pulled out of the Soviet competitions after playing the first game of the 1990 Soviet Top League, losing it away in Odessa. Also both Chernyakovsk and Yelgava clubs competed in the 1990 Soviet Second League B, Zone 6.

== Teams ==
=== All-Union competition ===
| Team/Club | 1990 season's tournament |
|---|---|
| Žalgiris Vilnius | Soviet Top League, 4th place |
| Sport Tallinn | Soviet Second League, 20th place |
| Inkaras Kaunas | Soviet Second League, 22nd place |

=== Football championship of the Lithuanian SSR ===
| Team/Club | Place |
|---|---|
| Banga Kaunas | 1st place |
| Ekranas Panevezys | 2nd place |
| Sirijus Klaipeda | 3rd place |
| Jovaras Mazeikiaj | 6th place |
| Sakalas Siauliaj | 10th place |
| Neris Vilnius | 13th place |
| Suduva Marijampole | 14th place |

=== Football championship of the Latvian SSR ===
| Team/Club | Place |
|---|---|
| RAF Jelgava | 1st place |
| Torpedo Riga | 2nd place |
| Stroitel Daugavpils | 3rd place |
| Daugava-LGIFK Riga | 4th place |
| Metalurgs Liepaja | 7th place |
| Pardaugava-RShVSM Riga | students |

Notes:

- RAF Jelgava was the second team of RAF Jelgava that was playing in the 1990 Soviet Second League B (Group 6).
- Daugava-LGIFK Riga was a reserve team of FC Daugava Riga that played in the 1990 Soviet First League. LGIFK stands for the Latvian State Institute of Physical Culture.
- RShVSM stands for the Republican School of Higher Sports Mastery.

=== Football championship of the Estonian SSR ===
| Team/Club | Place |
|---|---|
| Fosforit Tallinn | 1st place |

Notes:

- Last season Fosforit Tallinn was known as Zvezda Tallinn representing the Soviet Army sports club

=== Football championship of the Russian SFSR (among KFK) ===
| Team/Club | Place |
|---|---|
| Progress Cherniakhovsk | |

=== Withdrew ===
- Atlantas Klaipeda Soviet Second League, 8th place

== Baltic League ==
| Pos | Team | Pld | W | D | L | GF | GA | GD | Pts | Qualification |
|---|---|---|---|---|---|---|---|---|---|---|
| 1 | (Lithuanian Soviet Socialist Republic) Žalgiris Vilnius | 32 | 27 | 4 | 1 | 104 | 11 | +93 | 58 | Qualification to Lithuanian championship play-off and founding of A Lyga |
| 2 | (Lithuanian Soviet Socialist Republic) Sirijus Klaipėda | 32 | 19 | 9 | 4 | 47 | 19 | +28 | 47 | Qualification to Lithuanian championship play-off and founding of A Lyga |
| 3 | (Lithuanian Soviet Socialist Republic) Ekranas Panevėžys | 32 | 19 | 8 | 5 | 62 | 24 | +38 | 46 | Qualification to Lithuanian championship play-off and founding of A Lyga |
| 4 | (Russian Soviet Federative Socialist Republic) Progress Cherniakhovsk | 32 | 19 | 4 | 9 | 46 | 33 | +13 | 42 | Moved to the Soviet Second League B |
| 5 | (Lithuanian Soviet Socialist Republic) Jovaras Mažeikiai | 32 | 16 | 8 | 8 | 40 | 25 | +15 | 40 | Qualification to Lithuanian championship play-off and founding of A Lyga |
| 6 | (Lithuanian Soviet Socialist Republic) Inkaras Kaunas | 32 | 15 | 9 | 8 | 54 | 25 | +29 | 39 | The A Lyga founding teams |
| 7 | (Lithuanian Soviet Socialist Republic) Banga Kaunas | 32 | 13 | 11 | 8 | 45 | 30 | +15 | 37 | The A Lyga founding teams |
| 8 | (Latvian Soviet Socialist Republic) RAF Jelgava | 32 | 13 | 10 | 9 | 44 | 37 | +7 | 36 | Relegation to regional competitions |
| 9 | (Lithuanian Soviet Socialist Republic) Sakalas Šiauliai | 32 | 11 | 12 | 9 | 41 | 32 | +9 | 34 | The A Lyga founding teams |
| 10 | (Estonian Soviet Socialist Republic) Sport Tallinn | 32 | 11 | 11 | 10 | 43 | 39 | +4 | 33 | Defunct after end of season |
| 11 | (Lithuanian Soviet Socialist Republic) Neris Vilnius | 32 | 10 | 8 | 14 | 27 | 47 | −20 | 28 | The A Lyga founding teams |
| 12 | (Latvian Soviet Socialist Republic) Celtnieks Daugavpils | 32 | 8 | 7 | 17 | 29 | 45 | −16 | 23 | Relegation to the Latvian SSR Higher League |
| 13 | (Latvian Soviet Socialist Republic) Torpedo Rīga | 32 | 6 | 10 | 16 | 29 | 49 | −20 | 22 | Relegation to the Latvian SSR Higher League |
| 14 | (Latvian Soviet Socialist Republic) KKI Daugava Riga | 32 | 4 | 13 | 15 | 16 | 49 | −33 | 21 | Relegation to the Latvian SSR Higher League |
| 15 | (Latvian Soviet Socialist Republic) Pārdaugava Riga | 32 | 5 | 8 | 19 | 24 | 53 | −29 | 18 | Relegation to the Latvian SSR Higher League |
| 16 | (Latvian Soviet Socialist Republic) Metalurgs Liepāja | 32 | 4 | 5 | 23 | 20 | 97 | −77 | 13 | Relegation to the Latvian SSR Higher League |
| 17 | (Lithuanian Soviet Socialist Republic) FK Sūduva Marijampolė | 32 | 1 | 5 | 26 | 13 | 69 | −56 | 7 | The A Lyga founding teams |

Source: rsssf.com
- ASK Fosforit Tallinn quit the competition after 14 games

=== Top scorers ===
- 18 V.Baranauskas (Sakalas Šiauliai)
- 16 A.Narbekovas (Zalgiris Vilnius)
- 14 V.Ivanauskas (Zalgiris Vilnius)
- 14 K.Dranginis (Inkaras Kaunas)

== See also ==
- 1990 Estonian SSR Football Championship
- 1990 Latvian SSR Higher League
- 1990 Lithuanian Top League
