= 1989 Soviet Second League, Finals =

1989 Soviet Second League Finals were taken place when all competitions in each nine zones (groups) of the league. Winners of each zone proceeded to the finals and were split in three groups of three participants. The group winners would receive the actual promotion to the 1990 Soviet First League.

== Group 1 ==
Pos	Rep	Team	Pld	W	D	L	GF	GA	GD	Pts	Promotion
1	RUS	Lokomotiv Gorkiy	4	2	1	1	6	3	+3	5	Promoted
2	RUS	Irtysh Omsk	4	2	0	2	4	3	+1	4	
3	RUS	Cement Novorossiysk	4	1	1	2	4	8	−4	3	

== Group 2 ==
Pos	Rep	Team	Pld	W	D	L	GF	GA	GD	Pts	Promotion
1	MDA	Textilshchik Tiraspol	4	3	1	0	7	2	+5	7	Promoted
2	UKR	Volyn Lutsk	4	0	3	1	2	5	−3	3	
3	RUS	Krylya Sovetov Kuibyshev	4	0	2	2	4	6	−2	2	

== Group 3 ==
Pos	Rep	Team	Pld	W	D	L	GF	GA	GD	Pts	Promotion
1	GEO	Dinamo Sukhumi	4	3	0	1	5	1	+4	6	Promoted
2	UZB	Neftyanik Fergana	4	2	0	2	2	5	−3	4	
3	KAZ	Traktor Pavlodar	4	1	0	3	3	4	−1	2	

Source: rsssf.com

=== Top goalscorers ===
The following were the top ten goalscorers.

#	Scorer	Goals (Pen.)	Team

== See also ==
- Soviet Second League
