= Viktor Karman =

Russian footballer and manager (born 1962)

Personal information
- Full name: Viktor Vladimirovich Karman
- Date of birth: 8 December 1962 (age 63)
- Place of birth: Gvardeysk, Russian SFSR
- Height: 1.75 m (5 ft 9 in)

Senior career*
Years	Team	Apps	(Gls)
1980–1987	FC Baltika Kaliningrad	182	(21)
1987–1991	FC Progress Chernyakhovsk		
1991	FC Reftransflot Kaliningrad		
1991	Gwardia Szczytno		
1992–1993	FC Progress Chernyakhovsk	64	(23)
1994	FC Baltika-2 Kaliningrad	5	(0)
1994–1995	FC Gvardeyets Gvardeysk		
1996–1998	FC Olimpiya Gvardeysk		

Managerial career
- 1988: FC Progress Chernyakhovsk
- 1989: FC Progress Chernyakhovsk (assistant)
- 1990: FC Progress Chernyakhovsk
- 1991–1993: FC Progress Chernyakhovsk (assistant)
- 1994: FC Progress Chernyakhovsk (assistant)
- 1994: FC Baltika-2 Kaliningrad (assistant)
- 1995–1998: FC Olimpiya Gvardeysk (assistant)
- 1999: FC Baltika Kaliningrad (assistant)
- 2000–2001: FC Baltika Kaliningrad
- 2001–2003: FC Baltika Kaliningrad (assistant)
- 2003–2004: FC Baltika-Tarko Kaliningrad
- * Club domestic league appearances and goals

Viktor Vladimirovich Karman (Russian: Виктор Владимирович Карман; born 8 December 1962 in Gvardeysk) is a Russian football coach and a former player.

Karman managed FC Baltika Kaliningrad in the Russian First Division.
