= 1994–95 A Lyga =

Fifth season of top-tier football in Lithuania

A Lyga
- Season: 1994–95
- Champions: Inkaras-Grifas Kaunas
- Relegated: FK Interas
- UEFA Cup: Inkaras-Grifas Kaunas
- UEFA Cup Winner's Cup: FK Zalgiris
- UEFA Intertoto Cup: FK Panerys Vilnius

The Lithuanian A Lyga 1994–95 was the fifth season of top-tier football in Lithuania. The season started on 23 July 1994 and ended on 19 June 1995 with a championship playoff match. It was contested by 12 teams, and Inkaras-Grifas Kaunas won the championship.

== Final table ==
Pos	Team	Pld	W	D	L	GF	GA	GD	Pts	Qualification or relegation
1	Inkaras-Grifas (C)	22	16	4	2	50	12	+38	36	Qualification to UEFA Cup preliminary round (Note: The title was decided in a championship playoff as Inkaras-Grifas and Žalgiris finished with equal points.)
2	Žalgiris	22	17	2	3	61	14	+47	36	Qualification to Cup Winners' Cup qualifying round
3	ROMAR (R)	22	15	4	3	51	14	+37	34	Defunct after end of season
4	Panerys	22	11	6	5	35	25	+10	28	Qualification for Intertoto Cup group stage
5	Aras	22	13	1	8	41	28	+13	27	
6	FBK Kaunas	22	8	8	6	25	22	+3	24	
7	Sakalas	22	9	4	9	37	23	+14	22	
8	Ekranas	22	7	8	7	21	18	+3	22	
9	Banga	22	3	6	13	19	56	−37	12	
10	Ukmergė	22	3	5	14	12	58	−46	11	
11	Sirijus	22	2	3	17	12	39	−27	7	
12	Interas-AE (R)	22	1	3	18	8	63	−55	5	Relegation to 1 Lyga

Source: RSSSF.com
(C) Champions; (R) Relegated

== Results ==
Home \ Away	ARA	BAN	EKR	FBK	INK	IAE	PAN	ROM	SAK	SIR	UKM	ŽAL
Aras		5–3	1–2	2–1	0–3	9–2	1–2	1–0	2–0	2–1	3–0	2–3
Banga	1–6		0–0	1–1	0–3	0–0	1–1	0–2	1–2	2–2	1–1	0–2
Ekranas	1–2	1–0		0–0	0–1	2–0	0–2	0–1	0–0	4–0	3–0	0–0
FBK Kaunas	0–1	3–1	1–1		1–0	4–1	0–0	2–2	0–2	2–1	0–0	1–0
Inkaras-Grifas	1–0	5–1	2–0	3–2		8–0	2–2	2–1	3–1	3–0	2–0	0–2
Interas-AE	0–1	1–2	0–0	0–3	0–3		0–2	0–5	1–0	0–1	1–1	0–3
Panerys	2–0	6–0	1–1	0–0	2–3	2–1		1–3	1–0	2–0	5–0	0–6
ROMAR	3–0	4–0	0–0	2–0	0–0	6–0	1–0		4–3	2–0	5–0	5–2
Sakalas	0–1	5–1	2–0	0–0	0–0	5–1	0–1	0–1		2–1	3–0	1–0
Sirijus	0–2	0–1	1–2	0–2	0–1	2–0	0–0	0–4	0–0		0–1	2–4
Ukmergė	0–0	2–3	1–3	0–2	0–5	1–0	2–3	0–0	1–9	2–1		0–5
Žalgiris	3–0	4–0	3–1	5–0	0–0	3–0	4–0	3–0	4–2	1–0	4–0	

Legend: Blue = home team win; Yellow = draw; Red = away team win.

== Championship play-off ==
19 June 1995

FK Žalgiris Vilnius	0 – 2	Inkaras-Grifas Kaunas
		Maciulevičius 31', 55'

Panevėžys
