= 1990 Lithuanian Top League =

A Lyga
- Season: 1990
- Champions: Panerys Vilnius (league); Sirijus Klaipėda (playoffs)

The Lithuanian A Lyga 1990 was the first season of top-tier football in Lithuania since it broke off from the Soviet Union.

The competition consisted of two stages: the first stage with double round robin tournaments (this league as well as Lithuanian teams of the 1990 Baltic League) and second stage championship title playoffs among the best Lithuanian teams from both leagues. The league competitions started on 7 April 1990 and ended on 9 October 1994. The championship title playoffs kicked off on 20 October with quarter-finals and ended with a final match on 4 November 1990.

== Final table ==
Pos	Team	Pld	W	D	L	GF	GA	GD	Pts	Qualification
1	Panerys Vilnius	30	20	6	4	48	18	+30	46	Qualification to Lithuanian championship play-off and qualification to the 1991 LFF Lyga
2	Granitas Klaipėda	30	20	6	4	57	16	+41	46	Qualification to Lithuanian championship play-off and qualification to the 1991 LFF Lyga
3	Sirijietis Klaipėda	30	14	9	7	38	27	+11	37	Qualification to Lithuanian championship play-off and qualification to the 1991 LFF Lyga
4	Elektronas Tauragė	30	15	6	9	35	29	+6	36	Qualification to Lithuanian championship play-off and qualification to the 1991 LFF Lyga
5	Vienybė Ukmergė	30	14	8	8	51	32	+19	36	Qualification to the 1991 LFF Lyga
6	Vilija Kaunas	30	14	7	9	64	39	+25	35	Qualification to the 1991 LFF Lyga
7	Atletas Kaunas	30	11	11	8	30	22	+8	33	
8	Tauras Šiauliai	30	13	6	11	53	41	+12	32	
9	Viltis Vilnius	30	10	10	10	50	32	+18	30	
10	Dainava Alytus	30	11	7	12	33	46	−13	29	
11	Nevėžis Kėdainiai	30	10	7	13	40	40	0	27	
12	Geležinis Vilkas	30	10	7	13	39	41	−2	27	
13	Politechnika Kaunas	30	8	6	16	27	56	−29	22	
14	Mastis Telšiai	30	5	10	15	28	55	−27	20	
15	Sveikata Kybartai	30	5	6	19	20	61	−41	16	
16	Širvinta Vilkaviskis	30	2	4	24	19	77	−58	8	

Source: rsssf.com

== Play-offs for the football champion title of Lithuania ==
Play-offs were organized between the Lithuanian clubs of all-Union Soviet professional competitions and competitions of the Lithuanian SSR.

- 1990 Baltic League qualifiers: 1. Žalgiris Vilnius, 2. Sirijus Klaipėda, 3. Ekranas Panevėžys, 5. Jovaras Mažeikiai

Team #1	Agg.	Team #1	1st leg	2nd leg
Quarterfinals
Elektronas Tauragė	0–9	Žalgiris Vilnius	0–6	0–3
Panerys Vilnius	2–1	Yovaras Mazeikiai	1–0	1–1
Granitas Klaipėda	1–3	Ekranas Panevėžys	1–1	0–2
Sirijietis Klaipėda	2–3	Sirijus Klaipėda	0–2	2–1
Semifinals
Ekranas Panevėžys	2–1	Žalgiris Vilnius	2–0	0–1
Panerys Vilnius	3–5	Sirijus Klaipėda	2–3	1–2
Third place
Žalgiris Vilnius	1–0	Panerys Vilnius		
Final
Sirijus Klaipėda	0–0	Ekranas Panevėžys	penalty kicks 3–2	

== See also ==
- 1990 in Lithuanian football
