= FK Sveikata Kybartai =

Lithuanian football club

FK Sveikata
- Full name: Futbolo klubas "Sveikata"
- Founded: 1919; 107 years ago
- Ground: Kybartai Stadium
- Capacity: 1,000
- Coordinates: 54°28′20″N 22°45′20″E
- Chairman: Nerijus Demenius
- Manager: Gabrielius Zagurskas
- League: II Lyga
- 2025: II Lyga, 3rd in A division
Home colours	Away colours	Third colours

Futbolo klubas Sveikata, commonly known as Sveikata, is a Lithuanian football club located in Kybartai, in Vilkaviškis District. They currently play in the II Lyga, the third tier of Lithuanian football. They are the oldest active football club in the country. In 2019 FK Sveikata became a member of the prestigious Club of Pioneers.

== History ==
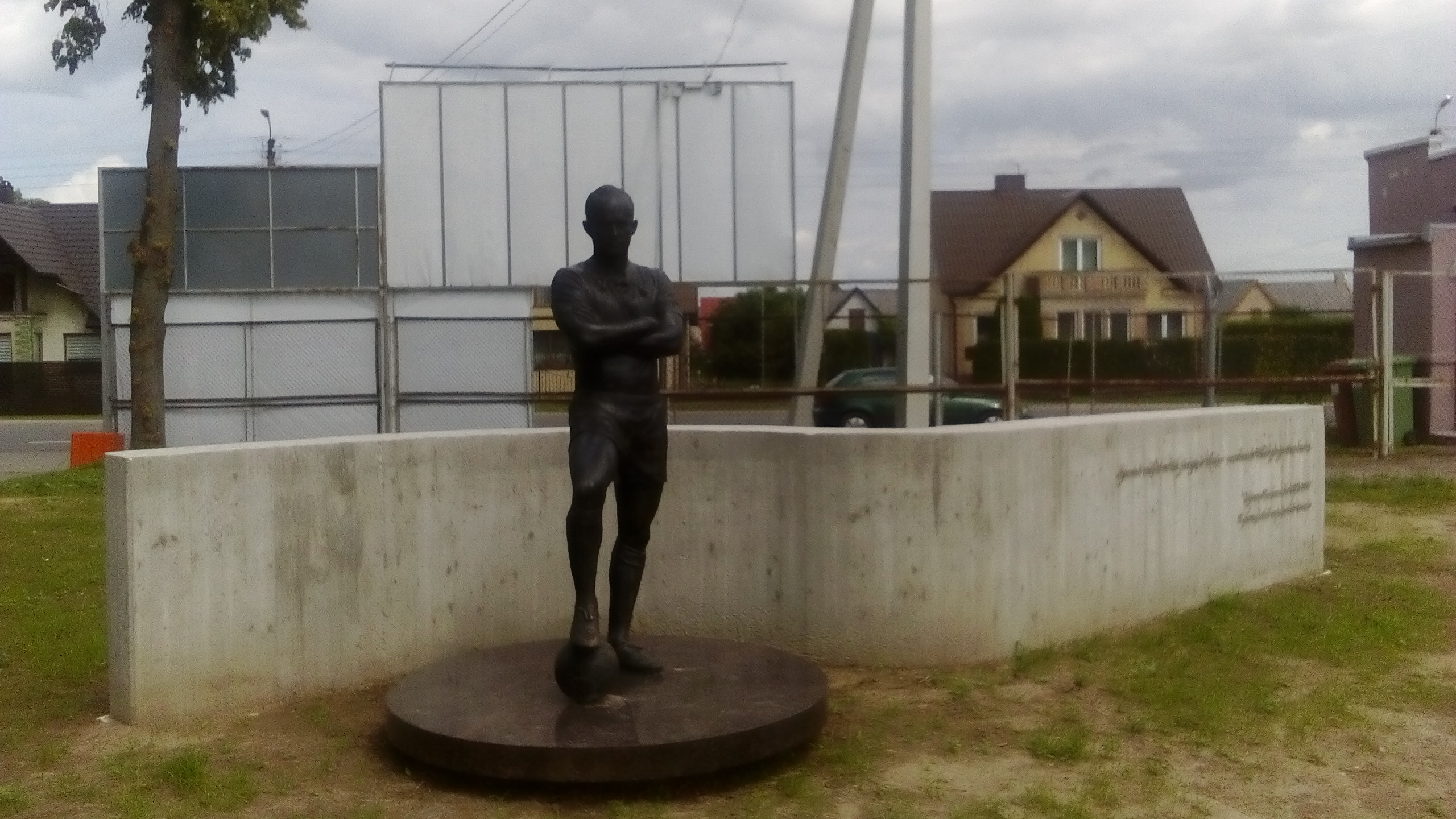
Statue of Vytautas Kochanauskas - iconic former Sveikata player-manager

The club was founded in as FK Banga Kybartai. The following year it was renamed and called FK Sveikata Kybartai.

In 1949, the club became a part of the republican sports union "Žalgiris". From 1952, the club was renamed GKS for sponsorship reasons.

During the Soviet occupation in Lithuania, the club was in the top division for a long time. Over the decades, it was both relegated and promoted back to the first tier more than once.

The 1990 season saw the club relegated to the First League and subsequently, in 1993, to the Second League.

Currently (2022), they play in II Lyga. In 2019, they had hope obtain a licence for Pirma lyga (2nd tier).

== Name ==
Sveikata in Lithuanian means health.

The club was named Sveikata for the first time in 1920. Following a series of name changes, it was renamed Sveikata in 1973.

=== Historical names ===
- 1919 – Banga
- 1920 – Sveikata
- 1949 – Žalgiris
- 1952 – GKS
- 1973 – Sveikata

== Honours ==
- The club's honours in soviet occupation period: played in "A" klasė (top division) or "B" klasė (second tier).
- In the period following Lithuanian independence (since 1990), Sveikata was in the first tier for one season, in the second tier for three seasons, and currently play in the third tier.
- Never champions of the country, Sveikata have twice been runners-up in the third tier, in 2000 and 2016.

=== Domestic ===
In recent seasons the team plays in the II Lyga Southern Zone championship.

(Lithuania) II Lyga Southern Zone

- Runners-up - 2: 2000, 2016

== Post Independence ==
Season	Level	Division	Position	Movements
1990	1.	Aukščiausioji lyga	15.	▼ Relegated
1991	2.	Pirma lyga	14.	
1991−1992	2.	Pirma lyga	12.	
1992−1993	2.	Pirma lyga	13.	▼ Relegated
1993−1994	3.	Antra lyga (Pietų zona)	4.	
1994−1995	3.	Antra lyga	10.	
1995−1996	3.	Antra lyga	7.	
1996−1997	3.	Antra lyga	14.	
1997−1998	3.	Antra lyga (Rytų zona)	11.	
1998−1999	3.	Antra lyga (Rytų zona)	8.	
1999	3.	Antra lyga (Pietų zona)	3.	
2000	3.	Antra lyga (Pietų zona)	2.	
2001	3.	Antra lyga (Pietų zona)	3.	
2002	3.	Antra lyga (Pietų zona)	6.	
2003	3.	Antra lyga (Pietų zona)	8.	
2004	3.	Antra lyga (Pietų zona)	5.	
2005	3.	Antra lyga (Pietų zona)	5.	
2006	3.	Antra lyga (Pietų zona)	3.	
2007	3.	Antra lyga (Pietų zona)	10.	
2008	3.	Antra lyga (Pietų zona)	9.	
2009	3.	Antra lyga (Pietų zona)	10.	
2010	3.	Antra lyga (Pietų zona)	8.	
2011	3.	Antra lyga (Pietų zona)	5.	
2012	3.	Antra lyga (Pietų zona)	10.	
2013	3.	Antra lyga (Pietų zona)	5.	
2014	3.	Antra lyga (Pietų zona)	7.	
2015	3.	Antra lyga (Pietų zona)	5.	
2016	3.	Antra lyga (Pietų zona)	2.	
2017	3.	Antra lyga (Pietų zona)	4.	
2018	3.	Antra lyga (Pietų zona)	3.	
2019	3.	Antra lyga (Pietų zona)	8.	
2020	3.	Antra lyga (Pietų zona)	3.	
2021	3.	Antra lyga	8.	
2022	3.	Antra lyga	14.	
2023	3.	Antra lyga	8.	
2024	3.	Antra lyga	5.	
2025	3.	Antra lyga (A divizionas)	3.	

== Kit evolution ==
1968	1973	1977	1994–1995	2002	2014	2018	2020

=== Colors ===
Blue and red.

Sveikata	Sveikata

== Stadium ==
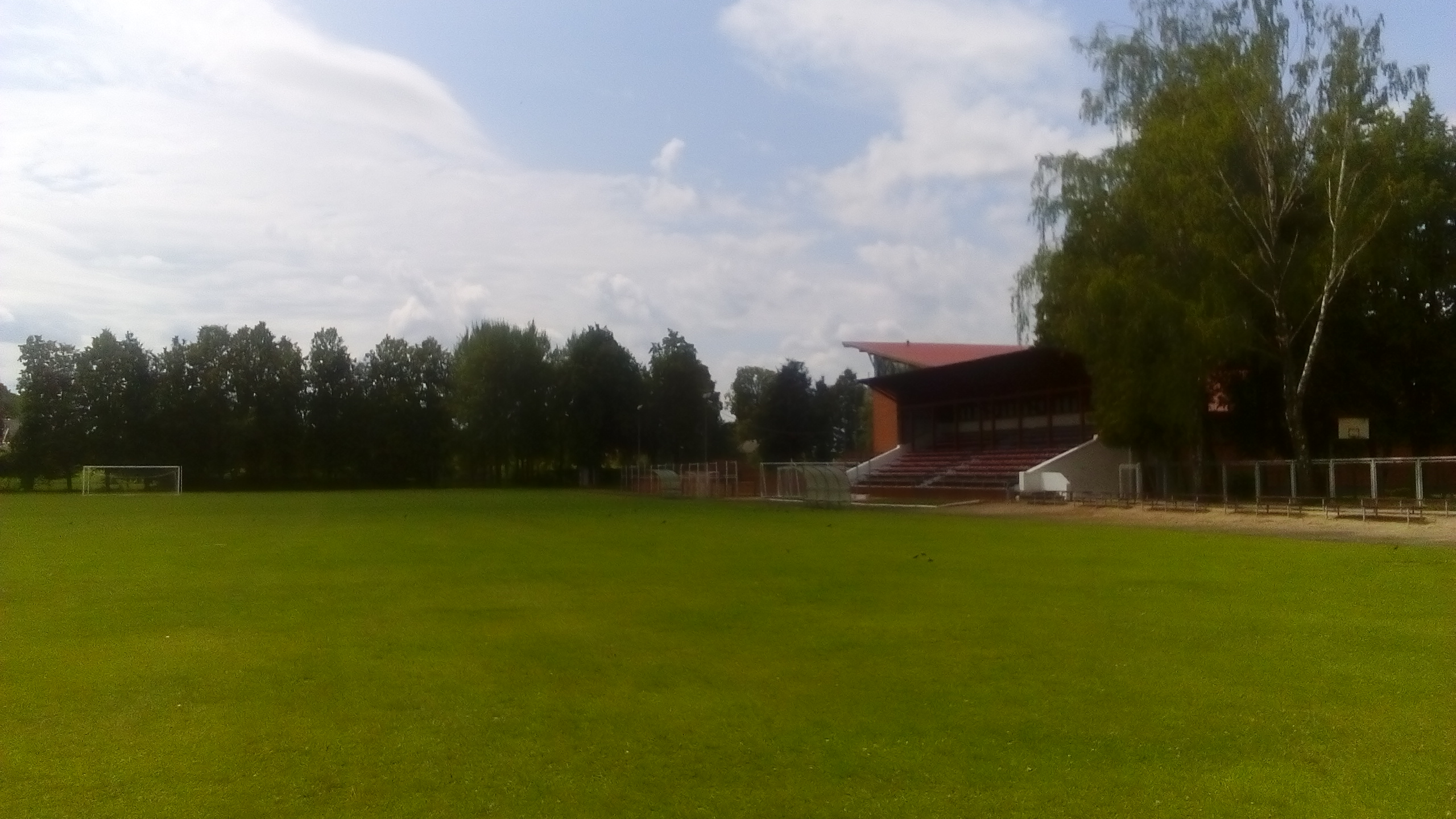
Kybartai Stadium before reconstruction.

Sveikata play their home matches in Kybartai Stadium. The current capacity of the stadium is 500 seats.

== Current squad ==
As of 7 August 2021

Note: Flags indicate national team as defined under FIFA eligibility rules; some limited exceptions apply. Players may hold more than one non-FIFA nationality.

No.	Pos.	Nation	Player
1	GK	LTU	Marius Mikelkevičius
1	GK	LTU	Vytenis Bujauskas
12	GK	LTU	Tautvydas Zavickas
4	DF	LTU	Ignas Siaurusaitis
13	DF	LTU	Vaidotas Norkeliūnas
2	DF	LTU	Mantas Kereiša
9	DF	LTU	Darius Kereiša (C)
6	DF	LTU	Arnas Simanavičius
8	MF	LTU	Gintaras Čibirka
7	MF	LTU	Deividas Karpavičius

No.	Pos.	Nation	Player
16	MF	LTU	Karolis Kereiša
3	MF	LTU	Rimvydas Melsbekas
10	MF	LTU	Edvinas Gliaubicas
17	MF	LTU	Edvinas Simanavičius
11	FW	LTU	Jaunius Mikalauskas
18	FW	LTU	Erikas Rūškys
14	FW	LTU	Artūras Pečiulis
20	FW	LTU	Aurimas Zdanavičius
21	FW	LTU	Matas Malinauskas
