= 1991–92 A Lyga =

A Lyga
- Season: 1991–92
- Champions: FK Žalgiris
- Relegated: Tauras Šiauliai; FK Vienybe
- UEFA Champions League: FK Zalgiris

The Lithuanian A Lyga 1991–92 was the second season of top-tier football in Lithuania. It was contested by 14 teams, and FK Žalgiris won the championship.

== Final table ==
Pos	Team	Pld	W	D	L	GF	GA	GD	Pts	Qualification or relegation
1	Žalgiris (C)	25	17	5	3	39	11	+28	39	Qualification to Champions League first round
2	Panerys	25	16	6	3	47	10	+37	38	
3	Sirijus	25	11	11	3	32	14	+18	33	
4	Banga Kaunas	25	11	10	4	26	15	+11	32	
5	Ekranas	25	12	8	5	45	21	+24	32	
6	Lietuvos Makabi	25	10	11	4	31	18	+13	31	
7	Granitas Klaipėda	25	11	8	6	37	23	+14	30	
8	Sakalas	25	7	9	9	26	31	−5	23	
9	Mažeikiai	25	8	5	12	23	32	−9	21	
10	Inkaras	25	6	6	13	23	38	−15	18	
11	Snaigė	25	6	5	14	17	47	−30	17	
12	Elektronas	25	3	6	16	10	42	−32	12	
13	Tauras Šiauliai (R)	25	3	1	21	14	49	−35	7	Relegation to 1 Lyga
14	Vienybė (R)	13	1	3	9	8	27	−19	5	Withdrawn and relegation to lower league

Source: rsssf.com
(C) Champions; (R) Relegated

== Results ==
Home \ Away	BAN	EKR	ELE	INK	GRA	LMA	MAŽ	PAN	SAK	SNA	SIR	TAU	VIE	ŽAL
Banga Kaunas		2–1	1–1	3–1	0–0	0–0	0–0	0–1	2–0	3–1	0–0	+:- (Note: The matches Banga Kaunas – Tauras Šiauliai and Snaigė – Tauras Šiauliai were each counted as a goalless victory for the home team.)		1–2
Ekranas	1–1		1–0	5–0	2–1	3–1	6–0	0–0	1–1	5–1	1–0	2–0	4–1	0–3
Elektronas	0–0	0–1		1–0	0–3	0–0	0–0	0–3	2–1	0–4	0–3	1–2	0–1	0–2
Inkaras	0–2	1–1	1–1		1–2	1–1	0–0	0–3	2–0	3–0	1–2	2–1	1–0	0–1
Granitas Klaipėda	1–1	2–1	2–0	1–0		0–0	0–3	2–1	3–0	1–2	0–0	3–0		1–1
Lietuvos Makabi	2–2	2–1	1–0	3–2	2–0		3–0	0–1	0–0	1–1	3–2	3–0	1–1	1–1
Jovaras	0–1	1–1	5–0	2–1	0–1	1–2		1–1	1–0	2–0	0–3	2–0		0–1
Panerys	3–0	0–0	1–0	3–0	4–0	1–0	1–0		4–1	8–0	1–1	2–0	4–0	0–2
Sakalas	0–2	1–1	1–0	2–2	0–0	1–0	2–0	2–1		0–0	1–1	1–0		0–1
Snaigė	0–2	1–1	0–1	0–1	0–8	0–4	2–0	1–1	2–1		0–1	+:-	2–1	0–1
Sirijus	0–0	2–1	1–1	2–0	0–0	0–0	4–0	0–0	2–2	1–0		1–0		2–0
Tauras Šiauliai	0–2	0–4	3–1	1–2	1–5	0–1	0–3	0–2	1–4	0–0	1–4		4–1	0–1
Vienybė	0–1				1–1		0–1		2–4		0–0			0–4
Žalgiris	1–0	0–1	5–1	1–1	3–0	0–0	3–1	0–1	1–1	1–0	2–0	2–0		

Legend: Blue = home team win; Yellow = draw; Red = away team win.

== See also ==
- 1992 in Lithuanian football
