= 1992–93 A Lyga =

A Lyga
- Season: 1992–93
- Champions: FK Ekranas
- Relegated: FK Neris Vilnius; FK Snaige; FK Minija Kretinga
- UEFA Champions League: FK Ekranas
- UEFA Cup Winner's Cup: FK Zalgiris

The Lithuanian A Lyga 1992–93 was the third season of top-tier football in Lithuania. It was contested by 15 teams, and FK Ekranas won the championship.

== Regular season ==
=== Standings ===
Pos	Team	Pld	W	D	L	GF	GA	GD	Pts	Qualification
1	Ekranas	13	10	2	1	27	3	+24	22	Qualification to championship round
2	Žalgiris	13	10	2	1	32	6	+26	22	Qualification to championship round
3	Panerys	13	10	1	2	34	14	+20	21	Qualification to championship round
4	Sirijus	13	7	4	2	20	7	+13	18	Qualification to championship round
5	Banga Kaunas	13	7	3	3	24	9	+15	17	Qualification to championship round
6	ROMAR	13	6	2	5	13	13	0	14	Qualification to championship round
7	Aras	13	4	5	4	16	13	+3	13	Qualification to championship round
8	Geležinis Vilkas	13	3	6	4	12	17	−5	12	Qualification to championship round
9	Inkaras	13	4	3	6	16	20	−4	11	Qualification to relegation round
10	Neris	13	3	3	7	15	20	−5	9	Qualification to relegation round
11	Snaigė	13	3	2	8	8	27	−19	8	Qualification to relegation round
12	Sakalas	13	2	2	9	8	23	−15	6	Qualification to relegation round
13	Tauras-Karšuva	13	2	2	9	6	26	−20	6	Qualification to relegation round
14	Minija	13	1	1	11	5	38	−33	3	Qualification to relegation round

Source: rsssf.com

=== Results ===
Home \ Away	ARA	BAN	EKR	GEL	INK	MIN	NER	PAN	ROM	SAK	SIR	SNA	TAU	ŽAL
Aras		0–1	0–3			3–0	0–1			3–0			1–0	0–0
Banga Kaunas			0–0		0–1			1–2		2–0	0–0	2–0		
Ekranas				0–1	2–0		3–0			2–0			3–0	1–0
Geležinis Vilkas	0–0	1–4			1–1	4–1	1–1			3–1				
Inkaras	2–2					3–0	3–1	1–6		3–0	0–1			
Minija		0–4	0–6					0–3	1–0			0–0		1–3
Neris		1–1				5–1		2–4	0–1		0–2	3–0		
Panerys	2–2		0–2	5–1					4–0			2–0	3–1	
ROMAR	0–0	0–2	1–1	1–0	3–0								1–0	1–2
Sakalas						2–0	1–1	0–1	1–2		1–1	0–1	2–0	
Sirijus	3–1		0–1	0–0		3–0		0–2	2–0			5–2		
Snaigė	1–4		1–3	0–0	1–0				0–3				2–1	0–4
Tauras-Karšuva		0–5		0–0	1–1	2–1	1–0				0–3			
Žalgiris		4–2		3–0	2–1		2–0	4–0		4–0	0–0		4–0	

Legend: Blue = home team win; Yellow = draw; Red = away team win.

== Championship round ==
=== Standings ===
Pos	Team	Pld	W	D	L	GF	GA	GD	Pts	Qualification
1	Ekranas (C)	27	20	6	1	50	8	+42	46	Qualification to Champions League preliminary round
2	Žalgiris	27	18	7	2	54	13	+41	43	Qualification to Cup Winners' Cup qualifying round
3	Panerys	27	16	4	7	53	29	+24	36	
4	Sirijus	27	11	9	7	36	29	+7	31	
5	Banga Kaunas	27	11	5	11	36	29	+7	27	
6	ROMAR	27	11	4	12	27	27	0	26	
7	Aras	27	8	8	11	26	33	−7	24	
8	Geležinis Vilkas	27	5	8	14	25	43	−18	18	

Source: rsssf.com
(C) Champions

=== Results ===
Home \ Away	ARA	BAN	EKR	GEL	PAN	ROM	SIR	ŽAL
Aras		2–1	0–2	1–2	2–1	1–1	0–2	0–0
Banga Kaunas	1–0		0–3	1–0	0–0	1–0	0–0	2–3
Ekranas	5–0	2–1		2–1	2–0	1–0	1–0	1–0
Geležinis Vilkas	1–2	2–1	1–1		0–2	0–1	1–1	1–2
Panerys	3–0	2–1	0–1	2–0		2–1	0–0	1–2
ROMAR	1–0	3–1	0–0	2–1	3–0		1–2	0–1
Sirijus	0–2	1–2	1–1	4–3	3–6	2–0		0–0
Žalgiris	0–0	2–0	1–1	4–0	0–0	2–1	5–0	

Legend: Blue = home team win; Yellow = draw; Red = away team win.

== Relegation round ==
=== Standings ===
Pos	Team	Pld	W	D	L	GF	GA	GD	Pts	Relegation
9	Inkaras	23	8	6	9	28	28	0	22	
10	Sakalas	23	9	3	11	23	30	−7	21	
11	Neris (R)	23	7	5	11	27	31	−4	19	Defunct in the next season
12	Tauras-Karšuva	23	6	6	11	14	33	−19	18	
13	Snaigė (R)	23	6	3	14	14	36	−22	15	Relegation to 1 Lyga
14	Minija (R)	23	2	4	17	12	56	−44	8	Relegation to 1 Lyga

Source: rsssf.com
(R) Relegated

=== Results ===
Home \ Away	INK	MIN	NER	SAK	SNA	TAU
Inkaras		4–0	2–0	0–1	1–0	0–2
Minija	2–2		1–3	1–2	+:- (Note: The match between Minija and Snaigė was counted as a goalless win for Minija.)	0–0
Neris	1–1	2–0		1–1	2–0	1–3
Sakalas	2–1	2–1	1–0		2–1	0–0
Snaigė	0–1	1–1	2–1	1–0		1–0
Tauras-Karšuva	0–0	2–1	0–0	0–4	1–0	

Legend: Blue = home team win; Yellow = draw; Red = away team win.

== See also ==
- 1992 in Lithuanian football
- 1993 in Lithuanian football
