= Mantas Fridrikas =

Lithuanian footballer

Personal information
- Date of birth: 13 September 1988 (age 38)
- Place of birth: Lithuania
- Height: 1.86 m (6 ft 1 in)
- Position: Centre back

Senior career*
Years	Team	Apps	(Gls)
2005–2006	Atletas Kaunas		
2007–2012	FBK Kaunas	68	(4)
2012	FC Fyn		
2012	FBK Kaunas	5	(0)
2013	Šiauliai	29	(0)
2014	Žalgiris Vilnius	3	(0)
2015	Utenis Utena	31	(1)
2016	Kauno Žalgiris	14	(0)
2017	DFK Dainava	24	(0)
2017–2018	Atlantas	24	(0)
2018–2019	Panevėžys	38	(1)
2020–2022	Hegelmann Litauen	80	(2)

International career
2007–2010	Lithuania U-21	13	(0)
2010	Lithuania	1	(0)
- * Club domestic league appearances and goals

Mantas Fridrikas (born 13 September 1988) is a retired Lithuanian footballer who played as a centre back.

== Career ==
Fridrikas made eight appearances and scored one goal for FBK Kaunas during the 2007 season.

Fridrikas was hoping to move to Scottish Premier League side Heart of Midlothian in January 2009.

Later plays for FC Fyn as a defender.

From 2017 he played in FK Atlantas Klaipėda.

From 2018 summer in FK Panevėžys.

== Personal life ==
Fridrikas' father Robertas and his half-brother Lukas are also professional footballers.
