= Robertas Fridrikas =

Lithuanian footballer

Personal information
- Full name: Robertas Fridrikas
- Date of birth: 8 April 1967 (age 59)
- Place of birth: Kaunas, Lithuanian SSR, Soviet Union
- Height: 1.83 m (6 ft 0 in)
- Position: Winger

Senior career*
Years	Team	Apps	(Gls)
1985–1989	FK Žalgiris Vilnius	52	(11)
1990	FC Guria Lanchkhuti	20	(11)
1990–1991	FC Lokomotiv Moscow	16	(1)
1991	FK Žalgiris Vilnius		
1991–1994	FK Austria Wien	51	(12)
1994–1995	WAF Procar		

International career
1990–1995	Lithuania	10	(2)
- * Club domestic league appearances and goals

Robertas Fridrikas (born 8 April 1967) is a Lithuanian former football forward.

Fridrikas was nicknamed Garrincha, after the famous Brazilian winger, since his one leg was shorter than the other just like Garrincha's.

== International career ==
He obtained ten caps for the Lithuania national football team, scoring two goals in 1992.

== Personal life ==
Fridrikas' wife, Ausra Fridrikas, was one of the best handballers of the 1990s. His two sons, Mantas and Lukas are also professional footballers. He remained in Austria after retirement, and now works in the tourism industry.

== Honours ==
- Austrian Football Bundesliga winner: 1991–92 1992–93
- Austrian Cup winner: 1991–92 1993–94

== International goals ==
#	Date	Venue	Opponent	Score	Result	Competition
1.	28 April 1992	Belfast	Northern Ireland	2–1	2–2	1994 FIFA World Cup qualification (UEFA)
2.	28 October 1992	Vilnius	Latvia	1–1	1–1	1994 FIFA World Cup qualification (UEFA)
