= Savages FC Pietermaritzburg =

Savages FC PMD
- Full name: Savages FC Pietermaritzburg
- Nickname: the savages
- Short name: Savages FC
- Founded: 1882; 144 years ago
- Chairman: Benjamin Hartshorne
- Website: facebook.com/savagespmb
Home colours

Savages FC PMD is a football club from Pietermaritzburg. Founded in 1882, the club is the oldest in South Africa, and one of the oldest in the continent of Africa.

== History ==
Savages FC PMD originates from an English football club of the same name. Founded in 1882 by English immigrants, they originally played in black jersey, pants and stockings.

The first prominent members included Governor-general of Natal Mr. Justice Beaumont.

One of the first games that Savages FC PMB played was on 29, 11 August September – 26 September 1882, against Hilton College and Ramblers FC. At the time, they still played under both rugby and association football rules.

In the summer of 2017, the club joined the prestigious Club of Pioneers in honor of the club's 135th anniversary.

== Honours ==
- Natal Province Challenge Cup: 1982, 1994
- Charity Cup: 1897
