= Alessandro Mascia =

Italian footballer (born 1986)

Personal information
- Date of birth: 6 August 1986 (age 40)
- Place of birth: Olbia, Italy
- Height: 1.77 m (5 ft 10 in)
- Position: Midfielder

Team information
- Current team: PSP Porto San Paolo

Senior career*
Years	Team	Apps	(Gls)
–2007	Olbia		
2007–2008	Torres	18	(1)
2008–2009	Calangianus		
2009–2010	Arzachena		
2010–2011	US San Teodoro		
2011–2012	Tauras	13	(4)
2012–2015	US San Teodoro		
2015–2021	Porto Rotondo		
2021–2025	SS Oschirese		
2025–	PSP Porto San Paolo		
- * Club domestic league appearances and goals

Alessandro Mascia (born 6 August 1986) is an Italian footballer who plays as a midfielder for PSP Porto San Paolo.

== Career ==
In 2007, Mascia signed for S.E.F. Torres 1903 in the professional Italian forth division, feeling like he was "touching the sky with my finger”. However, at the end of 2007/08, the club went bankrupt.

For 2012, he signed for FK Tauras Tauragė in the Lithuanian top flight from the Italian fifth division. Afterwards, Mascia said that football in Lithuania was "a completely different kind of football, physical and not tactical".

After playing for US San Teodoro, he received offers from the Italian fourth division but chose instead to play in the amateur seventh division.
