= Club of Pioneers =

Global network of association football clubs

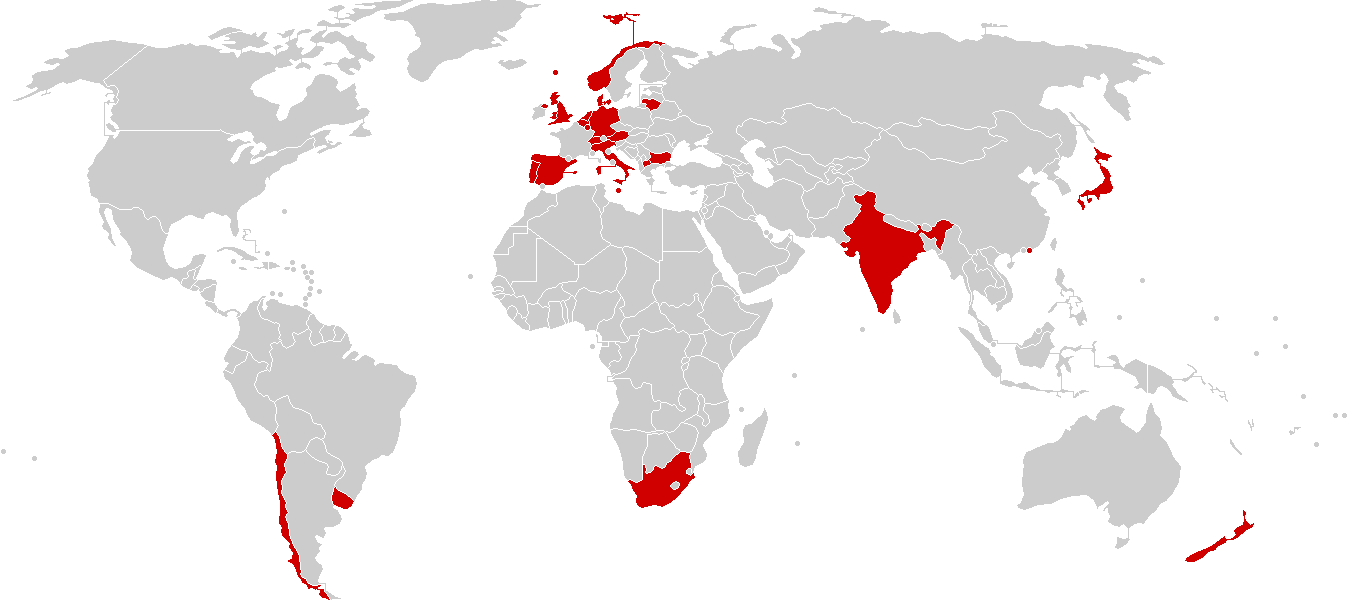
Countries of origin of member clubs, as of May 2024.

The Club of Pioneers is a global network that connects the oldest existing association football clubs from each country. The Club of Pioneers was founded in 2013 by Sheffield F.C., the first and oldest association football club in the world. The Club of Pioneers aims to discover and connect the world's oldest existing association football clubs, to build a global network of like-minded association football clubs to promote the importance of football history and the grass roots and amateur game.

== Definition of Pioneers ==
According to today's historical knowledge and available sources of football history, the Sheffield Football Club Foundation awards the honorary membership within the Club of Pioneers to those football clubs, who:

- Still play football in amateur or professional football competition today.
- Have constantly existed as a sports organisation since their date of foundation. (Exceptions for periods of inactivity due to external reasons, for example war.)
- Are by definition the oldest existing football club of their country, referring to the foundation date of a football team as part of a multi-sport club or as a proper football club, playing to association football rules.
- Live and support the values of the game and amateur football: Integrity, Respect, Community.

== Staff ==
The club’s staff includes coaches and administrators with experience in football.

| Office | Staff |
|---|---|
| President | (England) Richard Tims |
| Partnerships | (England) Dylan Ralph |
| Ambassador | (Belgium) Tom Simons |
| Ambassador | (Germany) Robert Zitzmann |
| Latam Ambassador | (Uruguay) (France) Juan Alvarez |

== Current members ==
As of 11 April 2026

| Club | Country | Founded | League | Tier | Continent |
|---|---|---|---|---|---|
| Sheffield F.C. | England | 24 October 1857; 169 years ago | Northern Counties East Football League Premier Division | 9 | Europe |
| Wrexham A.F.C. | Wales | 4 October 1864; 162 years ago | EFL Championship | 2 | Europe |
| Queen's Park F.C. | Scotland | 9 July 1867; 159 years ago | Scottish Championship | 2 | Europe |
| Kjøbenhavns Boldklub | Denmark | 24 October 1878; 148 years ago | DBU Copenhagen Serie 1 | 7 | Europe |
| FC St. Gallen | Switzerland | 19 April 1879; 147 years ago | Swiss Super League | 1 | Europe |
| Koninklijke HFC | Netherlands | 15 September 1879; 147 years ago | Tweede Divisie | 3 | Europe |
| Cliftonville F.C. | Northern Ireland | 20 September 1879; 147 years ago | NIFL Premiership | 1 | Europe |
| Royal Antwerp F.C. | Belgium | 1 January 1880; 146 years ago | Belgian Pro League | 1 | Europe |
| Savages FC Pietermaritzburg | South Africa | 1 January 1882; 144 years ago | Not applicable | n.a. | Africa |
| Balgownie Rangers FC | Australia | 16 June 1883; 143 years ago | Illawarra Premier League 2 | 5 | Oceania |
| Hong Kong F.C. | Hong Kong | 12 February 1886; 140 years ago | Hong Kong Premier League | 1 | Asia |
| Yokohama C.A.C. | Japan | 26 December 1886; 139 years ago | Not applicable | n.a. | Asia |
| North Shore United AFC | New Zealand | 1 January 1887; 139 years ago | NRFL Championship | 3 | Oceania |
| Académica de Coimbra | Portugal | 3 November 1887; 139 years ago | Liga 3 | 3 | Europe |
| Örgryte IS | Sweden | 4 December 1887; 138 years ago | Allsvenskan | 1 | Europe |
| BFC Germania 1888 | Germany | 15 April 1888; 138 years ago | Kreisliga B Berlin | 10 | Europe |
| Mohun Bagan Super Giant | India | 15 August 1889; 137 years ago | Indian Super League | 1 | Asia |
| Recreativo de Huelva | Spain | 18 December 1889; 136 years ago | Segunda Federación | 4 | Europe |
| St. George's F.C. | Malta | 1 January 1890; 136 years ago | Maltese National Amateur League II | 4 | Europe |
| Albion F.C. | Uruguay | 1 June 1891; 135 years ago | Liga AUF Uruguaya | 1 | South America |
| Tvøroyrar Bóltfelag | Faroe Islands | 13 May 1892; 134 years ago | 1. deild | 2 | Europe |
| Santiago Wanderers | Chile | 15 August 1892; 134 years ago | Campeonato Nacional Primera B | 2 | South America |
| Genoa CFC | Italy | 7 September 1893; 133 years ago | Serie A | 1 | Europe |
| Odds BK | Norway | 31 March 1894; 132 years ago | Norwegian First Division | 2 | Europe |
| First Vienna FC | Austria | 22 August 1894; 132 years ago | 2. Liga | 2 | Europe |
| CS Fola Esch | Luxembourg | 9 December 1906; 119 years ago | Luxembourg Division of Honour | 2 | Europe |
| Botev Plovdiv | Bulgaria | 11 March 1912; 114 years ago | First Professional Football League | 1 | Europe |
| FK Ljuboten | North Macedonia | 28 March 1919; 107 years ago | Macedonian Third Football League | 3 | Europe |
| FK Sveikata Kybartai | Lithuania | 8 June 1919; 107 years ago | II Lyga | 3 | Europe |
| S.V. Voorwaarts | Suriname | 1 August 1919; 107 years ago | Suriname Major League | 1 | South America |
| Al-Ittihad Club | Saudi Arabia | 26 December 1927; 98 years ago | Saudi Pro League | 1 | Asia |
| AC Libertas | San Marino | 4 September 1928; 98 years ago | Campionato Sammarinese | 1 | Europe |

== Pioneers Cup ==
Members of the Club of Pioneers, can also take part in a Pioneers Cup: a football tournament where only 'oldest' clubs can participate, to showcase their pioneering heritage. The teams themselves do not play, but are represented by 'Pioneer' teams of fans, former-players, and staff of the club.

2013 Pioneers Cup
| Date | 16 November 2013 |
| Venue | Sheffield F.C. Stadium - England |
| Participating teams | (England) Sheffield F.C. with Chris Waddle, Carlton Palmer, John Beresford (Spain) Recreativo de Huelva (Italy) Genoa CFC with Tomáš Skuhravý, Gennaro Ruotolo |
| Winners | (England) Sheffield F.C. |

2014 Pioneers Cup
| Date | 30 August 2014 |
| Venue | Haarlem - Netherlands |
| Participating teams | (England) Sheffield F.C. with Chris Dolby (Netherlands) Koninklijke HFC with Tom Van Schaick (Belgium) Royal Antwerp F.C. |
| Winners | (England) Sheffield F.C. |

2014 Pioneers Cup
| Date | 6 September 2014 |
| Venue | Estadio Nuevo Colombino - Huelva - Spain |
| Participating teams | (Spain) Recreativo de Huelva (Netherlands) Koninklijke HFC (Italy) Genoa CFC |
| Winners | (Spain) Recreativo de Huelva |

2016 Pioneers Cup
| Date | 21 May 2016 |
| Venue | Bosuilstadion - Antwerp - Belgium |
| Participating teams | (Belgium) Royal Antwerp F.C. with Jonas De Roeck (Netherlands) Koninklijke HFC with Tom Van Schaik, Paulo Meijnderhagen (Luxembourg) CS Fola Esch with Pascal Welter |
| Winners | (Netherlands) Koninklijke HFC |
| Notes | Pioneers Cup Ambassador: László Fazekas |

2019 Pioneers Cup
| Date | 31 August 2019 |
| Venue | Haarlem - Netherlands |
| Participating teams | (Lithuania) FK Sveikata Kybartai with Gintaras Cibirka, Audrius Paškevičius (Netherlands) Koninklijke HFC (Belgium) Royal Antwerp F.C. |
| Winners | (Lithuania) FK Sveikata Kybartai |

2024 Pioneers Cup
| Date | 7 September 2024 |
| Venue | Haarlem - Netherlands |
| Participating teams | (Lithuania) FK Sveikata Kybartai (Netherlands) Koninklijke HFC (Belgium) Royal Antwerp F.C. |
| Winners | (Lithuania) FK Sveikata Kybartai |

== Sources ==
- Sheffield F.C. - the world's first.
- Cliftonville F.C. : Introduction to the Club of Pioneers, 10 March 2013
- Genoa C.F.C.
- F.C. St. Gallen
- Royal Antwerp F.C. - Club of Pioneers
- Globalise then localize Game of the People, 27 juli 2013
- Sheffield Pioneers Cup BBC.com, 17 November 2013
- El Recreativo de Huelva ingresa con honores en el “Club of Pioneers”, Cihefe.es, 5 May 2013
- Entra en el ‘Club of Pioneers’ HuelvaYa.es, 5 May 2013
- KHFC new member for the Club of Pioneers TheStar.co.uk 5 September 2014
- St-Gallen aufnahme in Club of Pioneers Blick.ch, 23 September 2015
- FC St-Gallen kommt inden Club of Pioneers Tagblatt, 22 August 2014
- Antwerp Pioneers Cup GvA, 18 May 2016
- Antwerp treedt toe tot Club of Pioneers GvA, 23 May 2016
- Fola Esch, entering Club of Pioneers FuPa Lux, 14 November 2016
- Fola fir 110. Anniversaire am "Club of Pioneers" opgeholl RTL.lu, 13 December 2016
- Odds Ballklubb celebrated their place in "Club of Pioneers" at halftime in their match against Strømsgodset 13 May 2017
- Odds BK - Club of Pioneers
- Vi ønsker at folk skal kjenne til Odd når de snakker om fotball i Norge Vardens, 15 May 2017
- Classic Football Shirts, 19 July 2017
- Savages celebrate in style The Witness, 21 August 2017
- Academica integrase no Club of Pioneers Académica-oaf.pt, 4 November 2017
- Academica integrase no Club of Pioneers DSport.pt, 6 November 2017
- First Vienna FC neue mitglieder ,21 April 2018
- KB i eksklusivt selskab (in Danish) "Club website", 5 November 2018.
- ljuboten-enters-club-of-pioneers "Ljuboten enters Club of Pioneers" ,11 May 2019
- Ceremonia de ingreso Club of Pioneer "Corporation Wanderers", 24 August 2019
- Invitation for Cracovia Twitter, 13 June 2023
- Ботев официално е един от най-старите клубове в света "Botev is officially one of the oldest clubs in the world", 2 May 2024
- Club of Pioneers on marca.com
- sportsviahistoryfc.substack.com, 18 April 2024
- sportsviahistoryfc.substack.com, 3 May 2024
- sportsviahistoryfc.substack.com, 10 July 2024

== See also ==
- Oldest football clubs
- List of oldest football competitions
