= 1990 Soviet First League =

Soviet First League
- Season: 1990
- Champions: FC Spartak Vladikavkaz
- Promoted: FC Spartak Vladikavkaz; FC Pakhtakor Tashkent; FC Metalurh Zaporizhia; FC Lokomotiv Moscow
- Relegated: FC Kuzbass Kemerevo
- Top goalscorer: (37) Igor Shkvyrin (Pakhtakor Tashkent)

1990 Soviet First League was part of the Soviet football competition in the second league division. After the fall of the Soviet Union some clubs left the Soviet competitions and the league was reduced.

== Teams ==
=== Promoted teams ===
- Dinamo Sukhumi – Winner of the Second League finals (returning after an absence of 28 seasons)
- Tiras Tiraspol – Winner of the Second League finals (returning after an absence of 28 seasons)
- Lokomotiv Nizhny Novgorod – Winner of the Second League finals (debut)

=== Relegated teams ===
- Lokomotiv Moscow – (Returning after 2 seasons)
- Zenit Leningrad – (Returning after 48 seasons)

=== Renamed teams ===
- Prior to the start of the season Textilshchik Tiraspol was renamed to Tiras Tiraspol.

=== Withdrawn teams ===
Prior to the start of the season all Georgian clubs (with the exception of Dinamo Sukhumi, a majority-Russian club from Abkhazia) withdrew from Soviet competitions. This included two First League clubs, FC Torpedo Kutaisi and FC Dinamo Batumi. Because of that the league was reduced to 20 as compared to the previous season of 22 participants.

=== Locations ===
Location of teams in the 1990 Soviet First League.

== League standings ==
Pos	Team	Pld	W	D	L	GF	GA	GD	Pts	Promotion or relegation
1	(Russian Soviet Federative Socialist Republic) Spartak Vladikavkaz (C, P)	38	24	9	5	73	30	+43	57	Promotion to Top League
2	(Uzbek Soviet Socialist Republic) Pakhtakor Tashkent (P)	38	23	8	7	80	45	+35	54	Promotion to Top League
3	(Ukrainian Soviet Socialist Republic) Metalurh Zaporizhzhia (P)	38	19	14	5	58	30	+28	52	Promotion to Top League
4	(Russian Soviet Federative Socialist Republic) Lokomotiv Moscow (P)	38	19	9	10	52	34	+18	47	Qualification for Promotion play-off
5	(Russian Soviet Federative Socialist Republic) Dynamo Stavropol	38	20	6	12	56	42	+14	46	
6	(Russian Soviet Federative Socialist Republic) Shinnik Yaroslavl	38	19	8	11	55	39	+16	46	
7	(Moldavian Soviet Socialist Republic) Nistru Chisinau	38	14	12	12	50	44	+6	40	
8	(Azerbaijan Soviet Socialist Republic) Neftchi Baku	38	14	10	14	52	51	+1	38	
9	(Ukrainian Soviet Socialist Republic) Tavriya Simferopol	38	11	16	11	40	38	+2	38	
10	(Russian Soviet Federative Socialist Republic) Fakel Voronezh	38	14	9	15	43	45	−2	37	
11	(Russian Soviet Federative Socialist Republic) Geolog Tyumen	38	14	9	15	38	45	−7	37	
12	(Georgian Soviet Socialist Republic) Dinamo Sukhumi	38	14	8	16	36	41	−5	36	
13	(Moldavian Soviet Socialist Republic) Tiras Tiraspol	38	10	15	13	32	45	−13	35	
14	(Armenian Soviet Socialist Republic) Kotayk Abovyan	38	12	9	17	44	52	−8	33	
15	(Russian Soviet Federative Socialist Republic) Rostselmash Rostov-on-Don	38	11	9	18	39	56	−17	31	
16	(Russian Soviet Federative Socialist Republic) Lokomotiv Nizhniy Novgorod	38	10	11	17	39	58	−19	31	
17	(Kazakh Soviet Socialist Republic) Kairat Almaty	38	10	10	18	35	50	−15	30	
18	(Russian Soviet Federative Socialist Republic) Zenit Leningrad	38	8	14	16	35	41	−6	30	
19	(Russian Soviet Federative Socialist Republic) Kuban Krasnodar	38	11	6	21	34	60	−26	28	
20	(Russian Soviet Federative Socialist Republic) Kuzbass Kemerevo (R)	38	4	6	28	21	66	−45	14	Relegation to Second League

(C) Champions; (P) Promoted; (R) Relegated

Notes:

- The city of Ordzhonikidze was renamed to Vladikavkaz.
- The city of Gorkiy was renamed to Nizhniy Novgorod.
- Kotayk Abovyan played all its home games in the neighboring Yerevan.

=== Promotion/relegation play-off ===
(13th team of the Top League and 4th team of the First League)

- Lokomotiv Moscow – Rotor Volgograd 3–1 0–1
1990-11-11

Lokomotiv Moscow	3 – 1	Rotor Volgograd
Samatov 12'; Rybakov 51'; Zhitkov 79'	Report	Fyodorovsky 76'

LFK CSKA, Moscow
Attendance: 2,000 (4,600)
Referee: Petro Kobychek (Chernivtsi)

1990-11-17

Rotor Volgograd	1 – 0	Lokomotiv Moscow
Polstyanov 1'	Report	Gallakberov (yellow card) ?' (yellow-red card) 89'

Central Stadium of Trade Unions, Volgograd
Attendance: 25,000
Referee: Vadim Zhuk (Minsk)

Lokomotiv Moscow won the promotion on 3–2 aggregate

== Top scorers ==
#	Player	Club	Goals
1	Igor Shkvyrin	Pakhtakor Tashkent	37
2	Bakhva Tedeyev	Spartak Vladikavkaz	23
3	Vali Gasimov	Neftchi Baku	22
4	Sergei Volgin	Metalurh Zaporizhia	19
5	Vyacheslav Protsenko	Nistru Chisinau	18
6	Vladimir Sushiy	Dynamo Stavropol	16
7	Robert Kocharyan	Kotayk Abovian	15
8	Georgiy Chaligava	Dinamo Sukhumi	12
8	Viktor Leonenko	Geolog Tyumen	12

== Number of teams by union republic ==
Rank	Union republic	Number of teams	Club(s)
1	RSFSR	11	Spartak Vladikavkaz, Lokomotiv Moscow, Dinamo Stavropol, Shinnik Yaroslavl, Fakel Voronezh, Geolog Tyumen, Rostselmash Rostov-na-Donu, Lokomotiv Nizhniy Novgorod, Zenit Saint Petersburg, Kuban Krasnodar, Kuzbass Kemerovo
2	Moldavian SSR	2	Tiligul Tiraspol, Nistru Kishenev
2	Ukrainian SSR	2	Metallurg Zaporozhye, Tavriya Simferopol
5	Armenian SSR	1	Kotaik Abovian
5	Uzbek SSR	1	Pakhtakor Tashkent
5	Azerbaijan SSR	1	Neftchi Baku
5	Georgian SSR / (Abkhazia)	1	Dinamo Sukhumi
5	Kazakh SSR	1	Kairat Alma-Ata

== Attendances ==
No.	Club	Average
1	Spartak Vladikavkaz	18,784
2	Dinamo Stavropol	13,579
3	Paxtakor	13,474
4	Metalurh Zaporizhzhya	13,395
5	Nistru	10,084
6	Neftçhi	8,782
7	Nizhny Novgorod	6,889
8	Tavriya	5,921
9	Sukhumi	5,889
10	Tiras	5,242
11	Fakel	4,547
12	Kuban	3,900
13	Tyumen	3,732
14	Shinnik	3,432
15	Kairat	3,242
16	Rostselmash	2,511
17	Kuzbass	2,511
18	Zenit	2,005
19	Lokomotiv Moscow	1,879
20	Kotayk	1,400

== See also ==
- 1990 Soviet Top League
- 1990 Soviet Second League
- 1990 Soviet Second League B
