= Vladimir Sushiy =

Russian footballer

Personal information
- Full name: Vladimir Ivanovich Sushiy
- Date of birth: 26 June 1960 (age 66)
- Height: 1.82 m (5 ft 11 1/2 in)
- Position: Forward

Senior career*
Years	Team	Apps	(Gls)
1979	Shakhter Gorlovka	22	(2)
1982–1983	Mashuk Pyatigorsk	60	(23)
1984	Rotor Volgograd	29	(7)
1985–1986	Mashuk Pyatigorsk	61	(35)
1987–1992	Dynamo Stavropol	214	(56)
1992	Dynamo Izobilny	2	(2)
1993	Terek Grozny	15	(8)
1993	Dynamo Stavropol	6	(0)
1994	Lokomotiv Nizhny Novgorod	17	(1)
1995	Venets Gulkevichi	7	(0)
1995	Bobruisk	2	(1)
1996–1997	Gigant Sotnikovskoye		
1998–1999	Kolos Krasnogvardeyskoye		

Managerial career
- 1995: Lokomotiv Nizhny Novgorod (administrator)
- * Club domestic league appearances and goals as of 1 January 2009

Vladimir Ivanovich Sushiy (Russian: Владимир Иванович Суший; born 26 June 1960) is a retired Russian professional footballer. He made his professional debut in the Soviet Second League in 1982 for FC Mashuk Pyatigorsk.
