= Vyacheslav Protsenko =

Russian footballer and coach

Personal information
- Full name: Vyacheslav Vyacheslavovich Protsenko
- Date of birth: 26 October 1974 (age 52)
- Height: 1.81 m (5 ft 11 1/2 in)
- Position: Midfielder

Youth career
- DYuSSh Nova Kakhovka

Senior career*
Years	Team	Apps	(Gls)
1992	FC Olympik Kharkiv	37	(1)
1993–1995	FC Zhemchuzhina-Sochi	46	(5)
1996–1998	FC Energiya Chaykovsky	110	(11)
1999–2001	FC Metallurg Krasnoyarsk	61	(0)
2004–2005	FC Dynamo Kirov	34	(0)
2006	FC Metallurg Krasnoyarsk	20	(0)
2006–2014	FC Dynamo Kirov	103	(0)

International career
1993–1994	Russia U-21	2	(1)

Managerial career
- 2015: FC Dynamo Kirov (assistant)
- 2015: FC Dynamo Kirov
- 2015–2017: FC Dynamo Kirov (assistant)
- * Club domestic league appearances and goals

Vyacheslav Vyacheslavovich Protsenko (Russian: Вячеслав Вячеславович Проценко; born 26 October 1974) is a Russian professional football coach and a former player. He also holds Ukrainian citizenship.

== Club career ==
He made his debut in the Russian Premier League in 1993 for FC Zhemchuzhina-Sochi.
