= 1991 A Lyga =

A Lyga
- Season: 1991
- Champions: Žalgiris; 1st league title

The Lithuanian A Lyga 1991 was the first season of top-tier football in Lithuania. It was contested by 15 teams, and FK Žalgiris won the championship.

== Regular season ==
=== Standings ===
Pos	Team	Pld	W	D	L	GF	GA	GD	Pts	Qualification or relegation
1	Žalgiris (C)	14	11	2	1	31	8	+23	24	Qualification to championship play-off
2	Banga Kaunas	14	9	4	1	24	10	+14	22	Qualification to championship play-off
3	Neris	14	8	5	1	17	5	+12	21	Qualification to championship play-off
4	Ekranas	14	10	1	3	24	10	+14	21	Qualification to championship play-off
5	Sirijus	14	8	4	2	24	10	+14	20	
6	Vilija (R)	14	5	4	5	23	21	+2	14	Defunct after end of season
7	Granitas Klaipėda	14	5	4	5	15	14	+1	14	
8	Panerys	14	6	2	6	20	13	+7	14	
9	Sakalas	14	5	3	6	13	16	−3	13	
10	Elektronas	14	4	2	8	15	23	−8	10	
11	Vienybė	14	3	4	7	9	16	−7	10	
12	Jovaras	14	3	3	8	13	18	−5	9	
13	Tauras Šiauliai	14	3	2	9	9	26	−17	8	
14	Inkaras	14	2	4	8	7	15	−8	8	
15	Sūduva (R)	14	0	2	12	5	44	−39	2	Relegation to 1 Lyga

(C) Champions; (R) Relegated

=== Results ===
Home \ Away	BAN	EKR	ELE	GRA	INK	JOV	NER	PAN	SAK	SIR	SŪD	TAU	VIE	VIL	ŽAL
Banga Kaunas						1–1	1–3	2–0				3–0	1–0	2–0	1–1
Ekranas	1–3			2–0				2–0	3–1				2–0	2–1	0–1
Elektronas	0–1	0–2		2–0	2–1				0–0	0–2	5–1				
Granitas Klaipėda	1–3					1–1		1–0	3–1				1–0	0–1	2–2
Inkaras	1–1	0–1		0–0					0–1	0–1			0–0	3–3	
Jovaras		0–1	3–1		0–1		0–1			1–3	2–0	1–1			
Neris		1–0	1–0	1–0	3–0				1–0	1–1	0–0				
Panerys			2–0		1–0	1–0	1–0				8–0	4–0			0–1
Sakalas	0–0					1–2		1–1				1–0	4–1	2–0	0–1
Sirijus	1–2	2–2		1–1				1–1	4–1				1–0	3–0	
Sūduva	1–3	0–2		1–4	0–1				0–1	0–1			0–0		
Tauras Šiauliai		1–4	2–1	0–1	1–0		0–0			0–3	2–0				
Vienybė			0–1			2–1	1–1	3–1				2–1		0–0	0–2
Vilija			2–2			1–0	1–1	2–0			10–2	2–1			0–3
Žalgiris			6–1		1–0	3–1	0–3			1–0	5–0	4–0			

Legend: Blue = home team win; Yellow = draw; Red = away team win.

== Championship play-off ==
=== Semifinals ===
Žalgiris	0 – 1 4 – 1	FK Ekranas

Neris	2 – 1 2 – 1	Banga Kaunas

=== Third place match ===
Banga Kaunas	3 – 1	Ekranas

=== Final ===
Žalgiris	3 – 1	Neris
