= ROMAR Mažeikiai =

Lithuanian football club

ROMAR FC
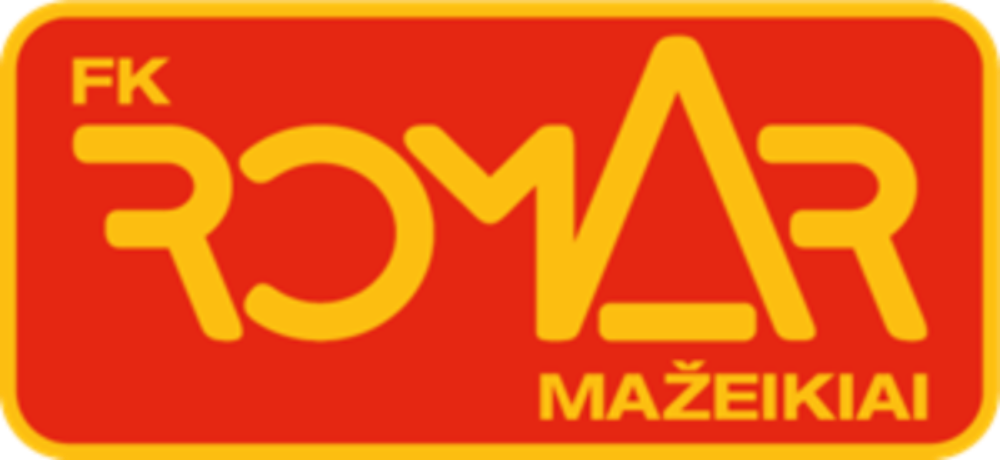
- Full name: Mažeikių futbolo klubas "ROMAR"
- Founded: 1992; 34 years ago
- Dissolved: 1995; 31 years ago
- Ground: Mažeikiai Stadium
- Capacity: 5,000
- Coordinates: 56°18′10″N 22°20′30″E
- Chairman: Romas Marcinkevičius
- 1994–1995: 3rd, A Lyga
Home colours	Away colours

Futbolo klubas ROMAR, commonly known as ROMAR, was a Lithuanian football club in Mažeikiai, in the center of Mažeikiai District.

== History ==
The club was created in 1992, when some football people from Mažeikiai asked sponsorship for FK Mažeikiai (also known as FK Jovaras).

The Lithuanian businessman Romas Marcinkevičius established a new football club and named it FK ROMAR. This club took over the place of FK Jovaras/Mažeikiai in the A Lyga. In 1993, ROMAR finished the league in sixth position, and in the 1993–94 A Lyga season, it won the Lithuanian championship. In 1995, Romar finished in third position.

Afterwards, ROMAR lost its main sponsor, as Romas Marcinkevičius left Lithuania and emigrated to Canada. The club dissolved in 1995.

=== ROMAR seasons ===
Season	League	Tier	Place	Played	Won	Drawn	Lost	Goals+	Goals-	Points	Cup	Europe	Notes
1992–93	A lyga	I	6	27	11	4	12	27	27	36	1/4 f.		
1993–94	A lyga	I	1	22	17	4	1	53	10	38	1/2 f.		
1994–95	A lyga	I	3	22	15	4	3	51	14	34	1/2 f.		
1995–96	A lyga	I	x	x	x	x	x	x	x	x	x		

== Achievements ==
=== Domestic ===
(Lithuania) Lithuanian Championship:

- Champions - 1

1993–94

- 3rd place - 1

1994–95

== Stadium ==
Club played their home matches in Mažeikiai Stadium.
