= Andrei Fyodorovskiy =

Russian footballer and coach

Personal information
- Full name: Andrei Sergeyevich Fyodorovskiy
- Date of birth: December 7, 1963 (age 62)
- Height: 1.87 m (6 ft 1 1/2 in)
- Position: Defender

Senior career*
Years	Team	Apps	(Gls)
1981–1982	FC Dynamo Makhachkala	52	(1)
1984	FC Dynamo Moscow	0	(0)
1985–1989	Neftchi Baku PFC	60	(1)
1989–1992	FC Rotor Volgograd	52	(1)

Managerial career
- 1995: FC Rotor Volgograd (assistant)
- 2000: FC Rotor-2 Volgograd (assistant)
- 2002–2003: FC Olimpia Volgograd
- 2004: FC Olimpia Volgograd (assistant)
- * Club domestic league appearances and goals as of 1 January 2009

Andrei Sergeyevich Fyodorovskiy (Russian: Андрей Серге́евич Фёдоровский; born December 7, 1963) is a Russian professional football coach and a former player. He made his professional debut in the Soviet Second League in 1981 for FC Dynamo Makhachkala.

== Honours ==
- USSR Federation Cup finalist: 1988.
