= FC Progress Chernyakhovsk =

- Full name: Football Club Progress Chernyakhovsk
- Founded: 1960
- Ground: Progress Stadium
- Capacity: 3000
- League: Kaliningrad Region Supreme League
- 2014: 2nd

FC Progress Chernyakhovsk (Russian: «Прогресс» (Черняховск)) is a Russian football team from Chernyakhovsk. It played professionally from 1990 to 1993. Their best result was 8th place in Zone 5 of the Russian Second Division in 1993.

In 1990 they played in the Baltic League.

They currently play in Kaliningrad Region Supreme League

== See also ==
- Yorck Boyen Insterburg - a team that played in Chernyakhovsk (then Insterburg) when it was part of Germany.
