= FK Neris Vilnius =

Lithuanian football team

- Full name: AFK Neris Vilnius
- Founded: 1991
- Dissolved: 1994
- League: A Lyga
- 1992–93: 11th

AFK Neris Vilnius was a Lithuanian football team from the city of Vilnius.

In 1991 it was known as Vilnius Makabi, and supported by the Lithuanian Sports Club Makabi. The club dissolved in 1994.

== Participation in Lithuanian Championships ==
- 1992–93 – 11th
- 1991–92 – 6th
- 1991 – 2nd
- 1990 – 11th

== Season-by-season ==
Lithuania

Season	Div.	Pos.	Pl.	W	D	L	Goals	P	Top Scorer	Cup	Europe
1991	1st	2	14	8	5	1	17–5	21			
