= FK Tauras Tauragė =

Association football club in Lithuania

FK Tauras
- Full name: Tauragės futbolo klubas
- Founded: 1942; 84 years ago
- Ground: Vytautas Stadium; Tauragė
- Capacity: 3,500
- Manager: Syarhey Kuznyatsow
- League: I Lyga
- 2025: I Lyga, 3rd of 16
Home colours	Away colours

Tauro futbolo klubas, commonly known as FK Tauras or simply Tauras, is a Lithuanian professional football club based in Tauragė. The club competes in the II Lyga, the third tier of Lithuanian football.

== History ==
The club was founded 1942 in the Lithuanian city Tauragė. Having not reached a national cup final for 20 years, the club became runners-up in the 2008–09 Lithuanian Football Cup.

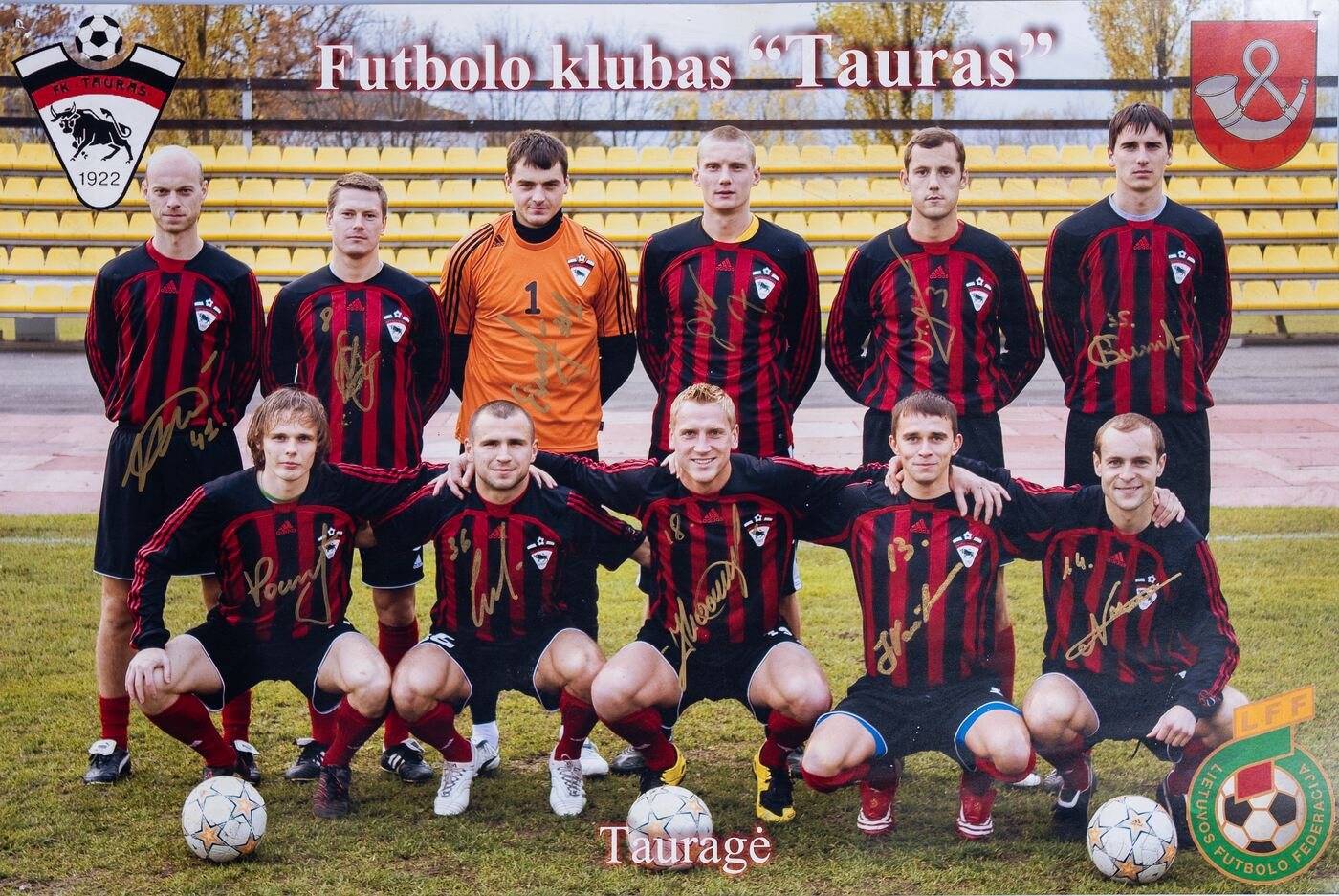
Tauras players in 2009

== Name ==
During its history the club has changed its name several times:

- 1942 – Tauras
- 1947 – Žalgiris
- 1957 – Maistas
- 1959 – Maisto Sporto Klubas (MSK)
- 1962 – Tauras
- 1990 – Elektronas
- 1992 – Tauras-Karšuva
- 1995 – Tauras
- 2005 – Tauras ERRA
- 2008 – Tauras

== European record ==
UEFA Europa League:

Season	Round	Country	Club	Home	Away	Aggregate
2010–11	Q1	(Wales)	Llanelli	3–2 (aet)	2–2	5–4
2010–11	Q2	(Cyprus)	APOEL	0–3	1–3	1–6
2011–12	Q2	(Netherlands)	ADO Den Haag	2–3	0–2	2–5

== Achievements ==
- Lithuanian SSR championship: 1

1987

== Current squad ==
As of 27 January, 2026

Note: Flags indicate national team as defined under FIFA eligibility rules; some limited exceptions apply. Players may hold more than one non-FIFA nationality.

No.	Pos.	Nation	Player
1	GK	LTU	Sidas Mačaitis
12	GK	LTU	Jurgis Mikšiūnas (on loan from Kauno Žalgiris)
51	GK	LTU	Kristupas Lankauskas
4	DF	LTU	Martynas Statkus
13	DF	LTU	Karolis Gvildys
17	DF	LTU	Marat Krasikov
88	DF	LTU	Paulius Trijonis
94	DF	LTU	Egidijus Dusevičius
5	MF	LTU	Dovydas Druktenis
8	MF	LTU	Dominykas Kubilinskas
11	MF	UKR	Artem Radchenko
14	MF	UKR	Ivan Koshkosh
18	MF	NGA	Chibuike Nwosu
19	MF	LTU	Nedas Totilas
20	MF	UKR	Artem Onishchenko
21	MF	LTU	Mantas Pikčiūnas
77	MF	LTU	Justas Petravičius
7	FW	BRA	Jorge Eduardo
9	FW	UKR	Yehor Rohach
10	FW	UKR	Illia Sereda

== Former players ==
- (Lithuania) Egidijus Vaitkūnas (2009; 2025)
- (Italy) Alessandro Mascia (2012)
- (Brazil) Jorge Eduardo (2025–)

== Managers ==
- (Lithuania) Jonas Stažys (1987)
- (Lithuania) Šenderis Giršovičius (1987–1988)
- (Lithuania) Edvardas Malkevičius (2009)
- (Belarus) Aleksandr Brazevich (2009)
- (Lithuania) Jurijus Popkovas (2009)
- (Lithuania) Gediminas Jarmalavičius (2009–2011)
- (Italy) Giovanni Scanu (2012)
- (Belarus) Aleksandr Brazevich (2013)
- (Turkey) Ramazan Silin (2013)
- (Lithuania) Gediminas Jarmalavičius (2013)
- (Italy) Giovanni Scanu (2015)
- (Lithuania) Žydrūnas Mačaitis (2020)
- (Lithuania) Darius Stažys (2021–2023)
- (Lithuania) Darius Gvildys (2024–2025)
- (Belarus) Syarhey Kuznyatsow (3 December 2025)
