= FK Sirijus Klaipėda =

- Full name: Futbolo Klubas Sirijus Klaipėda
- Founded: 1973
- Dissolved: 1995
- Ground: Žalgiris Stadium, Klaipėda
- Capacity: 9,000
- League: A lyga
- 1994/95: 11th
| Home colours | Away colours |

FK Sirijus Klaipėda was a Lithuanian football club, played in the Žalgiris Stadium in Klaipėda. The club won the Lithuanian Championship in 1990, and twice won the Lithuanian Football Cup: in 1988 and 1990.

Founded in 1973 as Syrius Klaipėda, the club was renamed in 1989 to FK Sirijus Klaipėda. In 1996, the club was dissolved.

== Season-by-season ==
Lithuania

| Season | Div. | Pos. | Pl. | W | D | L | Goals | P | Top Scorer | Cup | Europe |
|---|---|---|---|---|---|---|---|---|---|---|---|
| 1991 | 1st | 5 | 14 | 8 | 4 | 2 | 24–10 | 20 | | | |

== Achievements ==
- Lithuanian Championship: 1

1990

- Lithuanian Cup: 2

1988, 1990
