= List of Lithuanian football transfers winter 2016–17 =

This is a list of transfers in Lithuanian football for the 2016–17 winter transfer window. Only confirmed moves featuring an A Lyga side are listed.

The winter transfer window opens on January 2, 2017, and will close on February 26, 2017. Deals may be signed at any given moment in the season, but the actual transfer may only take place during the transfer window. Unattached players may sign at any moment.

== Transfers In ==
Date	Name	Moving from	Moving to	Type	Source
6 December 2016	Simonas Stankevičius	HNK Šibenik	Žalgiris	End of loan spell	
6 December 2016	Georgas Freidgeimas	Irtysh Pavlodar	Žalgiris	End of loan spell	
6 December 2016	Tautvydas Eliošius	Jonava	Žalgiris	End of loan spell	
6 December 2016	Daniel Romanovskij	Utenis	Žalgiris	End of loan spell	
7 December 2016	Giedrius Matulevičius	Sampdoria	Sūduva	Undisclosed	
8 December 2016	Ričardas Šveikauskas	LOSC	Atlantas	Undisclosed	
8 December 2016	Arkadiy Zhelnin	Baltika	Atlantas	Undisclosed	
9 December 2016	Dominykas Galkevičius	Jonava	Sūduva	Free	
12 December 2016	Rolandas Baravykas	Atlantas	Žalgiris	Free	
23 December 2016	Simonas Juška	Palanga	Atlantas	Free	
25 December 2016	Martynas Dapkus	Trakai	Šilas	Free	
26 December 2016	Valdemar Borovskij	Jonava	Trakai	Free	
27 December 2016	Karolis Laukžemis	Jelgava	Sūduva	End of loan spell	
27 December 2016	Justinas Popiera	F.B.K. Kaunas	Sūduva	End of loan spell	
27 December 2016	Klaudijus Upstas	Stumbras	Trakai	Free	
11 January 2017	Benjamin Boateng	Berekum Chelsea	Stumbras	Free	
11 January 2017	Nerijus Mačiulis	Stumbras	Šilas	Free	
11 January 2017	Povilas Valinčius	Atlantas	Šilas	Free	
12 January 2017	Benjamin Terry	Ashanti Gold	Stumbras	Undisclosed	
12 January 2017	Dennis Nyarko	Maapbeyer	Stumbras	Undisclosed	
23 January 2017	Kostyantyn Shults	Shirak	Atlantas	Free	
23 January 2017	Andrei Ciofu	Speranța Nisporeni	Atlantas	Free	
28 January 2017	Robertas Vėževičius	Stumbras	Sūduva	Free	
28 January 2017	Marjan Altiparmakovski	NK Inter Zaprešić	Sūduva	Undisclosed	
30 January 2017	Darvydas Šernas	Alanyaspor	Žalgiris	Free	
1 February 2017	Karolis Šilkaitis	Kauno Žalgiris	Jonava	Free	
2 February 2017	Daniel Romanovskij	Žalgiris	Stumbras	Loan	
2 February 2017	Dominykas Barauskas	Žalgiris	Stumbras	Loan	
4 February 2017	Andrei Panyukov	Braga	Atlantas	End of loan spell	
7 February 2017	Tautvydas Eliošius	Žalgiris	Jonava	Free	
7 February 2017	Levan Chapodze	Tskhinvali	Kauno Žalgiris	Free	
9 February 2017	Komnen Andrić	Belenenses	Žalgiris	Loan	
9 February 2017	Bruno Pires	Belenenses	Stumbras	Undisclosed	
9 February 2017	Marcos Junior	Lusitano VRSA	Stumbras	Undisclosed	
10 February 2017	Lukas Žukauskas	Utenis	Trakai	End of loan spell	
10 February 2017	Valentin Jeriomenko	Kirkenes	Utenis	Free	
10 February 2017	André Almeida	Belenenses	Stumbras	Free	
12 February 2017	Ovidijus Verbickas	Atlantas	Sūduva	Free	
12 February 2017	Lukas Valvonis	Žalgiris	Utenis	Free	
13 February 2017	Casper Bruun	VB	Utenis	Free	
14 February 2017	Rokas Krušnauskas	Jonava	Kauno Žalgiris	Undisclosed	
14 February 2017	Lukas Sendžikas	DFK Dainava	Kauno Žalgiris	Free	
14 February 2017	Karol Salik	Wigry Suwałki	Jonava	Free	
15 February 2017	Artem Gurenko	Trakai	Sūduva	Free	
16 February 2017	Levan Macharashvili	Obolon-Brovar	Stumbras	Free	
17 February 2017	Aleksandar Živanović	Mladost Lučani	Sūduva	Free	
17 February 2017	Mahamane Traoré	Nice	Žalgiris	Free	
19 February 2017	Rodrigo Josviaki	Coritiba	Stumbras	Free	
19 February 2017	André Silva	Oeiras	Stumbras	Free	
22 February 2017	Evan Alexandrow-Ridley	Stumbras	Atlantas	Free	
22 February 2017	Deividas Mikelionis	Kauno Žalgiris	Atlantas	Loan	
22 February 2017	Darius Kazubovičius	Žalgiris	Trakai	Free	
22 February 2017	Svajūnas Čyžas	Panevėžys	Trakai	Free	
22 February 2017	Rudinilson Silva	Lechia Gdańsk	Utenis	Free	
23 February 2017	Nemanja Bjelan	Nevėžis	Kauno Žalgiris	Free	
23 February 2017	Aldas Korsakas	Žalgiris	Stumbras	Free	
23 February 2017	Marcelo Muniz	Feirense	Stumbras	Free	
24 February 2017	Edvinas Baniulis	Žalgiris	Utenis	Free	
24 February 2017	Vladislav Nikitin	Zenit Saint Petersburg	Utenis	Undisclosed	
24 February 2017	Shakhrom Sulaimonov	HJK	Utenis	Undisclosed	
25 February 2017	Radanfah Abu Bakr	Sillamäe Kalev	Sūduva	Free	
25 February 2017	Henri Ndong	Auxerre	Sūduva	Free	
25 February 2017	Dejan Garača	Syrianska	Utenis	Free	
25 February 2017	Robertas Freidgeimas	Utenis	Atlantas	Free	
25 February 2017	Yuriy Vereshchak	Utenis	Atlantas	Free	
25 February 2017	Sergei Obivalin	Krylia Sovetov	Atlantas	Free	
25 February 2017	Edgaras Žarskis	Jonava	Atlantas	Free	
26 February 2017	Linas Pilibaitis	Žalgiris	Atlantas	Free	
26 February 2017	Donatas Kazlauskas	Lechia Gdańsk	Atlantas	Free	
27 February 2017	Martynas Dapkus	Šilas	Jonava	Free	
27 February 2017	Marius Papšys	Atlantas	Stumbras	Free	
27 February 2017	Anestis Karakostas	Aiginiakos	Kauno Žalgiris	Undisclosed	
28 February 2017	Fábio Lopes	Boavista	Stumbras	Free	
28 February 2017	Timotej Dodlek	Zavrč	Utenis	Free	
1 March 2017	Kirill Aleksiyan	Torpedo Minsk	Jonava	Free	
1 March 2017	Eduard Zhevnerov	Belshina Bobruisk	Jonava	Undisclosed	
1 March 2017	Vitalijs Barinovs	Riga	Jonava	Free	
1 March 2017	Andrey Chukhley	Kauno Žalgiris	Jonava	Free	
1 March 2017	Klaudijus Upstas	Trakai	Jonava	Free	
1 March 2017	Maksym Marusych	Hirnyk-Sport Komsomolsk	Jonava	Free	
1 March 2017	Davit Makaradze	Mark Stars	Jonava	Free	
1 March 2017	Marius Šalkauskas	DFK Dainava	Jonava	Free	
1 March 2017	Aurimas Raginis	Šilas	Kauno Žalgiris	Free	
1 March 2017	Nasro Bouchareb	–	Stumbras	Free	
6 March 2017	Alyaksandr Kuhan	Slutsk	Utenis	Free	
7 March 2017	Ihar Yasinski	Belshina Bobruisk	Kauno Žalgiris	Free	
8 March 2017	Vyacheslav Panfilov	Veres Rivne	Utenis	Free	
8 March 2017	Mykola Vechurko	Ternopil	Utenis	Free	
8 March 2017	Serge Nyuiadzi	1461 Trabzon	Žalgiris	Free	
10 March 2017	Mario Duque	Villanueva	Kauno Žalgiris	Free	
14 March 2017	Deividas Šešplaukis	Hércules	Sūduva	Undisclosed	
14 March 2017	Rokas Lekiatas	Lorquí	Sūduva	Undisclosed	
15 March 2017	Kgaogelo Sekgota	Polokwane United	Stumbras	Undisclosed	
1 April 2017	Agostinho Cá	Barcelona B	Stumbras	Free	
1 April 2017	Diogo David	Real	Stumbras	Free	
4 April 2017	Maksim Maksimov	Atlantas	Trakai	Free	
5 April 2017	Yohei Iwasaki	Green Gully	Kauno Žalgiris	Free	
24 April 2017	Stefan Cebara	ViOn Zlaté Moravce	Utenis	Free	
24 April 2017	Rok Štraus	Yokohama	Utenis	Free	
12 May 2017	Povilas Valinčius	Šilas	Jonava	Free	

== Transfers Out ==
Date	Name	Moving from	Moving to	Type	Source
17 October 2016	Andrius Velička	Kauno Žalgiris	–	Retired	
28 November 2016	Dmytro Babenko	Jonava	Free Market	Released	
30 November 2016	Pavel Kotov	Stumbras	Free Market	Released	
30 November 2016	Maksim Ermakov	Stumbras	Free Market	Released	
30 November 2016	Giorgio Russo	Stumbras	Free Market	Released	
30 November 2016	Kennedy Eriba	Stumbras	Jelgava	End of loan spell	
2 December 2016	Marius Žaliūkas	Žalgiris	Free Market	Released	
8 December 2016	Andrius Jokšas	Atlantas	–	Retired	
8 December 2016	Evaldas Razulis	Atlantas	Jelgava	Free	
31 December 2016	Abdoul Sylla	Atlantas	Free Market	Released	
31 December 2016	Lukas Pušinskas	Atlantas	Free Market	Released	
3 January 2017	Tomas Radzinevičius	Sūduva	Valletta	Free	
3 January 2017	Valentin Baranovskij	Sūduva	Free Market	Released	
4 January 2017	Predrag Pavlović	Sūduva	Mladost Lučani	Free	
6 January 2017	Gabrielius Judickas	Sūduva	Alta de Lisboa	Free	
9 January 2017	Eugen Zasavitchi	Trakai	GKS Tychy	Loan	
11 January 2017	Andrija Kaluđerović	Žalgiris	Port	Free	
18 January 2017	Nerijus Valskis	Trakai	Bnei Yehuda	Undisclosed	
18 January 2017	Marius Miškinis	Kauno Žalgiris	Free Market	Released	
21 January 2017	Nermin Jamak	Sūduva	Zrinjski Mostar	Free	
23 January 2017	Eligijus Jankauskas	Sūduva	MŠK Žilina	€160,000	
24 January 2017	Marin Matoš	Žalgiris	Gorica	Free	
27 January 2017	Giorgos Pelagias	Trakai	Apollon Limassol	Free	
27 January 2017	Admir Kecap	Sūduva	Novi Pazar	Free	
29 January 2017	Rafael Broetto	Stumbras	Marítimo	Undisclosed	
31 January 2017	Abdul Basit	Stumbras	Marítimo	Loan	
1 February 2017	Aleksei Yepifanov	Atlantas	Sillamäe Kalev	Free	
3 February 2017	Kazimieras Gnedojus	Atlantas	Banga	Free	
5 February 2017	Cristian Alex	Stumbras	Gifu	Free	
6 February 2017	Matas Radžiukynas	Stumbras	União de Leiria	Free	
10 February 2017	Ihor Poruchynskyy	Utenis	Free Market	Released	
10 February 2017	Ivan Lukaniuk	Utenis	Free Market	Released	
12 February 2017	Rimvydas Sadauskas	Stumbras	Cork City	Loan	
12 February 2017	Ernestas Pilypas	Kauno Žalgiris	Stal Rzeszów	Free	
15 February 2017	Karolis Gvildys	Kauno Žalgiris	DFK Dainava	Free	
16 February 2017	Tomas Dombrauskis	Utenis	Džiugas	Free	
17 February 2017	Vitaliy Polyanskyi	Utenis	Džiugas	Free	
18 February 2017	Simonas Stankevičius	Žalgiris	Mjøndalen	Undisclosed	
18 February 2017	Ilya Trachynski	Šilas	Slutsk	Free	
24 February 2017	Aleksandr Bushmin	Atlantas	Amkar Perm	Undisclosed	
25 February 2017	Jorge Chula	Žalgiris	Free Market	Released	
1 March 2017	Martynas Dūda	Jonava	Kufstein	Free	
1 March 2017	Arnas Gabulas	Jonava	Free Market	Released	
1 March 2017	Eisvinas Utyra	Jonava	–	Retired	
1 March 2017	Kristijonas Martinaitis	Jonava	Free Market	Released	
1 March 2017	Vladislav Chernyakov	Jonava	Free Market	Released	
6 March 2017	Arkadiy Zhelnin	Atlantas	Džiugas	Loan	
6 March 2017	Skirmantas Rakauskas	Atlantas	Džiugas	Loan	
7 March 2017	Ričardas Šveikauskas	Atlantas	Palanga	Loan	
10 March 2017	Andrius Urbšys	Šilas	Free Market	Released	
10 March 2017	Audrius Račkus	Šilas	Free Market	Released	
10 March 2017	Vilmantas Bagdanavičius	Šilas	Free Market	Released	
10 March 2017	Gytis Urba	Šilas	Free Market	Released	
10 March 2017	Alfredas Skroblas	Šilas	Free Market	Released	
12 March 2017	Ivan Carandasov	Jonava	Academia Chișinău	Free	
14 March 2017	Ilya Tsyvilko	Šilas	DFK Dainava	Free	
14 March 2017	Arminas Vaskela	Utenis	Vytis	Free	
14 March 2017	Mindaugas Malinauskas	Šilas	Vytis	Free	
14 March 2017	Lukas Miščiukas	Jonava	Vytis	Free	
16 March 2017	Marcelo Muniz	Stumbras	DFK Dainava	Loan	
20 March 2017	Bruno Pires	Stumbras	Free Market	Released	
20 March 2017	Simonas Juška	Atlantas	Palanga	Loan	
20 March 2017	Audrius Brokas	Šilas	Tauras	Free	
22 March 2017	Andrey Lyasyuk	Kauno Žalgiris	Nevėžis	Free	
30 March 2017	Neilas Urba	Atlantas	Koralas	Loan	
30 March 2017	Jonas Bičkus	Atlantas	Koralas	Loan	
30 March 2017	Mikhail Bashilov	Utenis	Gorodeya	Free	
31 March 2017	Titas Vitukynas	Trakai	DFK Dainava	Free	
31 March 2017	Karolis Čirba	Žalgiris	Vytis	Free	
1 April 2017	Giedrius Kvedaras	Jonava	Kråkerøy	Free	
15 April 2017	Jevgenij Moroz	Utenis	Free Market	Released	
15 April 2017	Vyacheslav Panfilov	Utenis	Free Market	Released	
12 May 2017	Tadas Labukas	Trakai	Free Market	Released	
12 May 2017	Anestis Karakostas	Kauno Žalgiris	Free Market	Released	
12 May 2017	Rokas Sikorskis	Kauno Žalgiris	Free Market	Released	
12 May 2017	Donatas Stulga	Kauno Žalgiris	Free Market	Released	
12 May 2017	Marius Šalkauskas	Jonava	Free Market	Released	

== Trials ==
Only following cases apply to this category:

- Player was on trial in A Lyga club, but haven't joined any club of the league;
- Player from the league was away in any other club for a trial, but wasn't sold, loaned out or released to another club in this transfer window.

Date	Name	Moving from	Moving to	Type	Source
22 November 2016	Edvinas Kloniūnas	Kauno Žalgiris	Dukla	Trial	
21 December 2016	Vilius Armanavičius	Stumbras	Marítimo	Trial	
21 December 2016	Vilius Armalas	Stumbras	Marítimo	Trial	
31 December 2016	Donatas Konikas	Stumbras	Vitória de Setúbal	Trial	
31 December 2016	Sofoniyas Asres	Stumbras	Vitória de Setúbal	Trial	
6 January 2017	Justas Vaišnys	Sveikata	Šilas	Trial	
6 January 2017	Deividas Karpavičius	Sveikata	Šilas	Trial	
6 January 2017	Tomas Bučma	Kauno Žalgiris	Šilas	Trial	
9 January 2017	Gabrielius Zagurskas	Utenis	Sūduva	Trial	
10 January 2017	Vytas Gašpuitis	Atlantas	Rostov	Trial	
10 January 2017	Mindaugas Bagužis	Palanga	Atlantas	Trial	
12 January 2017	Alexandre Kore	Stumbras	Lokomotiv Moscow	Trial	
13 January 2017	César Romero	Coras	Žalgiris	Trial	
18 January 2017	Linas Klimavičius	Žalgiris	Sheriff	Trial	
18 January 2017	Pavel Kotov	Stumbras	Orlando City	Trial	
27 January 2017	Faty Papy	Bidvest Wits	Žalgiris	Trial	
1 February 2017	Aleksandr Sikorskiy	Baltika Kaliningrad	Jonava	Trial	
1 February 2017	Tadas Paulikas	Nevėžis	Sūduva	Trial	
1 February 2017	Gratas Sirgėdas	FC Amberg	Kauno Žalgiris	Trial	
2 February 2017	Azamat Dzoblayev	Spartak Vladikavkaz	Šilas	Trial	
3 February 2017	Yuriy Abaturov	Vranov	Stumbras	Trial	
10 February 2017	Vytas Gašpuitis	Atlantas	Ordabasy	Trial	
11 February 2017	Alekos Alekou	Poprad	Atlantas	Trial	

== Managerial changes ==
Date	Name	Moving from	Moving to	Type	Source
14 December 2016	Robertas Poškus	Jonava	Free Market	Released	
14 December 2016	Donatas Vencevičius	Wigry	Jonava	Free	
3 January 2017	Vitalijus Stankevičius	Nevėžis	Kauno Žalgiris	Free	
9 January 2017	Zvezdan Milošević	Free Market	Utenis	Free	
19 January 2017	Serhiy Kovalets	Trakai	Free Market	Released	
19 January 2017	Oleg Vasilenko	RFS	Trakai	Free	
10 March 2017	Gediminas Jarmalavičius	Šilas	Free Market	Released	
26 April 2017	Zvezdan Milošević	Utenis	Free Market	Released	
2 May 2017	Vitalijus Stankevičius	Kauno Žalgiris	Free Market	Released	
15 May 2017	David Campaña	Free Market	Utenis	Free	
17 May 2017	Konstantin Sarsania	Atlantas	Zenit Saint Petersburg	Undisclosed	
