= 2016 A Lyga =

A Lyga
- Season: 2016
- Champions: Žalgiris
- Champions League: Žalgiris
- Europa League: Trakai; Sūduva Marijampolė; Atlantas
- Matches: 129
- Goals: 358 (2.78 per match)
- Top goalscorer: Andrija Kaluđerović (20 goals)
- Biggest home win: Sūduva 6–1 Stumbras (22 October 2016)
- Biggest away win: Stumbras 0–5 Žalgiris (24 June 2016)
- Highest scoring: Stumbras 3–6 Žalgiris (12 March 2016)
- Longest winning run: Žalgiris (9 games)
- Longest unbeaten run: Žalgiris (16 games)
- Longest winless run: Kauno Žalgiris (16 games)
- Longest losing run: Utenis (6 games)
- Highest attendance: 1,500; Žalgiris 2–0 Trakai (2 March 2016)
- Lowest attendance: 50; Kauno Žalgiris 1–3 Utenis (22 April 2016)
- Total attendance: 63,515
- Average attendance: 501

The 2016 A Lyga, also known as SMSCredit.lt A Lyga for sponsoring purposes was the 27th season of the A Lyga, the top-tier association football league of Lithuania. The season began on 2 March and ended on 26 November 2016. Žalgiris Vilnius were the defending champions.

== Teams ==
FK Šiauliai failed to obtain a license to play in the A Lyga and were relegated alongside FK Kruoja, which withdrew and FK Klaipedos Granitas, which was disqualified. They were replaced by FK Lietava Jonava, which will make its debut at the top level. FK Spyris Kaunas changed its name to FK Kauno Žalgiris.

=== Changes from 2015 ===
The league reduced its number of teams from ten sides down to eight. As a consequence, each team will play every other four times, twice at home and twice away with the top six then playing an additional round against each other.

=== Clubs and locations ===
Locations of the 2016 A Lyga teams

The following teams are competing in the 2016 championship:

| Club | Location | Stadium | Turf | Capacity | 2015 position |
|---|---|---|---|---|---|
| Atlantas | Klaipėda | Central Stadium of Klaipėda | Natural | 4,428 | 3rd |
| Atlantas | Klaipėda | Klaipėda Artificial Football Pitch | Artificial | 1,000 | 3rd |
| Kauno Žalgiris | Kaunas | Darius and Girėnas Stadium | Natural | 9,180 | 5th |
| Kauno Žalgiris | Kaunas | NFA Stadium | Artificial | 500 | 5th |
| Lietava | Jonava | Central Stadium of Jonava | Natural | 1,008 | I Lyga, 1st |
| Lietava | Kaunas^{SL} | NFA Stadium | Artificial | 500 | I Lyga, 1st |
| Lietava | Kėdainiai^{SL} | Kėdainiai Stadium | Artificial | 3,000 | I Lyga, 1st |
| Stumbras | Kaunas | Darius and Girėnas Stadium | Natural | 9,180 | 7th |
| Stumbras | Kaunas | NFA Stadium | Artificial | 500 | 7th |
| Sūduva | Marijampolė | ARVI Football Arena | Natural | 6,250 | 4th |
| Sūduva | Marijampolė | ARVI Football Indoor Arena | Artificial | 2,660 | 4th |
| Trakai | Vilnius | LFF Stadium | Artificial | 5,067 | 2nd |
| Trakai | Vilnius | Sportima Arena | Artificial | 3,157 | 2nd |
| Utenis | Utena | Utenis Stadium | Natural | 3,073 | 6th |
| Utenis | Visaginas^{SL} | Visaginas Artificial Football Pitch | Artificial | 212 | 6th |
| Žalgiris | Vilnius | LFF Stadium | Artificial | 5,067 | 1st |
| Žalgiris | Vilnius | Sportima Arena | Artificial | 3,157 | 1st |

Stadium location

=== Personnel and kits ===
Note: Flags indicate national team as has been defined under FIFA eligibility rules. Players and Managers may hold more than one non-FIFA nationality.

| Team | Head coach(es) | Captain(s) | Kit manufacturer | Shirt sponsor |
|---|---|---|---|---|
| Atlantas | (Russia) Konstantin Sarsania | (Lithuania) Andrius Bartkus | Jako | — |
| Kauno Žalgiris | (Lithuania) Laimis Bičkauskas | (Lithuania) Ignas Dedura | Joma | BC Žalgiris |
| Lietava | (Lithuania) Robertas Poškus | (Lithuania) Laurynas Stonkus | Joma | Achema |
| Stumbras | (Lithuania) Darius Gvildys (Portugal) Mariano Barreto | (Lithuania) Artūras Rimkevičius (Lithuania) Nerijus Mačiulis | Hummel | Novecorum Group |
| Sūduva | (Serbia) Aleksandar Veselinović (Lithuania) Eivinas Černiauskas (caretaker) (Kazakhstan) Vladimir Cheburin (interim) | (Lithuania) Tomas Radzinevičius | Joma | Sumeda |
| Trakai | (Lithuania) Valdas Urbonas (Belarus) Albert Rybak (interim) (Ukraine) Serhiy Kovalets | (Lithuania) Deividas Česnauskis | Nike | Ecoil |
| Utenis | (Lithuania) Mindaugas Čepas (Ukraine) Oleh Boychyshyn (interim) | (Lithuania) Valentin Jeriomenko (Lithuania) Robertas Freidgeimas | Adidas | Baltijos polistirenas |
| Žalgiris | (Lithuania) Valdas Dambrauskas | (Lithuania) Egidijus Vaitkūnas | Nike | TOP Sport |

== Regular season ==
=== Table ===
| Pos | Team | Pld | W | D | L | GF | GA | GD | Pts | Qualification or relegation |
|---|---|---|---|---|---|---|---|---|---|---|
| 1 | Žalgiris Vilnius | 28 | 21 | 3 | 4 | 62 | 22 | +40 | 66 | Qualification to Championship round |
| 2 | Trakai | 28 | 18 | 4 | 6 | 47 | 22 | +25 | 58 | Qualification to Championship round |
| 3 | Sūduva Marijampolė | 28 | 15 | 6 | 7 | 42 | 32 | +10 | 51 (Note: Head-to-head record: Sūduva–Atlantas 1–0, Atlantas–Sūduva 1–2, Sūduva–Atlantas 3–3, Atlantas–Sūduva 2–1.) | Qualification to Championship round |
| 4 | Atlantas | 28 | 15 | 6 | 7 | 38 | 25 | +13 | 51 | Qualification to Championship round |
| 5 | Lietava Jonava | 28 | 7 | 8 | 13 | 28 | 44 | −16 | 29 | Qualification to Championship round |
| 6 | Stumbras Kaunas | 28 | 7 | 6 | 15 | 35 | 52 | −17 | 27 | Qualification to Championship round |
| 7 | Utenis Utena (O) | 28 | 4 | 4 | 20 | 24 | 47 | −23 | 16 | Qualification to Relegation play-offs |
| 8 | Kauno Žalgiris | 28 | 2 | 9 | 17 | 23 | 55 | −32 | 15 | Relegation to I Lyga cancelled |

Source: UEFA Soccerway
Rules for classification: 1) Points; 2) Head-to-head points; 3) Head-to-head goal difference; 4) Head-to-head goals scored; 5) Head-to-head matches won 6) Goal difference; 7) Goals scored; 8) Matches won.
(O) Play-off winners

=== Results ===
First half of season
| Home \ Away | ATL | KAU | JON | STU | SŪD | TRA | UTE | ŽAL |
|---|---|---|---|---|---|---|---|---|
| Atlantas | | 3–1 | 2–0 | 2–0 | 1–2 | 2–2 | 1–0 | 2–1 |
| Kauno Žalgiris | 0–2 | | 1–5 | 1–2 | 2–2 | 0–2 | 1–3 | 1–1 |
| Jonava | 0–1 | 2–2 | | 2–2 | 1–1 | 0–1 | 1–0 | 0–1 |
| Stumbras | 2–3 | 0–0 | 2–0 | | 2–3 | 0–0 | 3–1 | 3–6 |
| Sūduva | 1–0 | 1–0 | 3–0 | 0–1 | | 0–2 | 2–1 | 1–0 |
| Trakai | 2–0 | 0–0 | 3–0 | 3–2 | 3–1 | | 1–0 | 1–0 |
| Utenis | 0–2 | 2–3 | 0–1 | 1–0 | 0–4 | 0–2 | | 0–1 |
| Žalgiris | 1–0 | 3–0 | 2–2 | 2–0 | 3–2 | 2–0 | 2–0 | |

Source: Soccerway
Legend: Blue = home team win; Yellow = draw; Red = away team win.

Second half of season
| Home \ Away | ATL | KAU | JON | STU | SŪD | TRA | UTE | ŽAL |
|---|---|---|---|---|---|---|---|---|
| Atlantas | | 1–1 | 0–0 | 2–0 | 2–1 | 0–1 | 2–0 | 0–1 |
| Kauno Žalgiris | 1–1 | | 0–1 | 2–1 | 0–1 | 0–4 | 1–1 | 0–2 |
| Jonava | 1–2 | 3–2 | | 1–4 | 1–1 | 1–1 | 1–0 | 0–4 |
| Stumbras | 0–2 | 2–2 | 2–1 | | 2–3 | 1–4 | 1–1 | 0–5 |
| Sūduva | 3–3 | 2–0 | 0–0 | 2–0 | | 1–0 | 2–1 | 0–0 |
| Trakai | 3–0 | 3–0 | 0–2 | 0–2 | 2–0 | | 4–3 | 1–2 |
| Utenis | 1–1 | 2–1 | 3–1 | 0–0 | 1–2 | 0–1 | | 2–4 |
| Žalgiris | 0–1 | 3–1 | 4–1 | 3–1 | 4–1 | 3–1 | 2–1 | |

Source: Soccerway
Legend: Blue = home team win; Yellow = draw; Red = away team win.

== Championship round ==
Top six will play each other once.

=== Table ===
| Pos | Team | Pld | W | D | L | GF | GA | GD | Pts | Qualification or relegation |
|---|---|---|---|---|---|---|---|---|---|---|
| 1 | Žalgiris Vilnius (C) | 33 | 24 | 4 | 5 | 74 | 29 | +45 | 76 | Qualification to Champions League second qualifying round (Note: Žalgiris Vilnius qualified for the Europa League first qualifying round by winning the 2016 Lithuanian Football Cup. However, since they qualified for European competition based on their league position, the spot awarded to the cup winners was passed down the league.) |
| 2 | Trakai | 33 | 20 | 7 | 6 | 55 | 26 | +29 | 67 | Qualification to Europa League first qualifying round |
| 3 | Sūduva Marijampolė | 33 | 17 | 7 | 9 | 55 | 41 | +14 | 58 | Qualification to Europa League first qualifying round |
| 4 | Atlantas | 33 | 16 | 8 | 9 | 42 | 32 | +10 | 56 | Qualification to Europa League first qualifying round |
| 5 | Stumbras Kaunas | 33 | 8 | 9 | 16 | 43 | 63 | −20 | 33 | |
| 6 | Lietava Jonava | 33 | 8 | 8 | 17 | 35 | 58 | −23 | 32 | |

Source: UEFA Soccerway
Rules for classification: 1) Points; 2) Play-off (only if deciding champion); 3) Head-to-head points; 4) Head-to-head goal difference; 5) Head-to-head goals scored; 6) Head-to-head matches won 7) Goal difference; 8) Goals scored; 9) Matches won.
(C) Champions

=== Results ===
| Home \ Away | ATL | JON | STU | SŪD | TRA | ŽAL |
|---|---|---|---|---|---|---|
| Atlantas | | 2–1 | | | 0–0 | |
| Jonava | | | | 3–2 | | 1–4 |
| Stumbras | 1–1 | 3–1 | | | | |
| Sūduva | 3–1 | | 6–1 | | | 1–3 |
| Trakai | | 3–1 | 1–1 | 1–1 | | |
| Žalgiris | 2–0 | | 2–2 | | 1–3 | |

Source: A Lyga
Legend: Blue = home team win; Yellow = draw; Red = away team win.

== Relegation play-offs ==
The 7th placed team will face the runners-up of the 2016 LFF I Lyga for a two-legged play-off. The winner on aggregate score after both matches will earn entry into the 2017 A Lyga.

=== First leg ===
29 October 2016
14:00

| Palanga | 2–3 | Utenis Utena |
|---|---|---|
| Navikas 74'; Bagužis 90+5' | Report | Poruchynskyy 2', 44'; Vereshchak 54' |

Palanga Stadium, Palanga
Attendance: 250
Referee: Robertas Valikonis

=== Second leg ===
6 November 2016
14:00

| Utenis Utena | 0–1 | Palanga |
|---|---|---|
| | Report | Juška 33' |

Visaginas Artificial Football Pitch, Visaginas
Attendance: 120
Referee: Manfredas Lukjančukas

3–3 on aggregate. Utenis won on away goals.

== Season statistics ==
=== Top scorers ===
| Rank | Pos. | Player | Club | Goals | Minutes played | Average minutes per goal |
|---|---|---|---|---|---|---|
| 1 | FW | (Serbia) Andrija Kaluđerović | Žalgiris | 20 | 1638 | 82 |
| 2 | MF | (Lithuania) Nerijus Valskis | Trakai | 17 | 2558 | 151 |
| 3 | FW | (Lithuania) Tomas Radzinevičius | Sūduva | 14 | 2030 | 145 |
| 4 | FW | (Russia) Maksim Maksimov | Atlantas | 10 | 2207 | 221 |
| 5 | FW | (Armenia) David Arshakyan | Trakai | 9 | 1613 | 180 |
| 5 | MF | (Lithuania) Linas Pilibaitis | Žalgiris | 9 | 1819 | 203 |
| 5 | FW | (Netherlands) Abdoul Sylla | Atlantas | 9 | 2153 | 240 |
| 5 | MF | (Lithuania) Ernestas Veliulis | Sūduva | 9 | 2537 | 282 |
| 9 | FW | (Bosnia and Herzegovina) Bahrudin Atajić | Žalgiris | 8 | 1526 | 191 |
| 9 | MF | (Serbia) Predrag Pavlović | Sūduva | 8 | 1858 | 233 |

=== Hat-tricks ===
| Player | For | Against | Result | Date | Ref |
|---|---|---|---|---|---|
| (Serbia) Andrija Kaluđerović | Žalgiris | Utenis | 4–2 (A) | 23 July 2016 | |
| (Serbia) Andrija Kaluđerović | Žalgiris | Lietava | 4–1 (H) | 27 July 2016 | |
| (Armenia) David Arshakyan | Trakai | Utenis | 4–3 (H) | 28 July 2016 | |
| (Bosnia and Herzegovina) Bahrudin Atajić | Žalgiris | Lietava | 4–0 (A) | 20 September 2016 | |
| (Serbia) Andrija Kaluđerović | Žalgiris | Lietava | 4–1 (A) | 22 October 2016 | |

== Attendance ==
| Team | GP | Total | High | Low | Average |
|---|---|---|---|---|---|
| Žalgiris | 17 | 13,394 | 1,500 | 350 | 788 |
| Sūduva | 17 | 13,190 | 1,200 | 500 | 776 |
| Atlantas | 16 | 9,850 | 1,200 | 100 | 616 |
| Lietava | 16 | 7,864 | 1,100 | 100 | 492 |
| Utenis | 14 | 4,957 | 670 | 150 | 355 |
| Kauno Žalgiris | 14 | 4,740 | 850 | 50 | 339 |
| Stumbras | 16 | 5,320 | 620 | 100 | 333 |
| Trakai | 17 | 4,200 | 430 | 100 | 248 |
| Total | 127^{α} | 63,515 | 888 | 284 | 501 |

— Official attendance statistic for the play-off matches wasn't publicly released.

== Awards ==
=== Yearly awards ===
Awards were presented at the LFF Awards ceremony, which was held on November 28. Finalists for voted awards were announced after the season and winners were presented at the award ceremony.

2016 A Lyga awards
| Award | Recipient(s) |
|---|---|
| Player of the Year | Mantas Kuklys (Žalgiris) |
| Young Player of the Year | Eligijus Jankauskas (Sūduva) |
| Manager of the Year | Valdas Dambrauskas (Žalgiris) |
| Golden Boot | Andrija Kaluđerović (Žalgiris) |
| Goal of the Season | Matija Ljujić (Žalgiris) |
| Fair Play Award | Trakai |

=== Quarterly awards ===
Player of the Round
| Period | Player |
|---|---|
| First Round (1-7) | Nerijus Valskis (Trakai) |
| Second Round (8-14) | Marius Rapalis (Trakai) |
| Third Round (15-21) | Andrija Kaluđerović (Žalgiris) |
| Fourth Round (22-28) | Ovidijus Verbickas (Atlantas) |

Coach of the Round
| Period | Coach |
|---|---|
| First Round (1-7) | Valdas Urbonas (Trakai) |
| Second Round (8-14) | Aleksandar Veselinović (Sūduva) |
| Third Round (15-21) | Valdas Dambrauskas (Žalgiris) |
| Fourth Round (22-28) | Robertas Poškus (Lietava) |

=== "Golden Heart" initiative ===
From 2016 season A lyga together with Lithuanian Football Federation decided to expand project "Bring you hearts to the stadium" and honor players who played 10 or more times for the Lithuania national team with golden heart on their shirts.

In 2016 season these players have had this evaluation:

- FK Žalgiris — Egidijus Vaitkūnas, Saulius Mikoliūnas, Linas Pilibaitis, Marius Žaliūkas, Vytautas Lukša, Mantas Kuklys, Simonas Stankevičius
- FK Trakai — Deividas Česnauskis, Arūnas Klimavičius, Tadas Labukas, Nerijus Valskis
- FK Kauno Žalgiris — Andrius Velička, Ignas Dedura, Audrius Kšanavičius
- FK Sūduva — Tomas Radzinevičius, Vaidas Slavickas,
- FK Atlantas — Andrius Jokšas
- FK Lietava — Valdemaras Borovskis
- FK Utenis — Pavelas Leusas

=== Team of the Week ===
Team of the Week
| Week | Goalkeeper | Defender | Midfielder | Forward |
|---|---|---|---|---|
| 1 | (Australia) Ridley (Stumbras) | (Lithuania) Borovskis (Lietava) (Lithuania) Klimavičius (Žalgiris) (Serbia) Šušnjar (Lietava) (Netherlands) Slijngard (Žalgiris) | (Lithuania) Jankauskas (Utenis) (Lithuania) Galkevičius (Lietava) (Lithuania) Lukša (Žalgiris) (Lithuania) Papšys (Atlantas) | (Lithuania) Krušnauskas (Kauno Žalgiris) (Bosnia and Herzegovina) Atajić (Žalgiris) |
| 2 | (Lithuania) Kvedaras (Lietava) | (Lithuania) Slavickas (Sūduva) (Lithuania) Klimavičius (Trakai) (Serbia) Šušnjar (Lietava) (Serbia) Jablan (Sūduva) | (Lithuania) Dapkus (Trakai) (Lithuania) Galkevičius (Lietava) (Brazil) Elivelto (Žalgiris) (Lithuania) Paškevičius (Lietava) | (Lithuania) Valskis (Trakai) (Bosnia and Herzegovina) Atajić (Žalgiris) |
| 3 | (Ukraine) Myrnyi (Utenis) | (Lithuania) Borovskis (Lietava) (Lithuania) Gnedojus (Atlantas) (Croatia) Švrljuga (Sūduva) (Senegal) Mbodj (Žalgiris) | (Serbia) Pavlović (Sūduva) (Lithuania) Galkevičius (Lietava) (Lithuania) Papšys (Atlantas) (Lithuania) Valskis (Trakai) | (Lithuania) Laukžemis (Sūduva) (Armenia) Arshakyan (Trakai) |
| 4 | (Ukraine) Myrnyi (Utenis) | (Netherlands) Slijngard (Žalgiris) (Lithuania) Beneta (Atlantas) (Lithuania) Klimavičius (Trakai) (Lithuania) Dūda (Lietava) | (Belarus) Gurenko (Trakai) (Lithuania) Snapkauskas (Stumbras) (Brazil) Élton (Žalgiris) (Belarus) Bychanok (Trakai) | (Lithuania) Rimkevičius (Stumbras) (Lithuania) Valskis (Trakai) |
| 5 | (Lithuania) Rapalis (Trakai) | (Lithuania) Baravykas (Atlantas) (Lithuania) Artimavičius (Utenis) (Lithuania) Klimavičius (Trakai) (Lithuania) Čerkauskas (Stumbras) | (Russia) Maksimov (Atlantas) (Serbia) Kecap (Sūduva) (Russia) Mamaev (Trakai) (Bosnia and Herzegovina) Jamak (Sūduva) (Russia) Dmitriyev (Atlantas) | (Lithuania) Radzinevičius (Sūduva) |
| 6 | (Ukraine) Myrnyi (Utenis) | (Lithuania) Borovskis (Lietava) (Lithuania) Artimavičius (Utenis) (Lithuania) Česnauskis (Trakai) (Lithuania) Gnedojus (Atlantas) | (Russia) Maksimov (Atlantas) (Lithuania) Gvildys (Kauno Žalgiris) (Moldova) Zasavitchi (Trakai) (Lithuania) Jankauskas (Utenis) (Russia) Dmitriyev (Atlantas) | (Belarus) Rekish (Trakai) |
| 7 | (Ukraine) Myrnyi (Utenis) | (Lithuania) Klimavičius (Trakai) (Lithuania) Sadauskas (Stumbras) (Lithuania) Česnauskis (Trakai) (Costa Rica) Flores (Stumbras) | (Bosnia and Herzegovina) Jamak (Sūduva) (Lithuania) Armanavičius (Stumbras) (Serbia) Pavlović (Sūduva) (Lithuania) Pilibaitis (Žalgiris) (Lithuania) Valskis (Trakai) | (Bosnia and Herzegovina) Atajić (Žalgiris) |
| 8 | (Lithuania) Rapalis (Trakai) | (Lithuania) Zagurskas (Utenis) (Lithuania) Jankauskas (Sūduva) (Belarus) Kruk (Trakai) (Lithuania) Jeriomenka (Utenis) | (Lithuania) Chvedukas (Sūduva) (Belarus) Bychanok (Trakai) (Lithuania) Mastianica (Utenis) (Lithuania) Kazlauskas (Atlantas) (Belarus) Rekish (Trakai) | (Lithuania) Radzinevičius (Sūduva) |
| 9 | (Lithuania) Rapalis (Trakai) | (Lithuania) Borovskis (Lietava) (Lithuania) Jankauskas (Sūduva) (Lithuania) Gvildys (Kauno Žalgiris) (Lithuania) Vaitkūnas (Žalgiris) | (Lithuania) Kloniūnas (Kauno Žalgiris) (Lithuania) Paškevičius (Lietava) (Lithuania) Kuklys (Žalgiris) (Russia) Maksimov (Atlantas) (Lithuania) Lukša (Žalgiris) | (Lithuania) Radzinevičius (Sūduva) |
| 10 | (Russia) Sikorskiy (Stumbras) | (Lithuania) Gnedojus (Atlantas) (Lithuania) Jankauskas (Sūduva) (Lithuania) Sadauskas (Stumbras) | (Moldova) Zasavitchi (Trakai) (Lithuania) Paškevičius (Lietava) (Germany) Savio (Lietava) (Ghana) Basit (Stumbras) | (Netherlands) Sylla (Atlantas) (Lithuania) Radzinevičius (Sūduva) (Lithuania) Stonkus (Lietava) |
| 11 | (Lithuania) Mikelionis (Kauno Žalgiris) | (Lithuania) Gnedojus (Atlantas) (Lithuania) Baravykas (Atlantas) (Lithuania) Bareikis (Stumbras) | (Lithuania) Gvildys (Kauno Žalgiris) (Belarus) Gurenko (Trakai) (Lithuania) Lukša (Žalgiris) (Ghana) Basit (Stumbras) (Lithuania) Jankauskas (Utenis) | (Netherlands) Sylla (Atlantas) (Armenia) Arshakyan (Trakai) |
| 12 | (Lithuania) Kvedaras (Lietava) | (Lithuania) Beneta (Atlantas) (Lithuania) Klimavičius (Žalgiris) (Lithuania) Klimavičius (Trakai) (Costa Rica) Flores (Stumbras) | (Lithuania) Kuklys (Žalgiris) (Lithuania) Mačiulis (Stumbras) (Russia) Dmitriyev (Atlantas) | (Netherlands) Sylla (Atlantas) (Lithuania) Valskis (Trakai) (Brazil) Eduardo (Stumbras) |
| 13 | (Lithuania) Rapalis (Trakai) | (Lithuania) Beneta (Atlantas) (Netherlands) Slijngard (Žalgiris) (Lithuania) Klimavičius (Trakai) (Senegal) Mbodj (Žalgiris) | (Ghana) Basit (Stumbras) (Lithuania) Kuklys (Žalgiris) (Bosnia and Herzegovina) Jamak (Sūduva) (Lithuania) Mačiulis (Stumbras) (Belarus) Gurenko (Trakai) | (Italy) Russo (Stumbras) |
| 14 | (Lithuania) Vitkauskas (Žalgiris) | (Lithuania) Pilypas (Kauno Žalgiris) (Croatia) Švrljuga (Sūduva) (Lithuania) Borovskis (Lietava) | (Lithuania) Upstas (Stumbras) (Belarus) Gurenko (Trakai) (Lithuania) Kloniūnas (Kauno Žalgiris) (Serbia) Kecap (Sūduva) (Russia) Maksimov (Atlantas) | (Lithuania) Laukžemis (Sūduva) (Lithuania) Gedminas (Atlantas) |
| 15 | (Lithuania) Vitkauskas (Žalgiris) | (Lithuania) Freidgeimas (Utenis) (Lithuania) Beneta (Atlantas) (Senegal) Mbodj (Žalgiris) (Lithuania) Mastianica (Utenis) | (Lithuania) Salamanavičius (Sūduva) (Lithuania) Lukša (Žalgiris) (Serbia) Kecap (Sūduva) (Russia) Dmitriyev (Atlantas) | (Lithuania) Pilibaitis (Žalgiris) (Lithuania) Gedminas (Atlantas) |
| 16 | (Lithuania) Paukštė (Utenis) | (Lithuania) Vaitkūnas (Žalgiris) (Ukraine) Polyanskyi (Utenis) (Lithuania) Česnauskis (Trakai) | (Lithuania) Kuklys (Žalgiris) (Belarus) Gurenko (Trakai) (Russia) Dmitriyev (Atlantas) (Lithuania) Romanovskis (Utenis) (Lithuania) Pilibaitis (Žalgiris) | (Lithuania) Gedminas (Atlantas) (Lithuania) Radzinevičius (Sūduva) |
| 17^{α} | (Brazil) Broetto (Stumbras) | (Lithuania) Borovskis (Lietava) (Lithuania) Freidgeimas (Utenis) (Lithuania) Snapkauskas (Stumbras) | (Lithuania) Verbickas (Atlantas) (Lithuania) Eliošius (Lietava) (Russia) Dmitriyev (Atlantas) (Lithuania) Upstas (Stumbras) | (Lithuania) Velička (Kauno Žalgiris) (Lithuania) Stonkus (Lietava) (France) Kore (Stumbras) |
| 18 | (Lithuania) Kvedaras (Lietava) | (Lithuania) Slavickas (Sūduva) (Lithuania) Gašpuitis (Atlantas) (Lithuania) Gavrilovas (Kauno Žalgiris) (Lithuania) Činikas (Sūduva) | (Lithuania) Verbickas (Atlantas) (Lithuania) Pilibaitis (Žalgiris) (Lithuania) Masenzovas (Trakai) (Lithuania) Šilkaitis Kauno Žalgiris) | (Serbia) Kaluđerović (Žalgiris) (Lithuania) Radzinevičius (Sūduva) |
| 19 | (Lithuania) Stonys (Kauno Žalgiris) | (Senegal) Mbodj (Žalgiris) (Lithuania) Gvildys (Kauno Žalgiris) (Lithuania) Vaitkūnas (Žalgiris) | (Lithuania) Vėževičius (Stumbras) (Lithuania) Romanovskis (Utenis) (Lithuania) Kuklys (Žalgiris) (Belarus) Bychanok (Trakai) | (Serbia) Kaluđerović (Žalgiris) (Lithuania) Radzinevičius (Sūduva) (Armenia) Arshakyan (Trakai) |
| 20 | (Ukraine) Babenko (Lietava) | (Lithuania) Klimavičius (Žalgiris) (Russia) Kotov (Stumbras) (Lithuania) Vaitkūnas (Žalgiris) | (Lithuania) Eliošius (Lietava) (Lithuania) Snapkauskas (Stumbras) (Lithuania) Jankauskas (Sūduva) (Lithuania) Eliošius (Lietava) (Croatia) Blagojević (Žalgiris) | (Lithuania) Valskis (Trakai) (Serbia) Kaluđerović (Žalgiris) |
| 21 | (Lithuania) Plūkas (Trakai) | (Lithuania) Tručinskas (Utenis) (Lithuania) Sadauskas (Stumbras) (Lithuania) Klimavičius (Trakai) | (Lithuania) Janušauskas (Sūduva) (Belarus) Bychanok (Trakai) (Lithuania) Lukša (Žalgiris) (Belarus) Gurenko (Trakai) | (Ukraine) Vereshchak (Utenis) (Lithuania) Radzinevičius (Sūduva) (Bosnia and Herzegovina) Atajić (Žalgiris) |
| 22 | (Lithuania) Klevinskas (Žalgiris) | (Lithuania) Borovskis (Lietava) (Lithuania) Česnauskis (Trakai) (Lithuania) Dedura (Kauno Žalgiris) | (Lithuania) Eliošius (Lietava) (Lithuania) Bartkus (Atlantas) (Lithuania) Romanovskis (Utenis) (Lithuania) Kuklys (Žalgiris) (Lithuania) Jankauskas (Sūduva) | (Serbia) Kaluđerović (Žalgiris) (Lithuania) Valskis (Trakai) |
| 23 | Not declared | | | |
| 24 | (Lithuania) Kvedaras (Lietava) | (Lithuania) Jankauskas (Sūduva) (Nigeria) Wakili (Trakai) (Lithuania) Mikoliūnas (Žalgiris) (Lithuania) Žarskis (Lietava) | (Lithuania) Eliošius (Lietava) (Moldova) Zasavitchi (Trakai) (Lithuania) Upstas (Stumbras) (Belarus) Gurenko (Trakai) | (Ukraine) Vereshchak (Utenis) (Lithuania) Valskis (Trakai) |
| 25 | (Ukraine) Babenko (Lietava) | (Lithuania) Beneta (Atlantas) (Ukraine) Shyshka (Trakai) (Lithuania) Borovskis (Lietava) | (Belarus) Chukhley (Kauno Žalgiris) (Lithuania) Kuklys (Žalgiris) (Lithuania) Vėževičius (Stumbras) (Lithuania) Romanovskis (Utenis) (Moldova) Zasavitchi (Trakai) | (Lithuania) Velička (Kauno Žalgiris) (Lithuania) Valskis (Trakai) |
| 26 | (Lithuania) Mikelionis (Kauno Žalgiris) | (Netherlands) Slijngard (Žalgiris) (Ukraine) Shyshka (Trakai) (Lithuania) Dedura (Kauno Žalgiris) (Lithuania) Činikas (Sūduva) | (Lithuania) Janušauskas (Sūduva) (Lithuania) Mikoliūnas (Žalgiris) (Lithuania) Kazlauskas (Atlantas) (Bosnia and Herzegovina) Atajić (Žalgiris) (Lithuania) Verbickas (Atlantas) | (Lithuania) Labukas (Trakai) |
| 27 | (Lithuania) Kvedaras (Lietava) | (Lithuania) Jankauskas (Sūduva) (Lithuania) Utyra (Lietava) (Lithuania) Gnedojus (Atlantas) (Lithuania) Zagurskas (Utenis) | (Lithuania) Salamanavičius (Sūduva) (Russia) Maksimov (Atlantas) (Lithuania) Verbickas (Atlantas) (Lithuania) Janušauskas (Sūduva) | (Italy) Russo (Stumbras) (Lithuania) Eliošius (Lietava) |
| 28 | (Brazil) Broetto (Stumbras) | (Lithuania) Klimavičius (Trakai) (Netherlands) Slijngard (Žalgiris) (Lithuania) Česnauskis (Trakai) | (Lithuania) Mikoliūnas (Žalgiris) (Bosnia and Herzegovina) Jamak (Sūduva) (Lithuania) Vėževičius (Stumbras) (Serbia) Ljujić (Žalgiris) (Lithuania) Veliulis (Sūduva) | (Brazil) Cristian Alex (Stumbras) (Lithuania) Velička (Kauno Žalgiris) |
| 29 | (Lithuania) Valinčius (Atlantas) | (Nigeria) Wakili (Trakai) (Lithuania) Vaitkūnas (Žalgiris) (Croatia) Švrljuga (Sūduva) | (Lithuania) Janušauskas (Sūduva) (Lithuania) Kazlauskas (Atlantas) (Serbia) Pavlović (Sūduva) (Serbia) Ljujić (Žalgiris) (Lithuania) Veliulis (Sūduva) | (Serbia) Kaluđerović (Žalgiris) (Lithuania) Valskis (Trakai) |
| 30 | (Croatia) Kardum (Sūduva) | (Lithuania) Sadauskas (Stumbras) (Lithuania) Činikas (Sūduva) (Netherlands) Slijngard (Žalgiris) | (Ghana) Basit (Stumbras) (Lithuania) Kuklys (Žalgiris) (Liberia) Dorley (Trakai) (Lithuania) Vėževičius (Stumbras) (Ukraine) Poruchynskyy (Utenis) (Lithuania) Galkevičius (Lietava) | (Lithuania) Konikas (Stumbras) |
| 31 | (Brazil) Broetto (Stumbras) | (Lithuania) Klimavičius (Trakai) (Senegal) Mbodj (Žalgiris) (Lithuania) Baravykas (Atlantas) | (Ghana) Basit (Stumbras) (Lithuania) Kuklys (Žalgiris) (Lithuania) Verbickas (Atlantas) (France) Kore (Stumbras) (Croatia) Blagojević (Žalgiris) | (Lithuania) Valskis (Trakai) (Serbia) Kaluđerović (Žalgiris) |
| 32 | (Croatia) Kardum (Sūduva) | (Lithuania) Klimavičius (Trakai) (Portugal) Nazaré (Stumbras) (Croatia) Švrljuga (Sūduva) | (Lithuania) Papšys (Atlantas) (Bosnia and Herzegovina) Jamak (Sūduva) (Liberia) Dorley (Trakai) (Lithuania) Veliulis (Sūduva) (Lithuania) Armanavičius (Stumbras) | (Lithuania) Labukas (Trakai) (Serbia) Kaluđerović (Žalgiris) |

Team of the Week Appearances
| Rank | Player | Club | Appearances |
|---|---|---|---|
| 1 | (Lithuania) Nerijus Valskis | Trakai | 11 |
| 2 | (Lithuania) Arūnas Klimavičius | Trakai | 10 |
| 3 | (Lithuania) Mantas Kuklys | Žalgiris | 9 |
| 4 | (Lithuania) Tomas Radzinevičius | Sūduva | 8 |
| 4 | (Lithuania) Valdemaras Borovskis | Lietava | 8 |
| 6 | (Belarus) Artem Gurenko | Trakai | 7 |
| 6 | (Serbia) Andrija Kaluđerović | Žalgiris | 7 |
| 8 | (Russia) Oleg Dmitriyev | Atlantas | 6 |
| 8 | (Netherlands) Donovan Slijngard | Žalgiris | 6 |
| 10 | (Lithuania) Vytautas Lukša | Žalgiris | 5 |
| 10 | (Lithuania) Eligijus Jankauskas | Utenis/Sūduva | 5 |
| 10 | (Lithuania) Markas Beneta | Atlantas | 5 |
| 10 | (Bosnia and Herzegovina) Bahrudin Atajić | Žalgiris | 5 |
| 10 | (Lithuania) Kazimeras Gnedojus | Atlantas | 5 |
| 10 | (Russia) Maksim Maksimov | Atlantas | 5 |
| 10 | (Lithuania) Algis Jankauskas | Sūduva | 5 |
| 10 | (Lithuania) Giedrius Kvedaras | Lietava | 5 |
| 10 | (Lithuania) Deividas Česnauskis | Trakai | 5 |
| 10 | (Lithuania) Egidijus Vaitkūnas | Žalgiris | 5 |
| 10 | (Senegal) Mamadou Mbodj | Žalgiris | 5 |
| 10 | (Lithuania) Ovidijus Verbickas | Atlantas | 5 |
| 10 | (Ghana) Abdul Basit | Stumbras | 5 |
| 10 | (Bosnia and Herzegovina) Nermin Jamak | Sūduva | 5 |
| 24 | 12 players tied | | 4 |
| 36 | 19 players tied | | 3 |
| 55 | 28 players tied | | 2 |
| 83 | 38 players tied | | 1 |
