= List of Lithuanian football transfers summer 2017 =

This is a list of transfers in Lithuanian football for the 2017 summer transfer window. Only confirmed moves featuring an A Lyga side are listed.

The winter transfer window opens on June 23, 2017, and will close on July 23, 2017. Deals may be signed at any given moment in the season, but the actual transfer may only take place during the transfer window. Unattached players may sign at any moment.

== Transfers In ==
Date	Name	Moving from	Moving to	Type	Source
30 May 2017	(Lithuania) Rimvydas Sadauskas	(Republic of Ireland) Cork City	Stumbras	End of loan spell	
15 June 2017	(Moldova) David Andronic	(Moldova) Speranța Nisporeni	Atlantas	Free	
15 June 2017	(Lithuania) Tadas Labukas	Trakai	Atlantas	Free	
15 June 2017	(Lithuania) Dovydas Virkšas	(France) Saint-Étienne	Atlantas	Undisclosed	
16 June 2017	(Ivory Coast) Eric Kassi	(Qatar) Al-Shamal	Stumbras	Free	
20 June 2017	(Romania) Liviu Antal	(Romania) CFR Cluj	Žalgiris	Free	
23 June 2017	(Lithuania) Mantas Fridrikas	DFK Dainava	Atlantas	Undisclosed	
24 June 2017	(Lithuania) Simonas Juška	Palanga	Atlantas	End of loan spell	
24 June 2017	(Lithuania) Skirmantas Rakauskas	Džiugas	Atlantas	End of loan spell	
26 June 2017	(Ukraine) Kyrylo Silich	DFK Dainava	Jonava	Undisclosed	
30 June 2017	(Bosnia and Herzegovina) Semir Kerla	(Bosnia and Herzegovina) Željezničar	Sūduva	Free	
1 July 2017	(Chile) Diego Oyarzún	(Chile) Palestino	Žalgiris	Free	
1 July 2017	(Georgia (country)) Vako Bachiashvili	(Latvia) Liepāja	Kauno Žalgiris	Free	
7 July 2017	(Brazil) Lucas Villela	(Brazil) Social	Stumbras	Free	
9 July 2017	(Lithuania) Džiugas Bartkus	(Malta) Valletta	Žalgiris	Free	
11 July 2017	(Serbia) Nemanja Bjelan	Kauno Žalgiris	Stumbras	Undisclosed	
12 July 2017	(Lithuania) Karolis Chvedukas	(Poland) Chojniczanka Chojnice	Sūduva	Free	
14 July 2017	(Lithuania) Tadas Simaitis	(Azerbaijan) Kapaz	Jonava	Free	
14 July 2017	(Moldova) Petru Leucă	(Moldova) Ungheni	Jonava	Free	
14 July 2017	(Lithuania) Daniel Romanovskij	Stumbras	Žalgiris	End of loan spell	
15 July 2017	(Lithuania) Dominykas Galkevičius	Sūduva	Stumbras	Free	
15 July 2017	(Lithuania) Pijus Širvys	Šilutė	Kauno Žalgiris	Free	
15 July 2017	(Lithuania) Mindaugas Grigaravičius	(Latvia) Jelgava	Jonava	Loan	
17 July 2017	(Lithuania) Mantas Adomėnas	Trakai	Stumbras	Undisclosed	
17 July 2017	(Lithuania) Rokas Rasimavičius	Panevėžys Football Academy	Stumbras	Free	
19 July 2017	(Croatia) Luka Perić	(Latvia) RFS	Jonava	Free	
19 July 2017	(Russia) Artjoms Osipovs	(Latvia) Liepāja	Jonava	Free	
19 July 2017	(Ukraine) Maksym Zinatullin	(Ukraine) Olimpik Donetsk	Stumbras	Free	
20 July 2017	(Lithuania) Lukas Kochanauskas	Trakai	Kauno Žalgiris	Free	
20 July 2017	(South Africa) Jaisen Clifford	(Malta) Mqabba	Stumbras	Free	
21 July 2017	(Belarus) Mikhail Kolyadko	(Belarus) Gorodeya	Atlantas	Free	
21 July 2017	(Belarus) Illya Kalpachuk	(Belarus) Gorodeya	Atlantas	Free	
21 July 2017	(Belarus) Dzmitry Mazalewski	(Belarus) Dinamo Brest	Atlantas	Free	
21 July 2017	(Belarus) Maksim Chizh	(Belarus) Dinamo Brest	Atlantas	Loan	
21 July 2017	(Belarus) Dmitry German	(Belarus) Dinamo Brest	Atlantas	Loan	
21 July 2017	(Serbia) Nemanja Ivanov	(North Macedonia) Sileks	Atlantas	Free	
21 July 2017	(Lithuania) Klimas Gusočenko	(Poland) Wisła Puławy	Kauno Žalgiris	Free	
21 July 2017	(Lithuania) Edvinas Baniulis	Utenis	Kauno Žalgiris	Loan	
22 July 2017	(Lithuania) Aurimas Tručinskas	Utenis	Jonava	Free	
22 July 2017	(Ukraine) Maksym Zhychykov	(Ukraine) Shakhtar Donetsk	Jonava	Free	
1 August 2017	(Moldova) Boris Pascarenco	(Slovakia) Rimavská Sobota	Kauno Žalgiris	Undisclosed	
1 August 2017	(Lithuania) Gratas Sirgėdas	(Germany) FC Amberg	Kauno Žalgiris	Free	
1 August 2017	(Lithuania) Povilas Malinauskas	Trakai	Kauno Žalgiris	Free	

== Transfers Out ==
Date	Name	Moving from	Moving to	Type	Source
26 May 2017	(Belarus) Artem Gurenko	Sūduva	Free Market	Released	
26 May 2017	(Ghana) Benjamin Boateng	Stumbras	Free Market	Released	
27 May 2017	(Lithuania) Marius Papšys	Stumbras	Free Market	Released	
7 June 2017	(Belarus) Andrey Chukhley	Jonava	Free Market	Released	
8 June 2017	(Latvia) Vitalijs Barinovs	Jonava	Free Market	Released	
15 June 2017	(Lithuania) Georgas Freidgeimas	Žalgiris	(Kazakhstan) Okzhetpes	Undisclosed	
15 June 2017	(Lithuania) Ainas Bareikis	Stumbras	Free Market	Released	
15 June 2017	(Portugal) Diogo David	Stumbras	Free Market	Released	
19 June 2017	(Lithuania) Ignas Driomovas	Stumbras	Free Market	Released	
26 June 2017	(Poland) Karol Salik	Jonava	Free Market	Released	
27 June 2017	(Georgia (country)) Davit Makaradze	Jonava	Free Market	Released	
28 June 2017	(Lithuania) Lukas Sendžikas	Kauno Žalgiris	DFK Dainava	Free	
30 June 2017	(Denmark) Casper Bruun	Utenis	Free Market	Released	
30 June 2017	(Ukraine) Mykola Vechurko	Utenis	Free Market	Released	
30 June 2017	(Japan) Takuya Matsunaga	Utenis	Free Market	Released	
30 June 2017	(Belarus) Alyaksandr Kuhan	Utenis	Free Market	Released	
30 June 2017	(Sweden) Dejan Garača	Utenis	Free Market	Released	
30 June 2017	(Slovenia) Rok Štraus	Utenis	Free Market	Released	
30 June 2017	(Lithuania) Gabrielius Zagurskas	Utenis	Free Market	Released	
30 June 2017	(Lithuania) Pavelas Leusas	Utenis	Free Market	Released	
30 June 2017	(Serbia) Komnen Andrić	Žalgiris	(Portugal) Belenenses	End of loan spell	
1 July 2017	(Lithuania) Martynas Vasiliauskas	Kauno Žalgiris	Nevėžis	Free	
1 July 2017	(Lithuania) Arnoldas Trakšelis	Kauno Žalgiris	Nevėžis	Free	
8 July 2017	(Lithuania) Saulius Klevinskas	Žalgiris	Free Market	Released	
10 July 2017	(Canada) Stefan Cebara	Utenis	(Serbia) Vojvodina	Free	
9 July 2017	(Ghana) Benjamin Terry	Stumbras	Free Market	Released	
9 July 2017	(Ghana) Dennis Nyarko	Stumbras	Free Market	Released	
9 July 2017	(Brazil) Marcelo Muniz	Stumbras	Free Market	Released	
9 July 2017	(Portugal) André Silva	Stumbras	Free Market	Released	
9 July 2017	(Lithuania) Erikas Skripkinas	Stumbras	Free Market	Released	
13 July 2017	(Lithuania) Julius Aleksandravičius	Jonava	Free Market	Released	
27 July 2017	(Lithuania) Rokas Krušnauskas	Kauno Žalgiris	Banga	Free	

== Trials ==
Only following cases apply to this category:

- Player was on trial in A Lyga club, but haven't joined any club of the league;
- Player from the league was away in any other club for a trial, but wasn't sold, loaned out or released to another club in this transfer window.

Date	Name	Moving from	Moving to	Type	Source
14 June 2017	(Russia) Sergei Obivalin	Atlantas	(Russia) Rostov	Trial	
14 June 2017	(Russia) Oleg Dmitriyev	Atlantas	(Russia) Baltika Kaliningrad	Trial	
15 June 2017	(Russia) Andrei Panyukov	Atlantas	(Russia) Zenit Saint Petersburg	Trial	
21 June 2017	(Lithuania) Marius Papšys	Stumbras	(Romania) Sepsi Sfântu Gheorghe	Trial	
22 June 2017	(United Kingdom) Sam Shaban	DFK Dainava	Atlantas	Trial	
28 June 2017	(Lithuania) Linas Pilibaitis	Atlantas	(Romania) Sepsi Sfântu Gheorghe	Trial	
7 July 2017	(Lithuania) Donatas Konikas	Stumbras	(France) Girondins de Bordeaux	Trial	
7 July 2017	(Lithuania) Vilius Armalas	Stumbras	(France) Girondins de Bordeaux	Trial	
12 July 2017	(Lithuania) Erikas Skripkinas	Stumbras	Jonava	Trial	
12 July 2017	(Lithuania) Ernestas Stočkūnas	Žalgiris	Jonava	Trial	
17 July 2017	(Lithuania) Gabrielius Zagurskas	Utenis	Atlantas	Trial	

== Staff ==
Date	Name	Position	Moving from	Moving to	Source
26 May 2017	(North Macedonia) Toni Jakimovski	Assistant Coach	Utenis	Free Market	
26 May 2017	(Spain) Carlos Pérez	Assistant Coach	(Spain) Burladés	Utenis	
1 June 2017	(Lithuania) Vaidotas Rastenis	Head of Youth Development	Free Market	Utenis	
15 June 2017	(Lithuania) Arnas Lekevičius	Director of Football	Free Market	Atlantas	
15 June 2017	(Lithuania) Olegas Miscenko	Head Doctor	Atlantas	Free Market	
15 June 2017	(Lithuania) Sigitas Ūselis	Head Doctor	Free Market	Atlantas	
16 June 2017	(Lithuania) Marijus Stankevičius	Chairman	Jonava	Free Market	
16 June 2017	(Lithuania) Rita Bagdonienė	Chairwoman	Free Market	Jonava	
16 June 2017	(Lithuania) Aurimas Šalūga	Administrator	Free Market	Jonava	
27 June 2017	(Ukraine) Oleh Boychyshyn	Director of Sport	Utenis	Free Market	
21 July 2017	(Lithuania) Rimantas Žvingilas	Head coach (caretaker)	Atlantas	Free Market	
21 July 2017	(Russia) Sergei Savchenkov	Head coach (caretaker)	Atlantas	Free Market	
21 July 2017	(Russia) Vladimir Tunkin	Assistant Coach	Atlantas	Free Market	
21 July 2017	(Russia) Anton Savchenkov	Goalkeeping Coach	Atlantas	Free Market	
21 July 2017	(Northern Ireland) Johnny McKinstry	Head coach	Rwanda national team	Kauno Žalgiris	
21 July 2017	(United Kingdom) Alexander McCarthy	Assistant Coach	Free Market	Kauno Žalgiris	
23 July 2017	(Lithuania) Igoris Pankratjevas	Head coach	Panerys	Atlantas	
23 July 2017	(Lithuania) Algimantas Briaunys	Assistant Coach	Tauras	Atlantas	
