= Abdoul Karim Sylla =

Abdoul Karim Sylla may refer to:

- Abdoul Karim Sylla (footballer, born 1981), Guinean footballer
- Abdoul Karim Sylla (footballer, born 1992), Guinean-Dutch footballer
