= Benjamin Terry =

Benjamin Terry may refer to:

- Benjamin Franklin Terry (1821–1861), raised and commanded the 8th Texas Cavalry Regiment, popularly known as Terry's Texas Rangers
- Benjamin Terry (footballer) (born 1994), Ghanaian footballer
