= Cristian Alex =

Brazilian footballer (born 1993)

Personal information
- Full name: Cristian Alex da Silva Santos
- Date of birth: 1 December 1993 (age 32)
- Place of birth: Mendes, Rio de Janeiro, Brazil
- Height: 1.89 m (6 ft 2 in)
- Position: Forward

Youth career
- 2008: Audax
- 2008–2012: Cruzeiro

Senior career*
Years	Team	Apps	(Gls)
2013–2015	Phuket	40	(18)
2015	Marítimo B	2	(0)
2015	Marítimo	3	(0)
2015	RB Bragantino	1	(0)
2016	Atlético Sorocaba	0	(0)
2016	Stumbras	13	(4)
2017	FC Gifu	8	(3)
2018	Chiangmai	0	(0)
2018	Chiangmai United	0	(0)
2019	Khonkaen	9	(3)
2020	Songkhla	4	(0)
2021	Visakha	5	(2)
2022	Sisaket United	4	(2)
2023	Kasetsart	14	(6)
2023–2024	Pattaya United	16	(4)
2024	Kanchanaburi Power	14	(3)
2025–2026	PSPS Pekanbaru	11	(3)
- * Club domestic league appearances and goals as of 10 January 2026

Cristian Alex da Silva Santos (born 1 December 1993) is a Brazilian professional footballer who plays as a forward.

== Club career ==
Having started his career with Cruzeiro, Cristian joined Thai side Phuket in 2013, following an agreement between the two clubs. After an impressive 18 goals in 40 games, he transferred to Portuguese side Marítimo in early 2015. He failed to impress during his time with the Primeira Liga side, and left the same year to return to Brazil. He played for Bragantino for one game, before being offered a contract with Turkish side Boluspor.

He did not accept the contract offer with the TFF First League side, and instead joined another Brazilian team, Sorocaba, ahead of the 2016 Paulista A2.

After a short spell with Lithuanian side Stumbras, Cristian joined Japanese side FC Gifu in early 2017.

On 13 August 2025, Indonesian Championship club PSPS Pekanbaru announced the signing of Alex.

== Career statistics ==
=== Club ===
As of 4 June 2023.

Club	Season	League			State League		Cup		Other		Total	
Club	Season	Division	Apps	Goals	Apps	Goals	Apps	Goals	Apps	Goals	Apps	Goals
Marítimo B	2014–15	Segunda Liga	2	0	–		0	0	0	0	2	0
Marítimo	2014–15	Primeira Liga	3	0	–		0	0	0	0	3	0
Bragantino	2015	Série B	1	0	0	0	0	0	0	0	1	0
Sorocaba	2016	–			6 (Note: Appearances in the Campeonato Paulista A2)	0	0	0	0	0	6	0
Stumbras	2016	A Lyga	13	4	–		2 (Note: Appearances in the Lithuanian Cup)	0	0	0	15	4
Gifu	2017	J2 League	8	3	–		1 (Note: Appearances in the Emperor's Cup)	0	0	0	9	3
Chiangmai	2018	Thai League 2	8	3	–		0	0	0	0	8	3
Career total			35	10	6	0	3	0	0	0	44	10
