= Hurenko =

Hurenko (Ukrainian: Гуренко), Hurenka (Belarusian: Гурэнка), also transliterated Gurenko, is a surname. Notable people with the surname include:

- Artem Gurenko (born 1994), Belarusian footballer
- Sergei Gurenko (born 1972), Belarusian football coach
- Stanislav Hurenko (1936–2013), Soviet-Ukrainian politician
