= Deividas Česnauskis =

Lithuanian footballer (born 1981)

Personal information
- Full name: Deividas R. Česnauskis
- Date of birth: 30 June 1981 (age 45)
- Place of birth: Kuršėnai, Lithuanian SSR, Soviet Union
- Height: 1.81 m (5 ft 11 in)
- Position: Right winger

Senior career*
Years	Team	Apps	(Gls)
1997–2000	Ekranas Panevėžys	54	(6)
2000–2003	Dynamo Moscow	69	(5)
2003–2004	Lokomotiv Moscow	10	(0)
2004–2005	FBK Kaunas	0	(0)
2005–2009	Heart of Midlothian	86	(5)
2009–2010	Ergotelis	24	(2)
2010–2012	Aris	9	(0)
2012–2014	FC Baku	57	(8)
2014–2018	FK Trakai	103	(5)
Total		422	(32)

International career
2000–2003	Lithuania U21	8	(0)
2001–2018	Lithuania	63	(4)
- * Club domestic league appearances and goals

Deividas Česnauskis (born 30 June 1981) is a Lithuanian former professional footballer who played as a winger. He made 63 FIFA-official appearances for the Lithuanian national team scoring four goals.

== Club career ==
=== Early career ===
Česnauskis was born in Kuršėnai, Lithuanian SSR. He started his career as a teenage prodigy with Ekranas Panevėžys.

=== In Russia ===
Česnauskis earned a move to the Russian Premier League before his nineteenth birthday, when he joined Dynamo Moscow in 2000. In three years playing for Dynamo, he earned 80 caps across all competitions and scored six goals for the club. Česnauskis then joined city rivals Lokomotiv Moscow for the 2004 Russian Premier League. At the end of the season, he won the Russian championship title with Lokomotiv.

=== Heart of Midlothian ===
Česnauskis agreed a transfer to Scotland with Heart of Midlothian in 2005. The terms of this deal involved him signing for FBK Kaunas and being immediately loaned to the Edinburgh side for three seasons. He made his Hearts debut against Kilmarnock in the Scottish Cup, scoring the final goal in a 3–1 victory. His second goal for Hearts also came in the Scottish Cup, but it did not prevent his team for losing against Celtic in the semi-final.

In his second season at Hearts he helped the team to win the Scottish Cup by scoring the winning goal in a quarter-final 2–1 win against Partick Thistle. In the same match where Roman Bednar got sent off for diving in the second-half 15 minutes after coming on as a sub. In the final Česnauskis conceded a penalty from which Gretna were able to equalise and make it 1-1. However Hearts went on to win the match on penalties.

Since November 2006, Česnauskis did not play for Hearts over a year due to injuries or simply not being picked, and only played two matches for the Lithuanian national team. He finally made his comeback for Hearts in January 2008 in an away match against Dundee United, and soon after was voted Man of the match in his return to Tynecastle in a 1–1 draw against Kilmarnock. He scored his fourth Hearts goal, and his fourth in the Scottish Cup, against Motherwell on 12 January 2008. He scored his first league goal for Hearts in a 2–1 defeat to Falkirk on 5 May 2008.

On 26 February 2009, Česnauskis said he would leave Hearts in the summer unless he was given first team football before the end of the season, having started just two matches. On 27 April, it was confirmed with immediate effect that Česnauskis and his fellow Lithuanian teammate Saulius Mikoliūnas, left Hearts.

=== In Greece ===
On 9 June 2009, Česnauskis signed a two-year contract with Ergotelis After one season at the club from Heraklion, he signed a three-year contract with another Greek club, Aris, on 7 June 2010.

=== FC Baku ===
In June 2011 Česnauskis signed a two-year contract with Azerbaijan Premier League side FC Baku. In 2012, he won the Azerbaijan Cup with his team. Česnauskis was released by FC Baku at the end of the 2012–13 season after scoring eight goals in 52 appearances for the club. However, on 1 July 2013, Česnauskis signed a new contract with Baku.

=== FK Trakai ===
In 2014, he moved back to his home country and joined FK Trakai. With Trakai, he finished runners-up in the 2015 and 2016 A Lyga seasons and reached the final of the Lithuanian Football Cup in 2016, in which his team lost 0–1 against FK Žalgiris after extra time. At the end of the 2018 season, he retired from professional football.

== International career ==
Česnauskis made eight appearances for the Lithuanian under-21 side. He made his debut for the full national team aged 20, on 4 July 2001 against Estonia.

Until 2016, he earned 56 caps for his country, scoring four goals.

== Post-retirement ==
In November 2018, Lithuanian first division team FK Žalgiris announced Česnauskis as their new sporting director, alongside fellow former Lithuanian national Deividas Šemberas. In January 2020, the club announced that the contract with Česnauskis has been terminated by mutual consent.

Since 2021, he has worked as a football agent and has his own agency called DC7 Agency.

== Personal life ==
His younger brother, Edgaras, is also a former professional footballer.

== Career statistics ==
=== Club ===
As of match played 17 May 2014

Appearances and goals by club, season and competition
Club	Season	League			National cup		League cup		Continental		Total	
Club	Season	Division	Apps	Goals	Apps	Goals	Apps	Goals	Apps	Goals	Apps	Goals
FK Ekranas	1997–98	A Lyga	4	0			–		–		4	0
FK Ekranas	1998–99	A Lyga	23	3			–				23	3
FK Ekranas	1999	A Lyga	21	3			–				21	3
FK Ekranas	2000	A Lyga	18	1			–		–		18	1
FK Ekranas	Total		66	7			–				66	7
Dynamo Moscow	2000	Russian Premier League	9	0		0	–		2	0	11	0
Dynamo Moscow	2001	Russian Premier League	4	0		0	–		4	0	8	0
Dynamo Moscow	2002	Russian Premier League	28	1		0	–		–		28	1
Dynamo Moscow	2003	Russian Premier League	28	4		0	–		–		28	4
Dynamo Moscow	Total		77	5		0	–		6	0	83	5
Lokomotiv Moscow	2004	Russian Premier League	8	0		1	–		–			
Heart of Midlothian	2004–05	Scottish Premier League	8	0	3	2	0	0	–		11	2
Heart of Midlothian	2005–06	Scottish Premier League	25	0	4	1	2	0	–		31	1
Heart of Midlothian	2006–07	Scottish Premier League	9	0	0	0	0	0	5	0	14	0
Heart of Midlothian	2007–08	Scottish Premier League	13	1	2	1	0	0	–		15	2
Heart of Midlothian	2008–09	Scottish Premier League	13	0	1	0	1	0	–		17	0
Heart of Midlothian	Total		68	1	9	4	3	0	5	0	86	5
Ergotelis	2009–10	Super League Greece	22	2			–		–		22	2
Aris	2010–11	Super League Greece	9	0			–		6	0	15	0
Baku	2011–12	Azerbaijan Premier League	25	7	4	1	–		–		29	8
Baku	2012–13	Azerbaijan Premier League	17	0	4	0	–		2	0	23	0
Baku	2013–14	Azerbaijan Premier League	15	1	0	0	–		–		15	1
Baku	Total		57	8	8	1	–		2	0	67	9
Career total			299	23	17	6	3	0	19	0	338	29

=== International ===
Scores and results list Lithuania's goal tally first, score column indicates score after each Česnauskis goal.

List of international goals scored by Deividas Česnauskis
No.	Date	Venue	Opponent	Score	Result	Competition
1	4 July 2001	Latvijas Universitates Stadions, Riga, Latvia	Estonia	2–2	5–2	2001 Baltic Cup
2	3 July 2003	Keskstaadion, Valga, Estonia	Estonia	2–0	5–1	2003 Baltic Cup
3	17 November 2004	Stadio Olimpico, Serravalle, San Marino	San Marino	1–0	1–0	2006 FIFA World Cup qualification
4	17 August 2005	Vėtra Stadium, Vilnius, Lithuania	Belarus	1–0	1–0	Friendly

== Honours ==
Lokomotiv Moscow

- Russian Premier League: 2004

Heart of Midlothian

- Scottish Cup: 2005–06

Baku

- Azerbaijan Cup: 2011–12
