= Donovan Slijngard =

Dutch footballer (born 1987)

Personal information
- Full name: Donovan Carlos Saverio Slijngard
- Date of birth: 28 August 1987 (age 39)
- Place of birth: Amsterdam, Netherlands
- Height: 1.74 m (5 ft 9 in)
- Position: Left-back

Youth career
- –1998: Cobu Boys Amersfoort
- 1998–2006: Ajax

Senior career*
Years	Team	Apps	(Gls)
2006–2009	Ajax	0	(0)
2007	→ Groningen (loan)	2	(0)
2008–2009	→ Sparta Rotterdam (loan)	24	(0)
2009–2014	Sparta Rotterdam	140	(2)
2014–2015	Cambuur	2	(0)
2015–2021	Žalgiris Vilnius	144	(2)
2021–2023	Noordwijk	59	(0)
Total		371	(4)
- * Club domestic league appearances and goals

Donovan Carlos Saverio Slijngard (born 28 August 1987), simply known as Donovan Slijngard (Dutch pronunciation: [ˈslɛiŋɣɑrt]), is a Dutch former professional footballer who played as a left-back.

== Career ==
=== Ajax ===
Slijngard was born in Amsterdam and came through the Ajax youth ranks. In 2006, he was named AFC Ajax "Talent of the Future". He made his debut in professional football in the 2006–07 season where he played on loan for FC Groningen, while still under contract with Ajax. He made his debut for the senior squad of Ajax in the play-off game against FC Twente which finished 0–0. For the 2008–09 season, he was added to the first squad by manager Marco van Basten.

=== Sparta Rotterdam ===
After the 2008–09 season he left Ajax on a free transfer and signed a three-year contract with the club where he had already played on loan during the previous season, Sparta Rotterdam. Slijngard totally spent six seasons with the club after which he decided not to extend his expiring contract

=== Cambuur ===
On 28 August 2014, it was announced that Slijngard had joined SC Cambuur as an amateur. He will be in the running for a contract after he will be totally fit again.

=== Žalgiris Vilnius ===
On 11 July 2015, it was announced that Slijngard had joined Žalgiris Vilnius.

=== Later career ===
Slijngard returned to the Netherlands in 2021, joining amateur club VV Noordwijk. However, due to recurring injuries, he was forced to retire from football in September 2023.

== Personal life ==
Born in the Netherlands, Slijngard is of Surinamese descent.

== Honours ==
Žalgiris

- A Lyga: 2015, 2016, 2020
- Lithuanian Cup: 2015–16, 2016
- Lithuanian Supercup: 2016, 2017, 2020

Individual

- AFC Ajax Talent of the Future: 2006
- A Lyga Team of the Year: 2018
