= Yehor Kondratyuk =

Ukrainian footballer (born 2000)

Personal information
- Full name: Yehor Valeriyovych Kondratyuk
- Date of birth: 3 August 2000 (age 26)
- Place of birth: Odesa, Ukraine
- Height: 1.81 m (5 ft 11 in)
- Position: Forward

Team information
- Current team: Kokand 1912
- Number: 69

Senior career*
Years	Team	Apps	(Gls)
2019	Stumbras	2	(0)
2020–2022	Dinamo-Auto Tiraspol	35	(3)
2023–2024	Tytan Odesa		
2024–	Kokand 1912	31	(4)
- * Club domestic league appearances and goals as of 11 August 2025 ‡ National team caps and goals as of 17 November 2020

Yehor Valeriyovych Kondratyuk (Ukrainian: Єгор Валерійович Кондратюк; born 3 August 2000) is a Ukrainian professional footballer who plays as a forward for Kokand 1912.

== Club career ==
In the 2018 season, Kondratyuk came to Uzbekistan and studied at the academy of the Qarshi-based team Nasaf. In the 2019 season, he joined the Lithuanian club Stumbras, which folded mid-season. After playing half a season in Lithuania, he returned to Qarshi and continued his career in the under-21 team of Nasaf.

In the 2020 season, Kondratyuk joined the Moldovan team Dinamo-Auto Tiraspol. He played 40 games and scored 3 goals over two seasons. He left the Tiraspol club in the 2022 season and was without a team for a while. In the 2023 season, he joined the football club Tytan Odesa, a team participating in the Ukrainian lower league. After playing for the Odesa team for one season, he moved to Kokand 1912 in the 2024 summer transfer window.
