= Saulius Mikoliūnas =

Lithuanian footballer (born 1984)

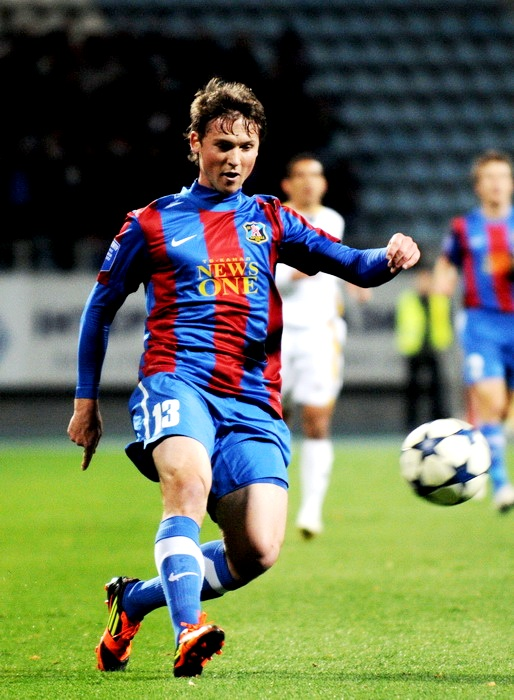
- Mikoliūnas playing for Arsenal Kyiv in 2011

Personal information
- Date of birth: 2 May 1984 (age 42)
- Place of birth: Vilnius, Lithuanian SSR, Soviet Union
- Height: 1.79 m (5 ft 10 in)
- Position: Right winger

Senior career*
Years	Team	Apps	(Gls)
2002–2003	Šviesa Vilnius	13	(1)
2003	Ekranas	16	(0)
2004–2009	FBK Kaunas	23	(0)
2005–2009	→ Heart of Midlothian (loan)	102	(11)
2009–2012	Arsenal Kyiv	78	(6)
2013–2014	Sevastopol	16	(0)
2014–2015	Shakhtyor Soligorsk	32	(4)
2016–2023	Žalgiris	162	(11)
Total		442	(33)

International career
2003–2006	Lithuania U21	7	(0)
2004–2022	Lithuania	101	(5)
- * Club domestic league appearances and goals

Saulius Mikoliūnas (born 2 May 1984) is a Lithuanian former professional footballer who played as a right winger. He has previously played for Scottish Premier League side Heart of Midlothian and Ukrainian Premier League club Arsenal Kyiv, among others. With 101 caps, Mikoliūnas is the Lithuania national team's second-most capped player.

Mikoliūnas was a right-sided winger who sometimes played in the right-back position.

== Club career ==
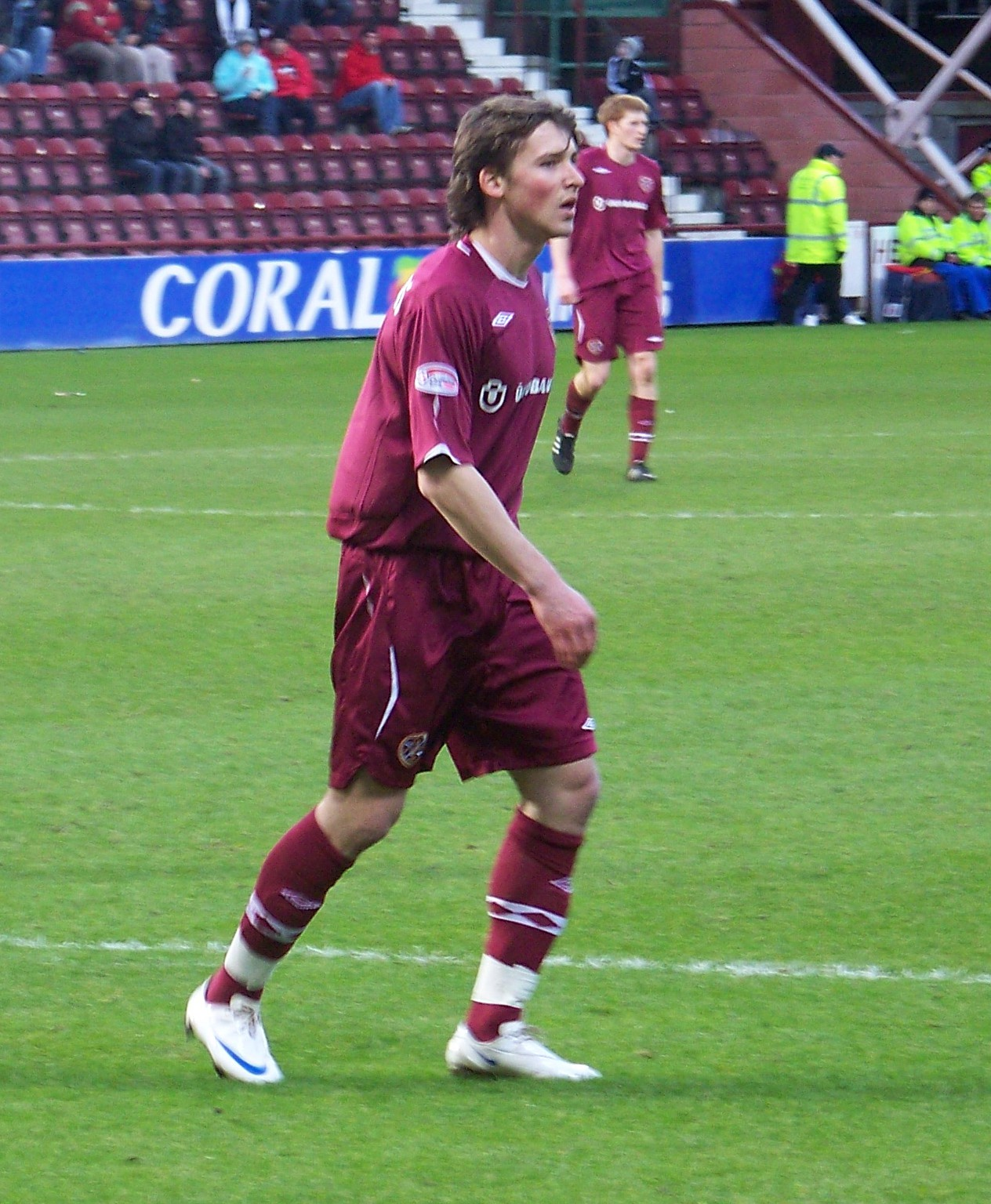
Mikoliūnas playing for Hearts in 2009

In January 2005, Mikoliūnas moved to Scottish club Heart of Midlothian on loan from FBK Kaunas. He was a regular in the first team for the hearts, however inconsistency always dogged his Hearts career. He silenced many critics with the winner at Tynecastle versus city rivals Hibernian on 26 December 2006. Mikoliūnas announced on 2 December 2008 that he wanted to leave the Edinburgh club after the 2008–09 season, to take up a new football challenge after spending four years at the club. On 27 April 2009, it was confirmed with immediate effect that the midfielder and his Lithuanian colleague Deividas Česnauskis had left Hearts.

The following month, Mikoliūnas stated he was to sign for Swansea City on a free transfer during the summer transfer window, but the move broke down after Swansea manager Roberto Martínez moved to Wigan Athletic. Eventually, Mikoliūnas signed a three-year contract with Ukrainian side Arsenal Kyiv.

In January 2013, Mikoliūnas moved to Ukrainian First League side FC Sevastopol. At the end of the season, his team achieved promotion to the Ukrainian Premier League. In August 2014, he signed for Belarusian club Shakhtyor Soligorsk. In December 2015, Lithuanian club Žalgiris Vilnius announced that Mikoliūnas will join the club for the 2016 season.

At the age of 39, Mikoliūnas announced his retirement from professional football in October 2023. He played his last match on 12 November 2023, on the last matchday of the 2023 A Lyga (12 November). Across all competitions, he has appeared in 221 games for Žalgiris, won the A Lyga title four times, and lifted the Lithuanian cup five times with his team.

== International career ==
Mikoliūnas made his debut for the Lithuania national team on 5 June 2004 in a friendly match against Portugal, and scored his first international goal in 2007 against Georgia. He followed that up a year later with a second goal against Romania. On 9 October 2014, in a UEFA Euro 2016 qualifying match, he scored the most recent goal of his five international goals, against Estonia in a 1–0 home victory.

After appearing in a Nations League match against Kazakhstan on 4 September 2020, Mikoliūnas attained his 85th cap for his country and thus became the most capped player for Lithuania, surpassing previous record holder Andrius Skerla. On 25 September 2022, he became the first Lithuanian player to reach 100 caps for the national team after playing in the Nations League match against Luxembourg.

== Off the Pitch ==
On 9 May 2019, Mikoliūnas received a UEFA B coaching license.

== Career statistics ==
Scores and results list Lithuania's goal tally first, score column indicates score after each Mikoliūnas goal.

List of international goals scored by Saulius Mikoliūnas
No.	Date	Venue	Opponent	Score	Result	Competition
1	2 June 2007	S. Darius and S. Girėnas Stadium, Kaunas, Lithuania	Georgia	1–0	1–0	UEFA Euro 2008 qualifying
2	6 September 2008	Gruia Stadium, Cluj-Napoca, Romania	Romania	2–0	3–0	FIFA World Cup 2010 qualifying
3	25 March 2011	S. Darius and S. Girėnas Stadium, Kaunas, Lithuania	Poland	1–0	2–0	Friendly
4	11 October 2013	LFF Stadium, Vilnius, Lithuania	Latvia	2–0	2–0	FIFA World Cup 2014 qualifying
5	9 October 2014	LFF Stadium, Vilnius, Lithuania	Estonia	1–0	1–0	UEFA Euro 2016 qualifying

== Honours ==
FBK Kaunas

- Lithuanian A Lyga: 2004
- Lithuanian Cup: 2004
- Lithuanian Super Cup: 2004

Heart of Midlothian

- Scottish Cup: 2005–06

FK Žalgiris

- Lithuanian A Lyga: 2016, 2020, 2021, 2022
- Lithuanian Cup: 2016 (2x), 2018, 2021, 2022
- Lithuanian Super Cup: 2016, 2017, 2020, 2023

== See also ==
- List of men's footballers with 100 or more international caps
