= Abdul Basit (footballer) =

Ghanaian footballer (born 1996)

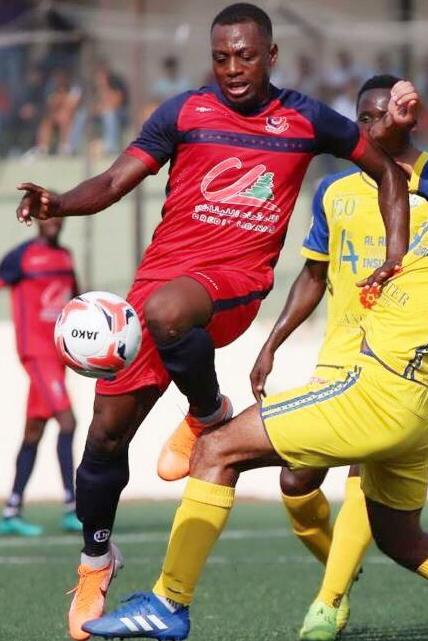
- Abdul Basit with Tadamon Sour in 2019

Personal information
- Full name: Mohammed Abdul Basit
- Date of birth: December 10, 1996 (age 29)
- Place of birth: Accra, Ghana
- Height: 1.85 m (6 ft 1 in)
- Positions: Striker; attacking midfielder

Youth career
- ?: Sekondi Eleven Wise

Senior career*
Years	Team	Apps	(Gls)
2010	New Edubiase United		
2011	Sharjah		
2011–2013	Berekum Chelsea	89	(46)
2014-2015	Al-Sulaibikhat SC	23	(15)
2015-2016	Al-Muharraq SC		
2016–2017	FC Stumbras	24	(3)
2017	→ Marítimo (loan)	6	(0)
2018	Techiman Eleven Wonders FC	1	(0)
2018	→ Rafik Sorman	14	(2)
2019	Tadamon Sour	10	(5)
2021	Berekum Chelsea	7	(4)
2022	Song Lam Nghe An	2	(1)
2022	Hong Linh Ha Tinh	4	(0)
2022–	Al-Sinaa SC	0	(0)

International career
2011	Ghana	8	(0)
- * Club domestic league appearances and goals

Mohammed Abdul Basit is a Ghanaian professional footballer who currently plays as an attacking midfielder for Al-Sinaa SC. A versatile offensive player, Abdul Basit can also play as second striker.

== Career ==
Abdul Basit has played for several Ghanaian teams as a midfielder.

In May 2016, he joined Lithuanian A Lyga side Stumbras and became one of his club leaders, being elected in A Lyga Team of the Week 5 times. On 31 January 2017 Basit joined Marítimo on loan.

After just half a season in Lebanon, Basit left Tadamon Sour in December 2019 due to uprise (crisis) in Lebanon.

In 2022, Basit moved to Vietnam to join V.League 1 team Song Lam Nghe An.

== International career ==
Basit featured for Ghana Local Black Stars team at the 2011 African Nations Championship (CHAN) in Sudan. Ghana lost 0–1 to Niger in their final Group B match in Wad Madany, Sudan.

In November 2013, coach Maxwell Konadu invited him to be a part of the Ghana squad for the 2013 WAFU Nations Cup. He helped the team to a first-place finish after Ghana beat Senegal by three goals to one.
