= Mohamed Sylla (footballer, born 1971) =

Guinean footballer

Personal information
- Full name: Mohamed Lamine Sylla
- Date of birth: 22 February 1971
- Place of birth: Conakry, Guinea
- Date of death: 9 June 2010 (aged 39)
- Height: 1.81 m (5 ft 11 in)
- Position: Forward

Senior career*
Years	Team	Apps	(Gls)
1986–1987	Hafia Conakry	33	(22)
1988–1989	Libreville	36	(23)
1989–1995	Willem II	145	(24)
1995–1997	Martigues	46	(6)
1997–1998	Ayr United	3	(0)
1998–2000	Paniliakos	15	(1)
2000	Niort	4	(0)
2000–2001	Istres	0	(0)
2001–2002	Stade Tunisien	0	(0)
Total		282	(76)

International career
1988–1999	Guinea	23	(5)
- * Club domestic league appearances and goals

Mohamed Sylla (22 February 1971 – 9 June 2010) was a Guinean professional footballer who played as a forward.

== Club career ==
Sylla started his career with local team Hafia Conakry; scoring many goals at Gabonese league side Libreville, he caught the eye of Dutch side Willem II. He was the first Guinean footballer to play in the Netherlands and stayed six years in Tilburg, before moving on to the lower French leagues and short spells in Scotland and Greece. He famously scored two goals for Willem II in an away game at Twente played in the snow; it is said it was the first time he had ever seen snow.

== International career ==
Sylla played for the Guinea national team for several years.

== Death ==
Sylla died on 9 June 2010 in a hospital in Marseille, after a long battle against lung and pancreatic cancer.

== Personal life ==
His son Abdoul Karim Sylla is also a professional footballer.
