= Edu Salles =

Brazilian footballer (born 1990)

Personal information
- Full name: Eduardo de Salles Oliveira
- Date of birth: 6 April 1990 (age 36)
- Place of birth: Curitiba, Brazil
- Height: 1.81 m (5 ft 11 1/2 in)
- Position: Striker

Team information
- Current team: San Fernando

Youth career
- 2009: Atlético Paranaense
- 2014–2015: Derby County U23

Senior career*
Years	Team	Apps	(Gls)
2008–2011	Atlético Paranaense		
2009–2010	Olimpi Rustavi	6	(4)
2011	Rio Branco	16	(9)
2011	Joinville		
2012	Marília	13	(13)
2013	BBCU		(5)
2014	Sport Boys	14	(7)
2016	Stumbras		(6)
2019–2020	Trujillo	18	(6)
2020–2021	Miajadas		(8)
2021–2022	Mensajero	30	(15)
2022–2023	Xerez Deportivo	14	(2)
2023	Águilas	9	(3)
2023–2024	Mensajero	33	(6)
2024–2025	FCB Magpies	4	(2)
2025	Socuéllamos	11	(2)
2025–	San Fernando	2	(1)
- * Club domestic league appearances and goals as of 14 September 2025

Eduardo de Salles Oliveira, known as just Edu Salles (born 6 April 1990) is a striker who plays for Spanish Tercera Federación club San Fernando.
