= Maksim Maksimov =

Russian footballer

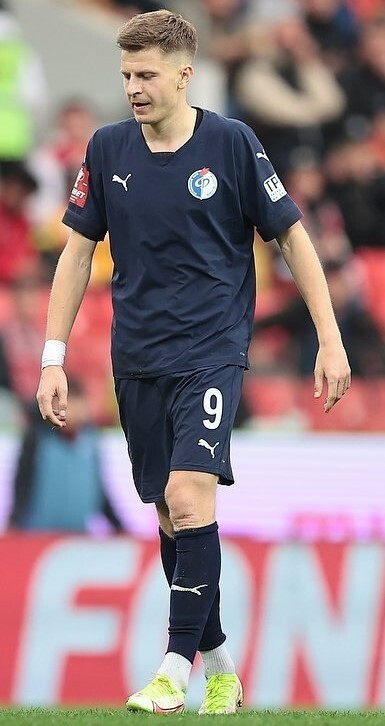
- Maksimov with Fakel Voronezh in 2022

Personal information
- Full name: Maksim Sergeyevich Maksimov
- Date of birth: 4 November 1995 (age 31)
- Place of birth: Voronezh, Russia
- Height: 1.90 m (6 ft 3 in)
- Position: Forward

Team information
- Current team: SKA-Khabarovsk
- Number: 21

Youth career
- –2012: Fakel Voronezh

Senior career*
Years	Team	Apps	(Gls)
2013–2016	Atlantas	75	(21)
2017	Trakai	16	(10)
2017–2019	Vardar	29	(8)
2019	RFS	4	(0)
2019	Torpedo Moscow	6	(1)
2020	Napredak Kruševac	0	(0)
2020–2024	Fakel Voronezh	105	(36)
2024–2025	Torpedo Moscow	29	(5)
2025–2026	Arsenal Tula	22	(1)
2026–	SKA-Khabarovsk	0	(0)
- * Club domestic league appearances and goals as of 16 May 2026

Maksim Sergeyevich Maksimov (Russian: Максим Сергеевич Максимов; born 4 November 1995) is a Russian football player who plays as a centre-forward for SKA-Khabarovsk.

== Club career ==
He started his professional career in Lithuania with Atlantas. After moving to Riteriai (known as FK Trakai at the time), he scored 7 goals in 6 games in the Europa League qualifiers, helping his club eliminate Scottish club St Johnstone and Swedish IFK Norrköping. Shortly after he transferred to Macedonian club Vardar. After a long investigation, on 27 May 2019 FIFA banned Maksimov from playing for 4 months and Vardar from acquiring new players for two transfer windows due to irregularities with his transfer.

On 28 August 2019 he signed a 2-year contract with Russian Football National League club Torpedo Moscow.

He made his professional debut in the Russian Football National League for Torpedo on 29 September 2019 in a game against Neftekhimik Nizhnekamsk. He started the game and was substituted at half-time. He scored his first Torpedo goal on 12 October 2019, a late winning goal in a 3–2 victory over Spartak-2 Moscow. On 26 November 2019, his contract was dissolved by mutual consent.

On 21 August 2020, he was on trials with Serbian SuperLiga side Napredak Kruševac.

Maksimov made his Russian Premier League debut for Fakel Voronezh on 17 July 2022 against Krasnodar.

On 30 May 2024, Maksimov left Fakel as his contract expired.

== Honours ==
Individual

- Russian Football National League top scorer: 2021–22 (22 goals).

== Career statistics ==
As of match played 16 May 2026

Appearances and goals by club, season and competition
Club	Season	League			Cup		Continental		Other		Total	
Club	Season	Division	Apps	Goals	Apps	Goals	Apps	Goals	Apps	Goals	Apps	Goals
Atlantas	2014	A Lyga	15	1	2	0	3 (Note: Appearances in the UEFA Europa League)	1	—		20	2
Atlantas	2015	A Lyga	29	10	5	2	2	0	—		36	12
Atlantas	2016	A Lyga	31	10	3	1	2	0	—		36	11
Atlantas	Total		75	21	10	3	7	1	0	0	92	25
Trakai	2017	A Lyga	16	10	2	2	6	7	—		24	19
Vardar	2017–18	Macedonian First Football League	25	8	1	0	–		—		26	8
Vardar	2018–19	Macedonian First Football League	4	0	0	0	2	0	—		6	0
Vardar	Total		29	8	1	0	2	0	0	0	32	8
RFS	2019	Virslīga	4	0	–		–		—		4	0
Torpedo Moscow	2019–20	Russian First League	6	1	1	0	–		—		7	1
Fakel Voronezh	2020–21	Russian First League	23	8	–		–		—		23	8
Fakel Voronezh	2021–22	Russian First League	37	22	2	0	–		—		39	22
Fakel Voronezh	2022–23	Russian Premier League	24	4	6	1	–		2 (Note: Appearances in relegation play-offs)	0	32	5
Fakel Voronezh	2023–24	Russian Premier League	21	2	6	2	–		—		27	4
Fakel Voronezh	Total		105	36	14	3	0	0	2	0	121	39
Torpedo Moscow	2024–25	Russian First League	29	5	2	0	–		–		31	5
Arsenal Tula	2025–26	Russian First League	22	1	4	1	–		–		26	2
Career total			286	82	34	9	15	8	2	0	337	99
