= Rimvydas Sadauskas =

Lithuanian footballer (born 1996)

Personal information
- Date of birth: 21 July 1996 (age 30)
- Place of birth: Kaunas, Lithuania
- Height: 1.93 m (6 ft 4 in)
- Position: Defender

Team information
- Current team: Hegelmann
- Number: 18

Senior career*
Years	Team	Apps	(Gls)
2015–2019	Stumbras	104	(2)
2017	→ Cork City (loan)	0	(0)
2019–2021	Kauno Žalgiris	50	(2)
2022–2023	Šiauliai	54	(3)
2024	Guangzhou FC	23	(1)
2025	Chongqing Tonglianglong	29	(1)
2026–	Hegelmann	20	(0)
- * Club domestic league appearances and goals

Rimvydas Sadauskas (born 21 July 1996) is a Lithuanian footballer who plays as a defender for Hegelmann.

== Early life ==
Sadauskas started playing football at the age of six. He joined the National Football Academy of Lithuania at the age of seventeen.

== Career ==
Sadauskas started his career with Lithuanian side Stumbras. He was describe as "a real pillar of Stumbro's defense ...showing surprising consistency". In 2017, he signed for Irish side Cork City. In 2019, he signed for Lithuanian side Kauno Žalgiris. In 2022, he signed for Lithuanian side Šiauliai. In 2024, he signed for Chinese side Guangzhou FC.

On 5 February 2026, Sadauskas returned to Lithuania and joined Hegelmann.

== Personal life ==
Sadauskas was born in 1998 in Lithuania. He grew up in Kaunas, Lithuania.

== Career statistics ==
As of match played 8 November 2025

Appearances and goals by club, season and competition
Club	Season	League			National Cup		Continental		Other		Total	
Club	Season	Division	Apps	Goals	Apps	Goals	Apps	Goals	Apps	Goals	Apps	Goals
Stumbras	2015	A Lyga	28	1	0	0	—		—		28	1
Stumbras	2016	A Lyga	31	1	3	1	—		—		34	1
Stumbras	2017	A Lyga	3	0	1	0	—		2	0	6	0
Stumbras	2018	A Lyga	29	0	4	1	2	0	1	0	36	1
Stumbras	2019	A Lyga	13	0	2	0	—		—		15	0
Stumbras	Total		104	2	10	1	2	0	3	0	119	3
Cork City (loan)	2017	League of Ireland Premier Division	0	0	0	0	—		—		0	0
Kauno Žalgiris	2019	A Lyga	12	1	1	0	2	0	—		15	1
Kauno Žalgiris	2020	A Lyga	15	0	2	0	0	0	—		17	0
Kauno Žalgiris	2021	A Lyga	23	1	1	0	3	0	—		27	1
Kauno Žalgiris	Total		50	2	4	0	5	0	—		59	2
Šiauliai	2022	A Lyga	31	0	1	0	—		—		32	0
Šiauliai	2023	A Lyga	23	3	3	0	—		—		26	3
Šiauliai	Total		54	3	4	0	—		—		58	3
Guangzhou FC	2024	China League One	23	1	0	0	—		—		23	1
Chongqing Tonglianglong	2025	China League One	29	1	0	0	—		—		29	1
Career total			260	9	18	1	7	0	3	0	283	10
