= Vilius Armanavičius =

Lithuanian footballer (born 1995)

Personal information
- Date of birth: 8 May 1995 (age 31)
- Place of birth: Kaunas, Lithuania
- Height: 1.83 m (6 ft 0 in)
- Position: Midfielder

Team information
- Current team: FC Hegelmann

Youth career
- NFA

Senior career*
Years	Team	Apps	(Gls)
2014–2018	Stumbras	71	(1)
2018–2019	Jonava	8	(1)
2019–2020	Atlantas	30	(1)
2020–2022	Hegelmann	91	(30)
2023	Caspiy Aktau	8	(0)
2023–2025	Kauno Žalgiris	77	(12)
2026–	Hegelmann	21	(4)

International career^{‡}
2013–2014	Lithuania U19	5	(0)
2014–2015	Lithuania U21	7	(0)
2021–	Lithuania	1	(0)
- * Club domestic league appearances and goals as of 27 July 2026 ‡ National team caps and goals as of 12 October 2021

Vilius Armanavičius (born 8 May 1995) is a Lithuanian professional football player.

== International career ==
He made his debut for the Lithuania national football team on 12 October 2021 in a World Cup qualifier against Switzerland.
