= Marius Rapalis =

Lithuanian footballer

Personal information
- Date of birth: 22 March 1983 (age 43)
- Place of birth: Vilnius, Lithuanian SSR, Soviet Union
- Height: 1.86 m (6 ft 1 in)
- Position: Goalkeeper

Youth career
- 2000–2002: Žalgiris Vilnius

Senior career*
Years	Team	Apps	(Gls)
2002–2008	Žalgiris Vilnius	42	(0)
2003	→ Polonija Vilnius (loan)		
2005	→ Polonija Vilnius (loan)		
2008–2009	Tavriya Simferopol	0	(0)
2009	Vėtra		
2010	Sūduva Marijampolė	9	(0)
2010	Šiauliai	4	(0)
2011–2012	Žalgiris Vilnius	16	(0)
2013–2014	Neman Grodno	22	(0)
2015–2016	Trakai	49	(0)
2016	Spartaks Jūrmala	1	(0)

International career^{‡}
2002	Lithuania U21	1	(0)
- * Club domestic league appearances and goals as of 31 December 2016 ‡ National team caps and goals as of 20 December 2013

Marius Rapalis (born 22 March 1983 in Vilnius) is a Lithuanian retired professional football goalkeeper.

== International career ==
Rapalis was called up to the senior Lithuania squad for a friendly against Poland in June 2016.
