= Andrei Ciofu =

Moldovan footballer

Personal information
- Full name: Andrei Ciofu
- Date of birth: 31 May 1994 (age 32)
- Place of birth: Pîrlița, Moldova
- Height: 1.76 m (5 ft 9 1/2 in)
- Position: Winger

Youth career
- Zimbru Chișinău

Senior career*
| Years | Team | Apps | (Gls) |
| 2012–2014 | Milsami Orhei | 26 | (2) |
| 2014 | FC Costuleni | 11 | (1) |
| 2015 | Academia Chișinău | 8 | (0) |
| 2016 | Speranța Nisporeni | 22 | (1) |
| 2017 | Atlantas | 28 | (1) |
| 2018 | Sparta | 11 | (0) |
| 2018 | Vereya | 2 | (0) |
| 2019 | Stumbras | 12 | (0) |
| 2019 | Panevėžys | 8 | (1) |
| 2020 | Olimpia Grudziądz | 0 | (0) |
| Total | | 128 | (6) |

International career
| 2010–2011 | Moldova U17 | 5 | (1) |
| 2012 | Moldova U19 | 3 | (0) |
| 2015 | Moldova U21 | 9 | (1) |
- * Club domestic league appearances and goals

Andrei Ciofu (born 31 May 1994) is a Moldovan former professional footballer who played as a midfielder.

== Club career ==
On 28 September 2020, he signed with Polish club Olimpia Grudziądz.

== Honours ==
Milsami Orhei

- Moldovan Cup: 2011–12
- Moldovan Super Cup: 2012
