= Evan Alexandrow-Ridley =

Lithuanian-Australian footballer (born 1994)

Personal information
- Date of birth: 19 June 1994 (age 32)
- Place of birth: Australia
- Position: Goalkeeper

Senior career*
Years	Team	Apps	(Gls)
–2014	Hume City FC		
2014	FK Ekranas	4	(0)
2015	FC Džiugas Telšiai	23	(0)
2016	FC Stumbras	5	(0)
2017	FK Atlantas	5	(0)
2018	SK Viktorie Jirny	3	(0)
2018	FK Sūduva	0	(0)
2019	Moss FK	3	(0)
2020–2021	Monaro Panthers FC	23	(0)

International career
2016	Lithuania U21	1	(0)
- * Club domestic league appearances and goals

Evan Alexandrow-Ridley (Lithuanian: Evanas Aleksandrovas-Ridley; born 19 June 1996) is a Lithuanian-Australian footballer who plays as goalkeeper. Born in Australia, he was a Lithuania youth international.

== Life ==
Alexandrow-Ridley played cricket as a child. He had a Lithuanian grandmother. He grew up in the Bega Valley Shire, Australia. He attended the ACT Academy of Sport in Australia. He obtained a Lithuania passport in 2012.

== Club career ==
Alexandrow-Ridley started his career with Australian side West Canberra Wanderers FC, where he was regarded as one of the club's most important players and helped the club reach their first championship final. After that, he played for Norwegian side Moss FK.

== International career ==
Alexandrow-Ridley debuted for the Lithuania national under-21 football team during a 0–2 loss to Latvia.
