= Oleg Dmitriyev (footballer, born 1995) =

Russian football player

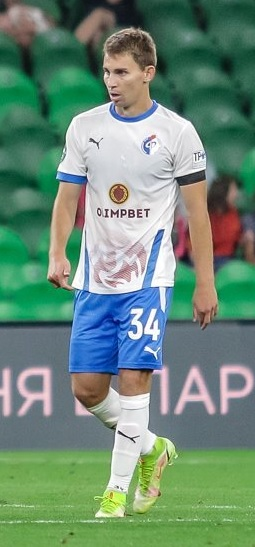
- Dmitriyev with Fakel Voronezh in 2022

Personal information
- Full name: Oleg Sergeyevich Dmitriyev
- Date of birth: 18 November 1995 (age 31)
- Place of birth: Vyazma, Russia
- Height: 1.80 m (5 ft 11 in)
- Position: Midfielder

Team information
- Current team: FC Volgar Astrakhan
- Number: 34

Youth career
- –2006: FShM Moscow
- 2007–2009: DYuSSh Vyazma
- 2009–2011: FShM Moscow
- 2011–2013: FC Dynamo Moscow

Senior career*
Years	Team	Apps	(Gls)
2015	FC Oryol	6	(0)
2015	FK Palanga	3	(0)
2015–2017	FK Atlantas	46	(6)
2017–2018	FC Baltika Kaliningrad	19	(0)
2018	→ Spartaks Jūrmala (loan)	15	(1)
2019	FC Urozhay Krasnodar	12	(2)
2019–2022	FC Fakel Voronezh	111	(9)
2023–2024	FC Rodina Moscow	41	(0)
2024	FC Arsenal Tula	7	(0)
2025–	FC Volgar Astrakhan	58	(3)
- * Club domestic league appearances and goals as of 15 November 2026

Oleg Sergeyevich Dmitriyev (Russian: Олег Сергеевич Дмитриев; born 18 November 1995) is a Russian football player who plays for FC Volgar Astrakhan.

== Club career ==
He made his debut in the Russian Professional Football League for FC Oryol on 30 April 2015 in a game against FC Vityaz Podolsk.

He made his Russian Football National League debut for FC Baltika Kaliningrad on 9 August 2017 in a game against FC Yenisey Krasnoyarsk.

Dmitriyev made his Russian Premier League debut for FC Fakel Voronezh on 17 July 2022 against FC Krasnodar. Dmitriyev's contract with Fakel was terminated by mutual consent on 1 December 2022.

== Career statistics ==
As of 27 November 2022

Club	Season	League			Cup		Continental		Other		Total	
Club	Season	Division	Apps	Goals	Apps	Goals	Apps	Goals	Apps	Goals	Apps	Goals
Oryol	2014–15	Second League	6	0	–		–		–		6	0
Palanga	2015	I Lyga	3	0	–		–		–		3	0
Atlantas	2015	A Lyga	7	0	2	0	–		–		9	0
Atlantas	2016	A Lyga	25	2	2	1	2 (Note: Appearances in the UEFA Europa League)	0	–		29	3
Atlantas	2017	A Lyga	14	4	1	0	–		–		15	4
Atlantas	Total		46	6	5	1	2	0	0	0	53	7
Baltika Kaliningrad	2017–18	First League	4	0	0	0	–		–		4	0
Baltika Kaliningrad	2018–19	First League	15	0	2	0	–		–		17	0
Baltika Kaliningrad	Total		19	0	2	0	0	0	0	0	21	0
Spartaks Jūrmala (loan)	2018	Virslīga	15	1	2	3	4 (Note: Two appearances in the UEFA Champions League, two appearances in the UEFA Europa League)	0	–		21	4
Urozhay Krasnodar	2018–19	Second League	12	2	–		–		–		12	2
Fakel Voronezh	2019–20	First League	26	2	0	0	–		2 (Note: Appearances in the FNL Cup)	1	28	3
Fakel Voronezh	2020–21	First League	35	7	0	0	–		–		35	7
Fakel Voronezh	2021–22	First League	34	0	3	0	–		–		37	0
Fakel Voronezh	2022–23	RPL	16	0	5	0	–		–		21	0
Fakel Voronezh	Total		111	9	8	0	0	0	2	1	121	10
Career total			212	18	17	4	6	0	2	1	237	23
