= Rafael Broetto =

Brazilian footballer (born 1990)

Personal information
- Full name: Rafael Broetto Henrique
- Date of birth: 18 August 1990 (age 36)
- Place of birth: Terra Boa, Brazil
- Height: 1.95 m (6 ft 5 in)
- Position: Goalkeeper

Team information
- Current team: Vestri
- Number: 12

Senior career*
Years	Team	Apps	(Gls)
–2015	Coritiba		
2015	Mamoré	3	(0)
2015–2016	Bragantino	3	(0)
2016–2017	Stumbras	17	(0)
2017–2019	Marítimo	0	(0)
2018–2019	→ Varzim (loan)	5	(0)
2019–2023	Panevėžys	63	(0)
2023–	Vestri	16	(0)
- * Club domestic league appearances and goals as of 10 November 2023

Rafael Broetto (born 18 August 1990) is a Brazilian professional footballer who plays as a goalkeeper for Icelandic club Vestri.

== Football career ==
On 29 January 2017, Rafael Broetto signed a three-and-a-half contract with Marítimo.

Played in lithuanian FC Stumbras, later return to Portugal in Marítimo.

In summer 2019 became a member of Lithuanian FK Panevėžys.
