= Pavel Kotov (footballer) =

Russian footballer

Personal information
- Full name: Pavel Grigoryevich Kotov
- Date of birth: 21 June 1995 (age 31)
- Place of birth: Dedovsk, Russia
- Height: 1.80 m (5 ft 11 in)
- Position: Left-back

Team information
- Current team: FC Veles Moscow
- Number: 17

Youth career
- 2002–2013: PFC CSKA Moscow

Senior career*
Years	Team	Apps	(Gls)
2013–2015	PFC CSKA Moscow	0	(0)
2015–2016	FC Neftekhimik Nizhnekamsk	9	(0)
2016	FC Stumbras	7	(0)
2017–2019	FC Strogino Moscow	46	(2)
2019–2021	FC Veles Moscow	50	(2)
2021–2024	FC Neftekhimik Nizhnekamsk	87	(7)
2024–2025	FC Rotor Volgograd	0	(0)
2025–	FC Veles Moscow	18	(1)
- * Club domestic league appearances and goals as of 13 June 2026

Pavel Grigoryevich Kotov (Russian: Павел Григорьевич Котов; born 21 June 1995) is a Russian professional football player who plays for FC Veles Moscow.

== Club career ==
He made his professional debut on 24 September 2014 for PFC CSKA Moscow in a Russian Cup game against FC Khimik Dzerzhinsk.
