= Valdemar Borovskij =

Lithuanian footballer

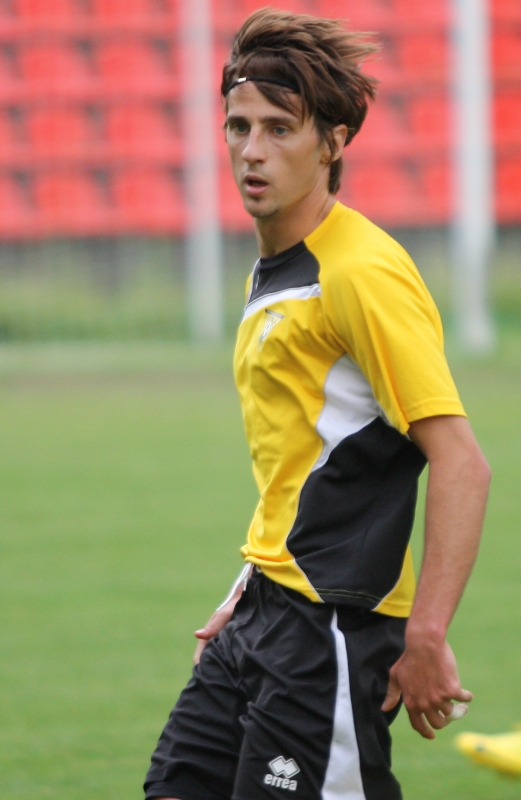
- Borovskij with Šiauliai in 2010

Personal information
- Date of birth: May 2, 1984 (age 42)
- Place of birth: Vilnius, Lithuanian SSR, USSR (now Republic of Lithuania)
- Height: 1.81 m (5 ft 11 in)
- Position: Right-back

Youth career
- –2005: FK Sūduva

Senior career*
Years	Team	Apps	(Gls)
2005–2007	Geležinis Vilkas		
2008–2009	Vėtra	49	(1)
2010	Šiauliai	12	(0)
2011–2012	Sūduva	67	(1)
2013–2014	Daugava Rīga	47	(1)
2014	Šiauliai	7	(0)
2015	Beroe Stara Zagora	2	(0)
2016	Lietava	32	(2)
2017–2023	Riteriai	207	(11)

International career^{‡}
2010–	Lithuania	27	(0)
- * Club domestic league appearances and goals as of 5 December 2023 ‡ National team caps and goals as of 12:06, April 13, 2019 (UTC)

Valdemar Borovskij (also known as Valdemaras Borovskis; born 2 May 1984) is a Lithuanian professional footballer who plays as a right-back for A Lyga club Riteriai.

== Career ==
On 8 February 2015, Borovskij signed with Bulgarian club Beroe Stara Zagora following a successful trial period. On 22 February, he was sent off for a second yellow card in his official debut - a 0:1 away loss against champions Ludogorets Razgrad in the second leg of a Bulgarian Cup match.

Before the start of 2016 season Valdemar signed one year contract with I Lyga winners Lietava. He became one of his team leaders and helped team to qualify into the Championship round. Borovskij was elected into the A Lyga Team of the Week 8 times and was elected FK Lietava Player of the Year after season ended.

On 26 December 2016, he agreed to join A Lyga vice-champions Trakai.

== International career ==
Borovskij's good form in the 2011 A Lyga season saw him named in the Lithuanian squad for a friendly against Poland. On 25 March 2011, he made his Lithuania debut in the 2–0 win over Poland, coming on for Edgaras Česnauskis as a substitute in the 82nd minute.

== Career statistics ==
=== National team ===
Lithuania national team
Year	Apps	Goals
2011	1	0
2012	7	0
2013	5	0
2014	3	0
2015	0	0
Total	16	0
