= Ernestas Veliulis =

Lithuanian footballer

Personal information
- Date of birth: 22 August 1992 (age 34)
- Place of birth: Panevėžys, Lithuania
- Height: 1.82 m (6 ft 0 in)
- Position: Midfielder

Team information
- Current team: FK Panevėžys
- Number: 7

Youth career
- 2009–2010: Ekranas

Senior career*
Years	Team	Apps	(Gls)
2010–2012	Kruoja	68	(9)
2013	Daugava Riga	6	(1)
2013	Atlantas	7	(1)
2014	Klaipėdos Granitas	32	(10)
2015–2017	Sūduva	93	(23)
2018	Jonava	23	(4)
2019–	Panevėžys	200	(22)

International career^{‡}
2008–2008	Lithuania U17	1	(0)
	Lithuania U21	16	(1)
2016–	Lithuania	4	(0)
- * Club domestic league appearances and goals as of 7 September 2026 ‡ National team caps and goals as of 13 October 2021

Ernestas Veliulis (born 22 August 1992) is a Lithuanian professional footballer who plays as a midfielder for Lithuanian A Lyga side FK Panevėžys. He has been capped by Lithuania once, playing for 28 minutes as a substitute in the 1-0 loss to Romania on 23 March 2016. He has also been capped for the Lithuanian under-17 and under-21 sides.

== Honours ==
FK Panevėžys

- A Lyga
  - Winners (1): 2023
  - 3rd place (1): 2022
- Lithuanian Cup
  - Winners (2): 2020, 2025
  - 2nd place (1): 2021
- Lithuanian Supercup
  - Winners (2): 2021, 2024
