= Markas Beneta =

Lithuanian footballer

Personal information
- Date of birth: 8 July 1993 (age 33)
- Place of birth: Klaipėda, Lithuania
- Height: 1.81 m (5 ft 11 in)
- Position: Full-back

Team information
- Current team: Sūduva
- Number: 29

Senior career*
Years	Team	Apps	(Gls)
2011	Klaipėda	12	(0)
2011	Žalgiris	0	(0)
2012–2017	Atlantas	133	(3)
2018	Kauno Žalgiris	30	(1)
2019	Narva Trans	23	(4)
2020	Zagłębie Sosnowiec	12	(1)
2021–2022	Sūduva	60	(2)
2023–2024	Panevėžys	52	(1)
2025–	Sūduva	35	(0)

International career^{‡}
2011–2012	Lithuania U19	6	(0)
2012–2014	Lithuania U21	15	(0)
2016–	Lithuania	26	(0)
- * Club domestic league appearances and goals as of 2 March 2026 (UTC) ‡ National team caps and goals as of 11:06, 18 November 2025 (UTC)

Markas Beneta (born 8 July 1993) is a Lithuanian professional footballer who plays as a full-back for A Lyga club Sūduva and the Lithuania national team.

== Club career ==
Beneta started his professional career at Klaipėda. In 2011, he moved to Žalgiris.

=== Panevėžys ===
On 4 January 2023, Beneta signed with Panevėžys.

=== Sūduva ===
On 24 January 2025, Sūduva announced the signing of Beneta.

== Career statistics ==
=== International ===
As of match played 17 November 2025

Appearances and goals by national team and year
National team	Year	Apps	Goals
Lithuania
Lithuania	2016	1	0
Lithuania	2021	6	0
Lithuania	2022	6	0
Lithuania	2023	9	0
Lithuania	2024	1	0
Lithuania	2025	3	0
Total		26	0

== Honours ==
Trans Narva

- Estonian Cup: 2018–19

Sūduva

- Lithuanian Supercup: 2022

Panevėžys

- A Lyga: 2023
- Lithuanian Supercup: 2024
