= Klaudijus Upstas =

Lithuanian footballer (born 1994)

Personal information
- Date of birth: 30 October 1994 (age 32)
- Place of birth: Kaunas, Lithuania
- Height: 1.77 m (5 ft 10 in)
- Position: Midfielder

Team information
- Current team: FK Žalgiris
- Number: 13

Senior career*
Years	Team	Apps	(Gls)
2012	NFA Kaunas		
2013	Tauras Tauragė	4	(0)
2013	Šilas Kazlų Rūda	16	(4)
2014	Banga Gargždai	13	(1)
2015–2016	FC Stumbras	45	(3)
2017–2018	FK Jonava	33	(6)
2019	FK Atlantas	9	(0)
2019	FK Palanga	7	(0)
2020–2025	FC Hegelmann	171	(8)
2026–	FK Žalgiris	20	(0)

International career
2022–	Lithuania	14	(0)
- * Club domestic league appearances and goals as of 31 August 2026

Klaudijus Upstas (born 30 October 1994) is a Lithuanian footballer who plays as a midfielder for FK Žalgiris.

He made his A Lyga debut in 2013 with FK Tauras Tauragė. Up to 2020 he was a journeyman footballer around Lithuania, before settling in FC Hegelmann.

He played six straight seasons for Hegelmann and became team captain. He first helped the club win promotion to the highest league, then helped the team reach cup finals, become runners-up in the league; he also got his first experience in continental club competition. Inn 2026 he moved on to FK Žalgiris.

Upstas made his senior international debut for Lithuania during the 2022 Baltic Cup. In 2025 Upstas and Lithuania faced the Netherlands home and away.
