= Vitaliy Polyanskyi =

Ukrainian footballer (born 1988)

Personal information
- Full name: Vitaliy Polyanskyi
- Date of birth: 30 November 1988 (age 37)
- Place of birth: Dnipropetrovsk, Ukrainian SSR, USSR
- Position: Centre back

Senior career*
Years	Team	Apps	(Gls)
2007	SC Olkom Melitopol		
2008	FC Pärnu Vaprus	15	(1)
2009	FC Volyn Lutsk	9	(0)
2009–2010	FC Feniks-Illichovets	3	(0)
2011	FK Mažeikiai	26	(0)
2012–2013	FC Olimpik Donetsk	8	(0)
2013	FC Slavutych Cherkasy	1	(0)
2016	FK RFS	3	(0)
2016	FK Utenis	13	(2)
- * Club domestic league appearances and goals

Vitaliy Polyanskyi (born 30 November 1988) is a Ukrainian professional footballer, who lastly played for FK Utenis. He plays the position of defender. His former clubs include FC Olkom Melitopol, FC Pärnu Vaprus, FC Volyn Lutsk, FC Feniks-Illichovets Kalinine and Lithuanian side FK Mažeikiai.

== Club career ==
=== FC Pärnu Vaprus ===
He scored his first Meistriliiga goal on 4 October 2008, in the 87th minute in a 5–5 draw against JK Nõmme Kalju.
