= Admir Kecap =

Serbian footballer

Personal information
- Date of birth: 25 November 1987 (age 38)
- Place of birth: Novi Pazar, SR Serbia, SFR Yugoslavia
- Height: 1.86 m (6 ft 1 in)
- Position: Left winger

Team information
- Current team: FK Tutin

Youth career
- Novi Pazar

Senior career*
Years	Team	Apps	(Gls)
2005–2009	Jošanica		
2009	→ Novi Pazar (loan)	14	(3)
2009–2015	Novi Pazar	154	(22)
2015–2016	Sūduva	47	(10)
2017–2018	Novi Pazar	30	(6)
2018–2019	Metalac	32	(3)
2019–2020	Trayal Kruševac	19	(5)
2020–2021	Novi Pazar	12	(0)
2021–2022	FK Tutin		
2022-2023	FK Rušanj		
2023–	FK Tutin		
- * Club domestic league appearances and goals as of 25 December 2022

Admir Kecap (Serbian Cyrillic: Адмир Кецап; born 25 November 1987) is a Serbian football left winger who plays for FK Tutin.

== Career ==
Born in Novi Pazar, Kecap passed youth categories of the local club with same name. He started his senior career with lower ranked club Jošanica, where he spent several seasons before he returned in his home club in 2009. Playing for Novi Pazar, Kecap noted more than 150 caps in the Serbian First League and Serbian SuperLiga between 2009 and 2015. In summer 2015, Kecap moved to Sūduva Marijampolė, where he stayed until the end of 2016. After the end of contract with club, Kecap joined Novi Pazar again at the beginning of 2017.

Kecap also played a rival match for the team named "Selekcija novinara" (News writer's selection), which was created from players who mostly appeared in the Serbian SuperLiga, against Serbia national football team, at the Užice City Stadium.

== Private life ==
Kecap received a faculty diploma in 2013, and was nominated for the best sportsman of Novi Pazar in the same year.
