= Marius Papšys =

Lithuanian footballer

Personal information
- Date of birth: 13 May 1989 (age 37)
- Place of birth: Klaipėda, Lithuania
- Height: 1.83 m (6 ft 0 in)
- Position: Right winger

Team information
- Current team: Sirijus Klaipėda

Senior career*
Years	Team	Apps	(Gls)
2005–2008	FC Vilnius	6	(3)
2007	→ Interas (loan)	16	(1)
2009	Amkar-2 Perm	15	(1)
2010	Sirijus Klaipėda	19	(5)
2011–2012	1. FK Příbram	33	(2)
2013–2014	Atlantas	54	(17)
2015	Klaipėdos Granitas	30	(9)
2016	Atlantas	27	(2)
2017	Stumbras	13	(1)
2017	→ Stumbras B	4	(2)
2017	Sepsi OSK	10	(0)
2018	Atlantas	29	(3)
2019	Džiugas	5	(3)
2020	Atmosfera	10	(4)
2020–2021	Neptūnas	24	(7)
2022	Saned Joniškis	15	(5)
2023	Sakuona Plikiai		
2024–	Sirijus Klaipėda		

International career
2007–2011	Lithuania U21	25	(10)
2011–2017	Lithuania	8	(0)
- * Club domestic league appearances and goals as of 19:22, 18 October 2022 (UTC)

Marius Papšys (born 13 May 1989) is a Lithuanian footballer who plays as a right winger for Sirijus Klaipėda.

== Club career ==
In 2006, Papšys signed for second tier Lithuanian side FK Vilnius. During his time there, he was loaned out to Interas-AE Visaginas where he made 16 appearances.

In 2009, he signed with Russian side FC Amkar Perm, but he only managed to make the reserves side. Shortly after, he signed with his hometown club FK Klaipėda where he scored two goals in 19 games.

In 2010, he transferred to Gambrinus liga side 1. FK Příbram where he played for the following two and a half seasons.

On 27 February 2017, Papšys agreed with Lithuanian A Lyga team Stumbras. He left the club after three months.

== International career ==
On 7 June 2011 Papšys made his debut for the Lithuania national football team in a friendly match against Norway.
