= Eugen Zasavițchi =

Moldovan footballer

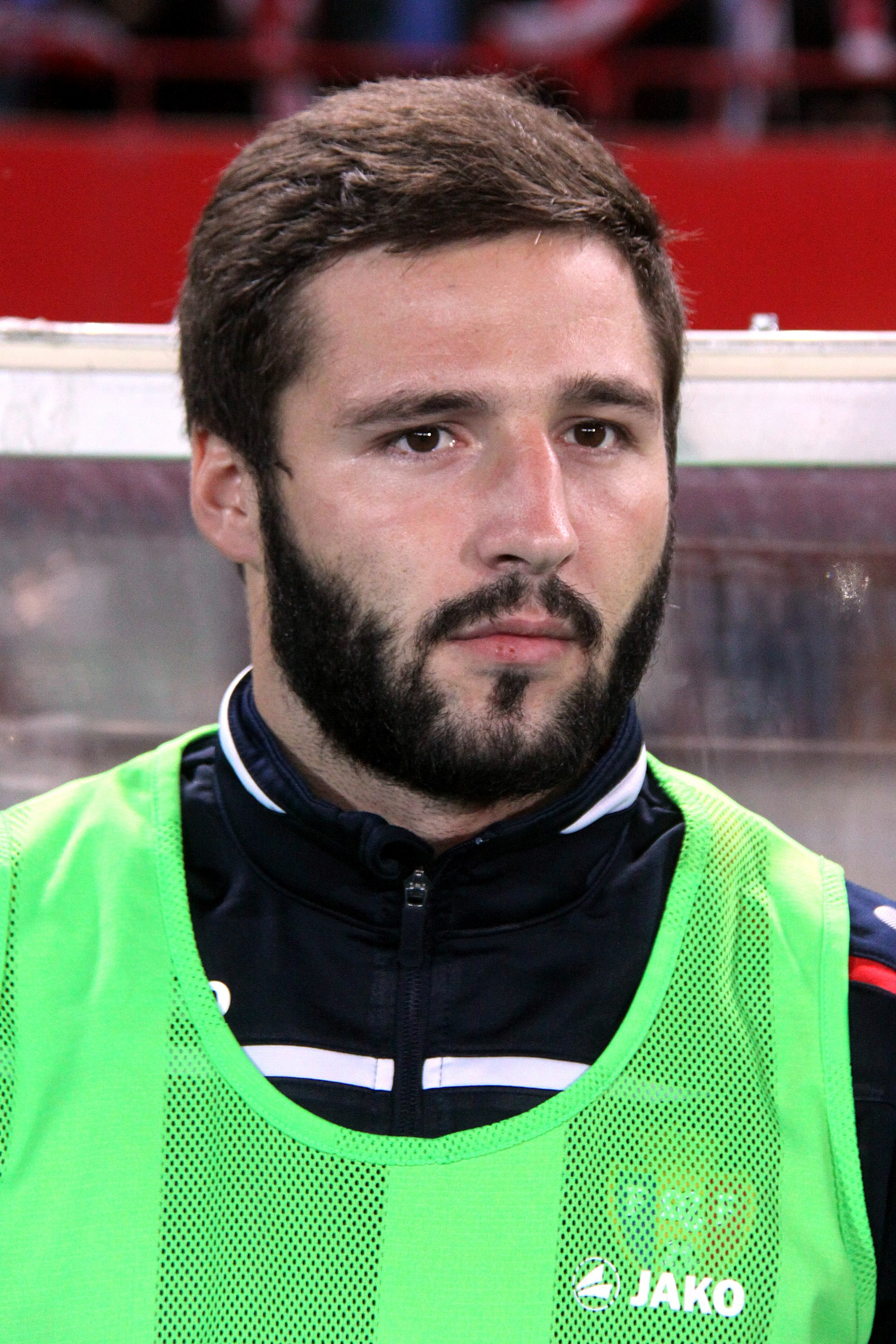
- Zasavițchi with Moldova in 2015

Personal information
- Full name: Eugen Zasavițchi
- Date of birth: 24 November 1992 (age 33)
- Place of birth: Chișinău, Moldova
- Height: 1.78 m (5 ft 10 in)
- Position: Midfielder

Youth career
- CSCT Buiucani

Senior career*
Years	Team	Apps	(Gls)
2010–2013	Dacia-2 Buiucani	28	(1)
2013–2014	Veris Chișinău	20	(1)
2015–2017	Trakai	64	(5)
2017	→ GKS Tychy (loan)	6	(0)
2017	Dacia Chișinău	12	(0)
2018	Jonava	18	(0)
2018	Zimbru Chișinău	14	(1)
2019	Nõmme Kalju	3	(0)
2019	Dnyapro Mogilev	11	(0)
2020	Minaur Baia Mare	?	(?)
2020	Petrolul Ploiești	1	(0)
2020–2022	Milsami Orhei	42	(1)
2022–2024	Dacia Buiucani	40	(3)

International career
2016	Moldova	1	(0)
- * Club domestic league appearances and goals as of 15 June 2024

Eugen Zasavițchi (born 24 November 1992) is a Moldovan professional footballer who plays as a midfielder.
