= Benjamin Terry (footballer) =

Ghanaian footballer

Personal information
- Full name: Benjamin Terry
- Date of birth: 6 October 1994 (age 32)
- Place of birth: Ghana
- Height: 1.82 m (6 ft 0 in)
- Positions: Winger; second striker

Team information
- Current team: Al-Bahri
- Number: 21

Senior career*
| Years | Team | Apps | (Gls) |
| 2011–2013 | Amidaus | | |
| 2013–2015 | Tema Youth | | |
| 2015–2016 | Ashanti Gold | | |
| 2016–2017 | FC Stumbras | | |
| 2017– | Al-Bahri | 13 | (6) |
- * Club domestic league appearances and goals as of 4 February 2019

Benjamin Terry (born Oct. 6, 1994) is a Ghanaian footballer who plays as a winger or second striker for Al-Bahri in the Iraqi Premier League.

== Honours ==
FC Stumbras

- Lithuanian Football Cup: 2017.
