= Abdoul Karim Sylla (footballer, born 1992) =

Dutch footballer (born 1992)

Personal information
- Date of birth: 23 January 1992 (age 34)
- Place of birth: Turnov, Czechoslovakia
- Height: 1.80 m (5 ft 11 in)
- Position: Forward

Senior career*
Years	Team	Apps	(Gls)
2011–2012	Montpellier B	4	(0)
2012–2013	Montpellier	0	(0)
2013	Fréjus	15	(0)
2014–2015	Andrézieux	9	(3)
2015–2016	Sedan		
2016	FK Atlantas	26	(9)
2018–2021	Stade Beaucairois	44	(23)
2021–2022	Istres	17	(8)
2022–2024	Stade Beaucairois		
- * Club domestic league appearances and goals

Abdoul Karim Sylla (born 23 January 1992) is a Dutch footballer who most recently played as a forward for Stade Beaucairois.

== Career ==
In May 2012, Sylla signed his first professional contract with Montpellier having agreed a one-year deal with the option of two further years.

In November 2015, he joined Sedan, along with his stepfather Pascal Feindouno.

In May 2016, he moved to Lithuanian side FK Atlantas, again with Feindouno.

== Personal life ==
Sylla is the son of former professional footballer Mohamed Sylla. After his father's death he was adopted by fellow Guinean footballer Pascal Feindouno.
