= Artyom Gurenko =

Belarusian footballer

Personal information
- Full name: Artyom Sergeyevich Gurenko
- Date of birth: 18 June 1994 (age 32)
- Place of birth: Grodno, Belarus
- Height: 1.72 m (5 ft 8 in)
- Position: Midfielder

Team information
- Current team: Vitebsk
- Number: 11

Youth career
- 2011–2012: Minsk

Senior career*
Years	Team	Apps	(Gls)
2012–2014	Minsk	1	(0)
2013–2014	→ Minsk-2	57	(7)
2015–2016	Trakai	59	(12)
2017	Sūduva Marijampolė	8	(0)
2017	Slutsk	10	(1)
2018	Dinamo Minsk	20	(0)
2019	Riteriai	15	(3)
2019–2020	Vitebsk	41	(3)
2021	Isloch Minsk Raion	25	(0)
2022	Belshina Bobruisk	14	(0)
2022	Turan	9	(1)
2023	Belshina Bobruisk	13	(2)
2023–2025	Ufa	66	(7)
2025–2026	Leningradets	32	(3)
2026–	Vitebsk	4	(0)

International career^{‡}
2013–2016	Belarus U21	15	(0)
- * Club domestic league appearances and goals as of 4 September 2026 ‡ National team caps and goals as of 7 September 2016

Artyom Sergeyevich Gurenko (Belarusian: Арцём Сяргеевіч Гурэнка; Russian: Артём Сергеевич Гуренко; born 18 June 1994) is a Belarusian footballer who plays for Vitebsk.

== Career ==
Before 2017 season, Gurenko moved from Lithuanian vice-champions Trakai to other A Lyga side Sūduva, but he left the club on 26 May 2017 by mutual agreement.

In March 2019 he returned to Lithuania and became a member of Riteriai (former FK Trakai). In August left FK Riteriai.

== Honours ==
Sūduva Marijampolė

- A Lyga champion: 2017

== Family ==
He is a son of Belarusian coach and former footballer Sergei Gurenko.
