= FC Stumbras =

Lithuanian football club

Stumbras
- Full name: Football Club Stumbras Kaunas
- Founded: 2013
- Dissolved: 2019
- Shareholders: Richard Walsh; Mariano Barreto; Mark Lehnett; Carlos Olavo
- 2019: 8th (defunct)
- Website: www.fcstumbras.lt
Home colours	Away colours

Football Club Stumbras was a professional football club, based in Kaunas, Lithuania, which played in A Lyga, the top tier of Lithuanian football. Founded in 2013 on the basis of the NFA, the club has reached the heights of Lithuanian football in a fairly short period of time. It became infamous for one-sided footballer contracts. The club stopped functioning mid-season in 2019 after the owner pulled out the funds. The club played its home matches at the Darius and Girėnas Stadium (capacity 9,180) and used the NFA stadium in Kaunas (capacity 500) as an alternative.

== Name history ==
- 2013 – FC Stumbras Kaunas

== History ==
The club was established in 2013 on the basis of the Nacionalinė Futbolo Akademija team, adopting the name FC Stumbras and playing in II Lyga Southern Zone. The majority of the team's players were under 20 years old. Stumbras finished 2nd in the league and were promoted to I Lyga for the next year.

In 2014 FC Stumbras was able to sign a few more experienced players to go with their youth, most notably former national team striker and Kaunas native Artūras Rimkevičius. Stumbras started out the season strongly winning the first 8 matches. In July 2014, during the break, it was announced that 3 starting squad players Martynas Zaleckis, Klaidas Janonis and Klaudijus Upstas would leave the team, Rolandas Čepkauskas becoming the new head coach was announced a few days after. FC Stumbras went on to finish the regular season 3rd, making it to the second phase. After beating FK Nevėžis 4–1 in the last match of the season, Stumbras secured 1st place in the league and Artūras Rimkevičius was declared top goal scorer with 26. The last team to represent the second largest city in Lithuania in A Lyga was FBK Kaunas in 2012. FC Stumbras chairman Vytautas Vaškūnas confirmed that the club would use their right to play in the top Lithuanian league in 2015 and Kaunas would have a team in A Lyga once again, he also confirmed the club would bring back Rimkevičius and would most likely strengthen the squad even more the following season.

Stumbras made it official that they would like to join the premier Lithuanian football league for the 2015 season, on the second check up Stumbras was accepted. Getting ready for the 2015 season Stumbras already proved their worth playing matches against Lithuanian and foreign clubs, losing only once to Estonian Champions FC Levadia 1–0. On 28 January 2015, it was announced that 6 new players would join the club Nerijus Mačiulis, Tomas Snapkauskas, Mantvydas Eiza, Martynas Dapkus, Giedrius Kvedaras and Aleksandr Sikorskiy, later Darius Gvildys was announced as new head coach. Before the start of the season, Stumbras management surprised everyone when announcing that fans are welcome to watch them play for free for their home matches. On 28 February 2015, FC Stumbras debuted in A Lyga beating FK Šiauliai 3–1 in Kaunas.

Stumbras reached the final of the 2017 Lithuanian Football Cup and on 24 September 2017 beat FK Žalgiris 1–0 to secure the trophy. In the 2018 Lithuanian Football Cup, the club reached the final again, but could not defend the title, as they lost 0–3 against Žalgiris.

In 2019 Stumbras started the season very well by winning against FK Sūduva Marijampolė and FK Žalgiris Vilnius, claiming the top position of the A Lyga table. However, after the first half of the season the club ran into financial problems. The players and staff started leaving the team. The club was stripped of the place in 2019–20 UEFA Europa League and it's A Lyga license revoked. The club became defunct shortly afterwards.

== Stadium ==
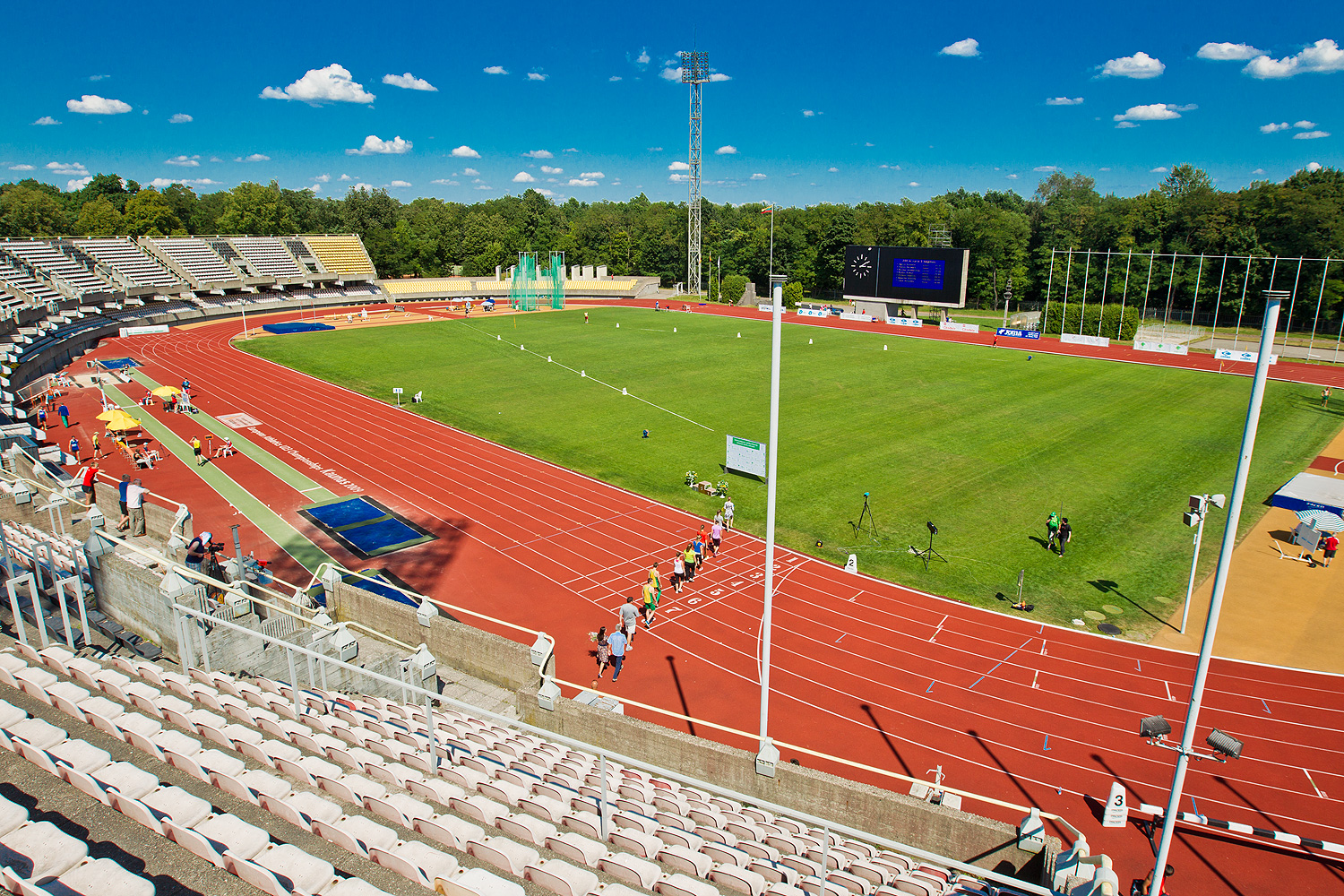
Darius and Girėnas Stadium

The club plays its home matches at the Darius and Girėnas Stadium. Stadium is a multi-use stadium in the Ąžuolynas park in Žaliakalnis district of Kaunas, Lithuania. The all-seater stadium holds 9,180. In 1998 the stadium was renovated according to UEFA regulations, and in 2005 it was modernised with the installation of the biggest stadium television screen in the Baltic states.

== Crest and colours ==
Only in 2013 after adapting the name Stumbras, the crest came along with it. It features a blue bison with a football being squashed under its leg on the background of a white shield with red borders and then placed on another shield which is blue with white text saying FC Stumbras at the top and Kaunas in smaller text under it. The choice of name and branding for the club is believed to be a reference to the historic coat of arms of Kaunas, which from 1935 to 1992 featured a white bison instead of an aurochs.

Since the beginning, the club has used the colors blue and white on their kits. The logo contained some red; at the start of the 2015 season the club played its debut match with new kits that introduced the color red to their uniforms.

=== Kit manufacturers ===
- 2013–2014 Adidas
- 2015–2019 Hummel

=== Kit evolution ===
- Home kit: blue shirt, blue shorts and white socks. Signs and details on shirts and shorts are white.

Traditional home kit	2013–2016 Away kit	Away kit in 2017 season	Away kit in 2018 season	Goalkeeper's kit 2018 Home

== Achievements ==
- LFF I Lyga Championship
  - Champions (1): 2014
- Lithuanian Cup
  - Winners (1): 2017
  - Runners-up (1): 2018

== Participation in Lithuanian championships ==
- 2013 II Lyga (Southern Zone) – 2nd
- 2014 I Lyga – 1st
- 2015 A Lyga – 7th
- 2016 A Lyga – 6th
- 2017 A Lyga - 7th
- 2018 A Lyga - 4th
- 2019 A Lyga - 8th (defunct in middle of the season)

== European record ==
As of July 2018

Season	Competition	Round	Club	Home	Away	Agg.
2018–19	UEFA Europa League	1QR	(Cyprus) Apollon Limassol	1−0	0–2	1–2

Notes

- QR: Qualifying round

== Last squad before dissolving ==
As of 4 July 2019

Note: Flags indicate national team as defined under FIFA eligibility rules; some limited exceptions apply. Players may hold more than one non-FIFA nationality.

No.	Pos.	Nation	Player
2	DF	LTU	Rokas Rasimavičius
3	MF	BRA	Matheus Bissi
4	DF	POR	André Almeida
5	DF	LTU	Arnas Paura
6	MF	UKR	Yehor Kondratyuk
8	MF	LTU	Elvinas Navickas
9	MF	GEO	Levan Macharashvili
10	MF	LTU	Domantas Antanavičius
13	MF	LTU	Simas Gedžiūnas
14	MF	LTU	Lukas Čepkauskas
17	MF	POR	Antonio Belo
19	MF	NGR	Gavi Thompson

No.	Pos.	Nation	Player
20	DF	MEX	Gerardo Alonso
21	MF	UKR	Denys Pidruchnyi
23	DF	LTU	Deividas Raulinaitis
27	MF	MDA	Andrei Ciofu
33	MF	LTU	Tanas Petukauskas
40	GK	LTU	Tomas Raudonikis
80	MF	LTU	Arnas Borodinas
91	GK	LTU	Giedrius Kvedaras
94	MF	BRA	Mateus Gama
99	FW	GUI	Alsény Bah
—	MF	KAZ	Demiyat Slambekov

== Staff ==
As of 5 March 2019.

Position	Name
President	(Republic of Ireland) Richard Walsh
Chief Operating Officer	(Republic of Ireland) Brian Forde
Director	(Lithuania) Karolis Dieninis
Director of football	(Lithuania) Giedrius Klevinskas
Head coach	(Portugal) João Luís Martins
Assistant coach	(Portugal) Pedro Miranda
Coach	(Portugal) Luis Guilherme Morgado Rodrigues
Goalkeeping coach	(Lithuania) Artūras Ramoška
Physio	(Portugal) Artur Pereira

== Managers ==
- (Lithuania) Gerhardas Kvedaras (2010–2014)
- (Lithuania) Rolandas Čepkauskas (2014–2015)
- (Lithuania) Darius Gvildys (2015–2016)
- (Portugal) Mariano Barreto (2016–2018)
- (Portugal) João Luís Martins (2019)

== Partnership ==
- (Portugal) Benfica
- (Portugal) Sporting CP
