= 2016 FK Žalgiris season =

Žalgiris
2016 season
- Chairwoman: Vilma Venslovaitienė
- Manager: Valdas Dambrauskas
- Stadium: LFF Stadionas
- SMSCredit.lt A Lyga: Winners
- LFF Sportland Supercup: Winners
- LFF Cup (15–16): Winners
- LFF Cup (16): Winners
- UEFA Champions League (16–17): Second Qualifying Round
- Top goalscorer: League: Andrija Kaluđerović (20 goals); All: Andrija Kaluđerović (23 goals)
- Highest home attendance: 4,100 (Jul. 13 vs. Astana)
- Lowest home attendance: 350 (Apr. 27 vs. Stumbras)
- Average home league attendance: 1,061
- Biggest win: Radviliškis 0–7 Žalgiris
- Biggest defeat: Žalgiris 1–3 Trakai
Home colours	Away colours

The 2016 season is FK Žalgiris 7th consecutive season in the top flight of Lithuanian football and 3rd consecutive as A Lyga title defenders. They also participated in the Lithuanian Cup, the SuperCup and entered the UEFA Champions League at the second qualifying round stage.

After winning the 2015–16 Lithuanian Football Cup, the club has achieved the longest active consecutive domestic cup run in Europe with five victories in a row. After another consecutive win in the 2016 LFF Cup, they extended the record to six victories, while also setting a new Lithuanian record – winning two domestic cups in a single calendar year.

Žalgiris were crowned champions for the fourth year in a row on 30 October after a 2–0 win against Atlantas.

After the season, club leaders received multiple personal awards. Long time club servant Mantas Kuklys was included among the final seven candidates to win Lithuanian footballer of the year award and remained fourth overall. Furthermore, he was elected as the best player in Lithuania, managing to beat teammates Andrija Kaluđerović and Vytautas Lukša, who respectively remained in second and fourth places. Despite joining only in the summer, Kaluđerović was also declared Fans Player of the Year – traditional award given by club supporters group Pietų IV. According to the fans, club defender Mamadou Mbodj remained in 2nd and 3rd place was taken by Kuklys. Justas Lasickas and Daniel Romanovskij remained respectively 3rd and 5th in the most promising player of the season elections; midfielder Matija Ljujić received the prize for the best goal of the season; and head coach Valdas Dambrauskas also received the coach of the year award.

The 2016 season concluded with a special event where the film "„Žalgiris-2016“. The year of triumph", about a historical season highlighted with the victory of four domestic titles was premiered.

== Players ==
Squad No.	Name	Nat.	Position(s)	Date of Birth (Age)	Signed from	Signed in
Goalkeepers
1	Armantas Vitkauskas	(Lithuania)	GK	23 March 1989 (age 37)	(Lithuania) FK Sūduva	2012
12	Karolis Čirba	(Lithuania)	GK	31 March 1997 (age 29)	Academy	2016
55	Saulius Klevinskas	(Lithuania)	GK	2 April 1984 (age 42)	(Russia) Torpedo Moscow	2015
Defenders
2	Linas Klimavičius	(Lithuania)	CB	10 April 1989 (age 37)	(Lithuania) FK Trakai	2016
5	Donovan Slijngard	(Netherlands)	LB	28 August 1987 (age 39)	(Netherlands) SC Cambuur	2015
6	Mamadou Mbodj	(Senegal)	CB	12 March 1993 (age 33)	(Serbia) Red Star Belgrade	2016
8	Egidijus Vaitkūnas	(Lithuania)	RB	8 August 1988 (age 38)	(Lithuania) FK Tauras	2010
18	Aldas Korsakas	(Lithuania)	RB	21 May 1996 (age 30)	Academy	2014
20	Dominykas Barauskas	(Lithuania)	DF	18 April 1997 (age 29)	Academy	2015
26	Marius Žaliūkas	(Lithuania)	CB	10 November 1983 (age 42)	(Scotland) Rangers F.C.	2016
71	Jonas Skinderis	(Lithuania)	DF	4 April 1997 (age 29)	(Lithuania) FK Panevėžys	2016
Midfielders
4	Marin Matoš	(Croatia)	CM	26 January 1989 (age 37)	(Croatia) NK Istra 1961	2016
7	Slavko Blagojević	(Croatia)	DM / CM	21 March 1987 (age 39)	(Croatia) RNK Split	2016
9	Jorge Chula	(Portugal)	RW / LW	13 February 1990 (age 36)	(Portugal) C.D. Aves	2015
21	Vytautas Lukša	(Lithuania)	RW / LW	14 August 1984 (age 42)	(Lithuania) FK Trakai	2015
22	Justas Lasickas	(Lithuania)	LW	6 October 1997 (age 28)	Academy	2014
23	Saulius Mikoliūnas	(Lithuania)	RB / RW / LW	2 May 1984 (age 42)	(Belarus) FC Shakhtyor Soligorsk	2016
27	Matija Ljujić	(Serbia)	CM / AM	28 October 1993 (age 32)	(Serbia) FK Rad	2016
75	Ernestas Stočkūnas	(Lithuania)	MF	26 April 1998 (age 28)	Academy	2015
77	Linas Pilibaitis	(Lithuania)	CM / AM / CF	5 April 1985 (age 41)	(Hungary) Győri ETO FC	2014
88	Mantas Kuklys	(Lithuania)	CM / AM	10 June 1987 (age 39)	(Belgium) KFC Turnhout	2012
Forwards
19	Edvinas Baniulis	(Lithuania)	CF	3 January 1997 (age 29)	Academy	2013
28	Julius Momkus	(Lithuania)	ST	28 February 1998 (age 28)	Academy	2016
33	Bahrudin Atajić	(Bosnia and Herzegovina)	AM / LW / RW / CF / SS	16 November 1993 (age 32)	(Finland) SJK Seinäjoki	2016
80	Elivelto	(Brazil)	CM / AM / LW / RW / SS	2 January 1992 (age 34)	(Lithuania) FK Ekranas	2015
99	Andrija Kaluđerović	(Serbia)	CF	5 July 1987 (age 39)	(Serbia) FK Rad	2016

== Transfers ==
=== Winter 2016 ===
==== In ====
Pos.	Player	Age	Moving from	Notes	Source
MF	(Brazil) Elton	26	(Romania) FC Voluntari	Free	
DF	(Lithuania) Marius Žaliūkas	32	(Scotland) Rangers F.C.	Free	
FW	(Lithuania) Simonas Stankevičius	20	(England) Leicester City F.C.	Undisclosed	
MF	(Croatia) Marin Matoš	26	(Croatia) NK Istra 1961	Free	
DF	(Senegal) Mamadou Mbodj	22	(Serbia) Red Star Belgrade	Free	
FW	(Bosnia and Herzegovina) Bahrudin Atajić	22	(Finland) SJK Seinäjoki	Free	
DF	(Lithuania) Linas Klimavičius	26	(Lithuania) FK Trakai	Free	
MF	(Lithuania) Saulius Mikoliūnas	31	(Belarus) FC Shakhtyor Soligorsk	Free	
MF	(Lithuania) Tautvydas Eliošius	23	(Lithuania) FK Kruoja Pakruojis	Free	

==== Out ====
Pos.	Player	Age	Moving to	Notes	Source
MF	(Belarus) Yury Kendysh	25	(Belarus) FC BATE Borisov	€150,000	
MF	(Lithuania) Deividas Šemberas	37	-	Retired	
DF	(Lithuania) Georgas Freidgeimas	28	(Kazakhstan) FC Irtysh Pavlodar	On loan until 2017	
FW	(Lithuania) Darvydas Šernas	31	(Turkey) Alanyaspor	Free	
DF	(Bosnia and Herzegovina) Semir Kerla	28	(Kazakhstan) FC Irtysh Pavlodar	Free	
DF	(Croatia) Andro Švrljuga	30	(Lithuania) FK Sūduva	Free	
DF	(Lithuania) Algis Jankauskas	33	(Lithuania) FK Sūduva	Free	
MF	(Lithuania) Paulius Janušauskas	26	(Lithuania) FK Sūduva	Free	
FW	(France) Serge Nyuiadzi	24	(Turkey) 1461 Trabzon	Free	
FW	(Cyprus) Kristis Andreou	21	(Cyprus) Ayia Napa F.C.	Free	
FW	(Brazil) Eliandro	25	(Brazil) Batatais Futebol Clube	Free	
FW	(Lithuania) Darius Kazubovičius	21	(Latvia) FK RFS	On loan until 2017	

=== Summer 2016 ===
==== In ====
Pos.	Player	Age	Moving from	Notes	Source
FW	(Serbia) Andrija Kaluđerović	28	(Serbia) FK Rad	Free	
MF	(Serbia) Matija Ljujić	22	(Serbia) FK Rad	Free	
MF	(Croatia) Slavko Blagojević	29	(Croatia) RNK Split	Free	
MF	(Lithuania) Jonas Skinderis	19	(Lithuania) FK Panevėžys	Undisclosed	

==== Out ====
Pos.	Player	Age	Moving to	Notes	Source
DF	(Lithuania) Lukas Valvonis	18	(Lithuania) FK Utenis	On loan until December 2016	
MF	(Lithuania) Daniel Romanovskij	19	(Lithuania) FK Utenis	On loan until 2017	
MF	(Brazil) Elton	26	(Romania) Pandurii Târgu Jiu	Free	
FW	(Brazil) Lucas Gaúcho	25	(Japan) Thespakusatsu Gunma	Free	
MF	(Lithuania) Tautvydas Eliošius	24	(Lithuania) FK Lietava	On loan until 2017	
FW	(Lithuania) Simonas Stankevičius	20	(Croatia) HNK Šibenik	On loan until 2017	

== Pre-season and friendlies ==
16 January 2016 Friendly	FK Žalgiris (Lithuania)	1–0	(Poland) Jagiellonia	Vilnius, Lithuania
13:30 EET (UTC+2)	Darius Kazubovičius 90'			Stadium: Sportima Arena

23 January 2016 Friendly	FK Žalgiris (Lithuania)	1–0	(Latvia) FK Liepāja	Vilnius, Lithuania
20:30 EET (UTC+2)	Georgas Freidgeimas 70'			Stadium: Sportima Arena

26 January 2016 Friendly	FK Žalgiris (Lithuania)	0–1	(Latvia) FS METTA	Vilnius, Lithuania
12:30 EET (UTC+2)			Artūrs Švalbe 89'	Stadium: Sportima Arena

30 January 2016 Friendly	FK Žalgiris (Lithuania)	5–1	(Latvia) FK Spartaks	Vilnius, Lithuania
20:30 EET (UTC+2)	Bahrudin Atajić 6' 44'; Tautvydas Eliošius 13' 37'; Vytautas Lukša 46'		Sergej Vorobjov 75'	Stadium: Sportima Arena

3 February 2016 Friendly	FC Minsk (Belarus)	0–1	(Lithuania) FK Žalgiris	Minsk, Belarus
15:00 FET (UTC+3)			Bahrudin Atajić 52'

6 February 2016 Friendly	FK Žalgiris (Lithuania)	1–2	(Latvia) FK Jelgava	Vilnius, Lithuania
20:30 EET (UTC+2)	Linas Pilibaitis 82'		Verners Zalaks 51'; Andrejs Kovaļovs 56' (pen.)	Stadium: Sportima Arena

11 February 2016 Friendly	FK Žalgiris (Lithuania)	1–1	(Poland) Wigry Suwałki	Vilnius, Lithuania
12:30 EET (UTC+2)	Daniel Romanovskij 70'; Linas Pilibaitis (red card) 76'; Egidijus Vaitkūnas (red card) 76'		Bartosz Biel 68'	Stadium: Sportima Arena

3 February 2016 Friendly	FC Flora (Estonia)	1–2	(Lithuania) FK Žalgiris	Tallinn, Estonia
20:00 EET (UTC+2)	Maksim Gussev 35'		Bahrudin Atajić 44'; Marin Matoš 74'	Stadium: EJL Sisehall

21 February 2016 Friendly	FC Flora (Estonia)	0–3	(Lithuania) FK Žalgiris	Tallinn, Estonia
13:15 EET (UTC+2)			Elivelto 4'; Simonas Stankevičius 30'; Saulius Mikoliūnas 69'	Stadium: EJL Sisehall

30 June 2016 Friendly	HNK Hajduk Split (Croatia)	2–1	(Lithuania) FK Žalgiris	Slovenske Konjice, Slovenia
18:00 CEST (UTC+2)	Ignacio Maganto 5'; Hrvoje Milić (yellow card) 75'; Jefferson (yellow card) 81'; Zvonimir Kožulj 85'	Report	Matija Ljujić (yellow card) 36' (yellow-red card) 36'; Vytautas Lukša (yellow card) 44'; Andrija Kaluđerović 59'; Saulius Mikoliūnas (yellow card) 77'	Stadium: Dobrava Stadium; Attendance: 20; Referee: (Slovenia) Vojko Goričan

3 July 2016 Friendly	FC Oleksandriya (Ukraine)	2–0	(Lithuania) FK Žalgiris	Beltinci, Slovenia
18:00 CEST (UTC+2)	Stanislav Kulish 8'	Report	Linas Klimavičius 33' (o.g.)	Stadium: Beltinci Sports Park

6 July 2016 Friendly	FC Terek Grozny (Russia)	2–1	(Lithuania) FK Žalgiris	Graz, Austria
18:00 CEST (UTC+2)	Bekim Balaj 60'; Magomed Mitrishev 75'	Report	Egidijus Vaitkūnas 72'	Stadium: Sportzentrum Graz-Weinzödl

8 October 2016 Friendly	Riga FC (Latvia)	3–2	(Lithuania) FK Žalgiris	Riga, Latvia
15:00 CEST (UTC+3)	Roberts Savaļnieks 25'; Sergei Shumeyko 27'; Džerards 75'	Report	Linas Pilibaitis 2'; Karolis Uzėla 90+3'	Stadium: Daugava Stadium

10 November 2016 Friendly	FC Dinamo Brest (Belarus)	2–1	(Lithuania) FK Žalgiris	Brest, Belarus
13:00 FET (UTC+3)	Latif Amadu 31'; Jahongir Ergashev 86'	Report	Elivelto 9'	Stadium: Yunost Stadium; Attendance: 100; Referee: (Belarus) Vitaly Sevostyanik

== Competitions ==
=== Lithuanian Supercup ===
28 February 2016	FK Žalgiris	4–1 (a.e.t.)	FK Trakai	Vilnius, Lithuania
15:30 CET (UTC+2)	Vytautas Lukša (yellow card) 45+1' (goal) 99'; Linas Pilibaitis 45+3'; Mamadou Mbodj (yellow card) 65'; Tautvydas Eliošius 112'; Mantas Kuklys 120+1' (pen.)	Report	David Arshakyan 22'; Arūnas Klimavičius (yellow card) 45+3'; Artem Gurenko (yellow card) 57'; Eugen Zasavitchi (yellow card) 68'; Deividas Česnauskis (yellow card) 90+3'; Justinas Januševskij (yellow card) 116'; Marius Rapalis (red card) 120'	Stadium: Sportima Arena; Attendance: 3,118; Referee: Jurij Paškovskij

=== A Lyga ===
==== Results summary ====
Overall								Home						Away					
Pld	W	D	L	GF	GA	GD	Pts	W	D	L	GF	GA	GD	W	D	L	GF	GA	GD
33	24	4	5	74	29	+45	76	13	2	2	39	16	+23	11	2	3	35	13	+22

Source: Competitive matches

==== Results by round ====
Round	1	2	3	4	5	6	7	8	9	10	11	12	13	14	15	16	17	18	19	20	21	22	23	24	25	26	27	28	29	30	31	32	33
Ground	H	A	H	A	H	A	H	A	H	A	H	A	H	A	H	A	H	A	H	A	H	A	H	A	H	A	H	A	A	H	A	H	H
Result	W	W	W	W	D	L	W	L	W	L	W	W	W	D	W	W	W	W	W	W	W	W	W	D	W	W	L	W	W	W	W	D	L
Position	2	1	1	1	1	3	2	3	2	4	3	3	2	2	2	2	1 (Note: Match was postponed and played after 23rd tour)	1	1	1	1	1	1	1	1	1	1	1	1	1	1	1	1

Source: Competitive matches
A = Away; H = Home; W = Win; D = Draw; L = Loss

==== Regular season ====
===== League table =====
Pos	Team	Pld	W	D	L	GF	GA	GD	Pts	Qualification or relegation
1	Žalgiris Vilnius	28	21	3	4	62	22	+40	66	Qualification to Championship round
2	Trakai	28	18	4	6	47	22	+25	58	Qualification to Championship round
3	Sūduva Marijampolė	28	15	6	7	42	32	+10	51 (Note: Head-to-head record: Sūduva–Atlantas 1–0, Atlantas–Sūduva 1–2, Sūduva–Atlantas 3–3, Atlantas–Sūduva 2–1.)	Qualification to Championship round
4	Atlantas	28	15	6	7	38	25	+13	51	Qualification to Championship round
5	Lietava Jonava	28	7	8	13	28	44	−16	29	Qualification to Championship round

Source: UEFA Soccerway
Rules for classification: 1) Points; 2) Head-to-head points; 3) Head-to-head goal difference; 4) Head-to-head goals scored; 5) Head-to-head matches won 6) Goal difference; 7) Goals scored; 8) Matches won.

===== Matches =====
2 March 2016 1	FK Žalgiris	2–0	FK Trakai	Vilnius, Lithuania
18:00 CET (UTC+2)	Bahrudin Atajić (penalty missed) 13' 46', 57'; Elton (yellow card) 37'; Tautvydas Eliošius (yellow card) 40'	Report	Eugen Zasavitchi (yellow card) 22'; Artem Gurenko (yellow card) 24'; Nerijus Valskis (yellow card) 43'; Martynas Dapkus (yellow card) 74'	Stadium: Sportima Arena; Attendance: 1,500; Referee: Gediminas Mažeika

12 March 2016 2	FC Stumbras	3–6	FK Žalgiris	Kaunas, Lithuania
13:00 EET (UTC+2)	Andrius Račkus 8'; Klaidas Janonis (yellow card) 17'; Kennedy Eriba 53' (yellow card) 54'; Lukas Baranauskas (yellow card) 63'; Klaudijus Upstas (yellow card) 73'; Martynas Zaleckis 83'	Report	Egidijus Vaitkūnas 2'; Bahrudin Atajić 9', 32'; Linas Pilibaitis 19'; Mantas Kuklys 37'; Marin Matoš (yellow card) 70'; Elivelto 78'	Stadium: NFA Stadium; Attendance: 600; Referee: Edmundas Gaigalas

16 March 2016 3	FK Žalgiris	3–2	FK Sūduva	Vilnius, Lithuania
18:00 EET (UTC+2)	Mamadou Mbodj 50'; Linas Pilibaitis (yellow card) 51'; Donovan Slijngard (yellow card) 53'; Saulius Mikoliūnas 79'; Mantas Kuklys 90' (pen.); Elivelto (yellow card) 90+1'	Report	Predrag Pavlović 16'; Ivan Kardum (yellow card) 32'; Andro Švrljuga (yellow card) 51'; Ernestas Veliulis (yellow card) 57'; Karolis Laukžemis 69'	Stadium: Sportima Arena; Attendance: 1,200; Referee: Sergėjus Slyva

19 March 2016 4	FK Utenis Utena	0–1	FK Žalgiris	Visaginas, Lithuania
14:00 EET (UTC+2)	Jevgenij Moroz (yellow card) 28'	Report	Elton 78'; Linas Klimavičius (yellow card) 90+2'	Stadium: Visaginas Stadium; Attendance: 150; Referee: Robertas Valikonis

2 April 2016 5	FK Žalgiris	2–2	FK Lietava Jonava	Vilnius, Lithuania
15:00 EEST (UTC+3)	Saulius Mikoliūnas (yellow card) 51'; Marius Žaliūkas 65'; Mantas Kuklys (yellow card) 72'; Egidijus Vaitkūnas (yellow card) 80'; Mamadou Mbodj 89'; Bahrudin Atajić (yellow card) 90+1'	Report	Dominykas Galkevičius 2' (pen.); Tomas Salamanavičius 12'; Aleksandar Šušnjar (yellow card) 33'; Giedrius Kvedaras (yellow card) 65'; Tadas Eliošius (yellow card) 72'; Laurynas Stonkus (yellow card) 75'	Stadium: Sportima Arena; Attendance: 1,000; Referee: Mindaugas Jackus

6 April 2016 6	FK Atlantas	2–1	FK Žalgiris	Klaipėda, Lithuania
18:00 EEST (UTC+3)	Alexey Epifanov (yellow card) 41'; Maksimov 59'; Kazimeras Gnedojus 74'; Oleg Dmitriyev (yellow card) 90+4'	Report	Mamadou Mbodj 90+7'	Stadium: Klaipėda Artificial Football Pitch; Attendance: 1,100; Referee: Gediminas Mažeika

16 April 2016 7	FK Žalgiris	3–0	FK Kauno Žalgiris	Vilnius, Lithuania
16:00 EEST (UTC+3)	Linas Pilibaitis 28' (pen.); Egidijus Vaitkūnas (yellow card) 54'; Simonas Stankevičius 56'; Bahrudin Atajić (yellow card) 64'; Lucas Gaúcho 79'	Report	Lukas Sendžikas (yellow card) 26' (yellow-red card) 67'; Tomas Bučma (red card) 50'; Ignas Dedura (yellow card) 50'	Stadium: LFF Stadium; Attendance: 700; Referee: Donatas Rumšas

20 April 2016 8	FK Trakai	1–0	FK Žalgiris	Vilnius, Lithuania
19:00 EEST (UTC+3)	David Arshakyan 15'	Report		Stadium: LFF Stadium; Attendance: 400; Referee: Sergėjus Slyva

27 April 2016 9	FK Žalgiris	2–0	FC Stumbras	Vilnius, Lithuania
19:00 EEST (UTC+3)	Mantas Kuklys 45' (pen.); Saulius Mikoliūnas (yellow card) 59'; Vytautas Lukša 90'	Report	Rimvydas Sadauskas (yellow card) 44'; Tomas Snapkauskas (yellow card) 82'	Stadium: LFF Stadium; Attendance: 350; Referee: Manfredas Lukjančukas

4 May 2016 10	FK Sūduva	1–0	FK Žalgiris	Marijampolė, Lithuania
18:00 EEST (UTC+3)	Paulius Janušauskas (yellow card) 16'; Ernestas Veliulis 25'	Report		Stadium: ARVI Football Arena; Attendance: 1,100; Referee: Donatas Rumšas

8 May 2016 11	FK Žalgiris	2–0	FK Utenis Utena	Vilnius, Lithuania
15:00 EEST (UTC+3)	Egidijus Vaitkūnas (yellow card) 25'; Marin Matoš 52'; Vytautas Lukša (yellow card) 70' (goal) 90+4'	Report	Benas Spietinis (yellow card) 18'	Stadium: LFF Stadium; Attendance: 730; Referee: Darius Petraška

18 May 2016 12	FK Lietava Jonava	0–1	FK Žalgiris	Jonava, Lithuania
18:00 EEST (UTC+3)	Aleksandar Šušnjar (yellow card) 81'	Report	Marin Matoš (yellow card) 37'; Linas Klimavičius 42'	Stadium: Central Stadium of Jonava; Attendance: 1,100; Referee: Vijūnas Vasiliauskas

21 May 2016 13	FK Žalgiris	1–0	FK Atlantas	Vilnius, Lithuania
17:00 EEST (UTC+3)	Mamadou Mbodj 18'; Elivelto (yellow card) 59'	Report	Maksimov (yellow card) 18'; Markas Beneta (yellow card) 78'	Stadium: LFF Stadium; Attendance: 900; Referee: Sergėjus Slyva

9 June 2016 14	FK Kauno Žalgiris	1–1	FK Žalgiris	Kaunas, Lithuania
19:30 EEST (UTC+3)	Pijus Širvys 62'; Edvinas Kloniūnas (yellow card) 90+2'	Report	Justas Lasickas 46'	Stadium: Darius and Girėnas Stadium; Attendance: 300; Referee: (Northern Ireland) Evan Boyce

15 June 2016 15	FK Žalgiris	3–1	FK Trakai	Vilnius, Lithuania
18:00 EEST (UTC+3)	Linas Pilibaitis 46', 62'; Matija Ljujić (yellow card) 71' (goal) 72'	Report	Dzmitry Rekish 85'	Stadium: LFF Stadium; Attendance: 550; Referee: Robertas Valikonis

24 June 2016 16	FC Stumbras	0–5	FK Žalgiris	Kaunas, Lithuania
20:30 EEST (UTC+3)	Giorgio Russo (yellow card) 60'; Ainas Bareikis (yellow card) 86'	Report	Egidijus Vaitkūnas 6'; Linas Pilibaitis 17', 48'; Marin Matoš 40'; Andrija Kaluđerović 50'; Mantas Kuklys (yellow card) 74'; Donovan Slijngard (yellow card) 80'	Stadium: Darius and Girėnas Stadium; Attendance: 100; Referee: Manfredas Lukjančukas

23 July 2016 18	FK Utenis Utena	2–4	FK Žalgiris	Utena, Lithuania
18:30 EEST (UTC+3)	Kiril Levšin 6'; Yuriy Vereshchak 23'; Gabrielius Zagurskas (yellow card) 39'	Report	Andrija Kaluđerović 18', 37', 83'; Saulius Mikoliūnas (yellow card) 36'; Linas Pilibaitis 51' (yellow card) 66'; Slavko Blagojević (yellow card) 80'	Stadium: Utenis Stadium; Attendance: 475; Referee: Darius Petraška

27 July 2016 19	FK Žalgiris	4–1	FK Lietava Jonava	Vilnius, Lithuania
19:30 EEST (UTC+3)	Andrija Kaluđerović 8', 27', 51'; Bahrudin Atajić (yellow card) 46'; Mamadou Mbodj 63'	Report	Tomas Salamanavičius (yellow card) 65'; Tadas Eliošius 86'	Stadium: LFF Stadium; Attendance: 800; Referee: Robertas Šmitas

2 August 2016 20	FK Atlantas	0–1	FK Žalgiris	Klaipėda, Lithuania
18:30 EEST (UTC+3)	Aleksey Epifanov (yellow card) 17'; Vytas Gašpuitis (yellow card) 27'; Ovidijus Verbickas (yellow card) 71'; Maksimov (yellow card) 86'; Oleg Dmitriyev (yellow card) 90+1'	Report	Egidijus Vaitkūnas (yellow card) 21'; Andrija Kaluđerović (yellow card) 39' (goal) 87'; Elivelto (yellow card) 67' (yellow-red card) 83'; Jorge Chula (yellow card) 90+1'	Stadium: Klaipėdos centrinis stadionas Attendance: 1,000; Referee: Gediminas Mažeika

11 August 2016 21	FK Žalgiris	3–1	FK Kauno Žalgiris	Vilnius, Lithuania
19:30 EEST (UTC+3)	Linas Pilibaitis 2'; Bahrudin Atajić 25'; Andrija Kaluđerović 83'	Report	Rokas Sikorskis 55'; Leonid Mushnikov (yellow card) 70'	Stadium: LFF Stadium; Attendance: 500; Referee: Vijūnas Vasiliauskas

17 August 2016 22	FK Trakai	1–2	FK Žalgiris	Vilnius, Lithuania
18:00 EEST (UTC+3)	Arūnas Klimavičius (yellow card) 52'; Nerijus Valskis 69' (pen.); Alyaksandr Bychanok (yellow card) 78'	Report	Andrija Kaluđerović 21', 50'; Slavko Blagojević (yellow card) 36'; Linas Pilibaitis (yellow card) 44'; Elivelto (red card) 76'; Saulius Klevinskas (yellow card) 86'	Stadium: LFF Stadium; Attendance: 250; Referee: Robertas Valikonis

24 August 2016 23	FK Žalgiris	3–1	FC Stumbras	Vilnius, Lithuania
19:30 EEST (UTC+3)	Matija Ljujić 21'; Mamadou Mbodj 34'; Slavko Blagojević (yellow card) 45+1'; Saulius Klevinskas (yellow card) 58'; Vytautas Lukša 64'	Report	Robertas Vėževičius (yellow card) 16'; Tomas Snapkauskas (yellow card) 70'; Cristian Alex 90+3'	Stadium: LFF Stadium; Attendance: 675; Referee: Edmundas Gaigalas

28 August 2016 17	FK Žalgiris	4–1	FK Sūduva	Vilnius, Lithuania
18:30 EEST (UTC+3)	Andrija Kaluđerović 5' (pen.); Vytautas Lukša 51'; Elivelto 89'; Marin Matoš 90+1'	Report	Tomas Radzinevičius 72'	Stadium: LFF Stadium; Attendance: 717; Referee: Gediminas Mažeika

7 September 2016 24	FK Sūduva	0–0	FK Žalgiris	Marijampolė, Lithuania
18:00 EEST (UTC+3)	Algis Jankauskas (yellow card) 53'; Povilas Leimonas (yellow card) 57'; Andro Švrljuga (yellow card) 76'	Report	Matija Ljujić (yellow card) 62'	Stadium: ARVI Football Arena; Attendance: 720; Referee: Donatas Rumšas

15 September 2016 25	FK Žalgiris	2–1	FK Utenis Utena	Vilnius, Lithuania
19:30 EEST (UTC+3)	Justas Lasickas (yellow card) 49'; Elivelto 64'; Linas Klimavičius (yellow card) 77'; Mantas Kuklys 86'; Vytautas Lukša (yellow card) 90'	Report	Daniel Romanovskij 81'; Gabrielius Zagurskas (yellow card) 84'; Ivan Lukaniuk (yellow card) 90+2'	Stadium: LFF Stadium; Attendance: 700; Referee: Donatas Šimėnas

20 September 2016 26	FK Lietava Jonava	0–4	FK Žalgiris	Jonava, Lithuania
16:30 EEST (UTC+3)	Eisvinas Utyra (yellow card) 36'; Artūras Rocys (yellow card) 40'	Report	Elivelto (yellow card) 12'; Saulius Mikoliūnas 48'; Bahrudin Atajić 56', 66', 78'	Stadium: Central Stadium of Jonava; Attendance: 800; Referee: Gediminas Mažeika

1 October 2016 27	FK Žalgiris	0–1	FK Atlantas	Vilnius, Lithuania
18:00 EEST (UTC+3)	Saulius Mikoliūnas (yellow card) 76'; Mamadou Mbodj (yellow card) 83'	Report	Rolandas Baravykas (yellow card) 30'; Rokas Gedminas (yellow card) 37'; Andrius Bartkus (yellow card) 71'; Ovidijus Verbickas 84' (pen.)	Stadium: LFF Stadium; Attendance: 810; Referee: Manfredas Lukjančukas

16 October 2016 28	FK Kauno Žalgiris	0–2	FK Žalgiris	Kaunas, Lithuania
14:00 EEST (UTC+3)	Andrius Velička (yellow card) 33'; Ignas Dedura (yellow card) 45'; Ernestas Pilypas (yellow card) 60'	Report	Saulius Mikoliūnas 49'; Linas Pilibaitis 90+2'	Stadium: Darius and Girėnas Stadium; Referee: Darius Petraška

==== Championship round ====
===== League table =====
Pos	Team	Pld	W	D	L	GF	GA	GD	Pts	Qualification or relegation
1	Žalgiris Vilnius (C)	33	24	4	5	74	29	+45	76	Qualification to Champions League second qualifying round (Note: Žalgiris Vilnius qualified for the Europa League first qualifying round by winning the 2016 Lithuanian Football Cup. However, since they qualified for European competition based on their league position, the spot awarded to the cup winners was passed down the league.)
2	Trakai	33	20	7	6	55	26	+29	67	Qualification to Europa League first qualifying round
3	Sūduva Marijampolė	33	17	7	9	55	41	+14	58	Qualification to Europa League first qualifying round
4	Atlantas	33	16	8	9	42	32	+10	56	Qualification to Europa League first qualifying round
5	Stumbras Kaunas	33	8	9	16	43	63	−20	33	
6	Lietava Jonava	33	8	8	17	35	58	−23	32	

Source: UEFA Soccerway
Rules for classification: 1) Points; 2) Play-off (only if deciding champion); 3) Head-to-head points; 4) Head-to-head goal difference; 5) Head-to-head goals scored; 6) Head-to-head matches won 7) Goal difference; 8) Goals scored; 9) Matches won.
(C) Champions

===== Matches =====
22 October 2016 1	FK Lietava Jonava	1–4	FK Žalgiris	Jonava, Lithuania
13:00	Valdemaras Borovskis (yellow card) 75'; Dominykas Galkevičius 85'	Report	Andrija Kaluđerović 14', 41', 46'; Vytautas Lukša 82'	Stadium: Central Stadium of Jonava; Attendance: 150; Referee: Mindaugas Jackus

30 October 2016 2	FK Žalgiris	2–0	FK Atlantas	Vilnius, Lithuania
15:00	Matija Ljujić 34'; Vytautas Lukša (yellow card) 41'; Saulius Mikoliūnas (yellow card) 63'; Justas Raziūnas 71' (o.g.)	Report	Šimkus (yellow card) 2'	Stadium: LFF Stadium; Attendance: 575; Referee: Robertas Šmitas

5 November 2016 3	FK Sūduva	1–3	FK Žalgiris	Marijampolė, Lithuania
14:00	Nermin Jamak (yellow card) 26'; Marius Činikas (yellow card) 38'; Tomas Radzinevičius 54'	Report	Andrija Kaluđerović 37', 42'; Mamadou Mbodj (yellow card) 64'; Mantas Kuklys 71'	Stadium: ARVI Football Arena; Attendance: 500; Referee: Donatas Rumšas

18 November 2016 5	FK Žalgiris	2–2	FC Stumbras	Vilnius, Lithuania
19:15	Andrija Kaluđerović 25', 62'; Justas Lasickas (yellow card) 38'; Mantas Kuklys (yellow card) 73'; Matija Ljujić (yellow card) 73'; Saulius Mikoliūnas (yellow card) 79'	Report	Lukas Artimavičius (yellow card) 36'; Armanavičius 45+1'; Oumar Sissoko 82'; Matas Radžiukynas (yellow card) 90+1'	Stadium: Sportima Arena; Attendance: 850; Referee: Edmundas Gaigalas

26 November 2016 4	FK Žalgiris	1–3	FK Trakai	Vilnius, Lithuania
12:00	Mamadou Mbodj (yellow card) 34'; Slavko Blagojević (yellow card) 59'; Saulius Mikoliūnas (yellow card) 69'; Andrija Kaluđerović 81'; Linas Klimavičius (yellow card) 83'; Mantas Kuklys (yellow card) 90'	Report	Nerijus Valskis 24', 61' (yellow card) 59'; Eugen Zasavitchi 40'	Stadium: LFF Stadium; Attendance: 837; Referee: Gediminas Mažeika

=== LFF Taurė ===
==== 2015–16 LFF Taurė ====
All previous rounds were played during the 2015 FK Žalgiris season.

===== Semifinals =====
12 April 2016 First leg	FK Žalgiris	1–1	FC Stumbras	Vilnius, Lithuania
19:00 EEST (UTC+3)	Mamadou Mbodj (yellow card) 32'; Linas Pilibaitis 90+2'	Report	Giorgio Russo 66'	Stadium: LFF Stadium; Attendance: 600; Referee: Edmundas Gaigalas

24 April 2016 Second leg	FC Stumbras	0–2 (1–3 agg.)	FK Žalgiris	Kaunas, Lithuania
15:00 EEST (UTC+3)	Klaidas Janonis (yellow card) 2'	Report	Elton (yellow card) 22' (yellow-red card) 52'; Vytautas Lukša 32' (yellow card) 41' (goal) 83'; Saulius Mikoliūnas (yellow card) 78'	Stadium: NFA Stadium; Attendance: 300; Referee: Donatas Rumšas

===== Final =====
15 May 2016	FK Žalgiris	1–0 (a.e.t.)	FK Trakai	Telšiai, Lithuania
17:00 EEST (UTC+3)	Egidijus Vaitkūnas (yellow card) 96'; Linas Klimavičius 99'; Linas Pilibaitis (yellow card) 116'	Report	Deividas Česnauskis (yellow card) 57'; Vaidas Šilėnas (yellow card) 108'	Stadium: Telšiai Central Stadium; Attendance: 3,000; Referee: Edmundas Gaigalas

==== 2016 LFF Taurė ====
18 June 2016 Round of 32	FK Kauno Žalgiris	0–6	FK Žalgiris	Kaunas, Lithuania
19:30 EEST (UTC+3)		Report	Matija Ljujić 14', 50'; Vytautas Lukša 36'; Mantas Kuklys (yellow card) 37'; Andrija Kaluđerović 44'; Linas Pilibaitis 83', 86'	Stadium: NFA Stadium; Referee: Darius Petraška

6 August 2016 Round of 16	FK Palanga	0–4	FK Žalgiris	Palanga, Lithuania
18:00 EEST (UTC+3)	Mindaugas Bagužis (yellow card) 34' (yellow-red card) 47'; Mantas Perepliotovas (yellow card) 74'; Donatas Navikas (yellow card) 86'	Report	Elivelto 28', 50'; Linas Klimavičius 35'; Linas Pilibaitis 79'	Stadium: Palanga Central Stadium; Attendance: 800; Referee: Orestas Abramavičius

20 August 2016 Quarter-finals	ŠSPC Radviliškis	0–7	FK Žalgiris	Radviliškis, Lithuania
18:00 EEST (UTC+3)	Aurimas Šulnys (yellow card) 78'	Report	Marin Matoš 3'; Jorge Chula 10'; Elivelto 20', 77'; Julius Momkus 23', 31' (penalty missed) 84'; Saulius Mikoliūnas 44'	Stadium: Radviliškis Central Stadium; Attendance: 800; Referee: Mindaugas Jackus

11 September 2016 Semi-finals	FK Atlantas	1–2	FK Žalgiris	Klaipėda, Lithuania
19:00 EEST (UTC+3)	Vytas Gašpuitis 19'; Donatas Kazlauskas (yellow card) 64'	Report	Saulius Mikoliūnas 10'; Mantas Kuklys (yellow card) 39'; Egidijus Vaitkūnas (yellow card) 58'; Andrija Kaluđerović 90+2'	Stadium: Klaipėdos centrinis stadionas Attendance: 2,000; Referee: Gediminas Mažeika

25 September 2016 Final	FK Sūduva	0–2	FK Žalgiris	Klaipėda, Lithuania
14:00 EEST (UTC+3)	Tomas Radzinevičius (yellow card) 37'; Predrag Pavlović (yellow card) 41'; Algis Jankauskas (red card) 90'; Marius Činikas (red card) 90+3'; Vaidas Slavickas (red card) 90+3'	Report	Slavko Blagojević (yellow card) 27'; Mamadou Mbodj (yellow card) 62'; Andrija Kaluđerović 64' (yellow card) 90'; Mantas Kuklys 90+3' (pen.); Saulius Mikoliūnas (yellow card) 90+4'	Stadium: Klaipėdos centrinis stadionas Attendance: 1,248; Referee: Sergejus Slyva

=== UEFA Champions League ===
==== Second qualifying round ====
13 July 2016 First leg	FK Žalgiris (Lithuania)	0–0	(Kazakhstan) FC Astana	Vilnius, Lithuania
20:15 EEST (UTC+3)	Vytautas Lukša (yellow card) 70'	Report	Junior Kabananga (yellow card) 85'	Stadium: LFF Stadium; Attendance: 4,100; Referee: (Serbia) Vlado Glođović

20 July 2016 Second leg	FC Astana (Kazakhstan)	2–1 (2–1 agg.)	(Lithuania) FK Žalgiris	Astana, Kazakhstan
20:00 (UTC+6)	Marin Aničić 31', 90+2' (yellow card) 90+3'; Serikzhan Muzhikov (yellow card) 64'; Dmitri Shomko (yellow card) 80'	Report	Linas Klimavičius (yellow card) 42'; Elivelto 57'	Stadium: Astana Arena; Attendance: 18,449; Referee: (Switzerland) Sandro Schärer

== Statistics ==
=== Appearances and goals ===
No.	Pos	Nat	Player	Total		A Lyga		Supercup		LFF Taurė		Champions League	
No.	Pos	Nat	Player	Apps	Goals	Apps	Goals	Apps	Goals	Apps	Goals	Apps	Goals
Goalkeepers
1	GK	(Lithuania) LTU	Armantas Vitkauskas	26	0	19	0	1	0	6	0	0	0
12	GK	(Lithuania) LTU	Karolis Čirba	1	0	0	0	0	0	0+1	0	0	0
55	GK	(Lithuania) LTU	Saulius Klevinskas	18	0	14	0	0	0	2	0	2	0
Defenders
2	DF	(Lithuania) LTU	Linas Klimavičius	38	3	26+2	1	1	0	7	2	2	0
5	DF	(Netherlands) NED	Donovan Slijngard	39	0	30	0	1	0	6	0	2	0
6	DF	(Senegal) SEN	Mamadou Mbodj	42	6	33	6	1	0	5+1	0	2	0
8	DF	(Lithuania) LTU	Egidijus Vaitkūnas	37	2	27+1	2	1	0	6	0	2	0
18	DF	(Lithuania) LTU	Aldas Korsakas	3	0	2	0	0	0	1	0	0	0
20	DF	(Lithuania) LTU	Dominykas Barauskas	6	0	2+2	0	0	0	1+1	0	0	0
26	DF	(Lithuania) LTU	Marius Žaliūkas	18	1	7+4	1	0+1	0	4+1	0	0+1	0
71	DF	(Lithuania) LTU	Jonas Skinderis	2	0	0+1	0	0	0	1	0	0	0
Midfielders
4	MF	(Croatia) CRO	Marin Matoš	28	4	12+10	3	1	0	4+1	1	0	0
7	MF	(Croatia) CRO	Slavko Blagojević	18	0	12+2	0	0	0	2	0	2	0
9	MF	(Portugal) POR	Jorge Chula	11	1	2+5	0	0	0	3+1	1	0	0
21	MF	(Lithuania) LTU	Vytautas Lukša	41	9	28+3	5	1	1	5+2	3	2	0
22	MF	(Lithuania) LTU	Justas Lasickas	22	1	6+10	1	0+1	0	1+4	0	0	0
23	MF	(Lithuania) LTU	Saulius Mikoliūnas	37	5	19+8	3	1	0	7	2	2	0
27	MF	(Serbia) SRB	Matija Ljujić	22	5	11+4	3	0	0	3+2	2	0+2	0
75	DF	(Lithuania) LTU	Ernestas Stočkūnas	1	0	0	0	0	0	0+1	0	0	0
77	MF	(Lithuania) LTU	Linas Pilibaitis	38	14	20+10	9	1	1	4+2	4	1	0
88	MF	(Lithuania) LTU	Mantas Kuklys	40	7	29+2	5	1	1	6	1	2	0
Forwards
19	FW	(Lithuania) LTU	Edvinas Baniulis	0	0	0	0	0	0	0	0	0	0
28	FW	(Lithuania) LTU	Julius Momkus	3	2	0+2	0	0	0	1	2	0	0
33	FW	(Bosnia and Herzegovina) BIH	Bahrudin Atajić	32	8	16+8	8	1	0	4+2	0	0+1	0
80	FW	(Brazil) BRA	Elivelto	31	8	15+9	3	0+1	0	3+1	4	1+1	1
99	FW	(Serbia) SRB	Andrija Kaluđerović	24	23	18+1	20	0	0	3	3	2	0
Players transferred out during the season
7	MF	(Brazil) BRA	Elton	11	1	6+2	1	0+1	0	1+1	0	0	0
10	FW	(Brazil) BRA	Lucas Gaúcho	4	1	0+3	1	0	0	0+1	0	0	0
11	FW	(Lithuania) LTU	Simonas Stankevičius	12	1	5+3	1	0	0	1+3	0	0	0
13	MF	(Lithuania) LTU	Daniel Romanovskij	6	0	1+4	0	0	0	0+1	0	0	0
17	MF	(Lithuania) LTU	Tautvydas Eliošius	9	1	3+3	0	0+1	1	1+1	0	0	0

Source: Competitions

=== Goalscorers ===
Rank	No.	Pos	Nat	Name	A Lyga	Supercup	LFF Taurė	UEFA CL	Total
1	99	FW	(Serbia)	Andrija Kaluđerović	20	0	3	0	23
2	77	MF	(Lithuania)	Linas Pilibaitis	9	1	4	0	14
3	21	MF	(Lithuania)	Vytautas Lukša	5	1	3	0	9
4	33	FW	(Bosnia and Herzegovina)	Bahrudin Atajić	8	0	0	0	8
4	80	FW	(Brazil)	Elivelto	3	0	4	1	8
6	88	MF	(Lithuania)	Mantas Kuklys	5	1	1	0	7
7	6	DF	(Senegal)	Mamadou Mbodj	6	0	0	0	6
8	23	MF	(Lithuania)	Saulius Mikoliūnas	3	0	2	0	5
8	27	MF	(Serbia)	Matija Ljujić	3	0	2	0	5
10	4	MF	(Croatia)	Marin Matoš	3	0	1	0	4
11	2	DF	(Lithuania)	Linas Klimavičius	1	0	2	0	3
12	8	DF	(Lithuania)	Egidijus Vaitkūnas	2	0	0	0	2
12	28	FW	(Lithuania)	Julius Momkus	0	0	2	0	2
14	7	MF	(Brazil)	Elton	1	0	0	0	1
14	9	MF	(Portugal)	Jorge Chula	0	0	1	0	1
14	10	FW	(Brazil)	Lucas Gaúcho	1	0	0	0	1
14	11	FW	(Lithuania)	Simonas Stankevičius	1	0	0	0	1
14	17	MF	(Lithuania)	Tautvydas Eliošius	0	1	0	0	1
14	22	MF	(Lithuania)	Justas Lasickas	1	0	0	0	1
14	26	DF	(Lithuania)	Marius Žaliūkas	1	0	0	0	1
Own goal					1	0	0	0	1
Totals					74	4	25	1	104

=== Clean sheets ===
Rank	No.	Pos	Nat	Name	A Lyga	Supercup	LFF Taurė	UEFA CL	Total
1	1	GK	(Lithuania)	Armantas Vitkauskas	10	0	4	0	14
2	55	GK	(Lithuania)	Saulius Klevinskas	3	0	2	1	6
3	12	GK	(Lithuania)	Karolis Čirba	0	0	1	0	1
Totals					13	0	7	1	21

=== Disciplinary record ===
No.	Pos	Nat	Player	A Lyga			Supercup			LFF Taurė			UEFA CL			Total		
No.	Pos	Nat	Player	Booked	(yellow card) (yellow-red card)	Sent off (straight red)	Booked	(yellow card) (yellow-red card)	Sent off (straight red)	Booked	(yellow card) (yellow-red card)	Sent off (straight red)	Booked	(yellow card) (yellow-red card)	Sent off (straight red)	Booked	(yellow card) (yellow-red card)	Sent off (straight red)
2	DF	(Lithuania)	Linas Klimavičius	3									1			4	0	0
4	MF	(Croatia)	Marin Matoš	2												2	0	0
5	DF	(Netherlands)	Donovan Slijngard	2												2	0	0
6	DF	(Senegal)	Mamadou Mbodj	3			1			2						6	0	0
7	MF	(Brazil)	Elton	1							1					1	1	0
7	MF	(Croatia)	Slavko Blagojević	4						1						5	0	0
8	DF	(Lithuania)	Egidijus Vaitkūnas	4						2						6	0	0
9	MF	(Portugal)	Jorge Chula	1												1	0	0
17	MF	(Lithuania)	Tautvydas Eliošius	1												1	0	0
21	MF	(Lithuania)	Vytautas Lukša	3			1			1			1			6	0	0
22	MF	(Lithuania)	Justas Lasickas	2												2	0	0
23	MF	(Lithuania)	Saulius Mikoliūnas	7						2						9	0	0
27	MF	(Serbia)	Matija Ljujić	3												3	0	0
33	FW	(Bosnia and Herzegovina)	Bahrudin Atajić	3												3	0	0
55	GK	(Lithuania)	Saulius Klevinskas	2												2	0	0
77	MF	(Lithuania)	Linas Pilibaitis	3						1						4	0	0
80	FW	(Brazil)	Elivelto	3	1	1										3	1	1
88	MF	(Lithuania)	Mantas Kuklys	4						2						6	0	0
99	FW	(Serbia)	Andrija Kaluđerović	1						1						2	0	0
Totals				52	1	1	2	0	0	12	1	0	2	0	0	68	2	1

== Awards ==
=== A Lyga Player of the Year ===
(Lithuania) Mantas Kuklys
2nd	(Serbia) Andrija Kaluđerović
4th	(Lithuania) Vytautas Lukša

=== Fans' Player of the Season ===
(Serbia) Andrija Kaluđerović
2nd	(Senegal) Mamadou Mbodj
3rd	(Lithuania) Mantas Kuklys

=== A Lyga Goal of the Year ===
(Serbia) Matija Ljujić

=== Lithuania Coach of the Year ===
(Lithuania) Valdas Dambrauskas

=== A Lyga Team of the Week ===
The following players were named in the A lyga Team of the Week.

Player		Position(s)	Week(s)	Ref.
	Name	Position(s)	Week(s)	Ref.
(Serbia)	Andrija Kaluđerović	FW	18, 19, 20, 22, 29, 31, 32	
(Lithuania)	Armantas Vitkauskas	GK	14, 15	
(Bosnia and Herzegovina)	Bahrudin Atajić	MF/FW	1, 2, 7, 21, 26	
(Netherlands)	Donovan Slijngard	DF	1, 4, 13, 26, 28, 30	
(Lithuania)	Egidijus Vaitkūnas	DF	9, 16, 19, 20, 29	
(Brazil)	Elivelto	MF	2	
(Brazil)	Elton	MF	4	
(Lithuania)	Linas Klimavičius	DF	1, 12, 20	
(Lithuania)	Linas Pilibaitis	MF/FW	7, 15, 16, 18	
(Senegal)	Mamadou Mbodj	DF	3, 13, 15, 19, 31	
(Lithuania)	Mantas Kuklys	MF	9, 12, 13, 16, 19, 22, 25, 30, 31	
(Serbia)	Matija Ljujić	MF	28, 29	
(Lithuania)	Saulius Klevinskas	GK	22	
(Lithuania)	Saulius Mikoliūnas	DF/MF	24, 26, 28	
(Croatia)	Slavko Blagojević	MF	20, 31	
(Lithuania)	Vytautas Lukša	MF	1, 9, 11, 15, 21	

=== Fans' Player of the Month ===
Month	Nationality	Player	Position	Ref
March	Bosnia and Herzegovina	Bahrudin Atajić	FW	
April	Lithuania	Vytautas Lukša	MF	
May	Lithuania	Linas Klimavičius	DF	
June	Lithuania	Vytautas Lukša	MF	
July	Serbia	Andrija Kaluđerović	FW	
August	Lithuania	Vytautas Lukša	MF	
September	Serbia	Andrija Kaluđerović	FW	
October	Lithuania	Vytautas Lukša	MF	
