= 2017 Lithuanian Supercup =

- Event: Lithuanian Supercup
Žalgiris	Trakai
1	0
- Date: 26 February 2017
- Venue: Sportima Arena, Vilnius
- Man of the Match: Vytautas Lukša
- Referee: Robertas Valikonis (Lithuania)
- Attendance: 2,918

The 2017 Lithuanian Supercup (Lithuanian: LFF Supertaurė) was the 17th edition of the Lithuanian Supercup since its establishment in 1995, the annual Lithuanian football season-opening match contested by the winners of the previous season's top league and cup competitions (or league runner-up in case the league- and cup-winning club is the same). It took place on 26 February 2017 at the Sportima Arena in Vilnius, and was contested between Žalgiris, the 2016 A Lyga and 2016 Lithuanian Football Cup winners, and Trakai, the 2016 A Lyga runners-up.

Žalgiris were the defending champions having won the cup for four previous years.

Žalgiris won the tie 1–0 with substitute Mahamane Traoré scoring the only goal of the match in 76th minute after a critical mistake by Trakai goalkeeper Ignas Plūkas.

== Match ==
26 February 2017
14:45 EET (UTC+2)

Žalgiris	1–0	Trakai
Traoré 76'	Report; Video

Sportima Arena, Vilnius
Attendance: 2,918
Referee: Robertas Valikonis (Lithuania)

Žalgiris	Trakai

GK	1	(Lithuania) Armantas Vitkauskas
RB	8	(Lithuania) Egidijus Vaitkūnas (c)
CB	6	(Senegal) Mamadou Mbodj
CB	2	(Lithuania) Linas Klimavičius
LB	5	(Netherlands) Donovan Slijngard
CM	88	(Lithuania) Mantas Kuklys
CM	7	(Croatia) Slavko Blagojević
RW	21	(Lithuania) Vytautas Lukša	(substituted off) 83'
AM	27	(Serbia) Matija Ljujić	(substituted off) 46'
LW	80	(Brazil) Elivelto	(substituted off) 65'
CF	10	(Lithuania) Darvydas Šernas
Substitutes:
GK	55	(Lithuania) Saulius Klevinskas
DF	3	(Lithuania) Georgas Freidgeimas
DF	23	(Lithuania) Rolandas Baravykas
MF	13	(Lithuania) Saulius Mikoliūnas	(substituted in) 83'
MF	16	(Mali) Mahamane Traoré	(substituted in) 65'
MF	22	(Lithuania) Justas Lasickas
FW	9	(Bosnia and Herzegovina) Bahrudin Atajić	(substituted in) 46'
Manager:
(Lithuania) Valdas Dambrauskas

GK	13	(Lithuania) Ignas Plūkas
CB	15	(Lithuania) Justinas Januševskij
CB	47	(Belarus) Pavel Kruk	(yellow card) 72'	(substituted off) 83'
CB	24	(Lithuania) Arūnas Klimavičius
RM	7	(Lithuania) Deividas Česnauskis (c)		(substituted off) 62'
CM	4	(Lithuania) Modestas Vorobjovas		(substituted off) 77'
CM	23	(Ukraine) Mikhaylo Shyshka		(substituted off) 46'
LM	22	(Nigeria) Alma Wakili
RF	11	(Liberia) Oscar
CF	10	(Lithuania) Tadas Labukas
LF	79	(Russia) Yuri Mamaev		(substituted off) 46'
Substitutes:
GK	1	(Ukraine) Tymofiy Sheremeta
DF	33	(Lithuania) Valdemaras Borovskis		(substituted in) 62'
MF	21	(Lithuania) Vaidotas Šilėnas		(substituted in) 77'
MF	30	(Lithuania) Rokas Masenzovas
MF	49	(Lithuania) Svajūnas Čyžas		(substituted in) 83'
MF	77	(Belarus) Alyaksandr Bychanok		(substituted in) 46'
FW	95	(Lithuania) Darius Kazubovičius	(yellow card) 46'	(substituted in) 46'
Manager:
(Russia) Oleg Vasilenko

Assistant referees:
Algimantas Bagdonas (Lithuania)
Tadas Dunauskas (Lithuania)
Fourth official:
Dovydas Sužiedėlis (Lithuania)

Match rules

- 90 minutes.
- Penalty shoot-out if scores level.
- Seven named substitutes, of which up to five may be used.
