= Valdas Dambrauskas =

Lithuanian football manager (born 1977)

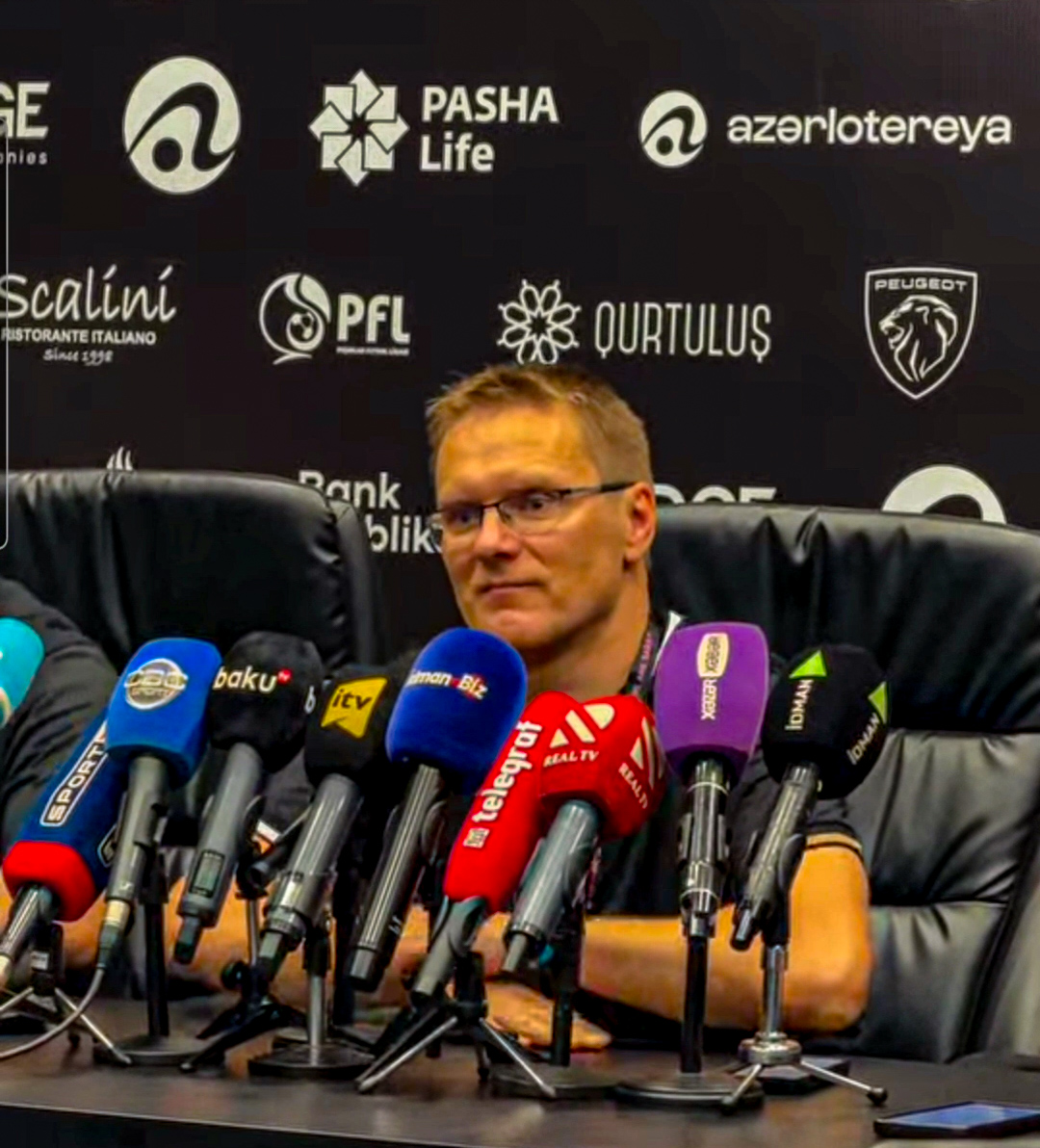
- Dambrauskas in 2026

Personal information
- Date of birth: 7 January 1977 (age 49)
- Place of birth: Pakruojis, Lithuania

Team information
- Current team: Sabah (manager)

Managerial career
- Years: Team
- 2007–2010: Kingsbury London Tigers
- 2009: Lithuania U17
- 2011–2012: Lithuania U19
- 2014: Ekranas
- 2014–2017: Žalgiris
- 2017–2020: RFS
- 2020–2021: Gorica
- 2021: Ludogorets Razgrad
- 2021–2022: Hajduk Split
- 2022–2023: OFI
- 2024: Omonia
- 2025: Diósgyőr
- 2025–: Sabah

Valdas Dambrauskas (born 7 January 1977) is a Lithuanian professional football manager who is currently the head coach of Azerbaijan Premier League club Sabah.

== Life ==
Dambrauskas was born and raised in Pakruojis, Lithuania, in a working-class family. His father worked in construction and his mother was a cook in a canteen. He was one of four children. His father died when Dambrauskas was 11, and he began working at a young age to help support his family.

As a child, Dambrauskas participated in several sports, including basketball, athletics and chess, before concentrating on football. He played football from the age of 17 to 23, reaching the third tier of Lithuanian football.

In 2002, aged 25, Dambrauskas appeared on the Lithuanian version of the television quiz show Šeši nuliai – milijonas (Six Zeros – A Million), based on Who Wants to Be a Millionaire?. He won 4,000 litas, a sum that was approximately equivalent to a year's salary for some Lithuanians at the time. He used the prize money to move to England with his partner, later his wife, and to begin a career in football coaching.

Before moving to England, Dambrauskas had obtained a degree in engineering. In England, he studied sport science and coaching at London Metropolitan University. During his studies, he worked in youth football, including at Fulham, Manchester United F.C. and Brentford F.C.. He subsequently pursued a master's degree at the Lithuanian Sports University.

Dambrauskas supported himself through various jobs while developing his coaching career in England. He worked as a shop assistant, delivered newspapers, worked in a kindergarten and later as a private childminder, using much of his income to pay for coaching courses and books.

In 2022, Dambrauskas was named an honorary ambassador of the Pakruojis region by the Pakruojis District Municipality.

== Managerial career ==
=== Early career ===
Dambrauskas worked as a coach at several youth academies in England, including Fulham, Manchester United and the Brentford Centre of Excellence. His first senior managerial position was with Kingsbury London Tigers in the Spartan South Midlands Football League Premier Division, where he led the team to its highest finish in club history. For his work, Dambrauskas received an award at the Active Westminster Awards. He was also head coach of the Lithuania national under-17 team between 2009 and 2010.

=== Ekranas ===
In December 2010, Dambrauskas joined Lithuanian champions Ekranas as an assistant coach to Lithuanian coach Valdas Urbonas. Together, they won domestic double in 2011 season, the Supercup and A Lyga titles in 2012 campaign, while also reaching the domestic cup final, where they lost to Žalgiris after penalties, and also placed 3rd in 2013. After Urbonas' resignation, he became head coach of the team. Despite scarce resources, he managed to place sixth in the 2014 season, even though this did not help the club, and it was forced to declare bankruptcy after the season had ended. He also managed the Lithuania under-19 team between 2011 and 2012.

=== Žalgiris ===
On 17 December 2014, Dambrauskas became new head coach of Lithuanian champions Žalgiris. Together with the team, he managed to win every domestic title until 2017, including a domestic quadruple in 2016 season. Žalgiris' winning streak finally came to an end on 24 September 2017 when they lost the Lithuanian Football Cup Final to Stumbras. After that defeat, the club's morale was broken; they failed to win any of the following league games, and were overtaken by Sūduva after a 0–3 defeat in Marijampolė. This was Žalgiris' first league defeat by three goals since the 2010 season.

Due to these defeats, Dambrauskas decided to resign on 23 October 2017.

=== RFS ===
Dambrauskas was appointed manager of Latvian Higher League side RFS on 6 December 2017.

=== Gorica ===
On 25 February 2020, Dambrauskas joined Croatian First Football League side HNK Gorica as their new manager. On 3 January 2021, Dambrauskas, together with the club's sporting director Mindaugas Nikoličius, left Gorica.

=== Ludogorets Razgrad ===
On the day of his departure from Gorica, Dambrauskas was appointed as the head coach of Bulgarian champions Ludogorets Razgrad. He subsequently lead the club to its first UEFA Champions League play-off round appearance in five years after defeating Olympiacos on penalties in the third qualifying round. In early October 2021, Dambrauskas parted ways with the team.

=== Omonia ===
On 29 February 2024, Dambrauskas was appointed head coach of Cypriot First Division club Omonia Nicosia starting from the 2024–25 season. He left the club by mutual consent on 29 November 2024, following a 0–3 UEFA Conference League defeat against Legia Warsaw.

=== Diósgyőr ===
On 26 February 2025, he was appointed manager of Diósgyőr. He debuted with a 2–1 league victory over Puskás Akadémia at Diósgyőri Stadion on 1 March 2025.

=== Sabah ===
On 20 June 2025, Dambrauskas was appointed head coach of Sabah in the Azerbaijan Premier League, signing a three-year contract. In 2026, Sabah were crowned the Azerbaijan Premier League champions and won the Azerbaijan Cup, completing the domestic double under Dambrauskas' management. On 25 August 2026, Sabah reached the UEFA Champions League league phase for the first time in the club's history after defeating Hapoel Be'er Sheva 6–4 on aggregate in the play-off round.

== Personal life ==
Dambrauskas is married to Ingrida, and they have two sons, Lukas and Midas.

Outside football, Dambrauskas has a strong interest in chess. He has said that he has played chess more than football and that the game helped him develop emotional control, particularly in dealing with victories and defeats. He played for a club in Panevėžys while managing Ekranas and participated in the Lithuanian rapid chess championship.

== Managerial statistics ==
As of match played 4 November 2026

Managerial record by team and tenure
Team	Nat.	From	To	Record					Ref.
Team	Nat.	From	To	P	W	D	L	Win %	Ref.
Ekranas	(Lithuania)	26 April 2013	19 September 2014	60	30	11	19	50.00	
Žalgiris	(Lithuania)	17 December 2014	23 October 2017	124	92	15	17	74.19	
RFS	(Latvia)	6 December 2017	24 February 2020	69	42	9	18	60.87	
Gorica	(Croatia)	25 February 2020	3 January 2021	30	16	8	6	53.33	
Ludogorets Razgrad	(Bulgaria)	3 January 2021	3 October 2021	40	26	6	8	65.00	
Hajduk Split	(Croatia)	2 November 2021	12 September 2022	38	23	8	7	60.53	
OFI	(Greece)	25 October 2022	9 December 2023	57	32	14	11	56.14	
Omonia	(Cyprus)	1 June 2024	29 September 2024	21	13	1	7	61.90	
Diósgyőr	(Hungary)	26 February 2025	30 June 2025	12	3	4	5	25.00	
Sabah	(Azerbaijan)	1 July 2025	Present	64	41	13	10	64.06	
Total				499	305	85	109	61.12	—

== Honours ==
=== Managerial ===
Žalgiris

- A Lyga: 2015, 2016
- Lithuanian Cup: 2014–15, 2015–16, 2016
- Lithuanian Supercup: 2015, 2016, 2017

RFS

- Latvian Cup: 2019

Ludogorets Razgrad

- Bulgarian First League: 2020–21

Hajduk Split

- Croatian Football Cup: 2021–22

Sabah

- Azerbaijan Premier League: 2025–26
- Azerbaijan Cup: 2025–26

Individual

- Active Westminster Awards Active Coach: 2010
- A Lyga Manager of the Round: 2016 3rd round, 2017 1st round
- Lithuanian Coach of the Year: 2016, 2020, 2021
