= Mamadou Mbodj =

Senegalese footballer

Personal information
- Full name: Pape Mamadou Mbodj
- Date of birth: 12 March 1993 (age 33)
- Place of birth: Dakar, Senegal
- Height: 1.88 m (6 ft 2 in)
- Position: Centre-back

Team information
- Current team: Irtysh Pavlodar
- Number: 26

Senior career*
Years	Team	Apps	(Gls)
2004–2014	Dakar Sacré-Cœur	71	(2)
2014–2015	Red Star Belgrade	8	(1)
2014	→ Napredak Kruševac (loan)	7	(0)
2016–2018	Žalgiris	90	(8)
2019–2022	Neftçi Baku	71	(7)
2023	Ordabasy	23	(1)
2024–2025	Hapoel Hadera	40	(1)
2025–2026	Dong A Thanh Hoa	9	(3)
2026–	Irtysh Pavlodar	15	(2)

International career
2012–2013	Senegal U20		
2013	Senegal U23		
- * Club domestic league appearances and goals as of 1 November 2026

Pape Mamadou Mbodj (born 12 March 1993) is a Senegalese professional footballer who plays as a centre-back for Kazakhstan Premier League club Irtysh Pavlodar.

== Club career ==
Pape Mamadou Mbodj was born in Dakar, Senegal. He was playing with football club Dakar Sacré-Cœur until the 2014. While playing for Dakar Sacré-Cœur, he was selected to be part of the Senegalese U-20 squad at the 2013 Jeux de la Francophonie.

For the 2014–15 season he joined Red Star Belgrade, but because of many players on his position on the field, he was loaned to Napredak Kruševac. He made his Jelen SuperLiga debut for Napredak Kruševac on 4 October 2014 in away match against Spartak Subotica - the game ended with a draw result 0–0. He was substituted in for Predrag Lazić in the injury time of that match.

From 2016 season was member of Žalgiris Vilnius. After 2018 season he left the Lithuanian club.

On 8 December 2018, Mbodj signed for Neftçi PFK on a 2.5-year contract. On 7 June 2021, Mbodj extended his contract with Neftçi until 31 May 2023. On 19 December 2022, Mbodj left Neftçi by mutual consent having scored 9 goals in 94 games for the club.

On 24 February 2023, Kazakhstan Premier League club Ordabasy announced the signing of Mbodj.

== International career ==
Mbodj played in the Senegal U-20 team at the 2013 African U-20 Championship qualification. In April 2013 he was part of the first selection of Aliou Cisse since becoming the new coach of the Senegalese U-23 team.

== Honours ==
Žalgiris

- A Lyga: 2016
- Lithuanian Cup: 2015–16, 2016
- Lithuanian Supercup: 2016, 2017
