= Armantas Vitkauskas =

Lithuanian footballer

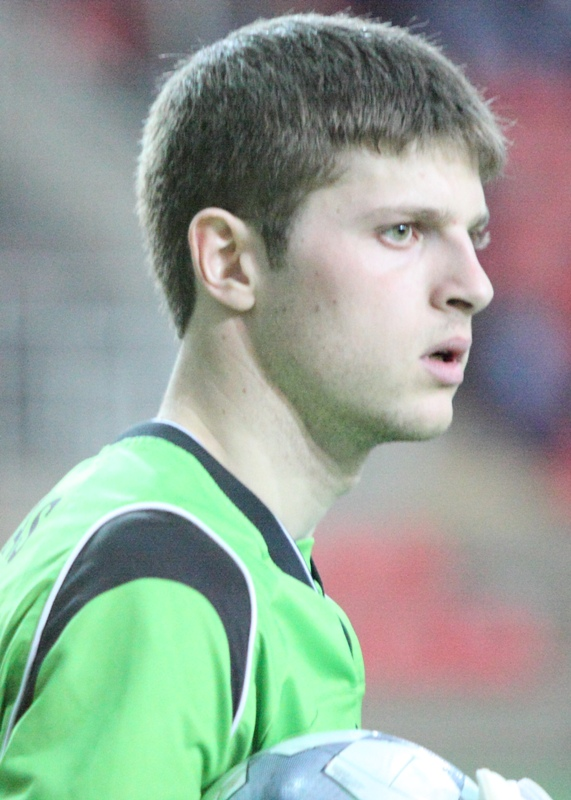

Personal information
- Date of birth: 23 March 1989 (age 37)
- Place of birth: Marijampolė, Lithuania
- Height: 1.93 m (6 ft 4 in)
- Position: Goalkeeper

Team information
- Current team: FK Banga

Senior career*
| Years | Team | Apps | (Gls) |
| 2007–2012 | Sūduva | 30 | (0) |
| 2012–2017 | Žalgiris Vilnius | 143 | (0) |
| 2018 | Concordia Chiajna | 2 | (0) |
| 2018–2019 | Žalgiris Vilnius | 25 | (0) |
| 2020 | Kauno Žalgiris | 2 | (0) |
| 2021–2024 | Riteriai | 120 | (0) |
| 2025– | Banga | 1 | (0) |

International career
| 2007–2008 | Lithuania U19 | 1 | (0) |
| 2009–2010 | Lithuania U21 | 1 | (0) |
| 2008 | Lithuania | 1 | (0) |
- * Club domestic league appearances and goals as of 27 October 2025

Armantas Vitkauskas (born 23 March 1989) is a Lithuanian professional footballer who plays as a goalkeeper.

Vitkauskas made his debut for Lithuania in a friendly match against Estonia. The match ended in a 1–1 draw.

== Career ==
He started his career in 2007. He played for FK Sūduva back then. Later, he became goalkeeper of Žalgiris Vilnius. In 2018, he played for Concordia Chiajna.

Since 2018 he was a player of Žalgiris Vilnius. After 2019 season he left FK Žalgiris.

On 24 December 2020, FK Kauno Žalgiris signed Vitkauskas.

== Honours ==
=== Club ===
Sūduva

- Lithuanian Cup (1): 2009
- Lithuanian Supercup (1): 2009

Žalgiris Vilnius

- Lithuanian Championship (4): 2013, 2014, 2015, 2016
- Lithuanian Cup (7): 2011–12, 2012–13, 2013–14, 2014–15, 2015–16, 2016, 2018
- Lithuanian Super Cup (5): 2013, 2014, 2015, 2016, 2017

=== Individual ===
- 2009 LFF Supercup MVP
