= Vytautas Lukša =

Lithuanian footballer

Personal information
- Date of birth: 14 August 1984 (age 42)
- Place of birth: Alytus, Lithuanian SSR, Soviet Union
- Height: 1.77 m (5 ft 10 in)
- Position: Midfielder

Senior career*
Years	Team	Apps	(Gls)
2001–2002	Dainava Alytus		
2003–2007	Vilnius	119	(16)
2008	FBK Kaunas	21	(2)
2009	MTZ-RIPO Minsk	23	(3)
2010	Illichivets Mariupol	5	(0)
2010	Arsenal Kyiv	1	(0)
2011	Tauras Tauragė	7	(2)
2012	Ekranas	32	(7)
2013	Polonia Warsaw	3	(0)
2013	Gomel	6	(0)
2014	Trakai	31	(7)
2015–2017	Žalgiris	61	(8)
2018	Jonava	18	(0)
2018	Trakai	9	(0)
2019	Atlantas Klaipėda	23	(3)
2021	Dainava Alytus	33	(1)

International career
2008–2017	Lithuania	27	(0)
- * Club domestic league appearances and goals

Vytautas Lukša (born 14 August 1984) is a Lithuanian former professional footballer who played as a midfielder.

== Honours ==
FBK Kaunas

- Lithuanian Cup: 2007–08

Ekranas

- A Lyga: 2013

Žalgiris

- A Lyga: 2015, 2016
- Lithuanian Cup: 2014–15, 2015–16, 2016
- Lithuanian Supercup: 2016, 2017
