= Slavko Blagojević =

Croatian footballer (born 1987)

Personal information
- Date of birth: 21 March 1987 (age 39)
- Place of birth: Otok, SFR Yugoslavia
- Height: 1.80 m (5 ft 11 in)
- Position: Midfielder

Youth career
- 2000–2006: Cibalia

Senior career*
Years	Team	Apps	(Gls)
2005–2007	Cibalia	7	(0)
2008	→ Graničar Županja (loan)		
2008–2010	Graničar Županja	24	(0)
2010–2012	Lučko	48	(1)
2012–2015	Istra 1961	75	(10)
2015–2016	RNK Split	39	(4)
2016–2018	Žalgiris Vilnius	66	(1)
2019–2020	RFS	27	(0)
2020–2025	Istra 1961	116	(0)

International career
2002	Croatia U15	1	(0)
2002	Croatia U16	0	(0)
2003	Croatia U17	1	(0)
- * Club domestic league appearances and goals as of 1 June 2025

Slavko Blagojević (born 21 March 1987) is a retired Croatian professional footballer who played as a midfielder.He is a set-piece specialist.

== Club career ==
=== NK Istra 1961 ===
In 2012, Blagojević joined NK Istra 1961 on a free transfer. He made his debut coming off the bench for the last 32 minutes of the match, in a 0–0 draw against Hajduk Split. He quickly became an integral part of the squad, making a total of 29 appearances in his first season with the club, starting 25 times and gathering a total of 9 yellow cards.

In the 2013–14 season, Blagojević continued to be an integral part of the squad, starting in all 30 of his appearances. It was his most productive season as a player, scoring 8 times, despite playing as a defensive midfielder. His notoriety for gathering cards continued, as he gathered 13 yellow cards.

=== RNK Split ===
In 2014–15 Blagojević was appointed the club captain. He made 16 appearances for NK Istra 1961, scoring a goal in a 1–1 draw against RNK Split. He further netted two assists: one in a 2–1 loss to NK Zagreb and one in a 1–1 draw against Slaven Belupo. After the 19th matchday, in January 2015, he made a €230 000 transfer to RNK Split.

He made his debut for RNK Split immediately after his transfer, in the 20th matchday, in a 2–2 draw against NK Istra. He scored his first goal for his new club against NK Osijek, in a 3–2 victory. He ended up making a total of 11 games for RNK Split in the 2014/15 season.

=== Žalgiris ===
In the 2015–16 season, Blagojević made 28 appearances for RNK Split, starting in each game. He scored three goals: one in a 2–1 win against NK Lokomotiva, one in a 2–1 win against NK Osijek and one against NK Istra. Next season, Blagojević made a free transfer to Žalgiris. He would play three seasons for his new club, making 77 appearances and scoring a single goal against Suduva.

=== NK Istra 1961 ===
Blagojević returned to NK Istra during the 2019–20 winter transfer period, on a free transfer. He made 13 appearances for Istra in the 2019–20 season, playing his last game against NK Osijek in the 34th matchday. He was appointed club captain for 7 of those games.

He was once again appointed club captain for the entire 2020–21 season.

== Honours ==
Žalgiris

- A Lyga: 2016
- Lithuanian Cup: 2016
- Lithuanian Supercup: 2017

RFS

- Latvian Cup: 2019
