= Linas Pilibaitis =

Lithuanian footballer

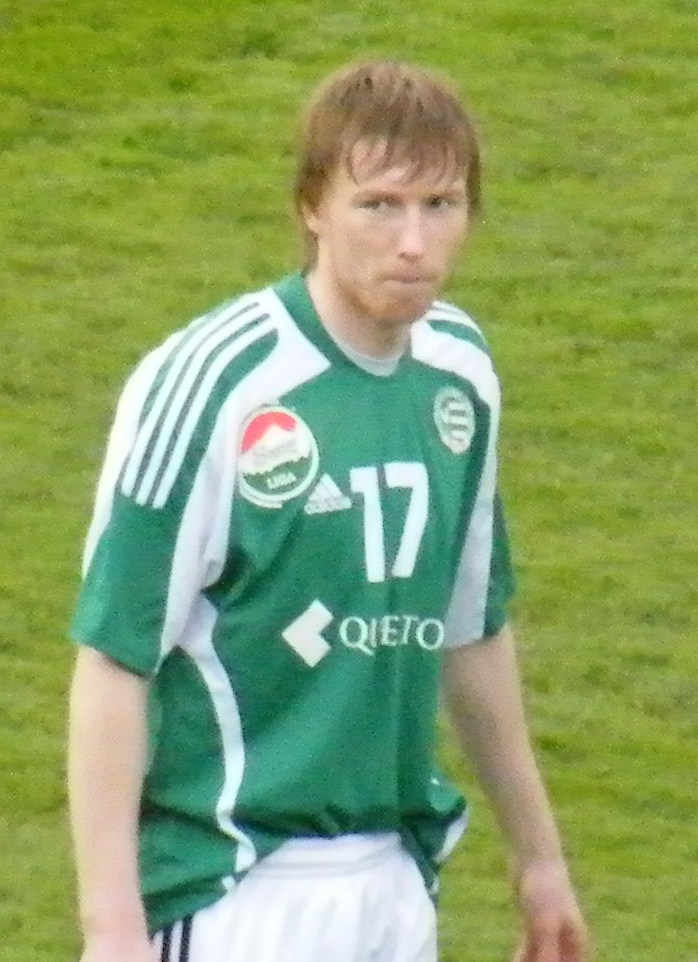

Personal information
- Date of birth: 5 April 1985 (age 41)
- Place of birth: Kretinga, Lithuanian SSR, Soviet Union
- Height: 1.81 m (5 ft 11 in)
- Position: Attacking midfielder

Senior career*
Years	Team	Apps	(Gls)
2002–2008	Kaunas	77	(11)
2004	→ Atlantas (loan)	8	(2)
2007	→ Hearts (loan)	6	(0)
2009–2014	Győr	92	(7)
2013–2014	→ Mezőkövesd (loan)	11	(1)
2014–2016	FK Žalgiris	91	(42)
2017	FK Atlantas	15	(3)
2017	Sepsi OSK	4	(0)
2018–2022	FK Kauno Žalgiris	147	(34)
2023–2025	FK TransINVEST	50	(12)

International career^{‡}
2006–2015	Lithuania	31	(0)
- * Club domestic league appearances and goals as of 24 November 2026 ‡ National team caps and goals as of 2015

Linas Pilibaitis (born 5 April 1985) is a Lithuanian former professional footballer.

== Club career ==
Pilibaitis was born in Kretinga. He joined Kaunas aged 17 in 2002, gradually working his way into the first team as he developed in the following years. This process was aided by a loan spell at Klaipėda side FK Atlantas in 2004, where he scored his first senior goal. Having played a prominent role in Kaunas's 2006 A Lyga victory, he was loaned to Hearts in January 2007. He made his debut for the Jambos in a 2–0 victory at Motherwell on 5 March 2007 but returned to Kaunas in August of that year, having made only five appearances for the Hearts first team.

Pilibaitis scored the winning goal for Kaunas which knocked out Rangers of the second qualifying tie of the UEFA Champions League on 6 August 2008. He joined than in January 2009 to Győri ETO FC.

In July 2012 he started a trial with Israeli club Maccabi Haifa.

On 26 February 2017, it was announced that Pilibaitis would return to A Lyga contenders Atlantas.

== International career ==
Usually played as an attacking midfielder or support striker, Pilibaitis earned his first international cap for Lithuania in 2006.

== Career statistics ==
Appearances and goals by club, season and competition
Club	Season	League			Cup		Continental		Total	
Club	Season	Division	Apps	Goals	Apps	Goals	Apps	Goals	Apps	Goals
Kaunas	2002	A Lyga	3	0	0	0	0	0	3	0
Kaunas	2003	A Lyga	0	0	0	0	0	0	0	0
Kaunas	2004	A Lyga	4	0	0	0	0	0	4	0
Kaunas	2005	A Lyga	15	4	0	0	0	0	15	4
Kaunas	2006	A Lyga	31	3	0	0	0	0	31	3
Kaunas	2008	A Lyga	24	4	0	0	0	0	24	4
Kaunas	Total		77	11	0	0	0	0	77	11
Atlantas (loan)	2004	A Lyga	8	2	0	0	0	0	8	2
Heart of Midlothian (loan)	2006–07	Scottish Premiership	6	0	0	0	0	0	6	0
Győr	2008–09	National Championship	6	0	4	0	6	5	16	5
Győr	2009–10	National Championship	27	1	5	1	0	0	32	2
Győr	2010–11	National Championship	25	3	3	1	8	1	36	5
Győr	2011–12	National Championship	27	2	5	0	0	0	32	2
Győr	2012–13	National Championship	14	1	3	0	0	0	17	1
Győr	Total		99	7	20	2	14	6	133	15
Mezőkövesd	2013–14	National Championship	11	1	7	0	0	0	18	1
FK Žalgiris	2013–14	A Lyga	33	17	6	4	2	0	41	21
FK Žalgiris	2014–15	A Lyga	29	16	4	2	2	0	35	18
FK Žalgiris	2015–16	A Lyga	25	8	5	4	1	0	31	12
FK Žalgiris	Total		87	41	15	10	5	0	107	51
Career total			288	62	42	12	19	6	349	80

== Honours ==
Kaunas

- A Lyga: 2002, 2004, 2006
- Lithuanian Cup: 2002, 2004, 2005

Győr

- Nemzeti Bajnokság I: 2012–13

FK Žalgiris

- A Lyga: 2014, 2015, 2016
- Lithuanian Cup: 2013–14, 2014–15, 2015–16, 2016
- Lithuanian Supercup: 2016

TransINVEST

- Lithuanian Cup: 2023
