= Predrag Pavlović =

Serbian footballer

Personal information
- Date of birth: 19 June 1986 (age 40)
- Place of birth: Kruševac, SR Serbia, SFR Yugoslavia
- Height: 1.77 m (5 ft 10 in)
- Positions: Winger; attacking midfielder

Youth career
- Napredak Kruševac
- 2002–2004: Partizan

Senior career*
Years	Team	Apps	(Gls)
2004–2006	Partizan	0	(0)
2004–2005	→ Napredak Kruševac (loan)	23	(5)
2005	→ Teleoptik (loan)	19	(1)
2006	→ Napredak Kruševac (loan)	18	(3)
2006–2010	Napredak Kruševac	108	(19)
2010	Debrecen	0	(0)
2010	Debrecen II	6	(0)
2011	Metalac Gornji Milanovac	13	(2)
2011–2013	OFK Beograd	31	(4)
2014–2015	Novi Pazar	65	(12)
2016	Sūduva	28	(8)
2017–2020	Mladost Lučani	96	(18)
2020–2023	Trayal Kruševac	66	(9)
Total		473	(81)

International career
2002–2003	Serbia and Montenegro U17 (Note: Official UEFA matches only)	6	(4)
2005	Serbia and Montenegro U19	4	(0)
2006–2008	Serbia U21	11	(1)
2008	Serbia U23	2	(0)
Medal record
Silver medal – second place	UEFA Under-21 Championship	2007
- * Club domestic league appearances and goals

Predrag Pavlović (Serbian Cyrillic: Предраг Павловић; born 19 June 1986) is a Serbian former professional footballer who played as a midfielder.

== Club career ==
Born in Kruševac, Pavlović made his first football steps at his hometown club Napredak. He would join the youth system of Partizan in 2002, becoming a member of their promising generation, consisting of Nebojša Marinković, Milan Smiljanić and Borko Veselinović, among others. In order to get senior team experience, Pavlović was sent on loan to his parent club Napredak in the 2004–05 season. He returned to Partizan in the summer of 2005, being assigned to their satellite club Teleoptik, before eventually going back on loan to Napredak in January 2006.

In the summer of 2006, Pavlović signed a permanent contract with Napredak, before the club got promoted to the Serbian SuperLiga in 2007. He had a breakthrough season in 2007–08, scoring eight goals in 30 league appearances. After failing to complete his move to Dutch side NEC Nijmegen in August 2008, Pavlović spent two more seasons at Napredak, but struggled to recover his old form.

In the summer of 2010, Pavlović moved abroad to Hungary and signed with Debrecen. He made two cup appearances for the first team, but also played for their reserve team in the Nemzeti Bajnokság II, before being released near the end of the year. In January 2011, Pavlović returned to his homeland, having a six-month stint with Metalac Gornji Milanovac.

On 12 July 2011, Pavlović signed a four-year contract with OFK Beograd. He retired from professional football in October 2013, at the age of 27, due to a long history of injury problems. However, Pavlović came out of retirement in February of the following year by signing with Novi Pazar.

In January 2016, Pavlović moved abroad for the second time and joined Lithuanian side Sūduva. He played one season for the club, helping them reach the national cup final. In January 2017, Pavlović returned to his homeland and joined Mladost Lučani. He would make 108 appearances and score 20 goals across all competitions over the next three and a half seasons.

== International career ==
Pavlović represented Serbia and Montenegro at the 2005 UEFA Under-19 Championship in Northern Ireland. He played the full 90 minutes in all of his team's four games, as they were eliminated by England in the semi-final. Already capped for the Serbia national under-21 team, Pavlović made one appearance at the 2007 UEFA Under-21 Championship, which was hosted in the Netherlands, losing to the hosts in the final.

Pavlović was also selected to represent Serbia at the 2008 Summer Olympics in Beijing, but failed to make an appearance in the tournament. He previously played in two friendlies against China U23.

== Career statistics ==
Appearances and goals by club, season and competition
Club	Season	League			Cup		Continental		Total	
Club	Season	Division	Apps	Goals	Apps	Goals	Apps	Goals	Apps	Goals
Napredak Kruševac	2006–07	Serbian First League	31	5	2	0	—		33	5
Napredak Kruševac	2007–08	Serbian SuperLiga	30	8	2	1	—		32	9
Napredak Kruševac	2008–09	Serbian SuperLiga	32	4	3	1	—		35	5
Napredak Kruševac	2009–10	Serbian SuperLiga	15	2	0	0	—		15	2
Napredak Kruševac	Total		108	19	7	2	—		115	21
Debrecen	2010–11	Nemzeti Bajnokság I	0	0	2	0	0	0	2	0
Debrecen II	2010–11	Nemzeti Bajnokság II	6	0	2	0	—		8	0
Metalac Gornji Milanovac	2010–11	Serbian SuperLiga	13	2	0	0	—		13	2
OFK Beograd	2011–12	Serbian SuperLiga	8	2	2	0	—		10	2
OFK Beograd	2012–13	Serbian SuperLiga	21	2	4	0	—		25	2
OFK Beograd	2013–14	Serbian SuperLiga	2	0	1	0	—		3	0
OFK Beograd	Total		31	4	7	0	—		38	4
Novi Pazar	2013–14	Serbian SuperLiga	14	1	0	0	—		14	1
Novi Pazar	2014–15	Serbian SuperLiga	29	4	0	0	—		29	4
Novi Pazar	2015–16	Serbian SuperLiga	22	7	1	0	—		23	7
Novi Pazar	Total		65	12	1	0	—		66	12
Sūduva	2016	A Lyga	28	8	6	1	2	0	36	9
Mladost Lučani	2016–17	Serbian SuperLiga	10	0	1	0	—		11	0
Mladost Lučani	2017–18	Serbian SuperLiga	30	9	5	0	0	0	35	9
Mladost Lučani	2018–19	Serbian SuperLiga	35	4	5	2	—		40	6
Mladost Lučani	2019–20	Serbian SuperLiga	21	5	1	0	—		22	5
Mladost Lučani	Total		96	18	12	2	—		108	20
Trayal Kruševac	2020–21	Serbian First League	32	8	1	0	—		33	8
Trayal Kruševac	2021–22	Serbian League East			1	0	—		1	0
Trayal Kruševac	2022–23	Serbian First League	34	1	—		—		34	1
Trayal Kruševac	Total		66	9	2	0	—		68	9
Career total			413	72	39	5	2	0	454	77

== Honours ==
Sūduva

- Lithuanian Cup runner-up: 2016

Mladost Lučani

- Serbian Cup runner-up: 2017–18

Serbia U21

- UEFA Under-21 Championship runner-up: 2007
