= Simonas Stankevičius =

Lithuanian footballer

Personal information
- Date of birth: 3 October 1995 (age 31)
- Place of birth: Panevėžys, Lithuania
- Height: 6 ft 2 in (1.88 m)
- Position: Striker

Youth career
- 2009–2011: National Football Academy
- 2011–2014: Leicester City

Senior career*
Years	Team	Apps	(Gls)
2014–2016	Leicester City	0	(0)
2014	→ Nuneaton Town (loan)	5	(0)
2015	→ Oldham Athletic (loan)	4	(0)
2016	Žalgiris B	8	(4)
2016	Žalgiris	8	(1)
2016	→ Šibenik (loan)	12	(0)
2017	Mjøndalen	6	(0)
2017	→ Egersund (loan)	7	(0)
Total		51	(5)

International career
2013–2015	Lithuania	10	(0)
- * Club domestic league appearances and goals

Simonas Stankevičius (born 3 October 1995) is a Lithuanian retired international footballer who played as a striker.

== Early and personal life ==
Stankevičius was raised in Panevėžys. His mother was a semi-professional tennis player and his grandfather was also a professional footballer.

== Club career ==
Stankevičius started his youth career in his hometown of Panevėžys before moving to the National Football Academy in Kaunas at the age of 14. He was scouted by English club Leicester City after playing under-16 youth international football for Lithuania.

He joined Nuneaton Town on a two-month loan on 21 November 2014.

On 28 August 2015, Stankevičius joined Oldham Athletic on a three-month loan deal.

On 12 January 2016, Stankevičius signed for Žalgiris. He moved on loan to Croatian club Šibenik in August 2016.

He was bought by Norwegian First Division club Mjøndalen on 18 February 2017. He finished his career later that season with Egersund.

== International career ==
He made his international debut for Lithuania in 2013.

== Retirement ==
Stankevičius announced his retirement from football in 2017 at the age of 22, citing his lack of love for playing football as the reason for his surprising retirement. He has since worked in programming and intended to gain a science degree.

== Career statistics ==
=== Club statistics ===
As of 17 January 2018

Club	Season	League		FA Cup		League Cup		Other		Total	
Club	Season	Apps	Goals	Apps	Goals	Apps	Goals	Apps	Goals	Apps	Goals
Leicester City	2014–15	0	0	0	0	0	0	0	0	0	0
Leicester City	2015–16	0	0	0	0	0	0	0	0	0	0
Leicester City	Total	0	0	0	0	0	0	0	0	0	0
Nuneaton Town (loan)	2014–15	5	0	0	0	0	0	1	0	6	0
Oldham Athletic (loan)	2015–16	4	0	0	0	0	0	0	0	4	0
Žalgiris	2016	8	1	4	0	0	0	0	0	12	1
Šibenik (loan)	2016–17	12	0	1	0	0	0	0	0	13	0
Mjøndalen	2017	6	0	2	0	0	0	0	0	10	0
Career total		36	1	7	0	0	0	1	0	46	1

=== International statistics ===
As of 16 January 2018

Lithuania
Year	Apps	Goals
2013	1	0
2014	7	0
2015	2	0
2016	0	0
Total	10	0
