= FK Rotalis Vilnius =

Lithuanian football club

Vilniaus „Rotalis“
- Full name: VšĮ „Sporto ir futbolo klubas ROTALIS“
- Founded: 2005
- Ground: „Panerio“ stadium, Vilnius
- Capacity: 2000
- Chairman: Karolis Adomėnas
- Manager: Viktoras Osetrovas
- League: LFF II lyga
- 2015: 2nd (Rytų zona)
Home colours	Away colours

SFK Rotalis, is a Lithuanian football club from the city of Vilnius.

== History ==
The team was founded in 2005. After playing in the local Vilnius league, the team started playing in the LFF II lyga from the year 2012.

=== Current squad ===
As of March 2016 Note: Flags indicate national team as defined under FIFA eligibility rules; some limited exceptions apply. Players may hold more than one non-FIFA nationality.

No.	Pos.	Nation	Player
1	GK	LTU	Artur Semež
18	GK	LTU	Sergej Babincev
2	MF	LTU	Linas Krasauskas
3	MF	LTU	Žygimantas Okulevičius
4	DF	LTU	Tautvydas Svidras
20	DF	LTU	Darius Kareiva
5	DF	LTU	Kornelijus Kairys
10	MF	LTU	Egidijus Osetrovas
19	MF	LTU	Valdas Saulėnas
8	DF	TUR	Ferhat Sercan Saylik
9	DF	LTU	Arnoldas Gerasimovas

No.	Pos.	Nation	Player
21	MF	LTU	Aleksej Grigorjev
11	DF	LTU	Albert Bogdan
12	FW	LTU	Artūras Borščevskis
13	MF	LTU	Vydmantas Kuzmickas
7	MF	LTU	Saulius Vaiginas
14	FW	LTU	Justinas Ruginis
15	MF	LTU	Arnold Želtuchin
16	MF	LTU	Artūras Mockus
17	FW	LTU	Vasilij Novičkov
22	FW	LTU	Daumantas Žukauskas

== Competition history ==
Lithuania

Season	Div.	Pos.	Pl.	W	D	L	Goals	Pts	Cup
2008	4th	6							
2009	4th	5							
2010	4th	5							
2011	4th	5							
2012	3rd	8	22	9	3	10	31-32	30	1/64 f.
2013	3rd	4	24	11	7	6	38-31	40	1/64 f.
2014	3rd	9	26	9	5	12	31-43	32	
2015	3rd	2	24	12	8	4	47-27	44	1/64 f.
