= Arūnas Klimavičius =

Lithuanian footballer

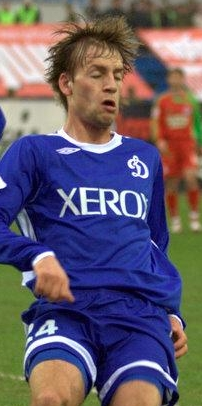

Personal information
- Full name: Arūnas Klimavičius
- Date of birth: 5 October 1982 (age 44)
- Place of birth: Panevėžys, Lithuanian SSR, Soviet Union
- Height: 1.88 m (6 ft 2 in)
- Position: Defender

Senior career*
Years	Team	Apps	(Gls)
2000–2007	Ekranas	168	(18)
2007–2008	Dynamo Moscow	23	(2)
2009	Ural	25	(6)
2010	Sibir Novosibirsk	11	(1)
2011	Zhetysu	27	(6)
2012	Aktobe	16	(1)
2013–2014	Zhetysu	53	(1)
2014–2015	Tobol	22	(0)
2016–2017	Trakai	57	(7)
2018	Jonava	6	(2)
2018–2019	Kauno Žalgiris	32	(1)

International career
2005–2017	Lithuania	43	(3)
- * Club domestic league appearances and goals

Arūnas Klimavičius (born 5 October 1982 in Panevėžys) is a Lithuanian former professional footballer and chairman of the Lithuanian Professional Footballers' Association.

== Career ==
On 17 February, it was revealed on the Hearts website that he was having a trial with the Scottish Premier League side. On 8 December 2009 the 27-year-old Lithuanian defender has signed a two-year deal with Sibir. In 2011, he signed for Kazakhstani side FC Zhetysu.

In December 2014, Klimavičius moved to FC Tobol.

== International career ==
Klimavičius played 8 games at UEFA Euro 2008 qualifying.

=== International goals ===
Scores and results list Lithuania's goal tally first.

Goal	Date	Venue	Opponent	Score	Result	Competition
1.	26 March 2008	LFF Stadium, Vilnius, Lithuania	Azerbaijan	1–0	1–0	Friendly
2.	7 February 2009	Complexo Desportivo Municipal de Vila Real Santo António, Vila Real de Santo António, Portugal	Poland	1–1	1–1	Friendly
3.	10 August 2011	Darius and Girėnas Stadium, Kaunas, Lithuania	Armenia	1–0	3–0	Friendly

== Post-playing career ==
After the 2019 season finished, Arūnas retired from professional football. In January 2020, Klimavičius had been hired as a tennis coach. On 28 January 2020, he also founded and became the president of the Association of Professional Footballers (PFA - Profesionalių futbolininkų asociacija). The association was established to unionize Lithuanian professional footballers, properly represent their interests and provide them with qualified assistance.

Klimavičius covered the UEFA Euro 2020 as a studio analyst on LNK. In November 2021, he became the host of the podcast about Lithuanian football "PadkaStas".

== Personal life ==
He is the son of Albertas Klimavičius and the brother of Linas Klimavičius.

== Honours ==
Ekranas

- A Lyga: 2005
- Lithuanian Supercup: 2006

Lithuania

- Baltic Cup: 2005, 2010
