= Justas Lasickas =

Lithuanian footballer (born 1997)

Personal information
- Date of birth: 6 October 1997 (age 29)
- Place of birth: Vilnius, Lithuania
- Height: 1.75 m (5 ft 9 in)
- Positions: Right-back; winger

Team information
- Current team: Rijeka
- Number: 23

Youth career
- 2004–2013: Žalgiris Vilnius

Senior career*
Years	Team	Apps	(Gls)
2013–2017	Žalgiris Vilnius B		
2014–2018	Žalgiris Vilnius	25	(1)
2017–2018	→ Zemun (loan)	34	(3)
2018–2019	Jagiellonia Białystok	1	(0)
2019–2022	Voždovac	89	(6)
2022–2025	Olimpija Ljubljana	77	(2)
2025–	Rijeka	35	(1)

International career^{‡}
2014–2015	Lithuania U19	7	(0)
2016–2018	Lithuania U21	14	(1)
2018–	Lithuania	77	(3)
- * Club domestic league appearances and goals as of 25 September 2026 (UTC) ‡ National team caps and goals as of 18 November 2026

Justas Lasickas (born 6 October 1997) is a Lithuanian professional footballer who plays as a right-back or winger for Croatian Football League club Rijeka and the Lithuania national team.

== Club career ==
Lasickas debuted with Žalgiris Vilnius in 2014. He had also played for the team's reserves in the Lithuanian second division.

In summer 2017, he was loaned out to newly promoted Serbian SuperLiga side Zemun. He debuted in the 2017–18 Serbian SuperLiga on 5 August 2017, in a game against Radnički Niš. Lasickas scored his first SuperLiga goal in the seventh round, in a home game against Bačka on 26 August 2017.

After playing with Jagiellonia Białystok in Poland for one season, he returned to Serbia in June 2019 and signed with Voždovac.

In May 2022, Lasickas joined Slovenian PrvaLiga side Olimpija Ljubljana. He made his league debut for Olimpija on 24 July 2022 against Tabor Sežana in a 1–0 away win.

== International career ==
Lasickas represented Lithuania at under-19 and under-21 levels.

In March 2018, he received a call from the senior team for their friendly matches against Georgia and Armenia. He debuted for Lithuania on 24 March in the match against Georgia.

== Career statistics ==
=== International ===
As of match played 16 November 2026

Appearances and goals by national team and year
National team	Year	Apps	Goals
Lithuania
Lithuania	2018	7	0
Lithuania	2019	4	0
Lithuania	2020	7	0
Lithuania	2021	12	2
Lithuania	2022	8	0
Lithuania	2023	9	0
Lithuania	2024	10	0
Lithuania	2025	10	0
Lithuania	2026	10	1
Total		77	3

Scores and results list Lithuania's goal tally first, score column indicates score after each Lasickas goal.

List of international goals scored by Justas Lasickas
No.	Date	Venue	Opponent	Score	Result	Competition
1	9 October 2021	LFF Stadium, Vilnius, Lithuania	Bulgaria	1–0	3–1	2022 FIFA World Cup qualification
2	15 November 2021	LFF Stadium, Vilnius, Lithuania	Kuwait	1–1	1–1	Friendly
3	26 March 2026	Stadionul Zimbru, Chișinău, Moldova	Moldova	1–0	2–0	Friendly

== Honours ==
Žalgiris Vilnius

- A Lyga: 2014, 2015, 2016
- Lithuanian Cup: 2014–15, 2015–16, 2016
- Lithuanian Supercup: 2016

Olimpija Ljubljana

- Slovenian PrvaLiga: 2022–23, 2024–25
- Slovenian Cup: 2022–23
