= Élton (footballer, born 1989) =

Brazilian footballer

Personal information
- Full name: Élton Constantino da Silva
- Date of birth: 20 July 1989 (age 37)
- Place of birth: Juazeiro, Brazil
- Height: 1.80 m (5 ft 11 in)
- Position: Defender

Team information
- Current team: CSM Târgu Jiu
- Number: 21

Youth career
- –2008: Botafogo-SP

Senior career*
Years	Team	Apps	(Gls)
2008–2009	Botafogo-SP		
2010	Audax	14	(0)
2011–2012	Taubaté	18	(1)
2013	Ferroviária	11	(0)
2013–2015	Pandurii Târgu Jiu	40	(2)
2015	Voluntari	0	(0)
2016	Žalgiris	8	(1)
2017–2020	Ferroviária	23	(1)
2019	→ São Bento (loan)	10	(1)
2020	Mirassol	7	(1)
2021	São Caetano	0	(0)
2021	América (RN)	10	(0)
2021–2022	Hercílio	6	(0)
2023	Corvinul Hunedoara	7	(0)
2024–2026	CSM Reșița	58	(6)
2026–	CSM Târgu Jiu	0	(0)
- * Club domestic league appearances and goals as of 9 May 2026

Élton Constantino da Silva (born 20 July 1989), simply known as Élton is a Brazilian professional footballer who plays as defender for Liga III club CSM Târgu Jiu.

== Club career ==
Élton started his career with Botafogo-SP in 2008. Two years later, he joined Audax. After 14 appearances for the club, he switched to Taubaté in 2011 and played there until 2012. In 2013, he switched clubs, being transferred to Pandurii Târgu-Jiu in Romania, where his twin brother Erico was playing. The following year, he was close to a move to CFR Cluj but eventually remained at Pandurii. In 2016, he joined Lithuanian side Žalgiris Vilnius.

== Honours ==
Pandurii Târgu Jiu

- Cupa Ligii runner-up: 2014–15

Žalgiris

- Lithuanian Cup: 2015–16
- Lithuanian Super Cup: 2016

Ferroviária

- Copa Paulista: 2017

Mirassol

- Campeonato Brasileiro Série D: 2020

Corvinul Hunedoara

- Liga III: 2022–23
