= Saulius Klevinskas =

Lithuanian footballer

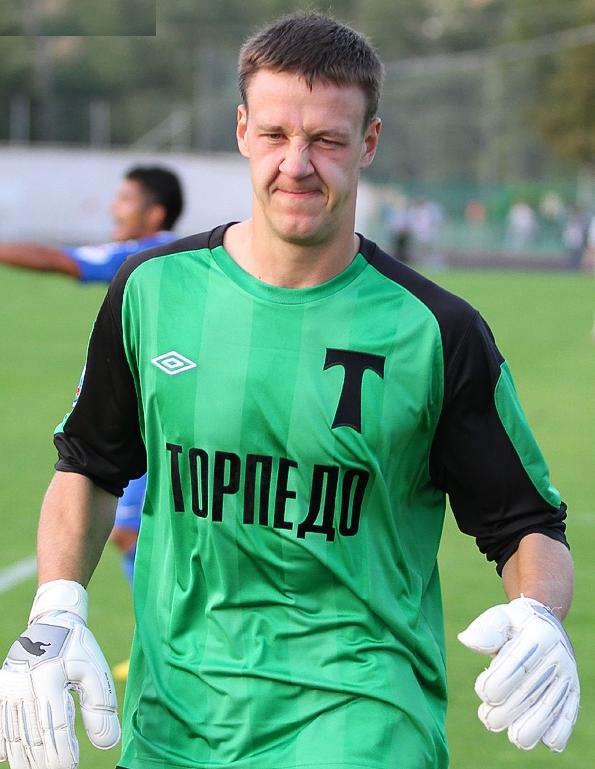
- With Torpedo Moscow in 2011

Personal information
- Date of birth: 2 April 1984 (age 42)
- Place of birth: Marijampolė, Lithuania
- Height: 1.92 m (6 ft 4 in)
- Position: Goalkeeper

Senior career*
Years	Team	Apps	(Gls)
2001–2009	FK Sūduva	106	(0)
2010	Mika Yerevan	11	(0)
2010–2011	Žalgiris	12	(0)
2011–2014	Torpedo Moscow	54	(0)
2015–2017	Žalgiris	36	(0)
2017	Vytis Vilnius	?	(?)
2018	FK Sūduva	0	(0)

International career
2006–2015	Lithuania	4	(0)
- * Club domestic league appearances and goals

Saulius Klevinskas (born 2 April 1984) is a retired Lithuanian professional footballer who played as a goalkeeper. He later became motocross and off-road motorcycle racer.

== Footballer career ==
Klevinskas returned for a second spell in Žalgiris in January 2015, but could not beat Armantas Vitkauskas for the main spot and took role of the second choice keeper. Goalkeeper left the club on 8 July 2017. He managed a total of 57 appearances in all competitions throughout 2.5 years in the club, winning two league titles, three domestic cup and supercup victories.

== Motorcycle racer career ==
Klevinskas took up motorcycle racing in 2021, participating in national as well as international motocross competitions.

In 2024, Klevinskas participated in the Abu Dhabi Desert Challenge and Rallye du Maroc world motocross competitions.

After intense preparation, Klevinskas participated in the 2026 Dakar Rally, finishing in 44th place.
