= Marin Matoš =

Croatian footballer

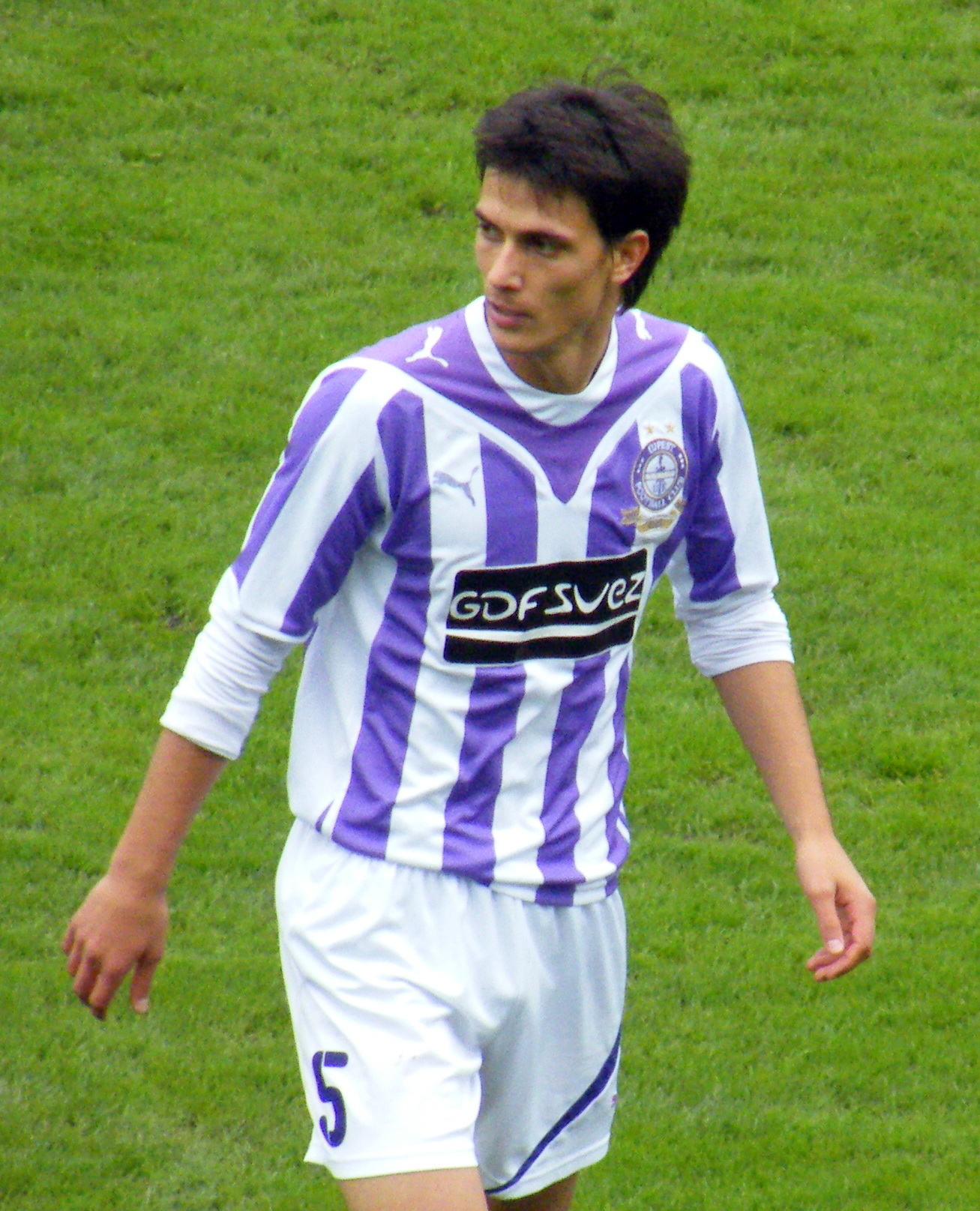

Personal information
- Date of birth: 26 January 1989 (age 37)
- Place of birth: Zagreb, SFR Yugoslavia
- Height: 1.85 m (6 ft 1 in)
- Position: Midfielder

Team information
- Current team: Kurilovec

Youth career
- –2005: Dinamo Zagreb
- 2006: Posavina
- 2006–2007: Croatia Sesvete
- 2007: AKA Red Bull Salzburg

Senior career*
Years	Team	Apps	(Gls)
2007–2010	Red Bull Salzburg Juniors	64	(11)
2010–2011	Újpest FC	11	(0)
2010–2011	-> Újpest FC II	6	(2)
2011–2013	Cibalia	35	(3)
2013–2014	Slaven Belupo	10	(1)
2014–2015	Istra 1961	34	(3)
2016	Žalgiris	22	(3)
2017	Gorica	13	(0)
2017–2018	Lučko	29	(0)
2018–2020	Kurilovec		
2021	Zagorec		
2021	Ravnice		
2022–	Kurilovec		
- * Club domestic league appearances and goals as of 21 July 2018

Marin Matoš (born 26 January 1989) is a Croatian football player who plays for Kurilovec.

== Club career ==
Matoš had his first spell abroad with the Red Bull Salzburg Juniors. On 19 January 2016 Matoš signed a contract with Lithuanian champions FK Žalgiris. He later played for NK Lučko in the Druga HNL.
