= Jorge Chula =

Portuguese footballer (born 1990)

Personal information
- Full name: Jorge Miguel Feijoca Chula
- Date of birth: 13 February 1990 (age 36)
- Place of birth: Benavente, Portugal
- Height: 1.74 m (5 ft 9 in)
- Position: Winger

Youth career
- 2001–2006: Benavente
- 2006–2007: Braga
- 2007–2009: Porto

Senior career*
| Years | Team | Apps | (Gls) |
| 2009–2011 | Porto | 0 | (0) |
| 2009–2010 | → Tourizense (loan) | 29 | (4) |
| 2010–2011 | → VVV (loan) | 24 | (1) |
| 2011–2012 | União Leiria | 0 | (0) |
| 2012 | → Covilhã (loan) | 11 | (0) |
| 2012–2013 | Sporting CP B | 11 | (1) |
| 2013 | → Moreirense (loan) | 5 | (0) |
| 2013–2014 | Marítimo B | 33 | (3) |
| 2014 | Marítimo | 2 | (0) |
| 2014–2015 | Aves | 7 | (1) |
| 2015–2017 | Žalgiris | 10 | (1) |
| 2018 | São Martinho | 16 | (0) |
| 2018–2019 | Merelinense | 16 | (0) |
| 2019 | Gandzasar | 15 | (1) |
| 2019–2020 | Pedras Salgadas | 21 | (0) |
| 2020–2023 | Jeunesse Canach | | |
| Total | | 200 | (12) |

International career
| 2007–2008 | Portugal U18 | 5 | (1) |
- * Club domestic league appearances and goals

Jorge Miguel Feijoca Chula (born 13 February 1990) is a Portuguese former professional footballer who played mainly as a right winger.

== Club career ==
Born in Benavente, Santarém District, Chula alternated between the second and third divisions in his first three and a half years as a senior. He made his Primeira Liga debut during the 2012–13 season with Moreirense F.C. after signing on loan from Sporting CP in January 2013, but totalled only 189 minutes of action and also saw his team be relegated; additionally, he served a one-year loan at VVV-Venlo from the Dutch Eredivisie.

Chula appeared in a further two matches in his country's top flight in the 2013–14 campaign, with C.S. Marítimo, on both occasions as a substitute as he featured mainly for the reserves in the second tier. He joined A Lyga winners FK Žalgiris on 17 June 2015 from C.D. Aves, leaving the club by mutual agreement on 25 February 2017.
