= Tautvydas Eliošius =

Lithuanian footballer

Personal information
- Date of birth: 3 November 1991 (age 35)
- Place of birth: Ukmergė, Lithuania
- Height: 1.72 m (5 ft 8 in)
- Position: Midfielder

Youth career
- 2005–2009: Šiauliai

Senior career*
Years	Team	Apps	(Gls)
2010–2013	Šiauliai	91	(1)
2009–2011	→ Šiauliai 2	18	(7)
2014–2015	Kruoja	51	(5)
2015–2016	Žalgiris	8	(0)
2016	→ Žalgiris B	3	(0)
2016	→ Lietava (loan)	12	(0)
2017–2018	Jonava	58	(0)
2019–2023	FK Panevėžys	145	(7)
2024–present	FK Širvėna Biržai	0	(0)

International career^{‡}
2009–2010	Lithuania-19	7	(0)
2011	Lithuania-21	1	(0)
2014–2021	Lithuania	11	(0)
- * Club domestic league appearances and goals as of 13 November 2023 ‡ National team caps and goals as of 9 June 2021

Tautvydas Eliošius (born 3 November 1991) is a Lithuanian professional footballer who plays as an attacking midfielder.

Eliošius made his international debut in November 2014 when he came as substitute in Euro 2016 qualification match against Switzerland.

== Career ==
Tautvydas started his career at FK Šiauliai where he trained together with his older brother Tadas Eliošius. In 2009 he finally broke into the first team and quickly became one of team leaders. Before 2014 season he joined other A Lyga side Kruoja. Midfielder led his team to silver medals, was elected into A Lyga Team of the Year, and awarded with A Lyga Goal of the Year.

After Kruoja collapsed in 2015, Eliošius joined Lithuanian champions Žalgiris, but he didn't become a first team player and was loaned out to Lietava on 15 July 2016. After the season Žalgiris terminated his contract by mutual agreement and Eliošius returned to Jonava as a free agent.

== International career ==
Tautvydas Eliošius' first call-up to the senior Lithuania squad came in 2014 for the UEFA Euro 2016 qualifying against Switzerland.
