= Linas Klimavičius =

Lithuanian footballer

Personal information
- Full name: Linas Klimavičius
- Date of birth: 10 April 1989 (age 37)
- Place of birth: Panevėžys, Lithuanian SSR
- Height: 1.91 m (6 ft 3 in)
- Position: Defender

Youth career
- Ekranas

Senior career*
Years	Team	Apps	(Gls)
2006–2007	Ekranas	15	(1)
2007	Sūduva	11	(0)
2007–2012	Dnipro Dnipropetrovsk	1	(0)
2010	→Kryvbas Kryvyi Rih (loan)	0	(0)
2013–2014	Daugava Rīga	25	(1)
2014–2015	Trakai	67	(6)
2016–2018	Žalgiris	70	(2)
2019–2020	Dinamo București	27	(2)
2020	Politehnica Iași	13	(0)
2020	Sūduva	4	(0)
2021	Dainava	26	(1)
2022–2025	Panevėžys	102	(7)
Total		361	(20)

International career^{‡}
2005–2006	Lithuania-17	3	(0)
2006–2008	Lithuania-19	7	(0)
2007–2010	Lithuania-21	17	(0)
2015–2024	Lithuania	44	(0)
- * Club domestic league appearances and goals as of 24 January 2026 ‡ National team caps and goals as of 12 June 2024

Linas Klimavičius (born 10 April 1989) is a Lithuanian former professional footballer who played as a defender.

== Career ==
Klimavičius started his career as a teenage prodigy with Ekranas and then was promoted to the main-squad team. During 2008–2012, he played in the Ukrainian football clubs. He made a single appearance in the Ukrainian Premier League in a match for FC Dnipro against Metalurh Donetsk on 19 October 2008.

=== Dinamo București ===
In January 2019, Klimavičius signed a contract with Liga I club Dinamo București. One year later, in January 2020, he was released after 28 games played for Dinamo (27 in Liga I and one game in Cupa României).

=== Politehnica Iasi ===
On 12 January 2020, Klimavičius signed a contract with Liga I club FC Politehnica Iași.

=== FK Sūduva ===
In 10 September he signed a contract with Lithuanian champions FK Sūduva.

== Honours ==
Žalgiris

- Lithuanian Championship: 2016
- Lithuanian Cup: 2015–16, 2016, 2018
- Lithuanian Super Cup: 2016, 2017

Panevėžys

- Lithuanian Championship: 2023
- Lithuanian Super Cup: 2024
- Lithuanian Cup: 2025
