= Bahrudin Atajić =

Bosnian-Swedish footballer

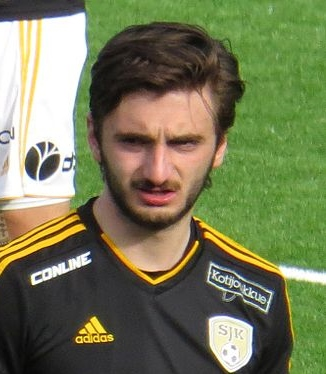
- Atajić playing for SJK in 2015

Personal information
- Full name: Bahrudin Atajić
- Date of birth: 16 November 1993 (age 33)
- Place of birth: Västervik, Sweden
- Height: 1.83 m (6 ft 0 in)
- Position: Striker

Youth career
- –2009: Malmö FF
- 2010–2013: Celtic

Senior career*
Years	Team	Apps	(Gls)
2013–2014	Celtic	4	(1)
2014	→ Shrewsbury Town (loan)	13	(0)
2015	SJK	19	(1)
2016–2017	Žalgiris	51	(15)
2018	Landskrona BoIS	14	(0)
2018–2020	Mladost Doboj Kakanj	43	(7)
2021	Gżira United	7	(1)
2022–2023	BK Olympic	38	(2)
2024–2025	Bosnien Hercegovinas SK	39	(1)

International career
2013–2014	Bosnia and Herzegovina U21	3	(0)

Managerial career
- 2025: FBK Balkan (assistant)
- 2026–: FBK Balkan
- * Club domestic league appearances and goals as of 8 November 2025

Bahrudin Atajić (born 16 November 1993) is a Bosnian football manager and former player.

He was born and grew up in Sweden and holds dual citizenship.

== Club career ==
Atajić signed for Celtic in January 2010 from Malmö FF. After years playing for the under-20 and development squads, Atajić signed a new contract with the club in 2013 that would keep him until the end of the season. He made his senior debut on 19 May 2013, in the Scottish Premier League. He scored his first goal for Celtic in a 5–0 rout of Motherwell at Fir Park on 6 December 2013. After the match, Atajić said: "I came on against Motherwell earlier in the season for the last 12 minutes and managed to score a goal. It was my first senior goal and obviously I was delighted with that."

He signed for English Football League One club Shrewsbury Town on loan on 24 January 2014. One day later, Atajić made his Shrewsbury debut, where he came on as a substitute for Tom Eaves in the 90th minute, as Shrewsbury Town lose 3–1 to Swindon Town. On 17 February 2014, Atajić was left out of the squad by Michael Jackson, citing his concerns with Atajić's fitness. For the remainder of the season, Atajić's playing time was slightly reduced and he went on to make thirteen appearances despite being on the bench.

Following his return with Shrewsbury Town came to an end, Atajić returned to Celtic and made several appearances in friendly matches, but was released in September 2014 after making four appearances in the league.

In February 2015, he signed one-year deal with SJK with an option to prolong for following year.

Before the 2016 season Atajić signed a contract with Žalgiris - defending champions of Lithuanian A Lyga. He helped his club to win domestic quadruple in 2016.

He joined Maltese side Gzira United in January 2021.

== International career ==
Although born in Sweden, Atajić has committed to play for Bosnia and Herzegovina on all levels of the game.

He was capped for the first time for Bosnia U21s in May 2014.

== Personal life ==
Atajić's family hails from Bosanska Gradiška, Bosnia and Herzegovina.

== Career statistics ==
As of 23 April 2014

Appearances and goals by club, season and competition
Club	Season	League			Cup		League cup		Europe		Total	
Club	Season	Division	Apps	Goals	Apps	Goals	Apps	Goals	Apps	Goals	Apps	Goals
Celtic	2012–13	Scottish Premiership	1	0	0	0	0	0	0	0	1	0
Celtic	2013–14	Scottish Premiership	3	1	0	0	0	0	0	0	3	1
Celtic	Total		4	1	0	0	0	0	0	0	4	1
Shrewsbury Town (loan)	2013–14	League One	13	0	0	0	0	0	–		13	0
SJK	2015	Veikkausliiga	19	1	1	0	5	3	2	0	27	4
SJK Akatemia	2015	Kakkonen	2	0	–		–		–		2	0
Žalgiris	2016	A Lyga	24	8	4	0	1	0	1	0	30	8
Žalgiris	2017	A Lyga	27	7	5	0	1	0	2	0	35	7
Žalgiris	Total		51	15	9	0	2	0	3	0	65	15
Landskrona BoIS	2018	Superettan	14	0	0	0	–		–		14	0
Mladost	2018–19	Bosnian Premier League	25	5	1	0	–		–		26	5
Mladost	2019–20	Bosnian Premier League	19	2	1	0	–		–		20	2
Mladost	Total		44	7	2	0	0	0	0	0	46	7
Gżira United	2020–21	Maltese Premier League	7	1	2	2	–		–		9	3
BK Olympic	2022	Ettan	16	1	–		–		–		16	1
BK Olympic	2023	Ettan	22	1	2	1	–		–		24	2
BK Olympic	Total		38	2	2	1	0	0	0	0	40	3
Bosnien Hercegovinas SK	2024	Swedish Division 3	19	0	–		–		–		19	0
Career total			211	26	16	3	7	3	5	0	239	32
