= Ignas Plūkas =

Lithuanian footballer

Personal information
- Full name: Ignas Plūkas
- Date of birth: 8 December 1993 (age 32)
- Place of birth: Kaunas, Lithuania
- Height: 1.95 m (6 ft 5 in)
- Position: Goalkeeper

Team information
- Current team: FK Sūduva
- Number: 31

Senior career*
Years	Team	Apps	(Gls)
2010–2011	FBK Kaunas (loan)	24	(0)
2013–2015	VMFD Žalgiris	20	(1)
2014	→ FC Šiauliai (loan)	17	(0)
2014–2015	→ FK Utenis Utena (loan)	20	(0)
2016–2018	FK Trakai	42	(0)
2018–2020	FK Sūduva	3	(0)
2021–2022	FC Hegelmann	65	(0)
2023–2024	FK Kauno Žalgiris	18	(0)
2025–	FK Sūduva	50	(0)

International career^{‡}
	Lithuania U19	2	(0)
2022–	Lithuania	1	(0)
- * Club domestic league appearances and goals as of 10 August 2026 ‡ National team caps and goals as of 31 March 2022

Ignas Plūkas (born 8 December 1993) is a Lithuanian professional footballer who plays as a goalkeeper for FK Sūduva. He played in the UEFA Europa League for FK Trakai five times and has been called up several times for the Lithuania national football team.
