= Egidijus Vaitkūnas =

Lithuanian footballer

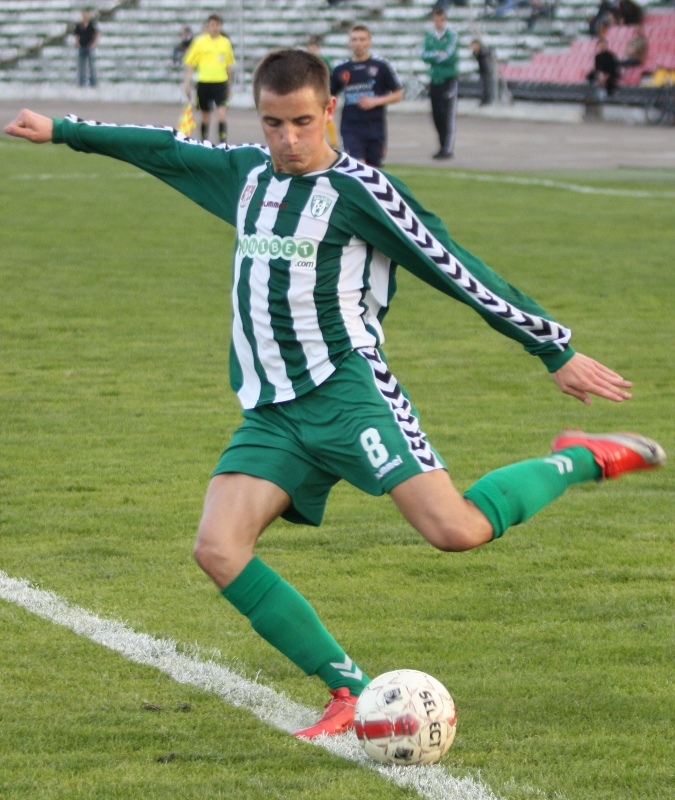

Personal information
- Date of birth: 8 August 1988 (age 38)
- Place of birth: Vilnius, Lithuanian SSR
- Height: 1.81 m (5 ft 11 in)
- Position: Right back

Senior career*
Years	Team	Apps	(Gls)
2006–2008	Žalgiris Vilnius	7	(1)
2009	Banga Gargždai	14	(1)
2009	Tauras Tauragė	10	(1)
2010–2017	Žalgiris Vilnius	195	(7)
2014	→ Bohemians 1905 (loan)	2	(0)
2018	Minsk	25	(0)
2019–2022	Kauno Žalgiris	97	(4)
2023–2024	FA Šiauliai	50	(0)
2025	FK Tauras Tauragė	23	(2)
2026	FK Riteriai	2	(0)

International career^{‡}
2009–2010	Lithuania U-21	13	(0)
2012–2020	Lithuania	57	(0)
- * Club domestic league appearances and goals as of 15 May 2026 ‡ National team caps and goals as of 26 January 2026

Egidijus Vaitkūnas (born 8 August 1988) is a Lithuanian former footballer who played as a right back.

== Achievements ==
FK Žalgiris (from Vilnius)

- 2012, 2013, 2014, 2015, 2016 Lithuanian Cup winner
- 2013, 2016, 2017 Lithuanian Super Cup winner
- 2013, 2015, 2016 Lithuanian Championship winner
