= 2013 A Lyga =

A Lyga
- Season: 2013
- Champions: VMFD Žalgiris Vilnius
- Relegated: Tauras
- Champions League: VMFD Žalgiris Vilnius (second qualifying round)
- Europa League: FK Atlantas, FK Ekranas (first qualifying round)
- Matches: 144
- Goals: 443 (3.08 per match)
- Top goalscorer: (Lithuania) Nerijus Valskis (FK Sūduva – 27 goals)
- Biggest home win: VMFD Žalgiris Vilnius 7-0 FK Dainava
- Biggest away win: FK Tauras 0-7 VMFD Žalgiris Vilnius
- Highest scoring: FK Ekranas 6-2 FK Kruoja
- Total attendance: 99,140
- Average attendance: 688

The 2013 A Lyga, also known as SMSCredit.lt A Lyga for sponsoring purposes, is the 24th season of the A Lyga, the top-tier association football league of Lithuania. The season started on 9 March 2013 and ended on 10 November 2013. FK Ekranas were the defending champions.

== Changes from 2012 ==
The league changed its number of teams for the fourth time in a row, reducing it from ten teams in 2012 A Lyga to nine sides. As a consequence, the schedule reduced from 36 to 32 matches per team, with each team playing every other team four times in total, twice at home and twice away.

=== Stadiums and locations ===
Location of teams in the 2013 A Lyga

Club	Location	Stadium	2012 season
FK Atlantas	Klaipėda	Žalgiris Stadium (Klaipėda)	8th
FK Banga Gargždai	Gargždai	Gargždai Stadium	6th
FK Dainava Alytus	Alytus	Alytus Stadium	7th
FK Ekranas	Panevėžys	Aukštaitija Stadium	1st
FK Kruoja Pakruojis	Pakruojis	Pakruojis Stadium	4th
FK Sūduva Marijampolė	Marijampolė	ARVI Football Arena	3rd
FK Šiauliai	Šiauliai	Savivaldybė Stadium	5th
FK Tauras Tauragė	Tauragė	Vytauto Stadium	9th
VMFD Žalgiris Vilnius	Vilnius	LFF Stadium	2nd

== League table ==
Pos	Team	Pld	W	D	L	GF	GA	GD	Pts	Qualification or relegation
1	Žalgiris (C)	32	22	7	3	77	19	+58	73	Qualification to Champions League second qualifying round
2	Atlantas	32	22	5	5	64	23	+41	71	Qualification to Europa League first qualifying round
3	Ekranas	32	20	4	8	58	34	+24	64	Qualification to Europa League first qualifying round
4	Sūduva	32	18	8	6	73	33	+40	62	
5	Kruoja	32	13	9	10	46	47	−1	48	
6	Banga	32	10	5	17	39	56	−17	35	Qualification to Europa League first qualifying round (Note: The runners-up of the 2013–14 Lithuanian Football Cup competition qualified for the first qualifying round of the 2014–15 UEFA Europa League.)
7	Šiauliai	32	6	7	19	34	65	−31	25	
8	Dainava	32	4	5	23	27	74	−47	17	
9	Tauras (R)	32	3	2	27	25	92	−67	11	Relegation to I Lyga

Source: UEFA.com LFF.lt
Rules for classification: 1) points; 2) goal difference; 3) number of goals scored.
(C) Champions; (R) Relegated

== Results ==
=== First half of season ===
Home \ Away	ATL	BAN	DAI	EKR	KRU	SŪD	ŠIA	TAU	ŽAL
Atlantas		3–0	6–1	1–1	2–0	2–2	1–3	4–0	0–1
Banga	0–1		4–1	0–2	0–0	1–2	1–1	2–0	1–5
FK Dainava	1–2	3–0		1–3	1–1	1–3	1–2	2–1	0–3
Ekranas	1–2	4–1	2–1		6–2	2–2	2–1	2–1	0–3
Kruoja	2–0	4–0	2–0	0–1		0–2	1–1	2–3	0–0
Sūduva	0–1	2–1	4–0	0–1	0–1		0–0	3–0	0–5
Šiauliai	0–1	1–4	1–5	1–4	3–4	1–1		4–2	1–1
Tauras	0–1	1–4	0–0	0–3	1–2	1–6	0–2		0–7
Žalgiris	1–2	4–2	7–0	2–0	4–0	2–0	1–0	1–0	

Source: UEFA.com
Legend: Blue = home team win; Yellow = draw; Red = away team win.

=== Second half of season ===
Home \ Away	ATL	BAN	DAI	EKR	KRU	SŪD	ŠIA	TAU	ŽAL
Atlantas		1–1	4–1	1–0	3–1	3–2	3–0	3–0	3–1
Banga	0–0		2–1	1–2	1–3	0–3	3–0	5–0	1–1
FK Dainava	0–5	0–1		0–3	1–1	0–5	0–1	1–3	0–1
Ekranas	1–0	2–0	2–1		1–3	1–3	3–1	5–0	1–1
Kruoja	1–2	1–0	0–0	1–0		2–4	0–0	2–1	0–0
Sūduva	1–1	2–0	4–0	0–0	4–0		3–0	3–1	1–1
Šiauliai	0–1	0–1	0–0	1–2	2–5	1–5		3–1	2–4
Tauras	0–5	1–2	0–4	0–1	2–3	3–3	3–1		0–3
Žalgiris	1–0	5–0	1–0	3–0	2–2	1–3	2–0	3–0	

Source: UEFA.com
Legend: Blue = home team win; Yellow = draw; Red = away team win.

== Top goalscorers ==
Pos.	Player	Club	Goals
1	(Lithuania) Nerijus Valskis	FK Sūduva	27
2	(Poland) Kamil Biliński	VMFD Žalgiris Vilnius	21
2	(Lithuania) Evaldas Razulis	FK Atlantas	21
3	(Lithuania) Aurelijus Staponka	FK Banga Gargždai	14
4	(Lithuania) Arsenij Buinickij	Ekranas	13
4	(Lithuania) Ričardas Beniušis	FK Kruoja Pakruojis	13
5	(Lithuania) Mantas Kuklys	VMFD Žalgiris Vilnius	11
