= Sportima Arena =

Sportima sports hall

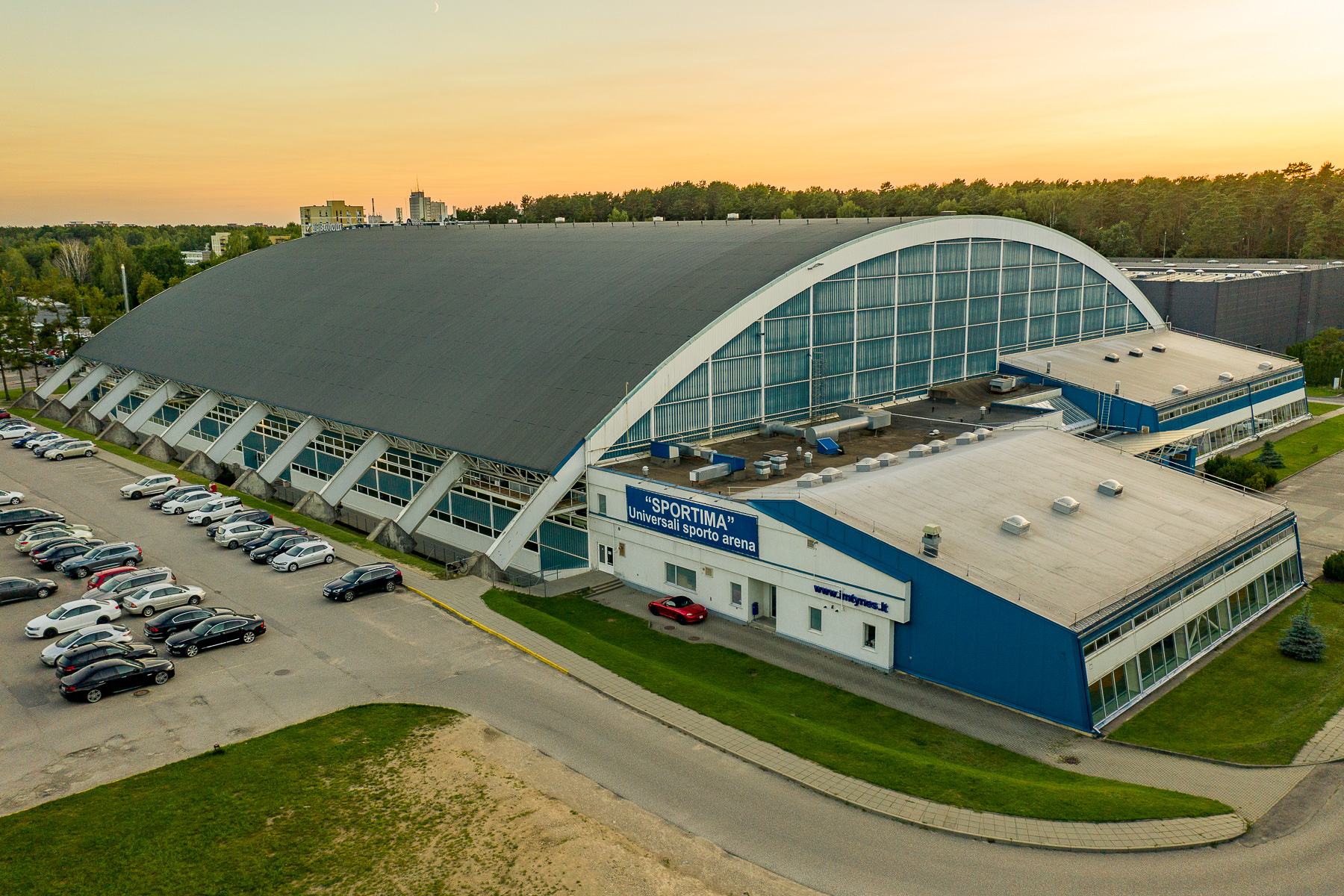
- Interactive map of Sportima Arena
- Former names: Viršuliškių sporto centro dengtas futbolo maniežas
- Location: Vilnius, Lithuania
- Coordinates: 54°42′30″N 25°14′11″E
- Owner: Ministry of Education, Science and Sport (via VĮ „Sportas ir poilsis“)
- Capacity: 3,157
- Record attendance: 3,342 (Žalgiris vs Sūduva Marijampolė, 10 March 2026)

Construction
- Built: 1989–2006
- Opened: October 30, 2001
- Cost: LTL 29 mil.

Website
- www.sportima.lt

Sportima Arena or Sportima Sports Hall is an indoor arena in Viršuliškės, Vilnius.

The arena has an indoor football field used for wrestling trainings.
