= Mantas Kuklys =

Lithuanian footballer

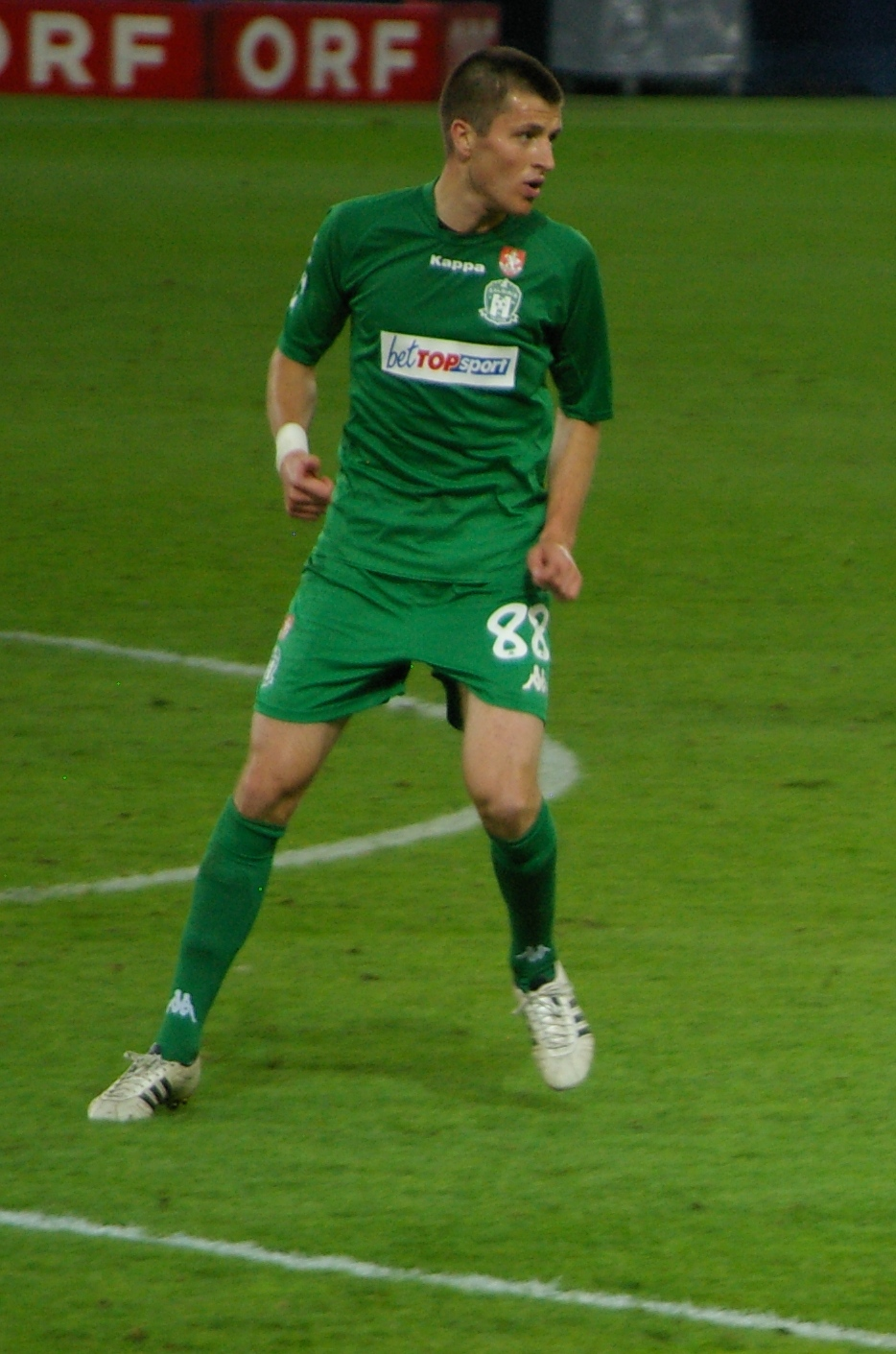

Personal information
- Date of birth: 10 June 1987 (age 39)
- Place of birth: Lithuania
- Height: 1.86 m (6 ft 1 in)
- Position: Midfielder

Senior career*
Years	Team	Apps	(Gls)
2006–2010	FK Šiauliai	110	(25)
2010–2012	K.V. Turnhout	30	(1)
2012–2018	Žalgiris	166	(41)
2014	→ Bohemians 1905 (loan)	8	(0)
2018–2019	Zhetysu	55	(7)
2020–2022	Žalgiris	60	(7)
2023–2024	FA Šiauliai	51	(1)

International career^{‡}
2012–2019	Lithuania	37	(0)
- * Club domestic league appearances and goals as of 07 January 2025 ‡ National team caps and goals as of 6 October 2019

Mantas Kuklys (born 10 June 1987) is a Lithuanian former professional footballer who played as a midfielder.
