= 2016 Lithuanian Football Cup =

Tournament details
- Country: Lithuania
- Teams: 59

Final positions
- Champions: Žalgiris Vilnius
- Runners-up: Sūduva Marijampolė

The 2016 Lithuanian Football Cup was the twenty-eighth season of the Lithuanian annual football knock-out tournament.

This season was the first time the tournament was played during a single calendar year since the regulations changed in 2007, and the final was played in September 2016.

The winners will qualify for the first qualifying round of the 2017–18 UEFA Europa League.

== First round ==
| Team 1 | Score | Team 2 |
7 May
| Elektrėnų Versmė (5) | 2–0 | Sendvaris (5) |
11 May
| Reaktyvas (5) | 1–3 | Kruša-Basica (4) |
14 May
| Saned (4) | 0–7 | Švyturys (4) |

== Second round ==
| Team 1 | Score | Team 2 |
10 May
| Kėdainiai (4) | 0–9 | Palanga (2) |
18 May
| Nevėžis (2) | 3–0 | F.B.K. Kaunas (2) |
| Pramogos-Ąžuolas (3) | 0–1 (a.e.t.) | Lokomotyvas (2) |
21 May
| Adiada (4) | w/o | Galinta (4) |
| Elektrėnų Versmė (5) | 5–3 (a.e.t.) | Visaginas (3) |
| Vova (5) | 3–5 | Švyturys (4) |
24 May
| Šilutė (2) | 0–0 (a.e.t.) (4–3 p) | Šilas (2) |
| Vilniaus Vytis (2) | 1–2 | DFK Dainava (2) |
| Juventa-99 (3) | 1–6 | SFK Rotalis (3) |
25 May
| Akmenės Cementas (3) | 0–0 (a.e.t.) (2–3 p) | Džiugas (2) |
26 May
| TEC (4) | 4–8 | ŠSPC Radviliškis (3) |
31 May
| Olimpija (4) | 0–8 | FM Ateitis (3) |
| Eurostandartas (4) | 3–1 | Širvėna (3) |
| FA Dainava (3) | 2–1 | Minija (2) |
| FKK Spartakas (4) | 1–3 | Banga (2) |
| Koralas (3) | 1–0 | Kražantė (2) |
1 June
| Viltis (3) | 0–3 | Sveikata (3) |
| Navigatoriai (4) | 1–1 (a.e.t.) (5–4 p) | Pakruojis (3) |
| Tera SŽK (3) | 0–5 | Panevėžys (2) |
| Euforija (5) | 3–8 | Kruša-Basica (4) |
3 June
| Babrungas (3) | 3–0 | Fakyrai-MRU (3) |
| Saulininkas (4) | 3–0 | Rūdupis (3) |
4 June
| Granitas (4) | 3–0 | Sarema (4) |
| Sportidus (4) | w/o | Lygis (3) |

== Round of 32 ==
| Team 1 | Score | Team 2 |
8 June
| Navigatoriai (4) | 1–3 | SFK Rotalis (3) |
11 June
| FA Dainava (3) | 1–6 | Palanga (2) |
| Sveikata (3) | 0–1 | Panevėžys (2) |
| Eurostandartas (4) | 2–4 (a.e.t.) | ŠSPC Radviliškis (3) |
| Lygis (3) | 0–2 | Trakai (1) |
| FM Ateitis (3) | 0–7 | Atlantas (1) |
| DFK Dainava (2) | 3–5 | Džiugas (2) |
12 June
| Lokomotyvas (2) | 2–3 | Banga (2) |
| Nevėžis (2) | 2–0 | Utenis (1) |
| Lietava (1) | 0–0 (a.e.t.) (5–6 p) | Sūduva (1) |
| Kruša-Basica (4) | 1–3 | Švyturys (4) |
16 June
| Babrungas (3) | 2–1 | Šilutė (2) |
| Adiada (4) | 2–1 | Saulininkas (4) |
18 June
| Elektrėnų Versmė (5) | 0–5 | Koralas (3) |
| Kauno Žalgiris (1) | 0–6 | Žalgiris (1) |
19 June
| Granitas (4) | 0–2 | Stumbras (1) |

== Round of 16 ==
| Team 1 | Score | Team 2 |
29 June
| Koralas (3) | 0–1 (a.e.t.) | Džiugas (2) |
5 July
| Švyturys (4) | 2–1 | Babrungas (3) |
| Adiada (4) | 2–2 (a.e.t.) (4–5 p) | ŠSPC Radviliškis (3) |
6 August
| SFK Rotalis (3) | 0–4 | Atlantas (1) |
| Banga (2) | 1–2 | Nevėžis (2) |
| Palanga (2) | 0–4 | Žalgiris (1) |
| Panevėžys (2) | 0–2 | Stumbras (1) |
7 August
| Sūduva (1) | 4–0 (a.e.t.) | Trakai (1) |

== Quarter-finals ==
| Team 1 | Score | Team 2 |
20 August
| Švyturys (4) | 1–10 | Sūduva (1) |
| Džiugas (2) | 1–2 | Atlantas (1) |
| Nevėžis (2) | 0–3 | Stumbras (1) |
| ŠSPC Radviliškis (3) | 0–7 | Žalgiris (1) |

== Semi-finals ==
| Team 1 | Score | Team 2 |
10 September
| Stumbras (1) | 0–2 | Sūduva (1) |
11 September
| Atlantas (1) | 1–2 | Žalgiris (1) |

== Final ==
The final took place on 25 September 2016, in the Central Stadium of Klaipėda

| Team 1 | Score | Team 2 |
|---|---|---|
| Sūduva (1) | 0–2 | Žalgiris (1) |
