= Lithuanian Supercup =

Annual football match held in Lithuania

The Lithuanian Supercup (Lithuanian: Lietuvos futbolo supertaurė) or LFF Supercup is an annual football match contested between the champions of the previous A Lyga season and the holders of the Lithuanian Football Cup. It is organised by and named after Lithuanian Football Federation and played at the beginning of the season. For sponsorship reasons, it is currently also known as the LFF TOPsport Supercup.

Until 2016, if the Lithuanian championship and the Cup was won by the same team, the match was not held and the Supercup was awarded automatically to the winning team. Since 2016 the format was changed and double winners then play the league runners-up.

The trophy has been contested since 1995 with four interruptions.

The current holders are Žalgiris Vilnius who defeated Banga in the 2025 Lithuanian Supercup.

== Sponsorship ==
Four companies signed title sponsorship agreements after the 2016 revisions of the competition regulations. The current tournament partner is Top sport who signed a broad league partnership agreement with the Lithuanian Football Federation in 2024.

Previously, Enlabs AB replaced Betsson in 2020 and then extended contract for a further two years in 2022. Betsson had signed a four-year deal with the Lithuanian Football Federation shortly after the 2017 competition, but only remained as the name holder for a two-year stint.

Period	Sponsor	Name
1995–2015	No sponsor	LFF Supercup
2016	Sportland International Group	LFF Sportland Supercup
2017	No sponsor	LFF Supercup
2018–2019	Betsson	LFF Betsafe Supercup
2020–2023	Enlabs AB	LFF Optibet Supercup
2024–current	Top sport	LFF TOPsport Supercup

== Past winners ==
Year	Winner	Runner-up	Score	City	MVP
1995	Inkaras-Grifas Kaunas	not played — Inkaras-Grifas Kaunas won the double			
1996	Kareda Šiauliai	Inkaras-Grifas Kaunas	2–1	Marijampolė	
1997	not held				
1998	Ekranas Panevėžys	Kareda Šiauliai	3–0	Kėdainiai	
1999	not held				
2000	not held				
2001	not held				
2002	FBK Kaunas	not played — FBK Kaunas won the double			
2003	Žalgiris Vilnius	FBK Kaunas	2–1	Šiauliai	
2004	FBK Kaunas	not played — FBK Kaunas won the double			
2006	Ekranas Panevėžys	FBK Kaunas	2–1	Palanga	
2007	FBK Kaunas	Sūduva Marijampolė	1–0	Marijampolė	
2008	FBK Kaunas	not played — FBK Kaunas won the double			
2009	Sūduva Marijampolė	Ekranas Panevėžys	0–0 (2–1 pen.)	Šiauliai	
2010	Ekranas Panevėžys	not played — Ekranas Panevėžys won the double			
2011	Ekranas Panevėžys	not played — Ekranas Panevėžys won the double			
2013	VMFD Žalgiris	Ekranas Panevėžys	1–0	Marijampolė	
2014	VMFD Žalgiris	not played — VMFD Žalgiris won the double			
2015	VMFD Žalgiris	not played — VMFD Žalgiris won the double			
2016	Žalgiris Vilnius	Trakai	1–1 (4–1 a.e.t.)	Vilnius	(Lithuania) Vytautas Lukša
2017	Žalgiris Vilnius	Trakai	1–0	Vilnius	(Lithuania) Vytautas Lukša
2018	Sūduva Marijampolė	Stumbras Kaunas	5–0	Marijampolė	(Lithuania) Ovidijus Verbickas
2019	Sūduva Marijampolė	Žalgiris Vilnius	2–0	Marijampolė	(Canada) Tosaint Ricketts
2020	Žalgiris Vilnius	Sūduva Marijampolė	1–0	Vilnius	(Lithuania) Saulius Mikoliūnas
2021	Panevėžys	Žalgiris Vilnius	2–2 (3–2 pen.)	Vilnius	(Brazil) Elivelto
2022	Sūduva Marijampolė	Žalgiris Vilnius	0–0 (3–2 pen.)	Vilnius	(Lithuania) Tomas Švedkauskas
2023	Žalgiris Vilnius	Kauno Žalgiris	1–1 (3–2 pen.)	Vilnius	(Lithuania) Ovidijus Verbickas
2024	Panevėžys	TransInvest	0–0 (5–4 pen.)	Vilnius	(Lithuania) Linas Klimavičius
2025	Žalgiris Vilnius	Banga	2–2 (3–2 pen.)	Vilnius	

== Performance by club ==
Clubs in italics are defunct.

Club	Winners	Runners-up
Žalgiris Vilnius	9	3
Sūduva Marijampolė	4	2
Ekranas Panevėžys	4	2
FBK Kaunas	4	2
Panevėžys	2	0
Inkaras-Grifas Kaunas	1	1
Kareda Šiauliai	1	1
Trakai / Riteriai	—N/a	2
Kauno Žalgiris	—N/a	1
TransInvest	—N/a	1
Banga	—N/a	1
