= 2017 Lithuanian Football Cup final =

2017 LFF Cup final
- Event: 2017 Lithuanian Football Cup
Žalgiris	Stumbras
0	1
- Date: 24 September 2017
- Venue: Aukštaitija Stadium, Panevėžys
- Man of the Match: Nasro Bouchareb
- Referee: Saulius Dirda
- Attendance: 1,478
- Weather: Clear; 18 °C (64 °F); 54% humidity

The 2017 Lithuanian Football Cup final was the 72nd Lithuanian Football Cup final and took place on 24 September 2017 between Žalgiris and Stumbras. Stumbras qualified for the final for the first time in its history, while Žalgiris were the defending champions, having won the last six finals in the row. Stumbras won the final 1–0 after a late goal by Nasro Bouchareb, who was selected player of the match. Kaunas' side became first club to win the final from their first try after Neris Vilnius did it in 1992 and also managed to break Žalgiris domestic dominance of 14 straight titles in the last 5 years.

Stumbras also qualified for the 2018–19 UEFA Europa League first qualifying round and earned the right to play in the 2018 Lithuanian Supercup.

== Route to the final ==
Žalgiris					Stumbras
Opponent	Result	Leg	Scorers	Round	Opponent	Result	Leg	Scorers
Banga (II)	1–1 (3–1 p)	away	Ljujić	Round of 32	Šilutė (II)	1–0	away	Lopes
Atlantas	1–0	home	Elivelto	Round of 16	Prelegentai (Vet)	8–0	away	Konikas (3), Kalvaitis (o.g.), Artimavičius (2), Armalas, Sekgota
Panerys (III)	8–0	away	Oyarzún, Uzėla (2), Lukša (2), Stočkūnas (2), Šernas	Quarter-finals	Jonava	5–3 (a.e.t.)	away	Clifford, Villela (3), Sekgota
Sūduva	2–2 (4–2 p)	away	Vaitkūnas, Antal	Semi-finals	Vilniaus Vytis (II)	1–1 (4–2 p)	away	Nazaré

== Pre-match ==
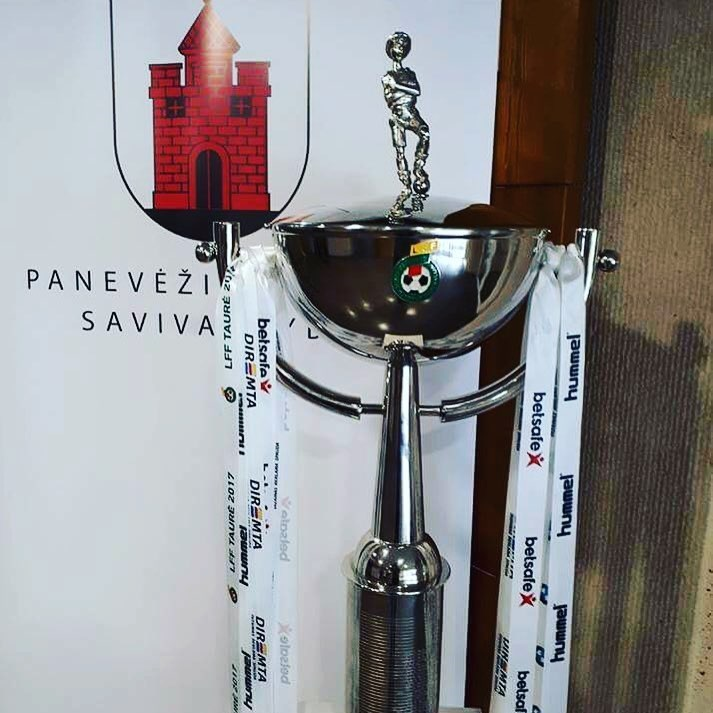
LFF cup in Panevėžys city municipality.

=== Awareness ===
Match attracted a lot of attention from the local press, as well as some from the international sources, mostly from Portugal.

Portuguese President Marcelo Rebelo de Sousa event came to visit and wish luck to Stumbras during his international trip to Lithuania.

On the other hand, most A Lyga clubs will support Žalgiris, mainly due to rules related with UEFA Europa League qualification.

=== Transport ===
Before the final Lithuanian Football Federation organized special buses for the local fans of both clubs that will allow to comfortably reach the final venue from Vilnius and Kaunas.

=== Trophy ===
On 19 September 2017, interim Lithuanian Football Federation president Vidmantas Butkevičius transferred LFF Cup trophy to Panevėžys city municipality and its mayor Rytis Mykolas Račkauskas. It'll be displayed there until the game.

== Match ==
24 September 2017
16:00 EEST (UTC+3)

Žalgiris	0–1	Stumbras
	Summary; Video; Goal	Bouchareb 84'

Aukštaitija Stadium, Panevėžys
Attendance: 1,478
Referee: Saulius Dirda (Lithuania)

Žalgiris	Stumbras

GK	1	(Lithuania) Armantas Vitkauskas
RB	8	(Lithuania) Egidijus Vaitkūnas (c)	(yellow card) 84'
CB	6	(Senegal) Mamadou Mbodj
CB	2	(Lithuania) Linas Klimavičius	(yellow card) 88'
LB	5	(Netherlands) Donovan Slijngard
CM	88	(Lithuania) Mantas Kuklys
CM	7	(Croatia) Slavko Blagojević
RW	21	(Romania) Liviu Antal		(substituted off) 72'
AM	27	(Serbia) Matija Ljujić		(substituted off) 87'
LW	80	(Brazil) Elivelto	(yellow card) 77'
CF	10	(Lithuania) Darvydas Šernas
Substitutes:
GK	29	(Lithuania) Džiugas Bartkus
DF	4	(Chile) Diego Oyarzún
DF	23	(Lithuania) Rolandas Baravykas
MF	16	(Mali) Mahamane Traoré
MF	19	(Lithuania) Daniel Romanovskij
MF	21	(Lithuania) Vytautas Lukša		(substituted on) 72'
FW	9	(Bosnia and Herzegovina) Bahrudin Atajić		(substituted on) 87'
Manager:
(Lithuania) Valdas Dambrauskas

GK	1	(Brazil) Rodrigo Josviaki
RB	31	(Brazil) Marcos Junior
CB	3	(Portugal) André Almeida	(yellow card) 37'
CB	20	(Lithuania) Tomas Snapkauskas (c)
LB	5	(São Tomé and Príncipe) Jardel Nazaré
RM	8	(Lithuania) Vilius Armanavičius	(yellow card) 66'
CM	23	(Lithuania) Dominykas Barauskas
LM	80	(Portugal) Fábio Lopes
RF	9	(Georgia (country)) Levan Macharashvili		(substituted off) 55'
CF	70	(France) Alexandre Kore		(substituted off) 76'
LF	7	(Brazil) Lucas Villela		(substituted off) 90+3'
Substitutes:
GK	12	(Serbia) Nemanja Bjelan
MF	10	(Lithuania) Klaidas Janonis		(substituted on) 90+3'
MF	26	(South Africa) Kgaogelo Sekgota
MF	30	(Lithuania) Dominykas Galkevičius
MF	35	(Brazil) Joao Victor
FW	25	(South Africa) Jaisen Clifford		(substituted on) 55'
FW	55	(France) Nasro Bouchareb		(substituted on) 76'
Manager:
(Portugal) Mariano Barreto

Man of the Match:
Nasro Bouchareb (Stumbras)

Assistant referees:
Arūnas Dapkus (Lithuania)
Edgaras Bučinskas (Lithuania)
Fourth official:
Mantas Pomeckis (Lithuania)
Additional assistant referees:
Manfredas Lukjančukas (Lithuania)
Mindaugas Jackus (Lithuania)

Match rules

- 90 minutes.
- 30 minutes of extra time if necessary.
- Penalty shoot-out if scores still level.
- Seven named substitutes, of which up to three may be used.
