= 2017 FK Žalgiris season =

Žalgiris
2017 season
- Chairwoman: Vilma Venslovaitienė
- Manager: Valdas Dambrauskas
- Stadium: LFF Stadionas
- A Lyga: 2nd
- LFF Supercup: Winners
- LFF Cup: Quarter-finals
- UEFA Champions League (17–18): Second qualifying round
- Top goalscorer: League: Darvydas Šernas (10 goals); All: Darvydas Šernas (10 goals)
- Highest home attendance: 2,918 (Feb. 26 vs. Trakai)
- Lowest home attendance: 300 (Jun 24 vs. Atlantas)
- Average home league attendance: 1,052
- Biggest win: Utenis 0–4 Žalgiris (25 April 2017)
- Biggest defeat: FK Sūduva 3–0 Žalgiris (22 October 2017)
- All statistics correct as of 1 August 2017.

The 2017 season will be Žalgiris 8th consecutive season in the top flight of Lithuanian football and 4th consecutive as A Lyga title defenders. They will also participate in the Lithuanian Cup, SuperCup and enter the UEFA Champions League at the second qualifying round stage.

== Players ==
Squad No.	Name	Nat.	Position(s)	Date of birth (age)	Signed from	Signed in
Goalkeepers
1	Armantas Vitkauskas	(Lithuania)	GK	23 March 1989 (age 37)	(Lithuania) Sūduva	2012
29	Džiugas Bartkus	(Lithuania)	GK	7 November 1989 (age 37)	(Malta) Valletta	2017
30	Airidas Mickevičius	(Lithuania)	GK	7 July 1999 (age 27)	Academy	2017
35	Pijus Petkevičius	(Lithuania)	GK	17 May 1999 (age 27)	Academy	2017
Defenders
2	Linas Klimavičius	(Lithuania)	CB	10 April 1989 (age 37)	(Lithuania) Trakai	2016
4	Diego Oyarzún	(Chile)	CB / LB	19 January 1993 (age 33)	(Chile) Palestino	2017
5	Donovan Slijngard	(Netherlands)	LB	28 August 1987 (age 39)	(Netherlands) Cambuur	2015
6	Mamadou Mbodj	(Senegal)	CB	12 March 1993 (age 33)	(Serbia) Red Star Belgrade	2016
8	Egidijus Vaitkūnas	(Lithuania)	RB	8 August 1988 (age 38)	(Lithuania) Tauras	2010
23	Rolandas Baravykas	(Lithuania)	RB / LB	23 August 1995 (age 31)	(Lithuania) Atlantas	2017
71	Jonas Skinderis	(Lithuania)	CB	4 April 1997 (age 29)	(Lithuania) Panevėžys	2016
Midfielders
7	Slavko Blagojević	(Croatia)	CM	21 March 1987 (age 39)	(Croatia) RNK Split	2016
13	Saulius Mikoliūnas	(Lithuania)	RB / RW / LW	2 May 1984 (age 42)	(Belarus) Shakhtyor Soligorsk	2016
14	Karolis Uzėla	(Lithuania)	CM	11 March 2000 (age 26)	Academy	2017
16	Mahamane Traoré	(Mali)	CM	31 August 1988 (age 38)	(France) Nice	2017
17	Liviu Antal	(Romania)	RW / SS	2 June 1989 (age 37)	(Romania) CFR Cluj	2017
19	Daniel Romanovskij	(Lithuania)	CM	19 June 1996 (age 30)	Academy	2014
21	Vytautas Lukša	(Lithuania)	RW / LW	14 August 1984 (age 42)	(Lithuania) Trakai	2015
22	Justas Lasickas	(Lithuania)	LW	6 October 1997 (age 29)	Academy	2014
27	Matija Ljujić	(Serbia)	CM / AM	28 October 1993 (age 33)	(Serbia) Rad	2016
44	Serge Nyuiadzi	(Togo)	LW / RW	17 September 1991 (age 35)	(Turkey) 1461 Trabzon	2017
75	Ernestas Stočkūnas	(Lithuania)	MF	26 April 1998 (age 28)	Academy	2015
88	Mantas Kuklys	(Lithuania)	CM / AM	10 June 1987 (age 39)	(Belgium) Turnhout	2012
Forwards
9	Bahrudin Atajić	(Bosnia and Herzegovina)	AM / LW / RW / CF / SS	16 November 1993 (age 32)	(Finland) SJK Seinäjoki	2016
10	Darvydas Šernas	(Lithuania)	CF	22 July 1984 (age 42)	(Turkey) Alanyaspor	2017
28	Julius Momkus	(Lithuania)	ST	28 February 1998 (age 28)	Academy	2016
80	Elivelto	(Brazil)	CM / AM / LW / RW / SS	2 January 1992 (age 34)	(Lithuania) Ekranas	2015

== Transfers ==
=== Winter 2017 ===
==== In ====
Pos.	Player	Age	Moving from	Notes	Source
MF	(Mali) Mahamane Traoré	28	(France) OGC Nice	Free transfer	
FW	(Lithuania) Darvydas Šernas	32	(Turkey) Alanyaspor	Free transfer	
DF	(Lithuania) Rolandas Baravykas	21	(Lithuania) FK Atlantas	Free transfer	
MF	(Togo) Serge Nyuiadzi	25	(Turkey) 1461 Trabzon	Free transfer	
FW	(Serbia) Komnen Andrić	21	(Portugal) C.F. Os Belenenses	On loan until July 2017	
DF	(Lithuania) Georgas Freidgeimas	29	(Kazakhstan) FC Irtysh Pavlodar	End of loan spell	
MF	(Lithuania) Daniel Romanovskij	19	(Lithuania) FK Utenis	End of loan spell	
FW	(Lithuania) Simonas Stankevičius	21	(Croatia) HNK Šibenik	End of loan spell	
MF	(Lithuania) Tautvydas Eliošius	24	(Lithuania) FK Jonava	End of loan spell	

==== Out ====
Pos.	Player	Age	Moving to	Notes	Source
FW	(Lithuania) Simonas Stankevičius	21	(Norway) Mjøndalen IF	Undisclosed	
FW	(Serbia) Andrija Kaluđerović	29	(Thailand) Port F.C.	Free transfer	
MF	(Lithuania) Linas Pilibaitis	31	(Lithuania) FK Atlantas	Free transfer	
MF	(Croatia) Marin Matoš	27	(Croatia) HNK Gorica	Free transfer	
MF	(Lithuania) Tautvydas Eliošius	25	(Lithuania) FK Jonava	Free transfer	
DF	(Lithuania) Aldas Korsakas	20	(Lithuania) FC Stumbras	Free transfer	
FW	(Lithuania) Darius Kazubovičius	21	(Lithuania) FK Trakai	Free transfer	
DF	(Lithuania) Lukas Valvonis	19	(Lithuania) FK Utenis	Free transfer	
FW	(Lithuania) Edvinas Baniulis	19	(Lithuania) FK Utenis	Free transfer	
GK	(Lithuania) Karolis Čirba	19	(Lithuania) FC Vilniaus Vytis	Free transfer	
MF	(Lithuania) Daniel Romanovskij	20	(Lithuania) FC Stumbras	On loan until 2018	
DF	(Lithuania) Dominykas Barauskas	19	(Lithuania) FC Stumbras	On loan until 2018	
DF	(Lithuania) Marius Žaliūkas	33		Released	
MF	(Portugal) Jorge Chula	27		Released	

=== Summer 2017 ===
==== In ====
Pos.	Player	Age	Moving from	Notes	Source
MF	(Romania) Liviu Antal	28	(Romania) CFR Cluj	Free transfer	
DF	(Chile) Diego Oyarzún	24	(Chile) Club Deportivo Palestino	Free transfer	
GK	(Lithuania) Džiugas Bartkus	27	(Malta) Valletta F.C.	Free transfer	
MF	(Lithuania) Daniel Romanovskij	21	(Lithuania) FC Stumbras	End of loan spell	

==== Out ====
Pos.	Player	Age	Moving to	Notes	Source
DF	(Lithuania) Georgas Freidgeimas	29	(Kazakhstan) FC Okzhetpes	Undisclosed	
FW	(Serbia) Komnen Andrić	21	(Portugal) C.F. Os Belenenses	Loan return	
GK	(Lithuania) Saulius Klevinskas	33		Released	

== Pre-season and friendlies ==
21 January 2017 Friendly	Žalgiris (Lithuania)	1–0	(Poland) Wigry Suwałki	Vilnius, Lithuania
16:30 EET (UTC+2)	Vytautas Lukša 41'	Report	Rafał Augustyniak (penalty missed) 68'	Stadium: Sportima Arena; Referee: Robertas Valikonis

26 January 2017 Friendly	Žalgiris (Lithuania)	0–4	(Latvia) RFS	Vilnius, Lithuania
12:30 EET (UTC+2)	Vytautas Lukša (red card) 39'	Report	Aleksandrs Fertovs 17'; Aleksejs Višņakovs 23', 28'; Daniils Hvoiņickis 90'	Stadium: Sportima Arena

3 February 2017 Friendly	Žalgiris (Lithuania)	1–0	(Slovakia) Slovan Bratislava	Side, Turkey
15:30 FET (UTC+3)	Mamadou Mbodj 33'	Report		Stadium: Emirhan Sports Complex

6 February 2017 Friendly	Dinamo Minsk (Belarus)	1–0	(Lithuania) Žalgiris	Belek, Turkey
17:00 FET (UTC+3)	Oleksandr Noyok (yellow card) 14' (red card) 78'; Roman Begunov (yellow card) 18' (red card) 21'; Artyom Kiyko 87'	Report		Stadium: Riu Kaya

9 February 2017 Friendly	Žalgiris (Lithuania)	3–2	(Russia) Sibir Novosibirsk	Side, Turkey
17:00 FET (UTC+3)	Darvydas Šernas 80'; Matija Ljujić 87'; Linas Klimavičius 90+2'	Report	Maksim Andreyev 34'; Nikita Bezlikhotnov (penalty missed) 55' 57'	Stadium: Emirhan Sports Complex

10 February 2017 Friendly	Žalgiris (Lithuania)	1–2	(Georgia (country)) Samtredia	Side, Turkey
16:00 FET (UTC+3)	Komnen Andrić 17'	Report	Giuli Mandzhgaladze 38', 90+2'	Stadium: Emirhan Sports Complex

13 February 2017 Friendly	Žalgiris (Lithuania)	1–0	(Slovenia) Olimpija Ljubljana	Side, Turkey
16:00 FET (UTC+3)	Saulius Mikoliūnas (red card) 45'; Darvydas Šernas 82'	Report		Stadium: Emirhan Sports Complex

15 February 2017 Friendly	Shakhtyor Soligorsk (Belarus)	1–1	(Lithuania) Žalgiris	Colakli, Turkey
16:00 FET (UTC+3)	Dzyanis Laptsew (penalty missed) 32'; Sergei Khizhnichenko 72'	Report	Donovan Slijngard (red card) 31'; Komnen Andrić 41'	Stadium: Selin Kamelya Hotel

20 February 2017 Friendly	Žalgiris (Lithuania)	1–0	(Estonia) Flora	Vilnius, Lithuania
12:00 EET (UTC+2)	Mamadou Mbodj 89'	Report		Stadium: Sportima Arena; Attendance: 200

7 June 2017 Friendly	Liepāja (Latvia)	1–0	(Lithuania) Žalgiris	Liepāja, Latvia
19:30 EEST (UTC+3)	Kristaps Grebis 73'	Report		Stadium: Daugava Stadium

27 June 2017 Friendly	Žalgiris (Lithuania)	3–1	(Sweden) IFK Göteborg	Vilnius, Lithuania
21:00 EEST (UTC+3)	Elivelto 28'; Darvydas Šernas 61'; Liviu Antal 90+2'	Report	Tobias Hysén 15'	Stadium: LFF Stadium

6 July 2017 Friendly	BATE Borisov (Belarus)	1–1	(Lithuania) Žalgiris	Barysaw, Belarus
19:00 EEST (UTC+3)	Yury Kendysh 74'	Report	Matija Ljujić 29'	Stadium: Borisov Arena

== Competitions ==
=== Lithuanian Supercup ===
26 February 2017	Žalgiris	1–0	Trakai	Vilnius, Lithuania
14:45 EET (UTC+2)	Mahamane Traoré 76'	Report	Darius Kazubovičius (yellow card) 46'; Pavel Kruk (yellow card) 72'	Stadium: Sportima Arena; Attendance: 2,918; Referee: Robertas Valikonis

=== A Lyga ===
==== Results summary ====
Overall								Home						Away					
Pld	W	D	L	GF	GA	GD	Pts	W	D	L	GF	GA	GD	W	D	L	GF	GA	GD
31	19	7	5	57	26	+31	64	11	2	3	33	12	+21	8	5	2	24	14	+10

Last updated: 4 November 2017.
Source: Competitive matches

==== Results by round ====
Round	1	2	3	4	5	6	7	8	9	10	11	12	13	14	15	16	17	18	19	20	21	22	23	24	25	26	27	28	29	30	31	32	33
Ground	A	H	H	A	H	A	H	A	H	H	A	H	A	A	H	A	H	A	H	H	A	H	A	H	A	A	H	A	A	H	H		
Result	W	L	W	W	W	W	W	W	W	W	W	D	D	L	W	W	W	D	W	D	D	W	D	W	W	D	L	L	W	W	L		
Position	1	4	1	1	1	1	1	1	1	1	1	1	1	1	1	1	1	1	1	1	1	1	1	1	1	1	1	2	2	2	2		

Updated to match(es) played on 4 November 2017. Source: Competitive matches
A = Away; H = Home; W = Win; D = Draw; L = Loss

==== Regular season ====
===== League table =====
Pos	Team	Pld	W	D	L	GF	GA	GD	Pts	Qualification or relegation
1	Sūduva	28	17	8	3	65	28	+37	59	Qualification to Championship round
2	Žalgiris	28	17	7	4	51	22	+29	58	Qualification to Championship round
3	Trakai	28	15	9	4	45	22	+23	54	Qualification to Championship round
4	Atlantas	28	8	9	11	33	33	0	33	Qualification to Championship round
5	Utenis	28	8	8	12	24	41	−17	32	Qualification to Championship round

Source: A Lyga (in Lithuanian), UEFA, Soccerway
Rules for classification: 1) Points; 2) Head-to-head points; 3) Head-to-head goal difference; 4) Head-to-head goals scored; 5) Head-to-head matches won; 6) Goal difference; 7) Goals scored; 8) Matches won.

===== Matches =====
4 March 2017 1	Atlantas	1–2	Žalgiris	Klaipėda, Lithuania
13:00 EET (UTC+2)	Andrei Panyukov 62' (yellow card) 74'	Report	Mantas Kuklys 21' (pen.); Elivelto 27' (yellow card) 69'; Rolandas Baravykas (yellow card) 55'; Matija Ljujić (yellow card) 90+1'	Stadium: Klaipėda Artificial Football Pitch; Attendance: 1,300; Referee: Donatas Rumšas

12 March 2017 2	Žalgiris	0–1	Utenis	Vilnius, Lithuania
19:30 EET (UTC+2)	Saulius Mikoliūnas (yellow card) 45+1'; Egidijus Vaitkūnas (yellow card) 90+5'	Report	Edvinas Baniulis 41' (yellow card) 59'; Aurimas Tručinskas (yellow card) 75'; Dejan Garača (yellow card) 90'; Vladislav Nikitin (yellow card) 90+3'	Stadium: Sportima Arena; Attendance: 1,000; Referee: Darius Petraška

16 March 2017 3	Žalgiris	1–0	Kauno Žalgiris	Vilnius, Lithuania
19:30 EET (UTC+2)	Elivelto 65'	Report		Stadium: Sportima Arena; Attendance: 1,000; Referee: Mindaugas Jackus

29 March 2017 4	Trakai	0–1	Žalgiris	Vilnius, Lithuania
18:00 EEST (UTC+3)	Arūnas Klimavičius (yellow card) 80'; Tadas Labukas (yellow card) 90'	Report	Mantas Kuklys (yellow card) 59'; Matija Ljujić (yellow card) 69'; Slavko Blagojević (yellow card) 78'; Vytautas Lukša 87'	Stadium: Sportima Arena; Attendance: 1,000; Referee: Gediminas Mažeika

5 April 2017 5	Žalgiris	2–1	Jonava	Vilnius, Lithuania
20:00 EEST (UTC+3)	Armantas Vitkauskas (red card) 20'; Georgas Freidgeimas (yellow card) 41'; Komnen Andrić (yellow card) 55'; Elivelto 57', 65'; Egidijus Vaitkūnas (yellow card) 68'	Report	Benas Spietinis (yellow card) 17'; Tomas Salamanavičius (yellow card) 55'; Andrey Chukhley (yellow card) 80'; Davit Makaradze 90+4'	Stadium: Sportima Arena; Attendance: 850; Referee: Darius Petraška

12 April 2017 6	Stumbras	1–3	Žalgiris	Kaunas, Lithuania
18:00 EEST (UTC+3)	Lukas Artimavičius (yellow card) 32'; Levan Macharashvili 75'; Klaidas Janonis (yellow card) 86'; André Almeida (yellow card) 87'	Report	Darvydas Šernas 48', 64', 85' (yellow card) 90+3'; Mamadou Mbodj (yellow card) 86'	Stadium: NFA Stadium; Attendance: 150; Referee: Manfredas Lukjančukas

19 April 2017 7	Žalgiris	3–1	Sūduva	Vilnius, Lithuania
20:00 EEST (UTC+3)	Darvydas Šernas 17' (pen.), 36', 65' (yellow card) 44'; Matija Ljujić (yellow card) 34'; Slavko Blagojević (yellow card) 45'; Mamadou Mbodj (yellow card) 71'; Egidijus Vaitkūnas (yellow card) 90+1'	Report	Povilas Leimonas 7' (yellow card) 52'; Andro Švrljuga (yellow card) 19'	Stadium: LFF Stadium; Attendance: 600; Referee: Gediminas Mažeika

25 April 2017 8	Utenis	0–4	Žalgiris	Visaginas, Lithuania
18:00 EEST (UTC+3)	Edvinas Baniulis (yellow card) 2'; Gabrielius Zagurskas (yellow card) 33'; Rudinilson (yellow card) 56'	Report	Elivelto 22', 71'; Bahrudin Atajić 66'; Saulius Mikoliūnas (yellow card) 73'; Serge Nyuiadzi 78'	Stadium: Visaginas Artificial Football Pitch; Attendance: 350; Referee: Jurijus Paškovskis

30 April 2017 9	Žalgiris	1–0	Atlantas	Vilnius, Lithuania
18:30 EEST (UTC+3)	Elivelto 20'; Slavko Blagojević (yellow card) 53'; Egidijus Vaitkūnas (yellow card) 65'; Georgas Freidgeimas (yellow card) 90+3'	Report	Donatas Kazlauskas (yellow card) 20'; Andrei Panyukov (yellow card) 53'; Markas Beneta (yellow card) 78'	Stadium: LFF Stadium; Attendance: 1,000; Referee: Gediminas Mažeika

3 May 2017 10	Žalgiris	4–1	Stumbras	Vilnius, Lithuania
20:00 EEST (UTC+3)	Bahrudin Atajić 9', 13'; Komnen Andrić 15'; Linas Klimavičius (yellow card) 26'; Mantas Kuklys 89'	Report	Daniel Romanovskij 90+1'	Stadium: LFF Stadium; Attendance: 500; Referee: Darius Petraška

10 May 2017 11	Jonava	0–2	Žalgiris	Jonava, Lithuania
18:00 EEST (UTC+3)	Artūras Rocys (yellow card) 56' (yellow card) 65' (red card); Vitalijs Barinovs (yellow card) 59'	Report	Slavko Blagojević 18'; Serge Nyuiadzi (yellow card) 40' (yellow card) 69' (red card); Elivelto 43'; Georgas Freidgeimas (yellow card) 45+1'	Stadium: Jonava Artificial Football Pitch; Attendance: 450; Referee: Manfredas Lukjančukas

16 May 2017 12	Žalgiris	1–1	Trakai	Vilnius, Lithuania
20:00 EEST (UTC+3)	Mantas Kuklys 32'; Mamadou Mbodj (yellow card) 82'	Report	Pavel Kruk (yellow card) 37'; Oscar Dorley 49'; Justinas Januševskij (yellow card) 56'	Stadium: LFF Stadium; Attendance: 1,750; Referee: Robertas Valikonis

24 May 2017 13	Sūduva	0–0	Žalgiris	Marijampolė, Lithuania
18:00 EEST (UTC+3)	Marius Činikas (yellow card) 81'	Report		Stadium: ARVI Football Arena; Attendance: 1,100; Referee: Gediminas Mažeika

1 June 2017 14	Kauno Žalgiris	2–0	Žalgiris	Kaunas, Lithuania
18:00 EEST (UTC+3)	Aurimas Raginis (yellow card) 27'; Ernestas Mickevičius 28'; Ignas Dedura (yellow card) 60'; Mario Duque 66'; Edgaras Kloniūnas (yellow card) 85'	Report		Stadium: Darius and Girėnas Stadium; Attendance: 100; Referee: Mindaugas Jackus

14 June 2017 15	Žalgiris	3–0	Atlantas	Vilnius, Lithuania
18:00 EEST (UTC+3)	Markas Beneta 23' (o.g.); Darvydas Šernas 46', 59'	Report	Donatas Kazlauskas (yellow card) 11'	Stadium: LFF Stadium; Attendance: 600; Referee: Manfredas Lukjančukas

20 June 2017 16	Jonava	1–2	Žalgiris	Jonava, Lithuania
18:00 EEST (UTC+3)	Klaudijus Upstas 13' (yellow card) 72' (yellow card) 79' (red card); Laurynas Stonkus (yellow card) 26'; Arnas Paškevičius (yellow card) 34'; Tautvydas Eliošius (yellow card) 84'; Povilas Valinčius (yellow card) 90+1'	Report	Darvydas Šernas 29'; Matija Ljujić (yellow card) 33'; Donovan Slijngard (yellow card) 75'; Mamadou Mbodj (yellow card) 82'; Linas Klimavičius 90+1'	Stadium: Central Stadium of Jonava; Attendance: 400; Referee: Darius Petraška

22 July 2017 17	Žalgiris	1–0	Stumbras	Vilnius, Lithuania
19:00 EEST (UTC+3)	Egidijus Vaitkūnas (yellow card) 15'; Darvydas Šernas 33' (yellow card) 71'; Vytautas Lukša (yellow card) 68'; Slavko Blagojević (yellow card) 82'	Report	Tomas Snapkauskas (yellow card) 37'; Lukas Artimavičius (yellow card) 62'	Stadium: LFF Stadium; Attendance: 600; Referee: Manfredas Lukjančukas

25 July 2017 18	Kauno Žalgiris	1–1	Žalgiris	Kaunas, Lithuania
18:00 EEST (UTC+3)	Mario Duque 11'; Ignas Dedura (yellow card) 50'; Lukas Kochanauskas (yellow card) 73'	Report	Mahamane Traore (yellow card) 17'; Mantas Kuklys 38'; Mamadou Mbodj (yellow card) 75'	Stadium: Darius and Girėnas Stadium; Attendance: 250; Referee: Darius Petraška

2 August 2017 19	Žalgiris	5-0	Utenis	Vilnius, Lithuania
20:00 EEST (UTC+3)	Elivelto (yellow card) 4' (goal) 16'; Šernas 26' 64'; Nyuiadzi 37'; Atajić 77'	Report	Yassine Kharbouch (yellow card) 17'; Diedie Traore (yellow card) 45'; Carlos Carrasco (yellow card) 58'	Stadium: LFF Stadium; Attendance: 700; Referee: (Lithuania) Saulius Dirda

9 August 2017 20	Žalgiris	1-1	Sūduva	Vilnius, Lithuania
20:00 EEST (UTC+3)	Nyuiadzi (yellow card) 45+1'; Klimavičius (yellow card) 45+2'; Kuklys 50' (pen.); Vaitkūnas (yellow card) 83'	Report	Leimonas (yellow card) 45+2'; Činikas (yellow card) 49'; Švrljuga (yellow card) 60'; Kerla 79'; Robertas Vėževičius (yellow card) 90+1'	Stadium: LFF Stadium; Attendance: 1,100; Referee: (Lithuania) Manfredas Lukjančukas

12 August 2017 21	Trakai	2-2	Žalgiris	Vilnius, Lithuania
19:00 EEST (UTC+3)	Klimavičius 20' (pen.) 58' (pen.); Šilėnas (yellow card) 25'; Borovskij (yellow card) 40'; Modestas Vorobjovas (yellow card) 63'; Kruk (yellow card) 64'	Report	Šernas 12'; Nyuiadzi (yellow card) 32'; Oyarzún (yellow card) 41'; Elivelto 61'; Blagojević (yellow card) 65'; Mbodji (yellow card) 67'; Klimavičius (yellow card) 70'	Stadium: LFF Stadium; Attendance: 450; Referee: (Lithuania) Gediminas Mažeika

16 August 2017 22	Žalgiris	5-0	Jonava	Vilnius, Lithuania
20:00 EEST (UTC+3)	Klimavičius (yellow card) 6'; Šernas 8'; Ljujić 14' 22'; Atajić (yellow card) 55'; Antal 59' (pen.) 72'	Report	Osipovs (yellow card) 50'; Zhevnerov (yellow card) 59'	Stadium: LFF Stadium; Attendance: 600; Referee: (Lithuania) Manfredas Lukjančukas

22 August 2017 23	Stumbras	1-1	Žalgiris	Kaunas, Lithuania
18:00 EEST (UTC+3)	Marcos Junior (yellow card) 29'; Tomas Snapkauskas (yellow card) 36'; Lukas Artimavičius 48'; Lucas Villela (yellow card) 77'; Levan Macharashvili (yellow card) 85'	Report	Oyarzún (yellow card) 55'; Lukša 67'	Stadium: Darius and Girėnas Stadium; Attendance: 150; Referee: (Lithuania) Edmundas Gaigalas

14 September 2017 24	Žalgiris	v	Kauno Žalgiris	Vilnius, Lithuania
20:00 EEST (UTC+3)				Stadium: LFF Stadium

=== LFF Taurė ===
27 May 2017 Round of 32	Banga	1–1 (a.e.t.) (1–3 p)	Žalgiris	Gargždai, Lithuania
19:00 EEST (UTC+3)	Mindaugas Bitinas (yellow card) 25'; Karolis Urbaitis (yellow card) 36'; Mantas Gudauskas (penalty missed) 90+4' 90+4'; Simonas Urbys (red card) 94'; Ignas Jurgutis (yellow card) 99'; Deividas Padaigis (yellow card) 115'	Report	Komnen Andrić (yellow card) 34'; Uzėla (yellow card) 38'; Matija Ljujić 43'; Justas Lasickas (yellow card) 47'	Stadium: Gargždai Stadium; Attendance: 1,000; Referee: Ugnius Veprauskas
	Penalties
	Algimantas Bačanskis (penalty missed); Šarūnas Skulskis (penalty missed); Mantas Gudauskas (penalty scored); Tadas Norbutas (penalty missed)		(penalty missed) Mantas Kuklys; (penalty scored) Darvydas Šernas; (penalty scored) Vytautas Lukša; (penalty scored) Egidijus Vaitkūnas

24 June 2017 Round of 16	Žalgiris	1–0	Atlantas	Vilnius, Lithuania
17:00 EEST (UTC+3)	Elivelto 30'	Report	Donatas Kazlauskas (yellow card) 66'	Stadium: LFF Stadium; Attendance: 300; Referee: Jurij Paškovskij

26 August 2017 Quarter-finals	Panerys	0-8	Žalgiris	Vilnius, Lithuania
18:00	Tomas Statkevičius (yellow card) 26'	Report	Oyarzún 21'; Uzėla 49' 86'; Lukša 67' 90+1'; Ernestas Stočkūnas 75' 89'; Šernas 79'	Stadium: LFF Stadium; Attendance: 450; Referee: (Lithuania) Donatas Šimėnas

8 September 2017 Semi-finals	Sūduva	2-2 (a.e.t.) (2- 4 p)	Žalgiris	Marijampolė, Lithuania
15:00	Chvedukas 14'; Paulius Janušauskas (red card) 44'; Kardum (yellow card) 45+1'; Jankauskas (yellow card) 66' (goal) 120+1'; Švrljuga (yellow card) 72'	Report	Lukša (yellow card) 9'; Vaitkūnas (yellow card) 65' (goal) 90+3'; Elivelto (yellow card) 77'; Antal 94'; Kuklys (yellow card) 111'; Blagojević (yellow card) 112'; Vitkauskas (yellow card) 117'; Šernas (yellow card) 118'; Mbodj (yellow card) 120+3'	Stadium: ARVI Football Arena; Attendance: 1,000; Referee: (Lithuania) Donatas Rumšas

=== UEFA Champions League ===
==== Second qualifying round ====
12 July 2017 First leg	Žalgiris (Lithuania)	2–1	(Bulgaria) Ludogorets Razgrad	Vilnius, Lithuania
20:45 EEST (UTC+3)	Slavko Blagojević (yellow card) 8'; Matija Ljujić (yellow card) 62'; Darvydas Šernas (yellow card) 64' (yellow card) 90+4' (red card); Serge Nyuiadzi 78'; Mantas Kuklys 85'	Report	Anicet Abel 18'; Gustavo Campanharo (yellow card) 29'; Lucas Sasha (yellow card) 87'	Stadium: LFF Stadium; Attendance: 4911; Referee: Manuel Schuettengruber

19 July 2017 Second leg	Ludogorets Razgrad (Bulgaria)	4–1 (5–3 agg.)	(Lithuania) Žalgiris	Razgrad, Bulgaria
21:00 EEST (UTC+3)	Natanael 41' (yellow card) 70'; Cosmin Moti (yellow card) 45'; Wanderson 55'; Claudiu Keșerü 56' 74' (yellow card) 75'; Svetoslav Dyakov (yellow card) 76'	Report	Egidijus Vaitkūnas (yellow card) 9'; Serge Nyuiadzi 15'; Slavko Blagojević (yellow card) 56'; Donovan Slijngard (yellow card) 61'	Stadium: Ludogorets Arena; Attendance: 4739; Referee: Mads Kristoffersen

== Statistics ==
=== Appearances and goals ===
No.	Pos	Nat	Player	Total		A Lyga		Supercup		LFF Taurė		Champions League	
No.	Pos	Nat	Player	Apps	Goals	Apps	Goals	Apps	Goals	Apps	Goals	Apps	Goals
Goalkeepers
1	GK	(Lithuania) LTU	Armantas Vitkauskas	13	0	8	0	1	0	2	0	2	0
29	GK	(Lithuania) LTU	Džiugas Bartkus	2	0	2	0	0	0	0	0	0	0
30	GK	(Lithuania) LTU	Airidas Mickevičius	1	0	0+1	0	0	0	0	0	0	0
35	GK	(Lithuania) LTU	Pijus Petkevičius	1	0	0+1	0	0	0	0	0	0	0
Defenders
2	DF	(Lithuania) LTU	Linas Klimavičius	18	1	12+1	1	1	0	2	0	2	0
4	DF	(Chile) CHI	Diego Oyarzún	3	0	2	0	0	0	0	0	0+1	0
5	DF	(Netherlands) NED	Donovan Slijngard	21	0	15+1	0	1	0	1+1	0	2	0
6	DF	(Senegal) SEN	Mamadou Mbodj	20	0	15+1	0	1	0	1	0	2	0
8	DF	(Lithuania) LTU	Egidijus Vaitkūnas	19	0	11+3	0	1	0	2	0	2	0
23	DF	(Lithuania) LTU	Rolandas Baravykas	12	0	10+1	0	0	0	1	0	0	0
71	DF	(Lithuania) LTU	Jonas Skinderis	0	0	0	0	0	0	0	0	0	0
Midfielders
7	MF	(Croatia) CRO	Slavko Blagojević	20	1	14+2	1	1	0	1	0	2	0
13	MF	(Lithuania) LTU	Saulius Mikoliūnas	11	0	2+6	0	0+1	0	0+2	0	0	0
14	MF	(Lithuania) LTU	Karolis Uzėla	2	0	0+1	0	0	0	1	0	0	0
16	MF	(Mali) MLI	Mahamane Traoré	7	1	2+2	0	0+1	1	1	0	0+1	0
17	MF	(Romania) ROU	Liviu Antal	2	0	0	0	0	0	0+1	0	1	0
19	MF	(Lithuania) LTU	Daniel Romanovskij	2	0	2	0	0	0	0	0	0	0
21	MF	(Lithuania) LTU	Vytautas Lukša	21	1	11+5	1	1	0	0+2	0	0+2	0
22	MF	(Lithuania) LTU	Justas Lasickas	4	1	0+4	0	0	1	0	0	0	0
27	MF	(Serbia) SRB	Matija Ljujić	20	1	11+4	0	1	0	2	1	2	0
44	MF	(Togo) TOG	Serge Nyuiadzi	16	3	6+6	1	0	0	1+1	0	1+1	2
75	MF	(Lithuania) LTU	Ernestas Stočkūnas	1	0	0+1	0	0	0	0	0	0	0
88	MF	(Lithuania) LTU	Mantas Kuklys	20	5	16	4	1	0	1	0	2	1
Forwards
9	FW	(Bosnia and Herzegovina) BIH	Bahrudin Atajić	18	3	7+6	3	0+1	0	1+1	0	0+2	0
10	FW	(Lithuania) LTU	Darvydas Šernas	20	10	14+2	10	1	0	1+1	0	1	0
28	FW	(Lithuania) LTU	Julius Momkus	0	0	0	0	0	0	0	0	0	0
80	FW	(Brazil) BRA	Elivelto	21	9	17	8	1	0	1	1	2	0
Players transferred out during the season
3	DF	(Lithuania) LTU	Georgas Freidgeimas	10	0	7+2	0	0	0	1	0	0	0
11	FW	(Serbia) SRB	Komnen Andrić	9	1	6+2	1	0	0	1	0	0	0
55	GK	(Lithuania) LTU	Saulius Klevinskas	9	0	8+1	0	0	0	0	0	0	0

Last updated: 1 July 2017
Source: Competitions

=== Goalscorers ===
Rank	No.	Pos	Nat	Name	A Lyga	Supercup	LFF Taurė	UEFA CL	Total	
1	10	FW	(Lithuania)	Darvydas Šernas	10	0	0	0	10	
2	80	FW	(Brazil)	Elivelto	8	0	1	0	9	
3	88	MF	(Lithuania)	Mantas Kuklys	4	0	0	1	5	
4	9	FW	(Bosnia and Herzegovina)	Bahrudin Atajić	3	0	0	0	3	
4	44	MF	(Togo)	Serge Nyuiadzi	1	0	0	2	3	
5	2	DF	(Lithuania)	Linas Klimavičius	1	0	0	0	1	
5	7	MF	(Croatia)	Slavko Blagojević	1	0	0	0	1	
5	11	FW	(Serbia)	Komnen Andrić	1	0	0	0	1	
5	16	MF	(Mali)	Mahamane Traoré	0	1	0	0	1	
5	21	MF	(Lithuania)	Vytautas Lukša	1	0	0	0	1	
5	27	MF	(Serbia)	Matija Ljujić	0	0	1	0	1	
5	Own goal					1	0	0	0	1
Totals					29	1	2	0	32	

=== Clean sheets ===
Rank	No.	Pos	Nat	Name	A Lyga	Supercup	LFF Taurė	UEFA CL	Total
1	1	GK	(Lithuania)	Armantas Vitkauskas	5	1	1	0	7
2	55	GK	(Lithuania)	Saulius Klevinskas	4	0	0	0	4
3	30	GK	(Lithuania)	Airidas Mickevičius	1	0	0	0	1
3	29	GK	(Lithuania)	Džiugas Bartkus	1	0	0	0	1
Totals					10	1	1	0	12

=== Disciplinary record ===
No.	Pos	Nat	Player	A Lyga			Supercup			LFF Taurė			UEFA CL			Total		
No.	Pos	Nat	Player	Yellow card	(yellow card) (yellow-red card)	Red card	Yellow card	(yellow card) (yellow-red card)	Red card	Yellow card	(yellow card) (yellow-red card)	Red card	Yellow card	(yellow card) (yellow-red card)	Red card	Yellow card	(yellow card) (yellow-red card)	Red card
1	GK	(Lithuania)	Armantas Vitkauskas			1										0	0	1
2	DF	(Lithuania)	Linas Klimavičius	1												1	0	0
3	DF	(Lithuania)	Georgas Freidgeimas	3												3	0	0
5	DF	(Netherlands)	Donovan Slijngard	1									1			2	0	0
6	DF	(Senegal)	Mamadou Mbodj	5												5	0	0
7	MF	(Croatia)	Slavko Blagojević	5									2			7	0	0
8	DF	(Lithuania)	Egidijus Vaitkūnas	5									1			6	0	0
9	FW	(Bosnia and Herzegovina)	Bahrudin Atajić										1			1	0	0
10	FW	(Lithuania)	Darvydas Šernas	3									1	1		5	1	0
11	FW	(Serbia)	Komnen Andrić	1						1						2	0	0
13	MF	(Lithuania)	Saulius Mikoliūnas	2												2	0	0
14	MF	(Lithuania)	Karolis Uzėla							1						1	0	0
16	MF	(Mali)	Mahamane Traore		1											1	0	0
21	MF	(Lithuania)	Vytautas Lukša		1											1	0	0
22	MF	(Lithuania)	Justas Lasickas							1						1	0	0
23	DF	(Lithuania)	Rolandas Baravykas	1												1	0	0
27	MF	(Serbia)	Matija Ljujić	4									1			5	0	0
44	MF	(Togo)	Serge Nyuiadzi	1	1											1	1	0
80	FW	(Brazil)	Elivelto	1												1	0	0
88	MF	(Lithuania)	Mantas Kuklys	1												1	0	0
Totals				29	1	1	0	0	0	3	0	0	0	0	0	32	1	1
