= 2017 Lithuanian Football Cup =

LFF Taurė

Tournament details
- Country: Lithuania
- Dates: 27 April – 24 September
- Teams: 44

Final positions
- Champions: Stumbras
- Runners-up: Žalgiris
- Semifinalists: Sūduva; Vilniaus Vytis

Tournament statistics
- Matches played: 43
- Goals scored: 193 (4.49 per match)

The 2017 Lithuanian Football Cup, also known as LFF Cup, was the seventy-second season of the Lithuanian annual football knock-out tournament. Forty-four teams entered the competitions, which started on 27 April and ended on 24 September in Aukštaitija Stadium, Panevėžys.

Stumbras defeated defending champions Žalgiris 1–0 in the final and have qualified for the first qualifying round of the 2018–19 UEFA Europa League.

== Participants ==
Participation in the competition was mandatory for all clubs of the first three tiers (A Lyga, LFF I Lyga and II Lyga). Despite that two II Lyga sides - NFA and Šiauliai FA weren't competing. Teams of lower divisions were eligible to join if they met additional criterios. Rules prevented all reserve teams from entering the cup.

A Lyga	LFF I Lyga	II Lyga	III Lyga	IV Lyga	Other
Žalgiris (holders); Trakai; Sūduva; Atlantas; Stumbras; Jonava; Utenis; Kauno Žalgiris	Banga; Pakruojis; Palanga; Panevėžys; Nevėžis; Šilutė; Koralas; Džiugas; Tauras; Vilniaus Vytis; DFK Dainava	South Zone: Panerys; Hegelmann Litauen; TERA; Viltis; Sveikata; Šilas; West Zone: Babrungas; Širvėna; Gargždų Pramogos SC; Juventa-99; Akmenės Cementas; Atmosfera; Minija	Kaunas County: Kėdainiai; LŠS; Garliava; Prienai; Marijampolė County: Švyturys; Klaipėda County: Sendvaris; Šiauliai County: Saulininkas-OBLT; Adiada; Fanai	A Division: Elektrėnų Versmė; D Division: Geležinis Vilkas	Veterans League: Prelegentai

== Schedule ==
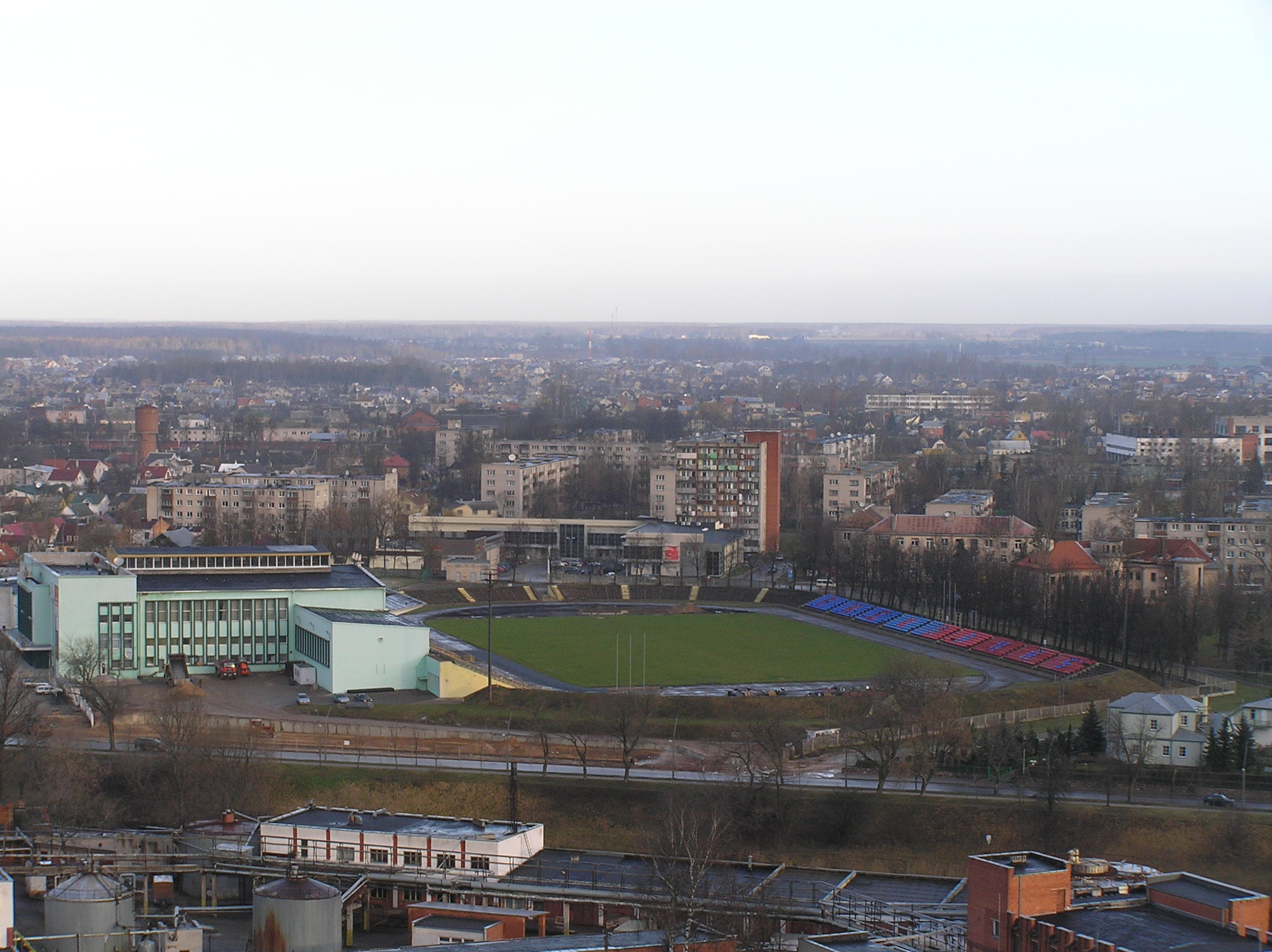
The Aukštaitija Stadium in Panevėžys hosted the final.

The rounds of the 2016–17 competition were scheduled as follows:

Round	Draw date and time	New entries	Clubs	Date(s)	Goals / games
First Round	18 April, 13:00	36	36 → 24	27 April–3 May	57 / 12
Round of 32	16 May, 13:00	8	32 → 16	25 May–4 June	65 / 16
Round of 16	30 May, 13:00	none	16 → 8	23–26 June	42 / 8
Quarter-finals	27 June, 13:00	none	8 → 4	26–27 August	22 / 4
Semi-finals	30 August, 11:30	none	4 → 2	9 September	6 / 2
Final	30 August, 11:30	none	2 → 1	24 September	1 / 1

== Matches ==
=== First round ===
The following pairs were drawn on 18 April 2017 by famous TV personality Paulius Ambrazevičius and all-time most capped Lithuanian national team player Andrius Skerla. Dates and venues were confirmed after the draw.

Džiugas, Šilutė, Tauras, Koralas (I Lyga), Hegelmann Litauen, TERA, Viltis, Panerys (II Lyga), Adiada, Kėdainiai, Saulininkas-OBLT (III Lyga) and Prelegentai (Veterans League) received free passes to the next round.

27 April 2017	Juventa-99 (3)	0–1	Panevėžys (2)	Šiauliai, Lithuania
19:00 EEST (UTC+3)		Report	Tomas Rakašius 75'	Stadium: Gytariai Stadium; Referee: Manfredas Lukjančukas

28 April 2017	Šilas (3)	0–5	Nevėžis (2)	Kėdainiai, Lithuania (Note: The match took place at the Nevėžis home stadium in Kėdainiai instead of Šilas home stadium.)
19:00 EEST (UTC+3)		Report	Šarūnas Činikas 24'; Kirill Shreitor 29'; Jonas Supronas 63', 84'; Tautvydas Amalas 73'	Stadium: Kėdainiai Stadium; Attendance: 23; Referee: Kęstutis Bartuškevičius

28 April 2017	Gargždų Pramogos SC (3)	0–4	Banga (2)	Gargždai, Lithuania
19:00 EEST (UTC+3)		Report	Simonas Urbys 46'; Karolis Urbaitis 50' (pen.); Šarūnas Skulskis 55'; Mikas Kura 83'	Stadium: Gargždai Stadium; Attendance: 400; Referee: Linas Gedvila

29 April 2017	Sendvaris (4)	0–2	Garliava (4)	Gargždai, Lithuania (Note: The match took place at the Gargždai Stadium in Gargždai instead of Sendvaris home stadium.)
13:00 EEST (UTC+3)		Report	Deividas Arlauskas 15'; Benas Kudirka 86'	Stadium: Gargždai Stadium; Attendance: 2 Referee: Orestas Abramavičius

29 April 2017	Širvėna (3)	2–3	Akmenės Cementas (3)	Biržai, Lithuania
13:00 EEST (UTC+3)	Simonas Laužikas; Mantas Gasiūnas	Report	Klaudijus Januitis; Valdas Rubel	Stadium: Biržai Stadium; Referee: Aurimas Strolė

29 April 2017	Pakruojis (2)	1–1 (a.e.t.) (3–4 p)	Vilniaus Vytis (2)	Pakruojis, Lithuania
14:00 EEST (UTC+3)	Mykola Barba 75'	Report	Mykolas Krasnovskis 40'	Stadium: Pakruojis Stadium; Attendance: 80; Referee: Mindaugas Jackus
	Penalties
	Donatas Strockis (penalty missed); Aivaras Bagočius (penalty scored); Vilius Lapeikis (penalty scored); Arūnas Šteinas (penalty scored); Aivaras Renusas (penalty missed)		(penalty scored) Arsenij Buinickij; (penalty missed) Leonardo Soares; (penalty scored) Tomas Misiūnas; (penalty scored) Lukas Miščiukas; (penalty scored) Nikolaj Misiuk

29 April 2017	Prienai (4)	2–5	Palanga (2)	Birštonas, Lithuania (Note: The match took place at the Birštonas Stadium in Birštonas instead of Prienai home stadium.)
15:00 EEST (UTC+3)	Robertas Ratkevičius 26', 55'	Report	Aurimas Jurgelevičius 40'; Iurie Cebotari 75'; Daniil Rubtsov 77', 90'; Haroldas Vaineikis 85'	Stadium: Birštonas Stadium; Attendance: 100; Referee: Šarūnas Tamulynas

29 April 2017	Minija (3)	0–1	Atmosfera (3)	Kretinga, Lithuania
16:00 EEST (UTC+3)		Report	Renatas Žebrauskas 82'	Stadium: Kretinga Stadium; Attendance: 170; Referee: Vladimir Gerasimov

29 April 2017	Fanai (4)	0–4	Sveikata (3)	Šiauliai, Lithuania
18:00 EEST (UTC+3)		Report	Vaidotas Norkeliūnas; Domas Ivanauskas; Artūras Pečiulis; Simonas Rekašius	Stadium: Gytariai Stadium; Referee: Mantas Lešinskas

29 April 2017	Elektrėnų Versmė (5)	8–0	LŠS (4)	Vilnius, Lithuania (Note: The match took place at the Senvagė Stadium in Vilnius instead of Elektrėnų Versmė home stadium.)
18:00 EEST (UTC+3)	Julius Dranginis 2' (pen.); Žygimantas Grinevičius 8', 51'; Tomas Čeliauskas 13'; Benas Buzevičius 27', 30'; Mindaugas Broga 35'	Report		Stadium: Senvagė Stadium; Referee: Artiom Gutovskij

1 May 2017	Geležinis Vilkas (5)	0–13	DFK Dainava (2)	Vilnius, Lithuania
19:00 EEST (UTC+3)		Report	Kyrylo Silich 14'; Sam Shaban 17', 20', 38', 53'; Lukas Baranauskas 68', 70', 79', 81'; Patrik Oiaran 74'; Titas Vitukynas 75', 77', 83'	Stadium: LFF Stadium; Referee: Robertas Valikonis

3 May 2017	Švyturys (4)	4–1	Babrungas (3)	Marijampolė, Lithuania
18:30 EEST (UTC+3)		Report		Stadium: ARVI Football Indoor Arena; Referee: Kęstutis Bartuškevičius

=== Round of 32 ===
The following pairs were drawn on 16 May 2017 by TV personality Paulius Ambrazevičius. Dates and venues were confirmed after the draw.

25 May 2017	Švyturys (4)	0–2	Trakai (1)	Marijampolė, Lithuania
18:00 EEST (UTC+3)		Report	Lajo Traore 85', 88'	Stadium: Marijampolė Sport Center Stadium; Attendance: 87; Referee: Saulius Dirda

26 May 2017	Akmenės Cementas (3)	1–3	Koralas (2)	Naujoji Akmenė, Lithuania
19:00 EEST (UTC+3)	Nedas Stankus 64'	Report	Valdas Rubel 50' (o.g.); Jonas Bičkus 52', 71'	Stadium: Naujoji Akmenė Stadium; Attendance: 110; Referee: Jurgita Mačikunytė

26 May 2017	Kėdainiai (4)	1–7	Vilniaus Vytis (2)	Kėdainiai, Lithuania
19:30 EEST (UTC+3)	Aivaras Gėgžna 66'	Report	Tomas Misiūnas 12'; Arsenij Buinickij 21'; Mykolas Krasnovskis 31', 55', 72'; Arminas Vaskela 42'; Romanas Juška 75'	Stadium: Kėdainiai Stadium second pitch Attendance: 70; Referee: Fiodoras Petrovas

27 May 2017	Panevėžys (2)	3–0	Kauno Žalgiris (1)	Panevėžys, Lithuania
13:00 EEST (UTC+3)	Mantas Savėnas 9'; Arnas Ribokas 49'; Charles Atsina 90+1'	Report		Stadium: Aukštaitija Stadium; Attendance: 150; Referee: Mindaugas Jackus

27 May 2017	Sveikata (3)	1–2	Jonava (1)	Kybartai, Lithuania
16:00 EEST (UTC+3)	Mindaugas Bičkovas 66'	Report	Tautvydas Eliošius 31' (pen.); Edgaras Makarovas 41'	Stadium: Kybartai Stadium; Attendance: 200; Referee: Kęstutis Bartuškevičius

27 May 2017	Garliava (4)	1–0	Atmosfera (3)	Kaunas, Lithuania
17:00 EEST (UTC+3)	Ignas Miliūnas 9' (pen.)	Report		Stadium: KTU Stadium; Attendance: 96; Referee: Arūnas Dapkus

27 May 2017	Šilutė (2)	0–1	Stumbras (1)	Šilutė, Lithuania
17:00 EEST (UTC+3)		Report	Fábio Lopes 16'	Stadium: Šilutė Stadium; Attendance: 120; Referee: Donatas Rumšas

27 May 2017	Adiada (4)	0–8	DFK Dainava (2)	Šiauliai, Lithuania
17:00 EEST (UTC+3)		Report		Stadium: Savivaldybė Stadium; Referee: Manfredas Lukjančukas

27 May 2017	Džiugas (2)	5–0	Tauras (2)	Telšiai, Lithuania
18:00 EEST (UTC+3)	Tomas Birškys 9'; Rolandas Leščius 35'; Marius Šluta 37', 90+1'; Andrius Lipskis 53'	Report		Stadium: TFA Stadium; Attendance: 150; Referee: Orestas Abramavičius

27 May 2017	Banga (2)	1–1 (a.e.t.) (1–3 p)	Žalgiris (1)	Gargždai, Lithuania
19:00 EEST (UTC+3)	Mantas Gudauskas 90+4'	Report	Matija Ljujić 43'	Stadium: Gargždai Stadium; Attendance: 1,000; Referee: Ugnius Veprauskas
	Penalties
	Algimantas Bačanskis (penalty missed); Šarūnas Skulskis (penalty missed); Mantas Gudauskas (penalty scored); Tadas Norbutas (penalty missed)		(penalty missed) Mantas Kuklys; (penalty scored) Darvydas Šernas; (penalty scored) Vytautas Lukša; (penalty scored) Egidijus Vaitkūnas

27 May 2017	Panerys (3)	2–1	Nevėžis (2)	Vilnius, Lithuania
20:00 EEST (UTC+3)	Benediktas Jakavičius 15'; Audrius Veikutis 31'	Report	Jonas Supronas 50'	Stadium: LFF Stadium; Attendance: 45; Referee: Vilius Paulauskas

28 May 2017	Palanga (2)	1–0	Utenis (1)	Palanga, Lithuania
18:30 EEST (UTC+3)	Gvidas Juška 9'	Report		Stadium: Palanga Stadium; Attendance: 250; Referee: Edmundas Gaigalas

28 May 2017	Hegelmann Litauen (3)	0–3	Sūduva (1)	Kaunas, Lithuania
19:00 EEST (UTC+3)		Report	Robertas Vėževičius 6', 32'; Markas Kardokas 44'	Stadium: NFA Stadium; Attendance: 100; Referee: Šarūnas Tamulynas

28 May 2017	Viltis (3)	1–13	Atlantas (1)	Vilnius, Lithuania
19:30 EEST (UTC+3)	Vaidas Pajarskas 89'	Report	Yuriy Vereshchak 5', 19', 26'; Andrei Panyukov 13', 16', 22'; Linas Pilibaitis 34', 37'; Justas Raziūnas 38'; Andrei Ciofu 47', 62'; Sergei Obivalin 61', 82'	Stadium: LFF Stadium; Attendance: 250; Referee: Jurij Paškovskij

29 May 2017	Prelegentai (Vet)	2–0	TERA (3)	Vilnius, Lithuania
21:00 EEST (UTC+3)	Edgaras Jankauskas	Report		Stadium: LFF Stadium; Attendance: 100; Referee: Donatas Šimėnas

4 June 2017	Elektrėnų Versmė (5)	4–1 (a.e.t.)	Saulininkas-OBLT (4)	Elektrėnai, Lithuania
14:00 EEST (UTC+3)	Vytautas Zemleckas 40'; Audrius Plytnikas 102'; Deividas Marcinkevičius 115'; Mindaugas Broga 118'	Report	24'	Stadium: Elektrėnai Stadium; Referee: Artiom Gutovskij

=== Round of 16 ===
The following pairs were drawn on 30 May 2017. Dates and venues were confirmed after the draw.

23 June 2017	Koralas (2)	0–4	Sūduva (1)	Klaipėda, Lithuania
19:00 EEST (UTC+3)		Report	Sergej Amirzian 14'; Giedrius Matulevičius 77', 82'; Robertas Vėževičius 90'	Stadium: Klaipėda Artificial Football Pitch; Attendance: 140; Referee: Vijūnas Vasiliauskas

23 June 2017	Panerys (3)	3–2 (a.e.t.)	Palanga (2)	Vilnius, Lithuania
20:00 EEST (UTC+3)	Aurimas Tamaliūnas 3'; Ramūnas Radavičius 72'; Tadas Gražiūnas 120'	Report	Aurimas Jurgelevičius 25'; Ričardas Šveikauskas 65'	Stadium: Senvagė Stadium; Attendance: 60; Referee: Darius Petraška

24 June 2017	Panevėžys (2)	2–1	Džiugas (2)	Panevėžys, Lithuania
14:00 EEST (UTC+3)	Eduard Grygorenko 20'; Ronaldas Misiūnas 88'	Report	Vitaliy Polyanskyi 79'	Stadium: Aukštaitija Stadium; Attendance: 200; Referee: Mindaugas Jackus

24 June 2017	Elektrėnų Versmė (5)	0–4	Jonava (1)	Elektrėnai, Lithuania
15:00 EEST (UTC+3)		Report	Laurynas Stonkus 42'; Tautvydas Eliošius 70', 80'; Maksym Marusych 89' (pen.)	Stadium: Elektrėnai Stadium; Attendance: 100; Referee: Kęstutis Bartuškevičius

24 June 2017	Žalgiris (1)	1–0	Atlantas (1)	Vilnius, Lithuania
17:00 EEST (UTC+3)	Elivelto 30'	Report		Stadium: LFF Stadium; Attendance: 300; Referee: Jurij Paškovskij

25 June 2017	Garliava (4)	0–8	Trakai (1)	Kaunas, Lithuania
18:30 EEST (UTC+3)		Report	Maksimov 7', 24'; Vaidotas Šilėnas 26'; Mykhailo Shyshka 33'; Oscar Dorley 38'; Justinas Januševskij 79'; Deividas Česnauskis 85'; Lajo Traore 90'	Stadium: KTU Stadium; Attendance: 150; Referee: Šarūnas Tamulynas

26 June 2017	DFK Dainava (2)	3–6	Vilniaus Vytis (2)	Alytus, Lithuania
19:00 EEST (UTC+3)	Kyrylo Silich 3'; Linas Savastas 33', 64' (pen.)	Report	Mykolas Krasnovskis 5', 51'; Leonardo Soares 19', 90+1'; Mantas Makutunovičius 23'; Ilya Tsyvilko 89' (o.g.)	Stadium: Alytus Stadium; Attendance: 500; Referee: Ugnius Veprauskas

26 June 2017	Prelegentai (Vet)	0–8	Stumbras (1)	Vilnius, Lithuania
20:00 EEST (UTC+3)		Report	Donatas Konikas 8', 24', 31'; Girius Kalvaitis 12' (o.g.); Lukas Artimavičius 17', 79'; Vilius Armalas 47'; Kgaogelo Sekgota 76'	Stadium: LFF Stadium; Attendance: 100; Referee: Donatas Šimėnas

=== Quarter-finals ===
The following pairs were drawn on 27 June 2017 by Lithuania national team midfielder Vykintas Slivka. Dates and venues were confirmed after the draw.

26 August 2017	Panerys (3)	0–8	Žalgiris (1)	Vilnius, Lithuania
18:00 EEST (UTC+3)		Report	Diego Oyarzún 21'; Karolis Uzėla 49', 86'; Vytautas Lukša 67', 90+1'; Ernestas Stočkūnas 75', 89'; Darvydas Šernas 79'	Stadium: Senvagė Stadium; Attendance: 450; Referee: Donatas Šimėnas

27 August 2017	Panevėžys (2)	0–1	Vilniaus Vytis (2)	Panevėžys, Lithuania
16:00 EEST (UTC+3)		Report	Arminas Vaskela 41'	Stadium: Aukštaitija Stadium; Attendance: 250; Referee: Darius Petraška

27 August 2017	Jonava (1)	3–5 (a.e.t.)	Stumbras (1)	Jonava, Lithuania
17:00 EEST (UTC+3)	Tadas Eliošius 8', 109'; Maksym Marusych 39'	Report	Jaisen Clifford 88'; Lucas Villela 90+2', 113', 118'; Kgaogelo Sekgota 101'	Stadium: Central Stadium of Jonava; Attendance: 200; Referee: Robertas Valikonis

27 August 2017	Sūduva (1)	4–1	Trakai (1)	Marijampolė, Lithuania
19:30 EEST (UTC+3)	Karolis Laukžemis 5', 81'; Modestas Vorobjovas 17' (o.g.); Jérémy Manzorro 84'	Report	Arūnas Klimavičius 62' (pen.)	Stadium: ARVI Football Arena; Attendance: 600; Referee: Gediminas Mažeika

=== Semi-finals ===
The following pairs were drawn on 30 August 2017 by actor Andrius Bialobžeskis along with Lithuania national team players Emilijus Zubas and Linas Klimavičius. Dates and venues were confirmed after the draw.

9 September 2017	Sūduva (1)	2–2 (a.e.t.) (2–4 p)	Žalgiris (1)	Marijampolė, Lithuania
15:00 EEST (UTC+3)	Karolis Chvedukas 14'; Algis Jankauskas 120+1'	Report	Egidijus Vaitkūnas 90+3'; Liviu Antal 94'	Stadium: ARVI Football Arena; Attendance: 1,000; Referee: Donatas Rumšas
	Penalties
	Andro Švrljuga (penalty scored); Jérémy Manzorro (penalty missed); Ovidijus Verbickas (penalty scored); Semir Kerla (penalty missed)		(penalty scored) Darvydas Šernas; (penalty scored) Mantas Kuklys; (penalty scored) Liviu Antal; (penalty scored) Slavko Blagojević

9 September 2017	Vilniaus Vytis (2)	1–1 (a.e.t.) (2–4 p)	Stumbras (1)	Vilnius, Lithuania
18:00 EEST (UTC+3)	Mykolas Krasnovskis 64'	Report	Nazaré 76'	Stadium: LFF Stadium; Attendance: 350; Referee: Robertas Valikonis
	Penalties
	Mantas Makutunovičius (penalty scored); Marius Šoblinskas (penalty scored); Arminas Vaskela (penalty missed); Markas Kardokas (penalty missed)		(penalty scored) Armanavičius; (penalty scored) Lucas Villela; (penalty scored) Nazaré; (penalty missed) Levan Macharashvili; (penalty scored) Alexandre Kore

=== Final ===
The final match was played on Sunday 24 September 2017 at Aukštaitija Stadium in Panevėžys.

24 September 2017
16:00 EEST (UTC+3)

Žalgiris	0–1	Stumbras
	Summary	Nasro Bouchareb 84'

Aukštaitija Stadium, Panevėžys
Attendance: 1,478
Referee: Saulius Dirda

== See also ==
Leagues

- 2017 A Lyga
- 2017 LFF I Lyga

Cups

- 2017 Lithuanian Supercup
