= Daniel Romanovskij =

Lithuanian footballer

Personal information
- Date of birth: 19 June 1996 (age 30)
- Place of birth: Vilnius, Lithuania
- Height: 1.78 m (5 ft 10 in)
- Position: Midfielder

Team information
- Current team: Šiauliai
- Number: 13

Senior career*
| Years | Team | Apps | (Gls) |
| 2014–2016 | Žalgiris Vilnius | 13 | (0) |
| 2015–2016 | → Žalgiris II | 36 | (27) |
| 2016 | Utenis Utena | 13 | (2) |
| 2017 | Stumbras Kaunas | 16 | (3) |
| 2017 | → Stumbras II | 7 | (0) |
| 2017–2018 | Žalgiris Vilnius | 11 | (0) |
| 2018–2019 | Zemun | 4 | (0) |
| 2019 | Kauno Žalgiris | 27 | (3) |
| 2020–2021 | Olimpik Donetsk | 21 | (1) |
| 2021 | Banga | 13 | (1) |
| 2022–2023 | Šiauliai | 70 | (18) |
| 2024 | Dinamo Tbilisi | 9 | (1) |
| 2024– | Šiauliai | 74 | (11) |

International career^{‡}
| 2013 | Lithuania U17 | 2 | (0) |
| 2014–2015 | Lithuania U19 | 9 | (1) |
| 2017– | Lithuania U21 | 13 | (1) |
| 2018– | Lithuania | 12 | (0) |
- * Club domestic league appearances and goals as of 10 August 2026 ‡ National team caps and goals as of 27 March 2024

Daniel Romanovskij (born 19 June 1996) is a Lithuanian international footballer who plays as left or right winger for Šiauliai.

== Club career ==
Born in Lithuanian capital Vilnius, Romanovskij has played for FK Žalgiris, FK Žalgiris II, FK Utenis Utena, FC Stumbras and FC Stumbras II. Romanovskij has an impressive feature of being a footballer that in his first 3 years as senior, he won 3 consecutive doubles, championship and cup. Later, while playing with Stumbras, he won the 2017 Lithuanian Cup playing the final precisely against his former club.

In summer 2018 he moved abroad and signed a 3-year contract with Serbian club FK Zemun, a club where his compatriot and former teammate at Žalgiris, Justas Lasickas, had been playing on one-year loan a season earlier.

In 27 July he signed with lithuanian Banga.

== International career ==
Romanovskij represented Lithuania at U17, U19 and U21 levels.

He made his international debut for the Lithuanian A national team in 2018.

== Honours ==
Žalgiris

- A Lyga: 2014, 2015, 2016
- Lithuanian Cup: 2014, 2015, 2016
- Lithuanian Supercup: 2016

Stumbras

- Lithuanian Cup: 2017
