= Dominykas Barauskas =

Lithuanian footballer

Personal information
- Date of birth: 18 April 1997 (age 29)
- Place of birth: Vilnius, Lithuania
- Height: 1.88 m (6 ft 2 in)
- Position: Defender

Team information
- Current team: TransINVEST
- Number: 33

Youth career
- Vilniaus FM

Senior career*
| Years | Team | Apps | (Gls) |
| 2015–2018 | Žalgiris | 8 | (0) |
| 2017 | → Stumbras (loan) | 20 | (1) |
| 2019 | Sūduva | 3 | (0) |
| 2019–2022 | Riteriai | 65 | (4) |
| 2022–2023 | Stal Mielec | 8 | (0) |
| 2024–2025 | Górnik Łęczna | 23 | (0) |
| 2025– | TransINVEST | 34 | (1) |

International career
| 2013–2014 | Lithuania U17 | 5 | (0) |
| 2015 | Lithuania U18 | 5 | (1) |
| 2015 | Lithuania U19 | 6 | (0) |
| 2016–2018 | Lithuania U21 | 9 | (0) |
| 2021–2022 | Lithuania | 11 | (0) |
- * Club domestic league appearances and goals as of 25 August 2026 (UTC)

Dominykas Barauskas (born 18 April 1997) is a Lithuanian professional footballer who plays as a defender for TOPLYGA club TransINVEST.

== Club career ==
On 10 June 2022, Barauskas moved abroad for the first time in his career, joining Polish Ekstraklasa side Stal Mielec on a one-year contract with a one-year extension option. Six days later, he made his league debut in a 0–2 away win against Lech Poznań. He made seven more appearances, his last on 17 September 2022 in a 0–3 home loss to Widzew Łódź, before suffering a knee injury which kept him out of play for several months. He was released by Stal at the end of the season.

Barauskas continued his career in Poland, first undergoing trials at Resovia in January 2024 and Puszcza Niepołomice during the summer. On 9 July 2024, he joined I liga club Górnik Łęczna on a one-year deal, with an option for a further year. On 28 June 2025, he and Górnik agreed to part ways.

In August 2025, Barauskas joined I Lyga club TransINVEST.

== International career ==
He was first called up to the Lithuania national team in September 2020 for games against Kazakhstan and Albania, but did not play.

He made his debut on 2 September 2021 in a World Cup qualifier against the Northern Ireland that ended in a 1–4 home loss. He substituted Vaidas Slavickas in the 74th minute.

== Career statistics ==
=== International ===
Appearances and goals by national team and year
| National team | Year | Apps | Goals |
|---|---|---|---|
Lithuania
| Lithuania | 2021 | 5 | 0 |
| Lithuania | 2022 | 6 | 0 |
| Total | | 11 | 0 |

== Honours ==
Žalgiris

- A Lyga: 2015, 2016
- Lithuanian Cup: 2014–15, 2015–16, 2016

Stumbras

- Lithuanian Cup: 2017
