= Rodrigo Josviaki =

Brazilian footballer

Personal information
- Full name: Rodrigo Martins Josviaki
- Date of birth: 16 February 1995 (age 31)
- Place of birth: Ponta Grossa, Brazil
- Height: 1.95 m (6 ft 5 in)
- Position: Goalkeeper

Team information
- Current team: Andraus

Youth career
- –2015: Coritiba

Senior career*
Years	Team	Apps	(Gls)
2016	Tupi	0	(0)
2016	Operário Ferroviário	0	(0)
2017–2019	Stumbras	74	(0)
2019–2020	Vilafranquense	10	(0)
2021	Remo	1	(0)
2022–2023	Hegelmann	14	(0)
2024–	Andraus	0	(0)
- * Club domestic league appearances and goals as of 19 September 2023

Rodrigo Martins Josviaki (born 16 February 1995), or simply Rodrigo Josviaki, is a Brazilian professional footballer who plays as a goalkeeper for Andraus.

== Honours ==
Stumbras

- Lithuanian Football Cup: 2017

Remo

- Copa Verde: 2021
