= Djibril Diaw =

Senegalese footballer

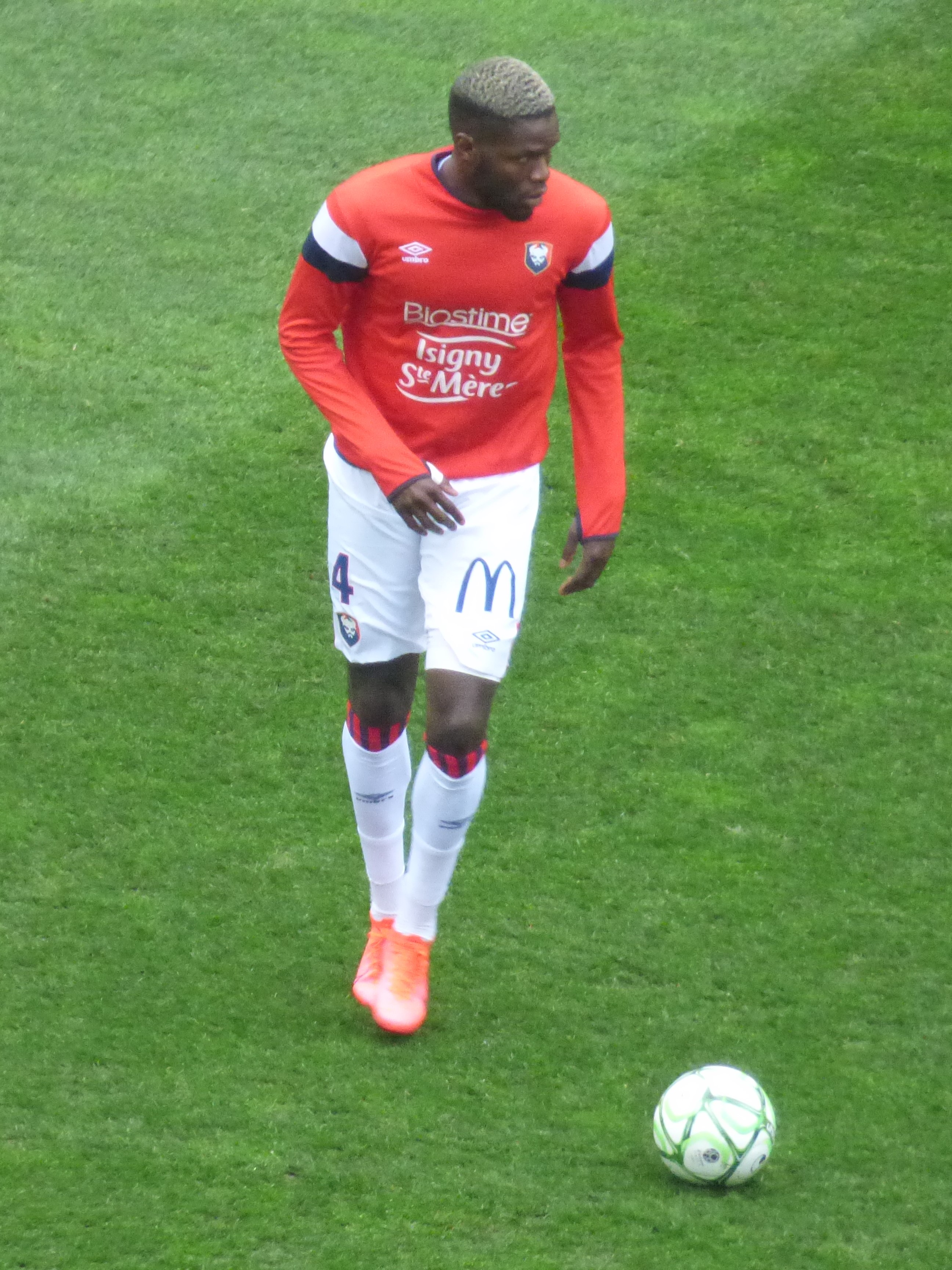
- Draw with Caen in 2020

Personal information
- Full name: Elhadji Pape Djibril Diaw
- Date of birth: 31 December 1994 (age 31)
- Place of birth: Dakar, Senegal
- Height: 1.95 m (6 ft 5 in)
- Position: Centre-back

Team information
- Current team: Botoșani
- Number: 23

Youth career
- ASC Bastos
- –2011: Wallidann Derklé

Senior career*
Years	Team	Apps	(Gls)
2011–2012	Jeanne d'Arc	12	(3)
2012–2014	Yeggo	32	(0)
2014–2015	Port Autonome	29	(0)
2015–2016	Geel	3	(0)
2016–2019	Korona Kielce	68	(4)
2019	Angers B	3	(0)
2019–2021	Angers	1	(0)
2019–2020	→ Caen (loan)	5	(0)
2019–2020	→ Caen B (loan)	6	(0)
2021–2022	Žalgiris	25	(2)
2022–2024	Rukh Lviv	0	(0)
2022	→ Arka Gdynia (loan)	6	(0)
2022–2024	→ Laval (loan)	46	(6)
2024–2025	Bordeaux	9	(0)
2025–	Botoșani	29	(1)

International career
2014–2016	Senegal Olympic	1	(0)
2019	Senegal	1	(0)
- * Club domestic league appearances and goals as of 1 November 2026

Elhadji Pape Djibril Diaw (born 31 December 1994) is a Senegalese professional footballer who plays as a centre-back for Liga I club Botoșani.

== Club career ==
After four years in Senegal, Diaw went through Geel and Korona Kielce before signing a two-year contract with Angers in January 2019.

On 27 June 2019, he was loaned one season-long to Ligue 2 club Caen.

On 22 February 2021, he signed for Lithuanian champions Žalgiris. He left the club on 23 January 2022.

Shortly after, Diaw signed with Ukrainian side Rukh Lviv. After the Russian invasion of Ukraine, his contract was suspended under new FIFA rules, which allowed players to sign with clubs outside Ukraine until 30 June 2022. On 21 March 2022, he returned to Poland, signing a short-term deal with I liga club Arka Gdynia.

On 20 June 2022, he was loaned to French Ligue 2 side Laval.

== International career ==
Diaw made his debut for the Senegal national team on 26 March 2019 in a friendly against Mali, as a starter.

== Honours ==
Žalgiris

- A Lyga: 2021
- Lithuanian Cup: 2021; runner-up 2021
