= FK Garliava =

Lithuanian football club

- Full name: Futbolo klubas "Garliava"
- Nicknames: FKG; garliaviškiai
- Founded: January 2008; 18 years ago
- Ground: Stadium of the school of Adomas Mitkus
- Capacity: 500
- Chairman: Henrikas Grigas
- Manager: Marius Bezykornovas
- League: I Lyga
- 2026: I Lyga, 10th of 16
- Website: fkgarliava.lt
Home colours	Away colours

Futbolo klubas Garliava, commonly known as Garliava, is a Lithuanian football club based in Garliava. They play in the II Lyga, the third tier of Lithuanian football.

== History ==
The club was founded in early 2008, initially focusing on training 25 children. They debuted in the Lithuanian Football Cup tournament during the 2017 season.

=== 2021 season ===
In 2021, the club was licensed to compete in the I Lyga but was subsequently relegated to the II Lyga. In the tournament's first stage, they competed in the winners' group, advancing to the second round to contend for top positions. They finished fourth overall, earning a spot in the promotional playoffs.

In the playoffs, they defeated Sūduva B with an aggregate score of 10–0, winning 9–0 in the first leg and 1–0 in the second. This secured their place in the 2022 II Lyga.

== Honours ==
=== Domestic ===
- (Lithuania) II Lyga

4th place: 2021

== Recent seasons ==
Season	Level	Division	Position	Web	Cup	Notes
2017	4.	Trečia lyga (Kaunas)	7.		Round of 16	
2021	3.	Antra lyga	4.		Quarter-finalist	▲ Promotion to 2022 Pirma lyga
2022	2.	Pirma lyga	12.		Round of 32	
2023	2.	Pirma lyga	8.			
2024	2.	Pirma lyga	15.			
2025	3.	Antra lyga	2.		Round of 16	▲ Promotion to 2026 Pirma lyga

== Kit evolution ==
Kit manufacturer

- (Spain) Joma (2021–)

2021	2021	2021	2021

=== Colors ===
- 2008 – now.

GARLIAVA	GARLIAVA

GARLIAVA	GARLIAVA

GARLIAVA	GARLIAVA

== Stadium ==
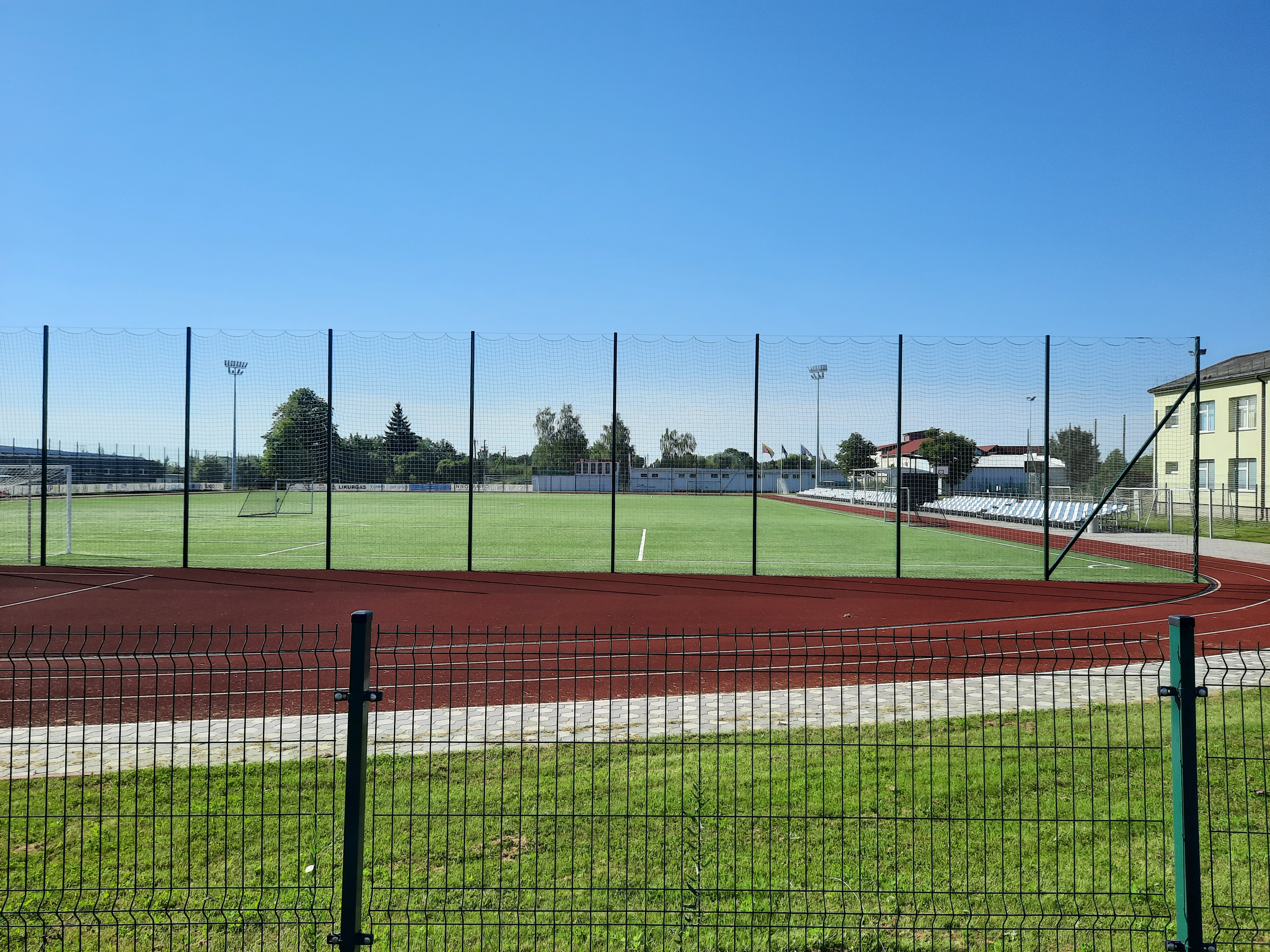
Garliava Stadium in 2022.

Club play their home matches in Stadium of the school of Adomas Mitkus (Adomo Mickaus mokyklos stadionas). The current capacity of the stadium is 500 seats.

== Current squad ==
As of 8 April, 2026

Note: Flags indicate national team as defined under FIFA eligibility rules; some limited exceptions apply. Players may hold more than one non-FIFA nationality.

No.	Pos.	Nation	Player
1	GK	LTU	Dominykas Valeckas
2	DF	CHI	Martin Genskowski
3	DF	LTU	Lukas Pilionis
4	DF	LTU	Motiejus Simonaitis
5	DF	LTU	Tomas Rakasius
6	MF	LTU	Simas Gedžiūnas
8	MF	LTU	Nojus Akinis
9	MF	LTU	Airimas Pilipavičius
11	DF	LTU	Lukas Odincovas
12	GK	LTU	Martynas Ražanauskas

No.	Pos.	Nation	Player
13	FW	BEN	Smith Dohemeto
14	MF	KOR	Chang Taeu
17	DF	LTU	Džiugas Čečkauskas
18	FW	LTU	Titas Pranauskas
19	MF	LTU	Matas Kvedarauskas
23	MF	LTU	Majus Sicinskis
25	MF	LTU	Ignas Ambrazevičius
26	FW	CHI	Martín del Campo
31	MF	LTU	Justas Paštukas
77	MF	LTU	Pijus Sudakovas

== Notable and famous players ==
FK Garliava players who have either appeared for their respective national team at any time or received an individual award while at the club.

Lithuania

- (Lithuania)
