= 2021 Lithuanian Football Cup =

Tournament details
- Country: Lithuania
- Teams: 30

Final positions
- Champions: Žalgiris
- Runners-up: Panevėžys

Tournament statistics
- Matches played: 29
- Goals scored: 98 (3.38 per match)

The 2021 Lithuanian Football Cup was a single elimination association football tournament which began on 22 May 2021 and ended on 23 October 2021. The winner of the competition earned a spot in the second qualifying round of the 2022–23 UEFA Europa Conference League.

Teams from A lyga, LFF I lyga and LFF II lyga participated in the tournament this year. Same as last year, lower league teams were not invited in order to shorten the competition due to the ongoing COVID-19 pandemic. The "B" teams do not participate in the cup competition. The A lyga teams entered the tournament from the first round this year.

FK Panevėžys were the defending champions after winning the final in the previous season against FK Sūduva on penalties.

== First round ==
Fourteen first round matches were played on 22–25 May 2021. Two random teams received a "bye" to the second round.

Team 1	Score	Team 2
Utenis	0–3	FK Šilutė
Sveikata	1–3	Babrungas
Panerys Vilnius	1–2	FA Šiauliai
Fortūna Kaunas	0–4	Saned Joniškis
Minija	1–1 (a.e.t.) (4–5 p)	Dainava
BFA	0–2	Nevėžis
Atmosfera	0–3	Hegelmann Litauen
Viltis Vilnius	0–0 (a.e.t.) (3–4 p)	FK Garliava
Klaipėdos FM	0–6	Džiugas
Ekranas	2–5 (a.e.t.)	Neptūnas
Sūduva	1–0	Riteriai
FK Jonava	1–2	Panevėžys
Žalgiris	5–0	Banga
Ateitis	1–6	Šilas
FK Kauno Žalgiris	–	bye
Be1 NFA (II)	–	bye

== Second round ==
Eight second round matches were played on 15–23 June 2021.

Team 1	Score	Team 2
Dainava	0–3	Žalgiris
Be1 NFA	0–6	Džiugas
Panevėžys	2–2 (a.e.t.) (4–3 p)	Kauno Žalgiris
Šilas	0–4	Hegelmann Litauen
FK Garliava	2–1	FK Šilutė
Nevėžis	0–2	Sūduva
Saned Joniškis	1–3	FA Šiauliai
Neptūnas	1–1 (a.e.t.) (9–10 p)	Babrungas

== Quarter–finals ==
The quarter–final matches were played from 18 August to 22 September 2021.

Team 1	Score	Team 2
FK Garliava	0–2	Hegelmann Litauen
Sūduva	0–0 (a.e.t.) (5–6 p)	Žalgiris
Babrungas	0–0 (a.e.t.) (4–2 p)	FA Šiauliai
Džiugas	1–3	Panevėžys

== Semi–finals ==
The semi–final matches were played on 28–29 September 2021.

Team 1	Score	Team 2
Babrungas	1–3	Panevėžys
Žalgiris	4–0	Hegelmann Litauen

== Final ==
23 October 2021
18:00 EEST
FINAL

FK Žalgiris	5–1	FK Panevėžys
Francis Kyeremeh 5'; Elhadji Diaw 16'; Hugo Videmont 50'; Jakub Sylvestr 78'; Hugo Videmont 81'	Soccerway lietuvosfutbolas.lt lff.lt report	44' Justinas Januševskij; (red card) 45' Jorge Elias

Savivaldybė Stadium, Šiauliai
Attendance: 1,112
Referee: Jurij Paškovskij

FK Žalgiris	FK Panevėžys

== See also ==
- 2021 A Lyga
