= André Almeida (footballer, born 1995) =

Portuguese footballer

Personal information
- Full name: André Filipe Lopes Almeida
- Date of birth: 16 May 1995 (age 31)
- Place of birth: Massamá, Portugal
- Height: 1.91 m (6 ft 3 in)
- Position: Centre-back

Youth career
- 2004–2007: Sacavenense
- 2007–2013: Real Massamá
- 2013–2014: Belenenses

Senior career*
Years	Team	Apps	(Gls)
2014–2017	Belenenses	0	(0)
2014–2015	→ Oeiras (loan)	16	(1)
2015–2016	→ Oriental (loan)	42	(0)
2016–2017	→ Real Massamá (loan)	11	(2)
2017–2019	Stumbras	58	(2)
2019–2020	Real Massamá	22	(4)
2020–2022	Covilhã	62	(4)
2022–2025	Académico Viseu	83	(5)
- * Club domestic league appearances and goals as of 4 June 2025

André Filipe Lopes Almeida (born 16 May 1995) is a Portuguese professional footballer who plays as a central defender.

== Club career ==
Developed at C.F. Os Belenenses, Almeida was born in Massamá, Lisbon District, and was successively loaned to begin his senior career, starting at AD Oeiras in the regional leagues but moving straight to the Segunda Liga with Clube Oriental de Lisboa. He made his professional debut with the latter club on 25 February 2015, coming on as a 59th-minute substitute in a 3–0 home win against FC Porto B.

In the 2017 January transfer window, Almeida cut ties with Belenenses and signed with FC Stumbras in the Lithuanian A Lyga. In his first season, he won the domestic cup.

Almeida then went back to Portugal, joining hometown's Real S.C. in the Campeonato de Portugal. In summer 2020, he returned to the second division on a contract at S.C. Covilhã, where he went on to total 71 appearances and five goals.

On 15 June 2022, Almeida signed a two-year deal with Académico de Viseu F.C. also in the second tier. He quickly established himself as an important member of the squad, eventually becoming team captain and renewing his contract until June 2026.

On 12 April 2025, Almeida suffered a serious knee injury which sidelined him for several months. On 21 December, the 30-year-old severed his ties by mutual agreement.

== Match fixing scandal ==
On 26 May 2016, Almeida was arrested on suspicion of match fixing whilst at Oriental, which led to him being banned from playing professional football in Portugal.
