= Fábio Lopes (footballer, born 1993) =

Portuguese footballer

Personal information
- Full name: Fábio Miguel Rico Lopes
- Date of birth: 10 January 1993 (age 33)
- Place of birth: Lisbon, Portugal
- Height: 1.73 m (5 ft 8 in)
- Position: Midfielder

Youth career
- 2002–2003: Estoril
- 2003–2007: Sporting CP
- 2007–2009: Benfica
- 2009–2011: Betis
- 2011–2012: Nacional

Senior career*
| Years | Team | Apps | (Gls) |
| 2012–2013 | Tondela | 3 | (0) |
| 2013–2014 | Famalicão | 14 | (0) |
| 2014–2015 | Boavista | 0 | (0) |
| 2014 | → Farense (loan) | 1 | (0) |
| 2015 | → Salgueiros 08 (loan) | 13 | (0) |
| 2017–2018 | Stumbras | 29 | (3) |
| 2019–2020 | União Madeira | 11 | (3) |
| 2021 | Oleiros | 9 | (0) |
| 2022 | Sertanense | 15 | (0) |
| Total | | 95 | (6) |
- * Club domestic league appearances and goals

Fábio Miguel Rico Lopes (born 10 January 1993) is a Portuguese former professional footballer who played as a midfielder.

== Club career ==
Born in Lisbon, Lopes played youth football for a host of clubs, including Real Betis from Spain where he won the junior national championship. He made his senior debut with C.D. Tondela, his first game in the Segunda Liga taking place on 4 March 2013 when he came on as a late substitute in a 2–0 away loss against C.F. União.

Lopes signed with Primeira Liga team Boavista F.C. in June 2014. He never appeared in any competitive matches for them, being successively loaned to S.C. Farense and S.C. Salgueiros 08.

On 28 February 2017, after nearly two years of inactivity, Lopes joined FC Stumbras from the Lithuanian A Lyga. In his first season, he won the domestic cup.
