= 2025 Lithuanian Football Cup =

Tournament details
- Country: Lithuania
- Teams: 50

Final positions
- Champions: Panevėžys (2nd title)
- Runners-up: Hegelmann

Tournament statistics
- Matches played: 49
- Goals scored: 209 (4.27 per match)
- Top goal scorer: Ariagner Smith (11 goals)

The 2025 Lithuanian Football Cup, for sponsorship reasons from this season, was also called Lithuanian: FPRO LFF Taurė was a single elimination football tournament in Lithuania. The winners qualified for the 2026–27 UEFA Conference League first qualifying round on a sporting merit (subject to receiving an UEFA licence). Banga were the defending cup holders.

== Draw and match calendar ==
The format was the same, as a previous year. As before, the "B" teams do not participate in the cup competition. The A lyga teams entered the tournament from the second round. A total number of participants this year was 50: 10 A lyga clubs, 11 LFF I lyga clubs, 13 LFF II lyga clubs, 9 LFF III lyga clubs and 9 SFL clubs.

Round	Draw dates	Match dates	Teams	Participants
Round I	April 11	April 11–15	40	Clubs from I, II, III ir SFL leagues
Round of 32	April 17	April 29–May 7	32	18 Round I winners, 4 teams received a bye, and 10 A lyga teams
Round of 16	May 12	May 20-28	16	Round of 32 winners
Quarterfinals	June 19	August	8	Round of 16 winners

== Round 1 ==
Team 1	Score	Team 2
FK Nevėžis (1)	1:1, (a.e.t.) 3:1	BFA (1)
FK Cementininkas (2B)	4:0	FKS Ukmergė (2A)
FK Utenos Utenis (2B)	3:1	FK Širvėna (2A)
Vilnius FA (2B)	1:0	FK Šilutė (2A)
EDM Statyba-Sendvaris (3)	0:13	FK Tauras (1)
FK Nemunas (2B)	0:1	FK Jonava (1)
Klaipėdos FM (2A)	3:1	FK Viltis (2A)
FK Ave.Ko. (SFL A)	1:18	FK Ekranas (1)
FK Tera (3)	0:8	FK Atmosfera (1)
FC Narjanta (3)	0:3	AFK (3)
FM Fortūna (2B)	0:3	FK Babrungas (1)
FK Utenos Utena (SFL C)	0:2	FK Kazlų Rūda (3)
FK Delamode Euforija (SFL A)	0:3	FK Be1 (1)
FK Geležinis vilkas (SFL A)	1:5	FK Sveikata (2A)
VGTU Vilkai (3)	6:1	FK Venta (2B)
FK Dembava (2A)	1:3	FC Neptūnas (1)
FK Saned (2B)	0:6	FK Sirijus (2A)
FK Ataka (3)	0:3	FK Minija (1)
FK Garliava (2A)		bye
FK Trivartis (SFL C)		bye
FK Pempininkai (3)		bye
FK Transinvest (1)		bye

== Round of 32 ==
Team 1	Score	Team 2
FK Nevėžis (1)	1:2	FK Minija (1)
AFK (3)	4:2	FK Pempininkai (3)
FK Kazlų Rūda (3)	1:0	FK Be1 (1)
FK Atmosfera (1)	0:2	FK Banga (A)
DFK Dainava (A)	0:6	FK Žalgiris (A)
Vilnius FA (2B)	0:4	FK Sūduva (A)
Klaipėdos FM (2A)	2:2, (a.e.t.) 2:3	FK Jonava (1)
FK Sirijus (2A)	0:5	FK Transinvest (1)
FK Garliava (2A)	1:0	FK Ekranas (1)
VGTU Vilkai (3)	0:6	FC Hegelmann (A)
FK Utenos Utenis (2B)	1:5	FK Tauras (1)
FK Sveikata (2A)	0:2	FK Babrungas (1)
FC Neptūnas (1)	0:0, (a.e.t.) 0:1	FK Kauno Žalgiris (A)
FK Riteriai (A)	1:2	FA Šiauliai (A)
FK Trivartis (SFL C)	0:13	FK Panevėžys (A)
FK Cementininkas (2B)	2:3	FC Džiugas (A)

== Round of 16 ==
Team 1	Score	Team 2
FK Minija (1)	0:1	FC Džiugas (A)
FK Tauras (1)	1:3	FK Sūduva (A)
FK Transinvest (1)	0:1	FC Hegelmann (A)
AFK (3)	0:6	FK Babrungas (1)
FK Kazlų Rūda (3)	1:4	FK Jonava (1)
FK Žalgiris (A)	2:2, (a.e.t.) 2:4	FK Kauno Žalgiris (A)
FK Garliava (2A)	0:3	FK Panevėžys (A)
FK Banga (A)	0:1	FA Šiauliai (A)

== Quarterfinals ==
Team 1	Score	Team 2
FC Hegelmann (A)	3–1	FA Šiauliai (A)
FK Kauno Žalgiris (A)	0–2	FK Sūduva (A)
FK Babrungas (1)	1–2	FC Džiugas (A)
FK Jonava (1)	1–4	FK Panevėžys (A)

== Semi-finals ==
Team 1	Score	Team 2
September
FK Sūduva (A lyga)	0–2	FK Panevėžys (A lyga)
FC Džiugas (A lyga)	1–2	FC Hegelmann (A lyga)

== Final ==
28 September 2025
15:00

Panevėžys	1–0	Hegelmann
Smith 72'	Report

Central Stadium of Jonava, Jonava
Attendance: 1,463
Referee: Vilius Paulauskas
