= Gediminas Mažeika =

Lithuanian football referee

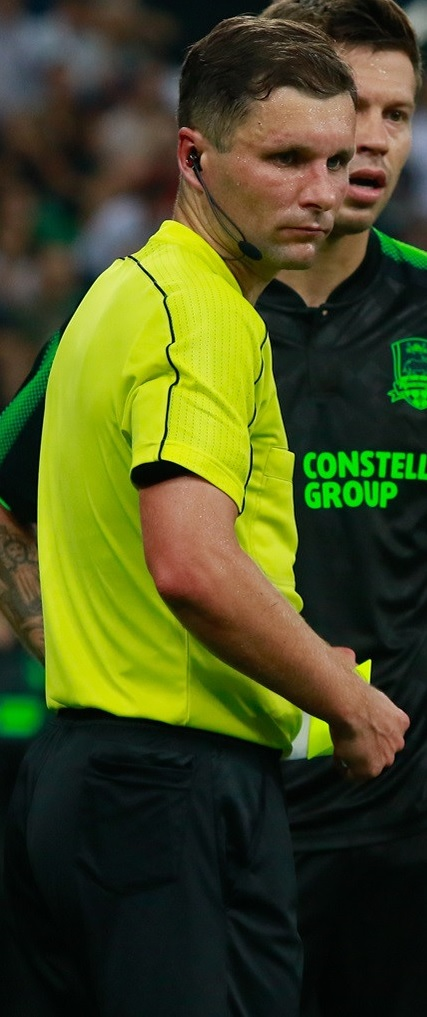
- Mažeika in 2017
- Born: 24 March 1978 (age 48); Kaunas, Lithuanian SSR, Soviet Union

Domestic
Years	League	Role
1999-	LFF I lyga	Referee
2000-	A Lyga	Referee

International
Years	League	Role
2008-;	FIFA listed	Referee

Gediminas Mažeika (born 24 March 1978 in Kaunas) is a Lithuanian former professional football referee. He is a FIFA referee,

Mažeika refereed one group stage match in the 2016–17 UEFA Champions League, between Bayer Leverkusen against Monaco in December 2016.

Mažeika retired from refereeing in October 2020, after being moved down from UEFA First Category. His last match officiated was between Nevėžis and Hegelmann Litauen on 2 October 2020.
