= Darvydas Šernas =

Lithuanian footballer

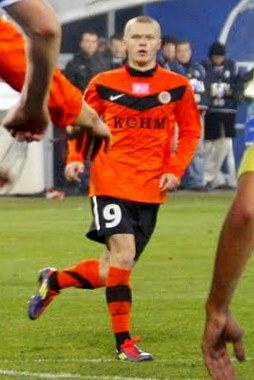
- Šernas playing for Zagłębie Lubin in 2011

Personal information
- Date of birth: 22 July 1984 (age 42)
- Place of birth: Alytus, Lithuanian SSR, Soviet Union
- Height: 1.80 m (5 ft 11 in)
- Position: Forward

Senior career*
Years	Team	Apps	(Gls)
2001–2002	Dainava Alytus		
2002–2008	Vėtra	134	(28)
2008	Spartak Nalchik	4	(0)
2009–2011	Widzew Łódź	67	(23)
2011–2013	Zagłębie Lubin	39	(5)
2013	→ Gaziantepspor (loan)	16	(6)
2013–2014	Gaziantepspor	3	(0)
2014	→ Perth Glory (loan)	10	(1)
2014	Wigry Suwałki	14	(2)
2015	Ross County	5	(0)
2015	Žalgiris	16	(17)
2016	Alanyaspor	4	(0)
2017	Žalgiris	29	(19)
2018	Hapoel Kfar Saba	16	(5)
2018	Sogdiana Jizzakh	17	(3)
2019	Atlantas Klaipėda	23	(6)

International career
2008–2018	Lithuania	47	(5)
- * Club domestic league appearances and goals

Darvydas Šernas (born 22 July 1984) is a Lithuanian former professional footballer who played as a forward. Šernas has played internationally for the Lithuania national team.

== Career ==
=== Club career ===
In July 2011, he signed a three-year contract with Zagłębie Lubin.

In January 2014, it was announced that Šernas would go to Perth Glory on loan. In his debut for Perth Glory against Melbourne Victory, Šernas scored his debut goal in the 50th minute, only 3 minutes after being substituted into the game. Šernas' goal tied the game at 1–1, and ended the scoring.

Šernas signed for Scottish Premiership club Ross County in 2015, but was released at the end of the 2014/15 season.

On 6 July 2015 it was announced that Šernas had joined Žalgiris Vilnius.

He returned to Žalgiris before 2017 season.

On 16 January 2018 signed to Hapoel Kfar Saba.

At the end of 2019, Šernas announced his retirement.

=== International career ===
Šernas won his first senior cap in a friendly match against Estonia on 31 May 2008.

==== International goals ====
As of match played 10 June 2017. Lithuania score listed first, score column indicates score after each Šernas goal.

International goals by date, venue, cap, opponent, score, result and competition
No.	Date	Venue	Cap	Opponent	Score	Result	Competition
1	11 February 2009	Municipal, Albufeira, Portugal	16	Andorra	2–0	3–1	International friendly
2	7 September 2010	Andrův stadion, Olomouc, Czech Republic	19	Czech Republic	1–0	1–0	UEFA Euro 2012 qualifying
3	8 October 2010	Helmántico Stadium, Villares de la Reina, Spain	20	Spain	1–1	1–3	UEFA Euro 2012 qualifying
4	11 October 2011	Darius and Girėnas Stadium, Kaunas, Lithuania	25	Czech Republic	1–3	1–4	UEFA Euro 2012 qualifying
5	22 March 2013	Štadión pod Dubňom, Žilina, Slovakia	32	Slovakia	1–0	1–1	2014 FIFA World Cup qualification

== Honours ==
Widzew Łódź

- I liga: 2008–09, 2009–10

Žalgiris

- A Lyga: 2015
- Lithuanian Cup: 2014–15
- Lithuanian Supercup: 2017

Individual

- A Lyga top scorer: 2017
