= 2014–15 Lithuanian Football Cup =

Tournament details
- Country: Lithuania
- Teams: 48

Final positions
- Champions: Žalgiris
- Runners-up: Atlantas

The 2014–15 Lithuanian Football Cup is the twenty-six season of the Lithuanian annual football knock-out tournament. The competition started on 15 June 2014 with the matches of the first round and is scheduled to end in May 2015. Žalgiris are the defending champions.

The winners will qualify for the first qualifying round of the 2015–16 UEFA Europa League.

== First round ==
The matches started on 15 June 2014 and ended on 2 August 2014.

Team 1	Score	Team 2
15 June
Eurostandartas (4)	4–1	Saulininkas (4)
16 June
Kupsc (4)	3–1	Sveikata-2 (4)
17 June
Fanai (4)	1–1 (4–5 p)	Džiugas (3)
18 June
Kuršiai (4)	1–3	Palanga (2)
24 June
Geležinis Vilkas (5)	0–5	Utenis (2)
26 June
Pressas (5)	0–5	Hegelmann Litauen (4)
Sarema (4)	1–3	Stumbras (2)
Mostiškės (5)	1–1 (4–2 p)	Trivartis (5)
29 June
Sakuona (4)	3–2	F.B.K. Kaunas (3)
10 July
Širvinta (4)	2–5	TAIP (4)
30 July
TEC (4)	1–2	Baltija (2)
Medelyno Bėgiai (4)	0–6	Šilutė (2)
1 August
Adiada (4)	0–5	Prelegentai (4)
2 August
Rokiškis (4)	2–7	MRU-Tiumenas (2)

== Second round ==
The matches started on 8 August 2014 and ended on 14 September 2014.

Team 1	Score	Team 2
8 August
Džiugas (3)	2–0	Palanga (2)
29 August
Mostiškės (5)	2–0	Kupsc (4)
Eurostandartas (4)	1–2	Hegelmann Litauen (4)
TAIP (4)	4–1	Viltis (4)
3 September
Utenis (2)	4–0	Baltija (2)
9 September
Gariūnai (3)	1–2	Šilutė (2)
10 September
MRU-Tiumenas (2)	3–2	Stumbras (2)
14 September
Prelegentai (4)	7–1	Sakuona (4)

== Third round ==
Team 1	Score	Team 2
23 September
Šilas (2)	3–2 (a.e.t.)	Trakai (1)
Utenis (2)	1–3	Spyris (2)
Nevėžis (2)	0–2	Klaipėdos Granitas (1)
TAIP (4)	2–0	Lokomotyvas (2)
Mostiškės (5)	1–0	Lietava (2)
Hegelmann Litauen (4)	2–1 (a.e.t.)	Tauras (2)
Prelegentai (4)	1–0	Džiugas (3)
24 September
Šilutė (2)	0–1	MRU-Tiumenas (2)

== Fourth round ==
Team 1	Score	Team 2
30 September
MRU-Tiumenas (2)	0–2	Sūduva (1)
Hegelmann Litauen (4)	0–3	Dainava (1)
1 October
Prelegentai (4)	1–0	Banga (1)
Žalgiris (1)	3–0	Ekranas (1)
Spyris (2)	0–0 (7–6 p)	Šiauliai (1)
Klaipėdos Granitas (1)	2–0	Kruoja (1)
TAIP (4)	1–3 (a.e.t.)	Atlantas (1)
3 October
Mostiškės (5)	0–4	Šilas (2)

== Quarter-finals ==
Team 1	Agg.	Team 2	1st leg	2nd leg
Prelegentai (4)	0–7	Spyris (2)	0–2	0–5
Šilas (2)	3–2	Dainava (1)	0–2	3–0 (a.e.t.)
Klaipėdos Granitas (1)	0–7	Atlantas (1)	0–4	0–3
Žalgiris (1)	4–2	Sūduva (1)	1–0	3–2

== Semi-finals ==
And. 20/04/15 Rit. 05/05/2015

Team 1	Agg.	Team 2	1st leg	2nd leg
Žalgiris (1)	6–0	Spyris (2)	4–0	2–0
Šilas (2)	0–7	Atlantas (1)	0–1	0–6

== Final ==
The final was played on 23 May 2015.

Team 1	Score	Team 2
Žalgiris	2–0	Atlantas
