= 2015–16 Lithuanian Football Cup =

Tournament details
- Country: Lithuania
- Teams: 62

Final positions
- Champions: Žalgiris
- Runners-up: Trakai

The 2015–16 Lithuanian Football Cup was the twenty-seventh season of the Lithuanian annual football knock-out tournament. The competition started on 2 June 2015 with the matches of the first round and ended in May 2016. Žalgiris are the defending champions.

The winners will qualify for the first qualifying round of the 2016–17 UEFA Europa League.

== First round ==
The matches started on 2 June 2015 and ended on 26 June 2015.

Team 1	Score	Team 2
2 June
Baltoji Vokė (5)	1–2	Tera-Griunvaldas (3)
9 June
TEC (4)	1–2	Sportidus (4)
11 June
Euforija (5)	2–3	Adiada (4)
Olimpija (4)	1–0	FM Ateitis (3)
12 June
Švyturys (4)	1–0	TAIP (3)
13 June
Eurostandartas (4)	3–2	Sakuona (4)
14 June
Geležinis Vilkas (5)	1–3	Sendvaris (4)
Koralas (4)	2–0	Viltis (3)
16 June
Narjanta (4)	1–5	Vidzgiris (3)
Elektrėnų Versmė (5)	1–2 (a.e.t.)	Kėdainiai (4)
Pramogos SC-Taškas (3)	2–1	Vulkanas (3)
FSK Anykščiai (4)	0–1	FSK Radviliškis (3)
21 June
Saulininkas (4)	3–3 (a.e.t.) (5–3 p)	Granitas (4)
26 June
Sarema (4)	0–2	Prelegentai (4)

== Second round ==
Team 1	Score	Team 2
11 July 2015
Adiada (4)	1–3	Švyturys (4)
12 July 2015
Olimpija (4)	2–0	Sendvaris (4)
17 July 2015
Sportidus (4)	1–7	Lokomotyvas (2)
22 July 2015
Koralas (4)	7–0	Dainava Alytus (3)
Saulininkas (4)	1–2	Auska (2)
23 July 2015
Kėdainiai (4)	3–2	Bekentas (3)
Juventa-99 (3)	2–6	Džiugas (2)
Visaginas (3)	2–2 (a.e.t.) (5–4 p)	Akmenė (3)
24 July 2015
Eurostandartas (4)	1–2	Pramogos SC-Taškas (3)
Panevėžys (2)	5–0	Kražantė Kelmė (2)
25 July 2015
FSK Radviliškis (3)	1–2	F.B.K. Kaunas (2)
Sveikata (3)	2–0	Širvėna (3)
SRC Vidzgiris (3)	0–2	Druskininkai (3)
30 July 2015
Gariūnai (3)	2–0	Tera-Griunvaldas (3)
3 August 2015
Prelegentai (4)	4–2 (a.e.t.)	Atmosfera (3)
5 August 2015
SFK Rotalis (3)	0–0 (a.e.t.) (0–3 p)	Šilutė (2)

== Third round ==
Team 1	Score	Team 2
23 August 2015
Olimpija (4)	2–2 (a.e.t.) (1-4 p)	Pramogos SC-Taškas (3)
25 August 2015
Auska (2)	1–2	Džiugas (2)
Švyturys (4)	0–2	F.B.K. Kaunas (2)
Kėdainiai (4)	1–6	Lokomotyvas (2)
Prelegentai (4)	5–3	Sveikata (3)
2 September 2015
Panevėžys (2)	3–1	Šilutė (2)
3 September 2015
Druskininkai (3)	–	Gariūnai (3)
5 September 2015
Koralas (4)	0–2	Visaginas (3)

== Fourth round ==
Team 1	Score	Team 2
22 September 2015
Tauras (2)	5–4 (a.e.t.)	MRU (2)
Džiugas (2)	7–1 (a.e.t.)	Nevėžis (2)
Šilas (2)	0–4	Lietava (2)
F.B.K. Kaunas (2)	0–3	Spyris (1)
Prelegentai (4)	3–1	Panevėžys (2)
Druskininkai (3)	–	Banga (2)
Pramogos SC-Taškas (3)	3–1	Visaginas (3)
Lokomotyvas (2)	2–3	Utenis (1)

== Round of 16 ==
Team 1	Score	Team 2
29 September 2015
Prelegentai (4)	0–8	Utenis (1)
Pramogos SC-Taškas (3)	1–4	Spyris (1)
Atlantas (1)	4–0	Šiauliai (1)
30 September 2015
Tauras (2)	2–12	Stumbras (1)
Lietava (2)	2–1 (a.e.t.)	Klaipėdos Granitas (1)
Džiugas (2)	0–2	Sūduva (1)
Banga (2)	1–4	Žalgiris (1)
Trakai (1)	w/o	Kruoja (1)

== Quarter-finals ==
Team 1	Agg.	Team 2	1st leg	2nd leg
Žalgiris (1)	12–2	Spyris (1)	5–0	7–2
Atlantas (1)	1–4	Trakai (1)	1–2	0–2
Sūduva (1)	6–0	Lietava (2)	3–0	3–0
Stumbras (1)	5–3	Utenis (1)	2–1	3–2

== Semi-finals ==
Team 1	Agg.	Team 2	1st leg	2nd leg
Žalgiris (1)	3–1	Stumbras (1)	1–1	2–0
Trakai (1)	3–0	Sūduva (1)	2–0	1–0

== Final ==
The final took place on 15 May 2016, in the new stadium that has been built in Telšiai.

Team 1	Score	Team 2
Trakai (1)	0–1 (a.e.t.)	Žalgiris (1)
