= Kėdainiai Stadium =

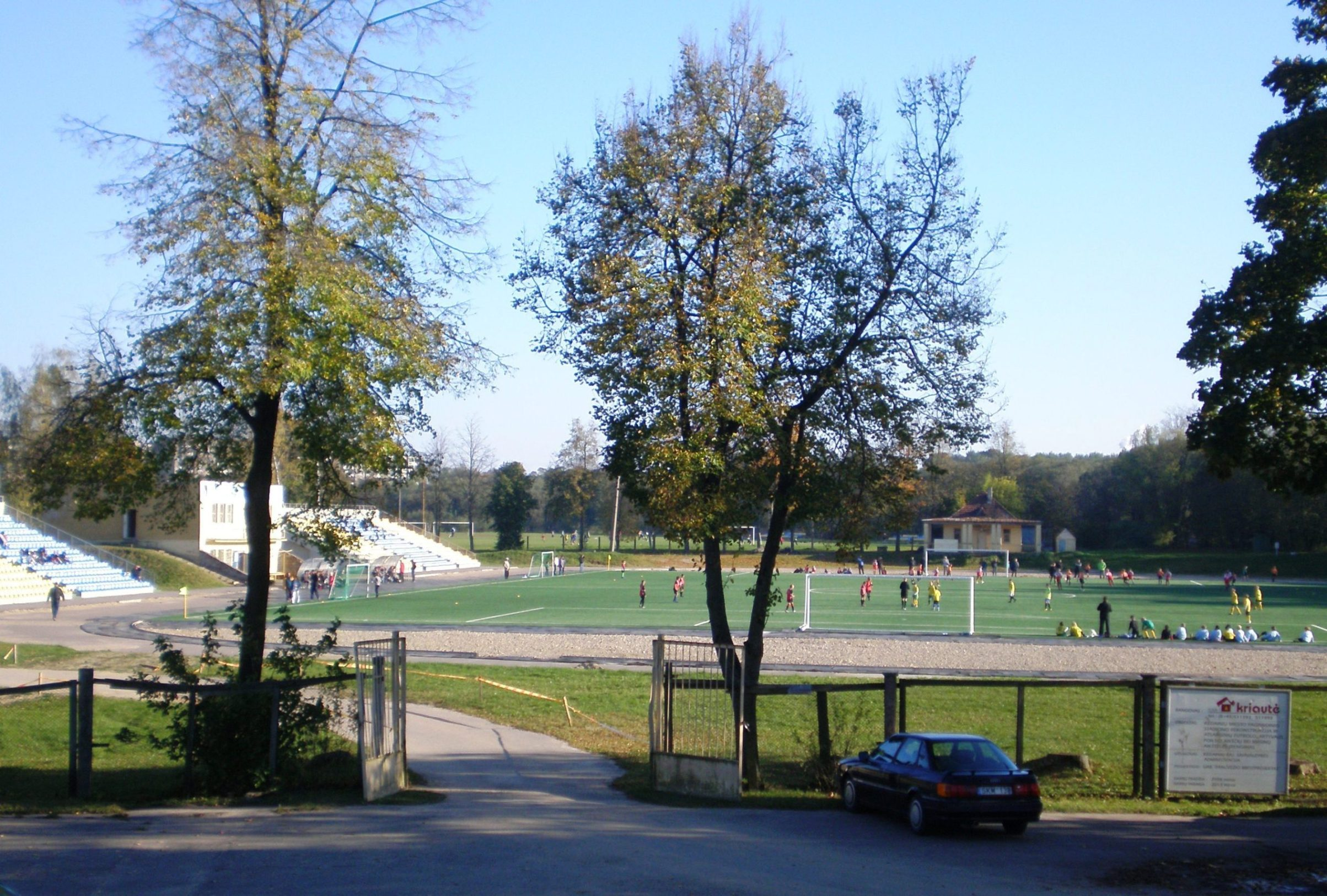
- Renovated Kėdainiai Stadium
- Interactive map of Kėdainiai Stadium
- Full name: Kėdainiai City Central Stadium
- Location: Kėdainiai, Lithuania
- Coordinates: 55°17′57″N 23°59′15″E
- Owner: Kedainiai district municipality
- Capacity: 3,000
- Surface: Desso Sport artificial turf

Construction
- Built: 1955
- Renovated: 2005-2017 (ongoing)

Tenants
- Nevėžis; Nevėžis B Nevėžis women's team Kėdainiai

Kedainiai Stadium is a multi-use stadium in Kėdainiai, Lithuania. It is currently used mostly for football matches and is the home stadium of FK Nevėžis. The stadium holds 3,000 people.
