= Jardel Nazaré =

São Toméan footballer

Personal information
- Full name: Jardel Rodrigues Afonso Nazaré
- Date of birth: 16 May 1995 (age 31)
- Place of birth: São Tomé, São Tomé and Príncipe
- Height: 1.79 m (5 ft 10 1/2 in)
- Positions: Left-back; left midfielder

Team information
- Current team: Saburtalo Tbilisi
- Number: 5

Youth career
- –2012: Corroios
- 2012–2013: Almada
- 2013–2014: Chaves

Senior career*
Years	Team	Apps	(Gls)
2014–2016	Naval 1º de Maio	51	(1)
2016–2018	Stumbras	59	(0)
2019	União da Madeira	9	(0)
2019	Oleiros	16	(2)
2020–	Saburtalo Tbilisi	0	(0)

International career^{‡}
2019–	São Tomé and Príncipe	3	(0)
- * Club domestic league appearances and goals as of 7 March 2020 ‡ National team caps and goals as of 13 November 2020

Jardel Rodrigues Afonso Nazaré (born 16 May 1995) is a São Toméan footballer who plays as a left-back for Georgian Erovnuli Liga club FC Saburtalo Tbilisi and the São Tomé and Príncipe national team. He also holds Portuguese citizenship.

== International career ==
Nazaré made his senior debut for São Tomé and Príncipe at the 2021 Africa Cup of Nations qualification on 13 November 2019, in a 0–4 loss to Sudan.
