= Aukštaitija Stadium =

Football stadium in Panevėžys, Lithuania

Coordinates: 55°44′21″N 24°21′34″E

Aukštaitijos stadionas
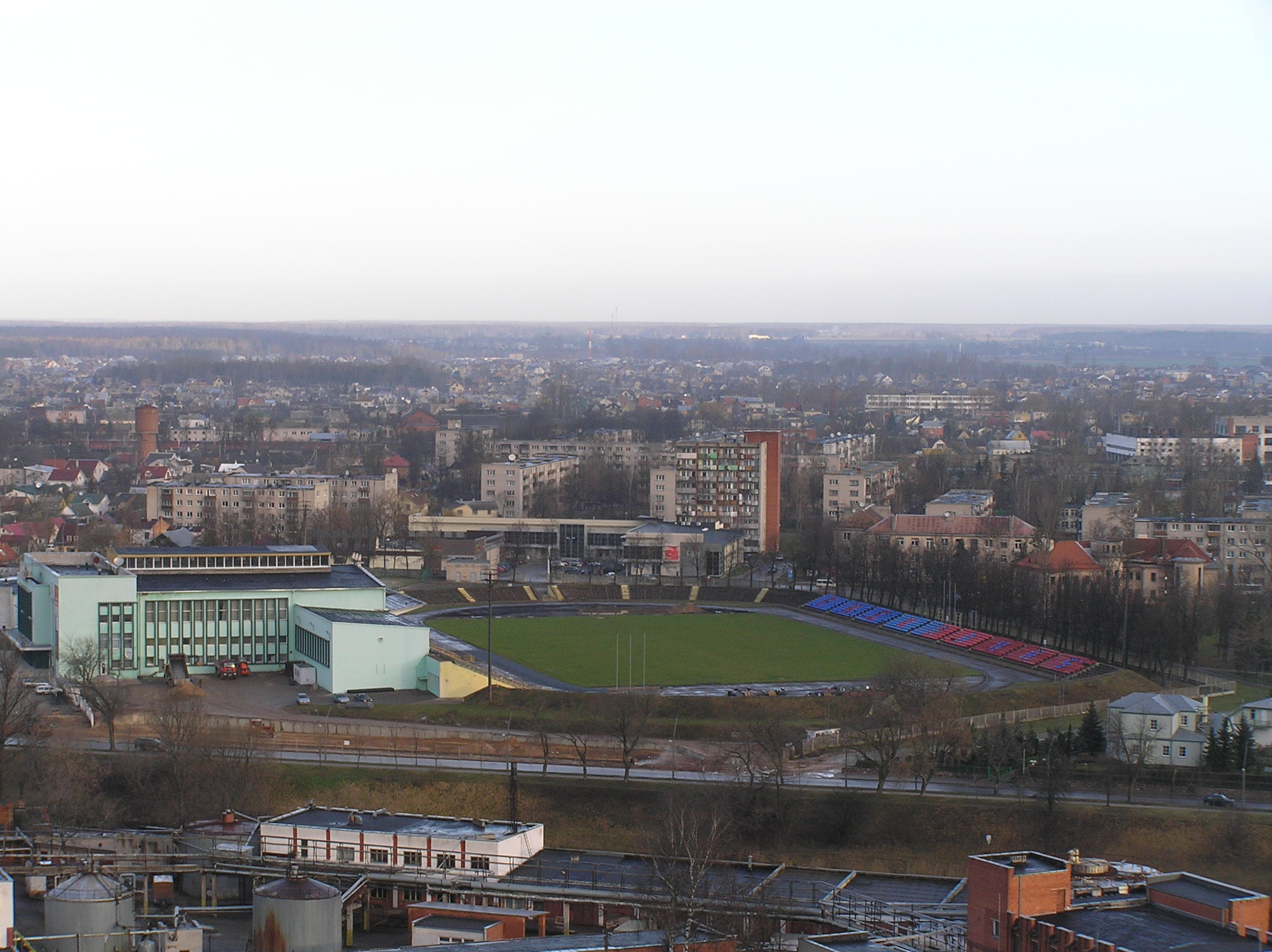
- UEFA Category 2 stadium
- Interactive map of Aukštaitijos stadionas
- Address: A. Jakšto g. 1
- Location: Panevėžys, Lithuania
- Owner: Panevėžys municipality, FK Panevėžys
- Capacity: 6,600
- Surface: Grass

Construction
- Opened: 1965
- Renovated: 2019

Tenants
- FK Statyba Panevėžys (1965 - 1977); FK Ekranas (1965 - 2014; 2020 -); FK Panevėžys (2015 - present)

Aukštaitija Stadium is a multi-purpose stadium in Panevėžys, Lithuania. It is currently used mostly for football matches and is the home ground of FK Panevėžys and earlier of FK Ekranas Panevėžys. It is named Aukštaitija, one of the five regions of Lithuania.
