= FK Prelegentai Vilnius =

Lithuanian football club

- Full name: FK Prelegentai Vilnius
- Nickname: –
Home colours

FK Prelegentai Vilnius is a Lithuanian football team. The team plays in the Lithuanian Football Cup.

Many of the players in the team come from show business.

== History ==
The club was founded in the summer of 1996 by Martynas Starkus, Giedrius Klimkevičius, Linas Kunigėlis ir Vytaras Radzevičius.

In 2005 the Sunday Football League (Sekmadienio Futbolo Lyga, SFL) was founded. One of initiators were Prelegentai.

Prelegentai were champions of the A division for four seasons.

The team was in the 3rd league of VFRS in 2015, but was unable to continue the season, because they were not able to play in full squad. They withdrew from the remaining matches.
