= FC Hegelmann =

Lithuanian football club

Hegelmann
- Full name: Futbolo klubas Hegelmann
- Founded: January 2009; 17 years ago
- Ground: Raudondvaris Stadium
- Capacity: 1,550
- Coordinates: 54°54′15″N 23°55′49″E
- Chairman: Dainius Šumauskas
- Manager: Tadas Vilkevičius
- League: TOPLYGA
- 2026: TOPLYGA, 8th of 10
- Website: https://fchegelmann.com/
Home colours	Away colours

Futbolo klubas Hegelmann, commonly known as Hegelmann, is a Lithuanian professional football club located in Raudondvaris in Kaunas district. Before January 2022, the club was named FC Hegelmann Litauen. They play in the TOPLYGA, the first tier of Lithuanian football.

== History ==
The club was founded under the name FC Hegelmann Litauen at the beginning of 2009 by Hegelmann Transporte, a German-owned freight forwarding and logistics company. Hegelmann refers to the family name of Anton Hegelmann and Litauen means Lithuania in German. In January 2022, the club changed its logo and official name to FC Hegelmann, dropping and dropped the word Litauen.

FC Hegelmann started in the lower Lithuanian divisions but reached first place in the 2018 II Lyga and got promoted to the I Lyga, the second-highest league. The club reached 7th place in 2019 LFF I Lyga. Despite this fact, the club lodged an application to play in A Lyga in 2020. The club later withdrew the application and remained in the second division. In the 2020 season, the club reached second place in the I Lyga and got promoted to the A Lyga.

In January 2021, Andrius Skerla was introduced as the new head coach, replacing Artūras Ramoška. Hegelmann finished their debut season in the Lithuanian top division in fifth place.

In the 2022 Lithuanian Football Cup, the club beat FK Panevėžys in the semi-finals to reach the cup final for the first time. The final was lost 1–2 after extra time against FK Žalgiris. In the 2022 A Lyga season, Hegelmann Club finished in fourth place and qualified for the first qualification round for the 2023–24 UEFA Europa Conference League. In the first European game in its history, the club played against Macedonian club KF Shkupi. The away game resulted in a goalless draw, but Hegelmann lost the home game 0–5 and dropped out of the competition. They finished the 2023 A Lyga in fifth position.

== Honours ==
A Lyga

- Runners-up (2): 2024, 2025

I Lyga

- Runners-up (1): 2020

II Lyga Southern Zone

- Winners (1): 2018

Lithuanian Cup

- Winners (0):
- Runners-up (3): 2022, 2024, 2025

== Recent seasons ==
Season	Level	Division	Position	Web
2016	2.	Pirma lyga	10.	
2017	3.	Antra lyga	6.	
2018	3.	Antra lyga	1.	
2019	2.	Pirma lyga	7.	
2020	2.	Pirma lyga	2.	
2021	1.	A lyga	5.	
2022	1.	A lyga	4.	
2023	1.	A lyga	5.	
2024	1.	A lyga	2.	
2025	1.	A lyga	2.	

== Stadium ==
Club played their home matches in NFA Stadium. The current capacity of the stadium is 500 seats.

On 22 September 2024 club made debut in new home ground Raudondvaris Stadium (Raudondvario stadionas) in Raudondvaris (Kaunas district).

== Current squad ==
As of 15 July 2026

Note: Flags indicate national team as defined under FIFA eligibility rules; some limited exceptions apply. Players may hold more than one non-FIFA nationality.

No.	Pos.	Nation	Player
1	GK	LTU	Lukas Paukštė
5	DF	ESP	Angel Puerto
6	MF	CIV	Harouna Samad
7	MF	JPN	Carlos Duke
8	MF	LTU	Vilius Armanavičius
9	MF	LTU	Donatas Kazlauskas
10	MF	CMR	Samuel Gouet
16	MF	LTU	Matijus Remeikis
18	DF	LTU	Rimvydas Sadauskas
19	MF	LTU	Dominykas Pašilys
20	FW	LTU	Lukas Jonaitis

No.	Pos.	Nation	Player
21	MF	LTU	Esmilis Kaušinis
22	FW	SWE	Darrell Tibell
26	DF	LTU	Domas Slendzoka
30	DF	NGR	Isaac Barry
31	GK	LTU	Rokas Bagdonavičius
37	DF	BIH	Vedad Radonja
45	MF	UKR	Artem Shchedryi
55	DF	LTU	Nojus Stelmokas
67	FW	LTU	Andrius Kaulinis
71	MF	LTU	Elingas Jonavičius
77	MF	BRA	Wesley Gabriel
80	GK	LTU	Lukas Kolendo

== European record ==
Season	Competition	Round	Opponent	Home	Away	Agg.
2023–24	UEFA Europa Conference League	1Q	(North Macedonia) Shkupi	0−5	0−0	0−5
2025–26	UEFA Conference League	1Q	(Republic of Ireland) St Patrick's Athletic	0−2	0−1	0−3
2026–27	UEFA Conference League	1Q	(Estonia) Paide Linnameeskond	1−1	0-3	1-4

== Managers ==
- (Lithuania) Linas Treigys (2015)
- (Lithuania) Dainius Šumauskas (2017)
- (Lithuania) Vytautas Masaitis (2018–2019)
- (Lithuania) Artūras Ramoška (2020)
- (Lithuania) Andrius Skerla (2021–2025)
- (Spain) Mikel Aramburu (16 January 2026– 15 September 2026)

== Notable players ==
Players who have either appeared in at least one match for their respective national teams at any time or received an individual award while at the club. Players whose names are listed in bold represented their countries while playing for FC Hegelmann.

Lithuania

- (Lithuania) Nauris Petkevičius (2020–2021)
- (Lithuania) **Klaudijus Upstas** (2020–2025)
- (Lithuania) **Vilius Armanavičius** (2020–2023, 2026–)
- (Lithuania) **Matijus Remeikis** (2025–)
- (Lithuania) Donatas Kazlauskas (2025–)
- (Lithuania) **Vilius Armalas** (2021, 2022–2025)
- (Lithuania) **Lukas Paukštė** (2026–)

Europe
