= Lithuanian Football Cup =

- Organiser(s): Lithuanian Football Federation
- Founded: 1924; 102 years ago
- Region: Lithuania
- Qualifier for: UEFA Europa Conference League
- Domestic cup: Lithuanian Supercup
- Current champions: FK Kauno Žalgiris (1st title)
- Most championships: Žalgiris (14 titles)
- Broadcaster: LRT
- 2026 Lithuanian Football Cup

The Lithuanian Football Federation Cup (Lithuanian: Lietuvos futbolo federacijos taurė), is a Lithuanian football cup competition organized in a knockout tournament format. The winner of the cup gains entitlement to participate in the Lithuanian Supercup, as well as the UEFA Conference League.

Participation is mandatory for the clubs playing in A Lyga, I Lyga, and II Lyga. Participation is voluntary for all lower division teams as long as they meet basic eligibility criteria. Club reserve and youth teams are no longer eligible to participate.

== History ==
=== Interwar period ===
The first cup tournament during the interwar period in Lithuania took place in 1924 and was called the "Kooperacijos taurė". It took place during the International Cooperation Day event. The competition took place three times: in 1924, 1925, and 1926. Other cup competitions took place at the same time as well: "Žiemos taurė" (lith. Winter Cup) in 1925, "Pavasario taurė" (lith. Spring Cup) in 1926 and 1927, and other once-off cup events.

Year	Tournament	Final	Notes
1924	Kooperacijos taurė	LFLS Kaunas 2–1 Kovas Kaunas	Founded by a banker, Vincas Zakarevičius. The cup (50 cm in diameter, weighing 1,250g) was made of silver and gold-plated materials, with a cost of 1,000 Litas.
1925	Kooperacijos taurė	LFLS Kaunas 3–2 Kovas Kaunas	LFLS Kaunas won the cup for the second time. The cup was to be passed on to the winner each year, and to be kept if won three times in a row.
1925	Žiemos taurė	KSK Kaunas 2–0 Kovas Kaunas	
1926	Kooperacijos taurė	LFLS Kaunas 4–3 Kovas Kaunas	LFLS Kaunas won the cup for three years in a row, and fulfilled the condition to keep the cup.
1926	Pavasario taurė		Organized by LFLS central committee.
1926	Lithuanian Cup of Honour		The 2,000 Litas cup was founded by the famous singer Kipras Petrauskas, yet it was not supported by the governing football committee. The cup was presented to the previous year football league champion Kovas Kaunas.
1927	Pavasario taurė	Makabi Kaunas 3–2 Kovas Kaunas	10 A and B class Kaunas teams competed.
1927	Lloyd Lithuania Cup		The cup was presented to the Kaunas region league champion LFLS Kaunas.
1928	Florence Pavasario taurė	LFLS Kaunas 2–0 Kovas Kaunas	12 teams competed.
1929	Lietuvos aido taurė	LFLS Kaunas 4–0 Makabi Kaunas	
1932	Sekminių taurė	LFLS Kaunas 5–1 Kovas Kaunas	The cup was founded to replace the Kooperacijos taurė competition.
1935	Lithuanian I Sports Festival	MSK Kaunas 2–2 Tauras Kaunas	6 teams from Kaunas and 4 teams from Latvia competed in the tournament.
1938	Lithuanian National Olympics	KSS Klaipėda 2–0 LGSF Kaunas	16 teams participated, including 1 team from Latvia. The tournament was a part of a prestigious Lithuanian National Olympics event.

=== Post-war period ===
In the post-war period after World War II, in Soviet Lithuania, a cup competition was established by the initiative of Tiesa newspaper in 1947 and was called The Tiesa Cup. It consisted of the Lithuanian SSR teams who were not competing in the Soviet football league pyramid.

=== 1990 to present ===
After Lithuania regained independence in 1990, the competition has been called the Lithuanian Football Federation Cup.

The following seasons also incorporated sponsor names into the title:

- 2003 – LFF Tauro Cup
- 2012–13 – LFF Carlsberg Cup
- 2013–14 – LFF Druskininkų Hermio Cup
- 2018–19 – Sharp LFF Cup
- 2020–23 – Hegelmann LFF Cup
- 2024–25 – FPRO LFF Cup

== Finals ==
Year	Winner	Runner-Up	Result	Location
Soviet Era (Tiesa Cup)
1947	Lokomotyvas Kaunas	Vėliava Šiauliai	3–2	Miesto stadionas, Vilnius
1948	Inkaras Kaunas	Lokomotyvas Kaunas	4–0	Valstybinis stadionas, Vilnius
1949	Inkaras Kaunas	Audiniai Kaunas	1–0	KKI Stadionas, Kaunas
1950	Elnias Šiauliai	Inkaras Kaunas	4–0	Valstybinis stadionas, Vilnius
1951	Inkaras Kaunas	Elnias Šiauliai	2–0	Dinamo stadionas, Vilnius
1952	Karininkų namai Vilnius	Dinamo Vilnius	1–0	Dinamo stadionas, Vilnius
1953	Lima Kaunas	Trinyčiai Klaipėda	4–2	Valstybinis stadionas, Vilnius
1954	Inkaras Kaunas	KPI Kaunas	4–0	KKI Stadionas, Kaunas
1955	KPI Kaunas	Linų audiniai Plungė	2–0	Jaunimo stadionas, Vilnius
1956	Raudonasis Spalis Kaunas	Raudonoji žvaigždė Vilnius	3–0	Jaunimo stadionas, Vilnius
1957	Elnias Šiauliai	MSK Panevėžys	2–0	Žalgirio stadionas, Šiauliai
1958	FK Spartakas Vilnius	Melioratorius Kretinga	5–3 (a.e.t)	Miesto stadionas, Kretinga
1959	Elnias Šiauliai	KKI Kaunas	2–0	Žalgirio stadionas, Šiauliai
1960	FK Panemunė Kaunas	Inkaras Kaunas	2–1	KKI Stadionas, Kaunas
1961	Cementininkas Akmenė	EAG Kėdainiai	2–1	Miesto stadionas, Kėdainiai
1962	Lima Kaunas	Šešupė Kapsukas	3–1	Miesto stadionas, Kapsukas
1963	Saliutas Vilnius	FK Žalgiris Naujoji Vilnia	1–0	Žalgirio stadionas, Vilnius
1964	FK Minija Kretinga	Baltija Klaipėda	3–2	Miesto stadionas, Kretinga
1965	Inkaras Kaunas	Saliutas Vilnius	4–2	Žalgirio stadionas, Vilnius
1966	FK Žalgiris Naujoji Vilnia	Saliutas Vilnius	0–0 / 1–0 (Note: Per rules of the time, a game that ended in a tie would be rescheduled to be played on the following day.)	Jaunimo stadionas, Vilnius
1967	Nevėžis Kėdainiai	FK Statyba Panevėžys	2–1	Centrinis stadionas, Panevėžys
1968	Nevėžis Kėdainiai	Pažanga Vilnius	6–0	Miesto stadionas, Kėdainiai
1969	Inkaras Kaunas	Vienybė Ukmergė	3–1 (2–0 / 1–1)	Miesto stadionas, Ukmergė / Inkaro stadionas, Kaunas
1970	Nevėžis Kėdainiai	FK Minija Kretinga	3–1 (0–0 / 3–1)	Miesto stadionas, Kretinga / Miesto stadionas, Kėdainiai
1971	Pažanga Vilnius	FK Statyba Panevėžys	4–1 (1–0 / 3–1)	Žalgirio stadionas, Vilnius / Centrinis stadionas, Panevėžys
1972	Nevėžis Kėdainiai	Ekranas Panevėžys	4–3 (1–1 / 3–2)	Miesto stadionas, Kėdainiai / Centrinis stadionas, Panevėžys
1973	Nevėžis Kėdainiai	Pažanga Vilnius	1–0	Miesto stadionas, Kėdainiai
1974	Statybininkas Šiauliai	Kelininkas Kaunas	2–1	Statybininko stadionas, Šiauliai
1975	Vienybė Ukmergė	Statybininkas Šiauliai	3–0	Žalgirio stadionas, Vilnius
1976	Kelininkas Kaunas	Sūduva Kapsukas	2–1 (a.e.t)	Žalgirio stadionas, Vilnius
1977	Granitas Klaipėda	Kelininkas Kaunas	2–0	Žalgirio stadionas, Vilnius
1978	Kelininkas Kaunas	Kooperatininkas Plungė	2–0	Linų audinių stadionas, Plungė
1979	Kelininkas Kaunas	Atmosfera Mažeikiai	1–0	Sporto kombinato stadionas, Kaunas
1980	Kelininkas Kaunas	Banga Kaunas	3–1	Sporto kombinato stadionas, Kaunas
1981	Granitas Klaipėda	Banga Kaunas	2–0	Žalgirio stadionas, Klaipėda
1982	Pažanga Vilnius	Nevėžis Kėdainiai	2–0	Žalgirio stadionas, Vilnius
1983	Granitas Klaipėda	SRT Vilnius	2–1 (a.e.t)	Žalgirio stadionas, Vilnius
1984	SRT Vilnius	Banga Kaunas	2–2 (3–1 pen.)	Sporto kombinato stadionas, Kaunas
1985	Ekranas Panevėžys	Banga Kaunas	0–0 (4–3 pen.)	Sporto kombinato stadionas, Kaunas
1986	Granitas Klaipėda	Banga Kaunas	3–1	Žalgirio stadionas, Klaipėda
1987	SRT Vilnius	Inkaras Kaunas	0–0 (5–4 pen.)	Pasvalys
1988	FK Sirijus Klaipėda	Kelininkas Kaunas	3–2	Jonavos stadionas, Jonava
1989	Banga Kaunas	Tauras Tauragė	2–0	Miesto stadionas, Palanga
Independent Lithuania — (LFF Cup)
1990	FK Sirijus Klaipėda	Žalgiris Vilnius	0–0 (4–3 pen.)	Vytauto stadionas, Tauragė
1991	Žalgiris Vilnius	Tauras Šiauliai	1–0 (a.e.t)	Žalgirio stadionas, Kaunas
1991–92	Lietuvos Makabi Vilnius	Žalgiris Vilnius	1–0	Vingio stadionas, Vilnius
1992–93	Žalgiris Vilnius	FK Sirijus Klaipėda	1–0	Miesto stadionas, Palanga
1993–94	Žalgiris Vilnius	Ekranas Panevėžys	4–2	S. Dariaus ir S. Girėno stadionas, Kaunas
1994–95	Inkaras Kaunas	Žalgiris Vilnius	2–1	Žalgirio stadionas, Klaipėda
1995–96	Kareda-Sakalas Šiauliai	Inkaras-Grifas Kaunas	2–0	Žalgirio stadionas, Vilnius
1996–97	Žalgiris Vilnius	Inkaras-Grifas Kaunas	1–0	Sporto ir rekreacijos stadionas, Alytus
1997–98	Ekranas Panevėžys	FBK Kaunas	1–0	Žalgirio stadionas, Vilnius
1998–99	Kareda Šiauliai	FBK Kaunas	3–0 (a.e.t)	Aukštaitijos stadionas, Panevėžys
1999–2000	Ekranas Panevėžys	Žalgiris Vilnius	1–0	Sūduvos stadionas, Marijampolė
2000–01	Atlantas Klaipėda	Žalgiris Vilnius	1–0	Aukštaitijos stadionas, Panevėžys
2001–02	FBK Kaunas	Sūduva Marijampolė	3–1	Sporto ir rekreacijos stadionas, Alytus
2002–03	Atlantas Klaipėda	Vėtra Rūdiškės	1–1 (3–1 pen.)	Telšiai Central Stadium, Telšiai
2003	Žalgiris Vilnius	Ekranas Panevėžys	3–1	Utenio stadionas, Utena
2004	FBK Kaunas	Atlantas Klaipėda	0–0 (2–1 pen.)	Savivaldybės stadionas, Šiauliai
2005	FBK Kaunas	Vėtra Vilnius	2–0 (a.e.t)	Vėtros stadionas, Vilnius
2006	Sūduva Marijampolė	Ekranas Panevėžys	1–0	S. Dariaus ir S. Girėno stadionas, Kaunas
2007–08	FBK Kaunas	Vėtra Vilnius	2–1	Žalgirio stadionas, Vilnius
2008–09	Sūduva Marijampolė	Tauras Tauragė	1–0	S. Dariaus ir S. Girėno stadionas, Kaunas
2009–10	Ekranas Panevėžys	Vėtra Vilnius	2–1	S. Dariaus ir S. Girėno stadionas, Kaunas
2010–11	Ekranas Panevėžys	Banga Gargždai	4–2 (a.e.t)	Sporto ir rekreacijos stadionas, Alytus
2011–12	Žalgiris Vilnius	Ekranas Panevėžys	0–0 (3–1 pen.)	ARVI Football Arena, Marijampolė
2012–13	Žalgiris Vilnius	Šiauliai	3–3 (8–7 pen.)	S. Dariaus ir S. Girėno stadionas, Kaunas
2013–14	Žalgiris Vilnius	Banga Gargždai	2–1	Utenio stadionas, Utena
2014–15	Žalgiris Vilnius	Atlantas Klaipėda	2–0	Savivaldybės stadionas, Šiauliai
2015–16	Žalgiris Vilnius	Trakai	1–0 (a.e.t)	Telšiai Central Stadium, Telšiai
2016	Žalgiris Vilnius	Sūduva Marijampolė	2–0	Klaipėdos centrinis stadionas, Klaipėda
2017	Stumbras	Žalgiris Vilnius	1–0	Aukštaitijos stadionas, Panevėžys
2018	Žalgiris Vilnius	Stumbras	3–0	Alytaus stadionas, Alytus
2019	Sūduva Marijampolė	Banga Gargždai	4–0	Utenio stadionas, Utena
2020	FK Panevėžys	Sūduva Marijampolė	1–1 (5–4 pen.)	Aukštaitijos stadionas, Panevėžys
2021	FK Žalgiris	FK Panevėžys	5–1	Šiauliai municipal stadium, Šiauliai
2022	FK Žalgiris	FC Hegelmann	2–1 (a.e.t)	Darius and Girėnas Stadium, Kaunas
2023	FK Transinvest	FA Šiauliai	2–1	Darius and Girėnas Stadium, Kaunas
2024	FK Banga	FC Hegelmann	0–0, (4–1 pen.)	Darius and Girėnas Stadium, Kaunas
2025	FK Panevėžys	FC Hegelmann	1–0	Central Stadium of Jonava, Jonava
2026	FK Kauno Žalgiris	FK Minija Kretinga	3–0	Darius and Girėnas Stadium, Kaunas

== Performance by club ==
Clubs currently playing in Toplyga are shown in bold
. ^{†} — Defunct club
^{p} — Phoenix club

=== Winners ===
Club	Winners	Runners-up	Winning Years
**Žalgiris Vilnius**	14	5	1991, 1993, 1994, 1997, 2003, 2012, 2013, 2014, 2015, 2016, 2016, 2018, 2021, 2022
Inkaras Kaunas^{†}	7	5	1948, 1949, 1951, 1954, 1965, 1969, 1995
Atlantas Klaipėda^{†}	6	2	1977, 1981, 1983, 1986, 2001, 2003
FBK Kaunas^{†}	5	7	1989, 2001, 2004, 2005, 2008
Ekranas Panevėžys^{p}	5	5	1985, 1998, 2000, 2010, 2011
Nevėžis Kėdainiai	5	2	1967, 1968, 1970, 1972, 1973
Kelininkas Kaunas^{†}	4	3	1976, 1978, 1979, 1980
**Sūduva Marijampolė**	3	5	2006, 2009, 2019
Elnias Šiauliai^{†}	3	1	1950, 1957, 1959
Kareda Šiauliai^{†}	3	1	1974, 1996, 1999
Saliutas Vilnius^{†}	2	3	1952, 1963
Pažanga Vilnius^{†}	2	2	1971, 1982
SRT Vilnius^{†}	2	1	1984, 1987
Sirijus Klaipėda^{p}	2	1	1988, 1990
**FK Panevėžys**	2	1	2020, 2025
Lima Kaunas^{†}	2	—	1953, 1962
**Banga Gargždai**	1	3	2024
Minija Kretinga^{p}	1	2	1964
Lokomotyvas Kaunas^{†}	1	1	1947
KPI Kaunas^{†}	1	1	1955
Žalgiris Naujoji Vilnia^{†}	1	1	1966
Vienybė Ukmergė^{†}	1	1	1975
Stumbras Kaunas^{†}	1	1	2017
Raudonasis Spalis Kaunas^{†}	1	—	1956
Spartakas Vilnius^{†}	1	—	1958
Panemunė Kaunas^{†}	1	—	1960
Cementininkas Naujoji Akmenė^{p}	1	—	1961
Neris Vilnius^{†}	1	—	1992
**Transinvest Vilnius**	1	—	2023
**Kauno Žalgiris**	1	—	2026

=== Finalists without wins ===
Club	Finals	Years Runner-up
Vėtra Vilnius^{†}	4	2003, 2005, 2008, 2010
Statyba Panevėžys^{†}	3	1957, 1967, 1971
**Hegelmann Kaunas**	3	2022, 2024, 2025
Baltija Klaipėda^{†}	2	1953, 1964
Linų Audiniai Plungė^{†}	2	1955, 1978
Tauras Tauragė	2	1989, 2009
FK Šiauliai^{†}	2	1991, 2013
Vėliava Šiauliai^{†}	1	1947
Audiniai Kaunas^{†}	1	1949
Dinamo Vilnius^{†}	1	1952
KKI Kaunas^{†}	1	1959
FK Mažeikiai^{†}	1	1979
Trakai/Riteriai Vilnius^{†}	1	2016
**FA Šiauliai**	1	2023
