= 2015–16 FK Vojvodina season =

Vojvodina
2015–16 season
- President: Zoran Šćepanović
- Manager: Zlatomir Zagorčić (until 22 October 2015); Nenad Lalatović (from 11 November 2015)
- Stadium: Karađorđe Stadium
- SuperLiga: 4th
- Serbian Cup: Quarter finals
- Europa League: Play-off round
- Top goalscorer: League: Mirko Ivanić (8); All: Mirko Ivanić (10)
Home colours	Away colours

The 2015–16 season is FK Vojvodina's 11th season in the Serbian SuperLiga, the top-flight of Serbian football.

== Transfers ==
=== Summer ===
In: Note: Flags indicate national team as defined under FIFA eligibility rules; some limited exceptions apply. Players may hold more than one non-FIFA nationality.

No.	Pos.	Nation	Player
31	FW	SRB	Uroš Stamenić (loan return from Proleter Novi Sad)
10	MF	SRB	Aleksandar Paločević (from OFK Beograd)
7	MF	SRB	Aleksandar Stanisavljević (from Donji Srem)
9	FW	SRB	Miljan Mrdaković (from (Greece) Levadiakos)
22	MF	SRB	Marko Zoćević (from Borac Čačak)
14	DF	SRB	Ivan Lakićević (from Donji Srem)
28	MF	SRB	Novica Maksimović (from Spartak Subotica)
16	MF	SRB	Siniša Babić (from Proleter Novi Sad)
51	FW	SRB	Ognjen Ožegović (from Borac Čačak)
12	GK	SRB	Nikola Perić (from Jagodina)
27	FW	SRB	Milan Pavkov (from ČSK Čelarevo)
19	DF	SRB	Lazar Rosić (from Radnički Niš)
21	MF	SRB	Nikola Kovačević (from Radnički 1923)
20	DF	SRB	Nikola Antić (from Jagodina)
11	MF	MNE	Marko Vukčević (on loan from (Slovenia) Olimpija Ljubljana)

Out: Note: Flags indicate national team as defined under FIFA eligibility rules; some limited exceptions apply. Players may hold more than one non-FIFA nationality.

No.	Pos.	Nation	Player
18	MF	GEO	Davit Kokhia (released)
—	MF	SRB	Milan Spremo (to (Slovenia) Celje, was on loan at Proleter Novi Sad)
10	MF	SRB	Luka Luković (to (Switzerland) Biel-Bienne)
—	FW	SRB	Nikola Mojsilović (to Bačka (BP), was on loan at Radnik Surdulica)
32	MF	MNE	Janko Tumbasević (to Spartak Subotica)
28	FW	SRB	Luka Grgić (to Proleter Novi Sad, was on loan at ČSK Čelarevo)
3	DF	SRB	Nenad Kočović (to Proleter Novi Sad, was on loan at ČSK Čelarevo)
16	MF	SRB	Milan Makarić (to Spartak Subotica)
12	GK	SRB	Milan Jovanić (released)
30	GK	SRB	Vanja Milinković-Savić (loan return to (England) Manchester United)
19	DF	SRB	Stefan Nikolić (to Bačka (BP))
33	DF	SRB	Srđan Babić (to (Spain) Real Sociedad)
19	FW	MNE	Šaleta Kordić (to (Montenegro) Sutjeska Nikšić, previously brought from BSK Borča)
7	MF	SRB	Ivan Rogač (to OFK Beograd)
11	MF	SRB	Mijat Gaćinović (to (Germany) Eintracht Frankfurt)
22	FW	SRB	Jovan Stojanović (to Voždovac)
—	GK	SRB	Emil Rockov (on loan to Proleter Novi Sad, was on loan at Sloga Temerin)
17	MF	SRB	Dragan Karanov (on loan to Proleter Novi Sad)
20	MF	SRB	Elmir Asani (to Voždovac)
23	DF	SRB	Igor Đurić (to (Turkey) Karşıyaka, was on loan at Rad)
18	MF	SRB	Lazar Zličić (on loan to Proleter Novi Sad)
35	MF	SRB	Slobodan Novaković (to Proleter Novi Sad)

=== Winter ===
In: Note: Flags indicate national team as defined under FIFA eligibility rules; some limited exceptions apply. Players may hold more than one non-FIFA nationality.

No.	Pos.	Nation	Player
—	DF	SRB	Milan Stepanov (from (Bosnia and Herzegovina) Sarajevo)
7	MF	SRB	Dejan Meleg (from (Netherlands) Ajax)
23	DF	SRB	Milan Milinković (from Jagodina)
22	MF	SRB	Filip Malbašić (from (Germany) Hoffenheim)
33	DF	SRB	Nemanja Miletić (from Borac Čačak)
29	MF	SRB	Dušan Jovančić (from Borac Čačak)
4	MF	SRB	Dušan Mićić (from Borac Čačak)
92	FW	SRB	Nikola Trujić (from Partizan)
9	FW	SRB	Nikola Ašćerić (from Radnički Niš)

Out: Note: Flags indicate national team as defined under FIFA eligibility rules; some limited exceptions apply. Players may hold more than one non-FIFA nationality.

No.	Pos.	Nation	Player
7	MF	SRB	Aleksandar Stanisavljević (to (Greece) Asteras Tripolis)
9	FW	SRB	Miljan Mrdaković (to (Greece) Agrotikos Asteras)
3	DF	BIH	Slaviša Radović (to (Bosnia and Herzegovina) Olimpic)
2	DF	SRB	Jovica Vasilić (to Novi Pazar)
22	MF	SRB	Marko Zoćević (to Mladost Lučani)
4	MF	SRB	Mirko Ivanić (to (Belarus) BATE Borisov)
—	FW	SRB	Lazar Veselinović (was on loan, now signed with (South Korea) Pohang Steelers)
23	MF	SRB	Marko Đurišić (on loan to Proleter Novi Sad)
29	FW	SRB	Saša Ćurko (on loan to Proleter Novi Sad)
—	DF	SRB	Milan Lazarević (to Proleter Novi Sad)
26	DF	SRB	Dominik Dinga (to (Russia) Ural Sverdlovsk Oblast)
51	FW	SRB	Ognjen Ožegović (to (China) Changchun Yatai)
—	GK	SRB	Emil Rockov (was on loan, now signed with Proleter Novi Sad)

== Squad ==
As of 1 March 2016

Note: Flags indicate national team as defined under FIFA eligibility rules; some limited exceptions apply. Players may hold more than one non-FIFA nationality.

No.	Pos.	Nation	Player
1	GK	SRB	Srđan Žakula
4	MF	SRB	Dušan Mićić
5	DF	MNE	Milko Novaković
6	DF	SRB	Nino Pekarić (captain)
7	MF	SRB	Dejan Meleg
8	MF	SRB	Darko Puškarić
9	FW	SRB	Nikola Ašćerić
10	MF	SRB	Aleksandar Paločević
11	MF	MNE	Marko Vukčević
12	GK	SRB	Nikola Perić
13	DF	SRB	Radovan Pankov
14	DF	SRB	Ivan Lakićević
15	DF	SRB	Bojan Nastić
16	MF	SRB	Siniša Babić
17	MF	BIH	Darko Jović
19	DF	SRB	Lazar Rosić
20	DF	SRB	Nikola Antić

No.	Pos.	Nation	Player
21	MF	SRB	Nikola Kovačević
22	MF	SRB	Filip Malbašić
23	DF	SRB	Milan Milinković
24	MF	SRB	Danilo Sekulić
25	GK	MNE	Marko Kordić
26	FW	SRB	Miloš Zličić
27	FW	SRB	Milan Pavkov
28	MF	SRB	Novica Maksimović
29	MF	SRB	Dušan Jovančić
30	GK	SRB	Marko Ilić
31	FW	SRB	Uroš Stamenić
33	DF	SRB	Nemanja Miletić
35	GK	SRB	Aleksa Slijepčević
92	FW	SRB	Nikola Trujić
99	FW	CMR	John Mary
––	DF	SRB	Milan Stepanov

=== Players with multiple nationalities ===
- (Cameroon) (Nigeria) John Mary
- (Montenegro) (Serbia) Marko Kordić
- (Montenegro) (Serbia) Milko Novaković
- (Serbia) (Bosnia and Herzegovina) Bojan Nastić

== Competitions ==
=== Serbian SuperLiga ===
==== League table ====
Pos	Team	Pld	W	D	L	GF	GA	GD	Pts	Qualification
1	Red Star Belgrade (C)	37	30	5	2	97	27	+70	54	Qualification for the Champions League second qualifying round
2	Partizan	37	20	7	10	72	44	+28	40	Qualification for the Europa League second qualifying round (Note: Since the winners of the 2015–16 Serbian Cup, Partizan, qualified for European competition based on league position, the spot awarded to the second-placed team (Europa League first qualifying round) was passed to the fourth-placed team.)
3	Čukarički	37	19	8	10	48	35	+13	39	Qualification for the Europa League first qualifying round
4	Vojvodina	37	16	11	10	57	44	+13	36	Qualification for the Europa League first qualifying round
5	Radnički Niš	37	16	9	12	40	35	+5	35	
6	Borac Čačak	37	14	11	12	46	43	+3	30	
7	Voždovac	37	11	12	14	34	36	−2	25	
8	Radnik Surdulica	37	11	11	15	41	65	−24	25	

Source: UEFA, Soccerway
Rules for classification: 1) Points; 2) Points in regular season; 3) Head-to-head points in regular season; 4) Head-to-head goal difference in regular season; 5) Head-to-head away goals scored in regular season (if two teams tied); 6) Goal difference; 7) Goals scored; 8) Fair-play ranking; 9) Play-off (if two teams tied); 10) Draw (if three or more teams tied).
(Note: Criterion 9 is only used if deciding Champion and places for European competitions.)
(C) Champions

=== Serbian Cup ===
28 October 2015 First round	Kolubara	0–0 (4–5 p)	Vojvodina	Stadion FK Kolubara, Lazarevac
13:00	Morariju (yellow card) 48' (yellow-red card)			Attendance: 3000; Referee: Petar Piper
	Penalties
	Stojković (penalty scored); Paunović (penalty scored); Bubanja (penalty scored); Z. Stojanović (penalty scored); I. Stojanović (penalty missed); Dinčić (penalty missed)		(penalty missed) Ivanić; (penalty scored) Paločević; (penalty scored) Maksimović; (penalty scored) Antić; (penalty scored) Ožegović; (penalty scored) Rosić

2 December 2015 Second round	Vojvodina	1–0	Inđija	Stadion Karađorđe, Novi Sad
15:00	Babić 77'			Attendance: 500; Referee: Aleksandar Vasić

2 March 2016 Quarterfinal	Javor	2–2 (5–3 p)	Vojvodina	Gradski stadion, Ivanjica
16:00	Docić 25'; Đokić 89'		47' Ašćerić; 69' Babić	Attendance: 1200; Referee: Danilo Grujić
	Penalties
	Đokić (penalty scored); Josović (penalty scored); Docić (penalty scored); Dražić (penalty scored); Stojaković (penalty scored)		(penalty scored) Malbašić; (penalty missed) Rosić; (penalty scored) Babić; (penalty scored) Pankov

=== UEFA Europa League ===
==== Qualifying rounds ====
2 July 2015 First qualifying round 1st leg	MTK Budapest (Hungary)	0–0	(Serbia) Vojvodina	Ferenc Szusza Stadium, Budapest (Note: MTK Budapest played their home match at Ferenc Szusza Stadium, Budapest, instead of their temporary stadium Bozsik Stadion, Budapest.)
20:30		Report		Attendance: 902; Referee: Paolo Valeri (Italy)

9 July 2015 First qualifying round 2nd leg	Vojvodina (Serbia)	3–1 (3 – 1 agg.)	(Hungary) MTK Budapest	Karađorđe Stadium, Novi Sad
20:30	Stanisavljević 14'; Mrdaković 40'; Ivanić 51'	Report	Střeštík 3'	Attendance: 8,460; Referee: Tore Hansen (Norway)

16 July 2015 Second qualifying round 1st leg	Vojvodina (Serbia)	3–0	(Latvia) Spartaks Jūrmala	Karađorđe Stadium, Novi Sad
20:30	Stanisavljević 6'; Mrdaković 16'; Mickevičs 88' (o.g.)	Report		Attendance: 9,000; Referee: Benoît Millot (France)

23 July 2015 Second qualifying round 2nd leg	Spartaks Jūrmala (Latvia)	1–1 (1 – 4 agg.)	(Serbia) Vojvodina	Olympic Sports Center of Zemgale, Jelgava (Note: Spartaks Jūrmala played their home matches at Olympic Sports Center of Zemgale, Jelgava, instead of their regular stadium Slokas Stadium, Jūrmala.)
18:00	Vivacqua 90+3'	Report	Kordić 86'	Attendance: 650; Referee: Richard Liesveld (Netherlands)

30 July 2015 Third qualifying round 1st leg	Sampdoria (Italy)	0–4	(Serbia) Vojvodina	Stadio Olimpico, Turin (Note: Sampdoria played their home match at Stadio Olimpico, Turin, instead of their regular stadium Stadio Luigi Ferraris, Genoa, due to works on the playing surface.)
21:00		Report	Ivanić 4'; Stanisavljević 49'; Ožegović 58', 90+1'	Attendance: 4,200; Referee: Andreas Ekberg (Sweden)

6 August 2015 Third qualifying round 2nd leg	Vojvodina (Serbia)	0–2 (4 – 2 agg.)	(Italy) Sampdoria	Karađorđe Stadium, Novi Sad
21:00		Report	Éder 15'; Muriel 70'	Attendance: 10,763; Referee: Paweł Raczkowski (Poland)

20 August 2015 Playoff round 1st leg	Viktoria Plzeň (Czech Republic)	3–0	(Serbia) Vojvodina	Doosan Arena, Plzeň
20:50	Kopic 25', 82'; Vaněk 51'	Report		Attendance: 10,769; Referee: Javier Estrada Fernández (Spain)

27 August 2015 Playoff round 2nd leg	Vojvodina (Serbia)	0–2	(Czech Republic) Viktoria Plzeň	Karađorđe Stadium, Novi Sad
20:30		Report	Đurić 19' (o.g.); Ďuriš 60'	Attendance: 7,617; Referee: Michael Koukoulakis (Greece)
