= FK Utenos Utenis =

Lithuanian football club

- Full name: Viešoji įstaiga „Utenos Utenis“
- Founded: 2013
- Ground: Utenis Stadium
- Capacity: 3,000
- Chairman: Marius Treimakas
- Manager: Aurimas Meidus
- League: II Lyga, B division
- 2024: 7th, II Lyga, B division
- Website: http://www.utenosutenis.lt/
Home colours	Away colours

FK Utenis Utena is a football club, based in Utena, Lithuania. The club plays its home matches at the Utenis Stadium (capacity 3,000).

== History ==
The current club is the fourth iteration in the club history. Originally founded in 1933, the club went through tumultuous history of ups and downs. The predecessor of the current club FK Utenis Utena ceased to exist in 2011.

FK Utenos Utenis was founded in November 2013, and played in the I Lyga. The club achieved promotion to the top tier of Lithuanian football, and spent 3 seasons in A lyga between 2015 and 2017.

Between 2022 and 2024 the club had Capelli Sport as its majority share stakeholder. In 2022 a strategic partnership with Danish side HB Køge has been announced.

== Stadium ==
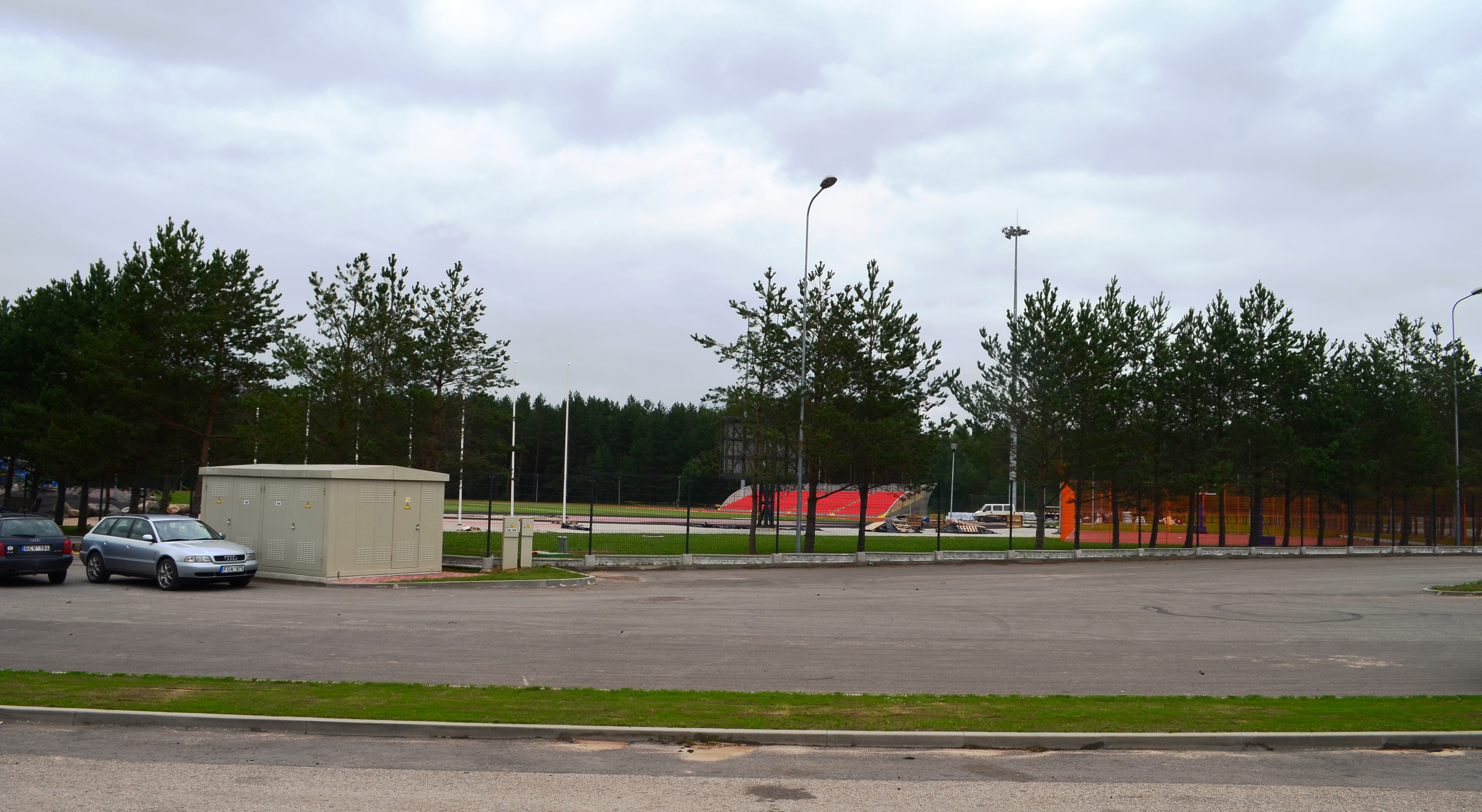
Utenis stadium

Utenis Stadium is a multi-purpose stadium in Utena, Lithuania. The stadium was renovated using funds from the European Union and opened on September 5, 2013. It is currently used mostly for football matches and is the home stadium of FK Utenos Utenis.

== Kit ==
From the establishment of the club, Utenis colours are blue and white, therefore the kit is blue/white variation of shirt, shorts and socks. Away kits are usually plain white or blue.

=== Kit manufacturers ===
Period	Kit manufacturer
2014–2015	Hummel
2016–2019	Adidas
2020–present	Capelli Sport

== Sponsors ==
Sponsors

(Lithuania) Utenos Alus
(Lithuania) Baltijos polistirenas
(Lithuania) Kia
(Lithuania) Duventa
(Lithuania) Ramirent
(Lithuania) Perskindol
(Lithuania) Umaras

Kit manufacturer

(United States) Capelli Sport

== Participation in Lithuanian championships ==
Season	League	Pos	P	W	D	L	F	A	Pts	Cup
2014-15	I Lyga	3rd	31	18	7	6	61	22	61	Third round
2015-16	A Lyga	6th	36	11	9	16	41	50	42	Quarter-finalist
2016	A Lyga	7th	28	4	4	20	24	47	16	Round of 32
2017	A Lyga	6th	33	8	9	16	30	56	33	Round of 32
2018	I Lyga	8th	26	12	5	9	46	33	41	Round of 32
2019	II Lyga	11th	24	5	4	15	27	71	19	Second round
2020	II Lyga	12th	18	4	1	13	23	43	13	Round of 32
2021	II Lyga	14th	28	10	8	10	39	36	38	Round of 32
2022	II Lyga	11th	24	10	5	9	49	43	35	Round of 32
2023	failed to obtain participant licence									-
2024	II Lyga, B div.	7th	18	3	1	14	24	69	10	First round
2025	II Lyga, B div.									Round of 32

== Current squad ==
Updated 2 August 2018

Note: Flags indicate national team as defined under FIFA eligibility rules; some limited exceptions apply. Players may hold more than one non-FIFA nationality.

No.	Pos.	Nation	Player
1	GK	RUS	Aleksėjus Kozlovas
31	GK	LTU	Marius Paukštė
3	DF	LTU	Vytautas Norkūnas
23	DF	LTU	Tadas Kanapka
32	DF	LTU	Emilijus Šinkūnas
33	DF	AUS	Connor Fotios Kass
34	DF	LTU	Mindaugas Ubeika
6	MF	LTU	Arnas Bražėnas
7	MF	LTU	Mantas Savėnas
10	MF	COL	John Hernandez
13	MF	LTU	Gabrielius Petuchovas
21	MF	LTU	Arnas Borodinas
44	MF	CIV	Max Cesar Sankan Bahi
5	FW	LTU	Arnas Jurevičius
9	FW	LTU	Kiril Levšin
17	FW	LTU	Džiugas Sūnelaitis
45	FW	LTU	Donatas Šėgžda

== Coaches ==
- (Lithuania) Mindaugas Čepas (Jan, 2014–May 7, 2016 )
- (Ukraine) Oleh Boychyshyn (May 7, 2016 – January 9, 2017)
- (Bosnia and Herzegovina) Zvezdan Milošević (January 9, 2017 – April 26, 2017)
- (Ukraine) Oleh Boychyshyn (April 26, 2017 – May 15, 2017)
- (Spain) David Campaña (May 15, 2017– November 2017)
- (Lithuania) Egidijus Varnas (Since 2018)
- (England) Aaron Harrington, Since February 17, 2024
- (Turkey) Onur Özkan, Since April 2024
- (Lithuania) Aurimas Meidus, Since 2025

== Partnership ==
- (Denmark) HB Køge
