= 2018–19 FC Ural Yekaterinburg season =

Ural Yekaterinburg
2018–19 season
- Chairman: Grigori Ivanov
- Manager: Dmytro Parfenov
- Stadium: SKB-Bank Arena
- Russian Premier League: 10th
- Russian Cup: Runners Up
- Top goalscorer: League: Two Players (6); All: Eric Bicfalvi (8)
Home colours	Away colours

The 2018–19 Ural season was the club's sixth successive season that the club played in the Russian Premier League, the highest tier of association football in Russia. They finished the season in 10th place, whilst they were runners up in the Russian Cup to Lokomotiv Moscow.

== Squad ==
Note: Flags indicate national team as defined under FIFA eligibility rules; some limited exceptions apply. Players may hold more than one non-FIFA nationality.

No.	Pos.	Nation	Player
2	DF	RUS	Shamsiddin Shanbiyev
3	DF	ARM	Varazdat Haroyan
4	DF	RUS	Sergei Bryzgalov
5	DF	SRB	Dominik Dinga
6	DF	SLO	Gregor Balažic
7	DF	RUS	Aleksandr Dantsev
8	DF	NOR	Stefan Strandberg (on loan from FC Krasnodar)
10	MF	ROU	Eric Bicfalvi
11	FW	RUS	Vladimir Ilyin
13	MF	CMR	Petrus Boumal
14	MF	RUS	Yuri Bavin
15	DF	UKR	Denys Kulakov
17	MF	BUL	Nikolay Dimitrov
19	DF	BLR	Dzyanis Palyakow
20	FW	RUS	Andrei Panyukov (on loan from Zenit Saint Petersburg)

No.	Pos.	Nation	Player
21	MF	SUI	Marco Aratore
26	DF	RUS	Mingiyan Beveyev
27	DF	RUS	Mikhail Merkulov
31	GK	RUS	Yaroslav Hodzyur
44	MF	RUS	Andrei Yegorychev
57	MF	RUS	Artyom Fidler (captain)
58	MF	NED	Othman El Kabir
60	GK	RUS	Vladislav Poletayev
70	MF	RUS	Ilya Zhigulyov (on loan from FC Krasnodar)
77	GK	RUS	Oleg Baklov
80	MF	RUS	Chingiz Magomadov
88	FW	RUS	Pavel Pogrebnyak
92	MF	RUS	Roman Yemelyanov
94	MF	RUS	Anatoli Katrich

=== Out on loan ===
Note: Flags indicate national team as defined under FIFA eligibility rules; some limited exceptions apply. Players may hold more than one non-FIFA nationality.

No.	Pos.	Nation	Player
—	GK	RUS	Dmitri Arapov (at Chayka Peschanokopskoye)
—	DF	RUS	Vladimir Khozin (at Ararat-Armenia)
—	MF	RUS	Aleksandr Lomakin (at Fakel Voronezh)
—	MF	RUS	Nikita Glushkov (at Baltika Kaliningrad)

== Transfers ==
=== Summer ===
In: Note: Flags indicate national team as defined under FIFA eligibility rules; some limited exceptions apply. Players may hold more than one non-FIFA nationality.

No.	Pos.	Nation	Player
4	DF	RUS	Sergei Bryzgalov (from (Russia) Anzhi Makhachkala)
18	DF	RUS	Dzhamaldin Khodzhaniyazov (from (Russia) Baltika Kaliningrad)
20	FW	RUS	Andrei Panyukov (on loan from (Russia) Zenit Saint Petersburg)
21	MF	SUI	Marco Aratore (from (Switzerland) St. Gallen)
33	GK	RUS	Vladimir Kutyryov
42	MF	RUS	Konstantin Sysoyev
49	FW	RUS	Sergei Itkin
54	MF	RUS	Sergei Krotov
56	MF	RUS	Vasili Koryukov
59	MF	RUS	Sergei Serchenkov (end of loan to (Armenia) Alashkert)
62	MF	RUS	Danil Khoroshev
64	DF	RUS	Ivan Vereshchagin
67	DF	RUS	Kirill Lukyanchikov (from (Russia) Rubin Kazan)
70	MF	RUS	Ilya Zhigulyov (on loan from (Russia) Krasnodar)
79	FW	RUS	Artyom Yusupov (end of loan to (Russia) Tyumen)
88	FW	RUS	Pavel Pogrebnyak (from (Russia) Tosno)

Out: Note: Flags indicate national team as defined under FIFA eligibility rules; some limited exceptions apply. Players may hold more than one non-FIFA nationality.

No.	Pos.	Nation	Player
2	DF	RUS	Vladimir Khozin (loan to Ararat-Armenia)
16	MF	RUS	Rezo Gavtadze
21	MF	UKR	Dmytro Khomchenovskyi (to (Ukraine) Zorya Luhansk)
22	DF	RUS	Kirill Kochnev (to (Russia) Ural-2 Yekaterinburg)
24	GK	RUS	Yevgeni Zharikov
28	DF	RUS	Nikita Chernov (end of loan from (Russia) CSKA Moscow)
29	FW	RUS	Elbeyi Guliyev
30	MF	RUS	Pavel Karpov
39	MF	RUS	Savva Knyazev
40	DF	RUS	Maksim Gorin (to (Russia) Ural-2 Yekaterinburg)
41	FW	RUS	Vladislav Pavlyuchenko
42	FW	RUS	Nikita Belous (to (Russia) Strogino Moscow)
43	MF	RUS	Aleksandr Golubtsov (to (Russia) Ural-2 Yekaterinburg)
46	MF	RUS	Vyacheslav Berdnikov (to (Russia) Ural-2 Yekaterinburg)
47	FW	RUS	Konstantin Reshetnikov
51	MF	RUS	Volodya Israelyan (to (Russia) Ural-2 Yekaterinburg)
54	MF	RUS	Nikita Muromsky
62	MF	RUS	Aleksandr Bunakov
64	MF	RUS	Pavel Kobzev (to (Russia) Rotor-2 Volgograd)
69	MF	RUS	Andrey Sheptiy (to (Russia) Ural-2 Yekaterinburg)
78	MF	RUS	Semyon Pomogayev
88	FW	RUS	Igor Portnyagin (end of loan from (Russia) Lokomotiv Moscow)
91	GK	RUS	Aleksandr Shubin
99	FW	ARM	Edgar Manucharyan (to (Armenia) Alashkert)
—	GK	RUS	Dmitri Arapov (on loan to (Russia) Chayka Peschanokopskoye, previously on loan to (Russia) Volgar Astrakhan)
—	GK	RUS	Andrei Timofeyev (to (Russia) Biolog-Novokubansk, previously on loan to (Russia) Syzran-2003)
—	DF	RUS	Denis Fomin (to (Russia) Tekstilshchik Ivanovo, previously on loan)
—	DF	SRB	Radovan Pankov (to (Serbia) Radnički Niš, previously on loan to (Cyprus) AEK Larnaca)
—	MF	RUS	Dmitri Korobov (to (Russia) Avangard Kursk, previously on loan)
—	MF	RUS	Aleksandr Lomakin (on loan to (Russia) Fakel Voronezh, previously on loan to (Russia) Yenisey Krasnoyarsk)
—	MF	RUS	Aleksandr Shcherbakov (to (Cyprus) Enosis Neon Paralimni, previously on loan to (Armenia) Alashkert)
—	MF	RUS	Aleksandr Stavpets (to (Russia) Tom Tomsk, previously on loan to (Russia) Tyumen)

=== Winter ===
In: Note: Flags indicate national team as defined under FIFA eligibility rules; some limited exceptions apply. Players may hold more than one non-FIFA nationality.

No.	Pos.	Nation	Player
2	DF	RUS	Shamsiddin Shanbiyev
8	DF	NOR	Stefan Strandberg (on loan from (Russia) Krasnodar)
19	DF	BLR	Dzyanis Palyakow (from (Belarus) BATE Borisov)
36	DF	RUS	Ivan Lyubukhin
47	MF	RUS	Aleksei Bulka
51	MF	RUS	Aleksandr Volchkov
52	FW	RUS	Igor Voronin
80	MF	RUS	Chingiz Magomadov (from (Russia) Akhmat Grozny)
82	FW	RUS	Sergei Arkhipovsky
84	MF	RUS	Danila Kushtin
94	MF	RUS	Anatoli Katrich (from (Russia) Krasnodar)

Out: Note: Flags indicate national team as defined under FIFA eligibility rules; some limited exceptions apply. Players may hold more than one non-FIFA nationality.

No.	Pos.	Nation	Player
8	MF	RUS	Alexey Yevseyev (to (Russia) Khimki)
9	MF	GEO	Giorgi Chanturia
18	DF	RUS	Dzhamaldin Khodzhaniyazov
32	MF	RUS	Nikita Glushkov (on loan to (Russia) Baltika Kaliningrad)
36	DF	RUS	Aleksei Fakhrutdinov
47	FW	RUS	Konstantin Reshetnikov
51	MF	RUS	Volodya Israelyan
79	FW	RUS	Artyom Yusupov (on loan to (Russia) Zenit St. Petersburg)
82	MF	RUS	Sergei Podoksyonov
84	DF	RUS	Nikita Beskrovny
96	FW	RUS	Nikolai Sidorkin

== Competitions ==
=== Russian Premier League ===
==== Results by round ====
Round	1	2	3	4	5	6	7	8	9	10	11	12	13	14	15	16	17	18	19	20	21	22	23	24	25	26	27	28	29	30
Ground	H	H	H	A	H	A	H	A	H	A	H	H	A	H	A	A	A	H	A	H	A	H	A	H	A	A	H	A	H	A
Result	L	L	D	L	W	L	D	W	W	L	D	D	W	W	W	L	L	L	D	L	L	W	D	W	W	L	L	D	D	W
Position	14	15	15	15	14	15	14	12	8	10	12	12	9	7	6	8	9	11	11	13	13	11	12	11	10	10	11	11	11	10

Updated to match(es) played on 26 May 2019. Source: See Results
A = Away; H = Home; W = Win; D = Draw; L = Loss

==== Results ====
28 July 2018 1	Ural Yekaterinburg	0 – 1	Anzhi Makhachkala	Yekaterinburg
18:30 YEKT (UTC+5)	Dinga (yellow card) 90+3'	Report	Gigolayev (yellow card) 24'; Tetrashvili (yellow card) 41'; Rabiu (yellow card) 52'; Markelov (yellow card) 72'; Anton 83'	Stadium: Central Stadium; Attendance: 15,194; Referee: Sergey Ivanov

4 August 2018 2	Ural Yekaterinburg	1 – 2	Krasnodar	Yekaterinburg
16:00 YEKT (UTC+5)	Bicfalvi 6'; Yemelyanov (yellow card) 37'; Dimitrov (yellow card) 81'	Report	Kaboré (yellow card) 26'; Claesson 48'; Spajić (yellow card) 53'; Ramírez (yellow card) 86'; Mamayev 89'	Stadium: Central Stadium; Attendance: 20,326; Referee: Vasiliy Kazartsev

10 August 2018 3	Ural Yekaterinburg	1 – 1	Dynamo Moscow	Yekaterinburg
19:30 YEKT (UTC+5)	Yemelyanov (yellow card) 43'; Bicfalvi 54'	Report	Sosnin (yellow card) 83'; Markov 85'	Stadium: Central Stadium; Attendance: 16,271; Referee: Nikolay Voloshin

19 August 2018 4	Zenit St.Petersburg	4 – 1	Ural Yekaterinburg	Saint Petersburg
21:00 YEKT (UTC+5)	Driussi 12', 16'; Dzyuba 78'; Kranevitter (yellow card) 85'; Paredes 89'	Report	Bavin 6'; Bicfalvi (yellow card) 43'; Haroyan (yellow card) 74'; Yevseyev (yellow card) 88'	Stadium: Krestovsky Stadium; Attendance: 45,545; Referee: Stanislav Vasilyev

25 August 2018 5	Ural Yekaterinburg	2 – 1	Akhmat Grozny	Yekaterinburg
16:00 YEKT (UTC+5)	Boumal (yellow card) 33'; Bicfalvi 50'; Balažic (yellow card) 75'; Dimitrov 78'	Report	Doumbia 29'; Shvets (yellow card) 32'; Ismael (yellow card) 71'	Stadium: Central Stadium; Attendance: 18,106; Referee: Aleksei Matyunin

1 September 2018 6	CSKA Moscow	4 – 0	Ural Yekaterinburg	Moscow
18:30 YEKT (UTC+5)	Chalov 13', 31', 85'; Chernov (yellow card) 29'; Bistrović 88'	Report	Bryzgalov (yellow card) 4'; Panyukov (yellow card) 33'; Boumal (penalty missed) 51'	Stadium: VEB Arena; Attendance: 19,119; Referee: Kirill Levnikov

17 September 2018 7	Ural Yekaterinburg	1 – 1	Rostov	Yekaterinburg
19:30 YEKT (UTC+5)	Haroyan 47'; Boumal (yellow card) 84'; Fidler (yellow card) 90+1'	Report	Ionov 49'; Guliyev (yellow card) 61'	Stadium: Central Stadium; Attendance: 18,337; Referee: Roman Galimov

22 September 2018 8	Yenisey Krasnoyarsk	1 – 2	Ural Yekaterinburg	Krasnoyarsk
13:30 YEKT (UTC+5)	Zanev 59'	Report	Dimitrov (yellow card) 17'; Semakin 25' (o.g.); Ilyin 58'; Boumal (yellow card) 63'	Stadium: Central Stadium; Attendance: 12,098; Referee: Vitaly Meshkov

29 September 2018 9	Ural Yekaterinburg	2 – 1	Arsenal Tula	Yekaterinburg
13:30 YEKT (UTC+5)	Kulakov (yellow card) 56'; Panyukov 63', 84'; Boumal (yellow card) 83'; Bicfalvi (yellow card) 90+4'	Report	Tkachyov 27'; Khagush (yellow card) 52'; Berkhamov (yellow card) 61'	Stadium: Central Stadium; Attendance: 11,217; Referee: Sergey Lapochkin

6 October 2018 10	Rubin Kazan	1 – 0	Ural Yekaterinburg	Kazan
21:00 YEKT (UTC+5)	Azmoun 21' (yellow card) 68'; Konovalov (yellow card) 83'	Report		Stadium: Kazan Arena; Attendance: 5,750; Referee: Sergey Ivanov

20 October 2018 11	Ural Yekaterinburg	1 – 1	Krylia Sovetov	Yekaterinburg
16:00 YEKT (UTC+5)	Panyukov 29'; Yegorychev (yellow card) 42'; Yevseyev (yellow card) 77' (yellow-red card) 88'; Ilyin (yellow card) 83'; Haroyan (yellow card) 90+5'	Report	Denisov (yellow card) 34' (yellow-red card) 55'; Zotov (yellow card) 37'; Kanunnikov 51'; Ryzhikov (yellow card) 59'; Poluyakhtov (yellow card) 90+4'; Kornilenko (yellow card) 90+5'	Stadium: Central Stadium; Attendance: 13,248; Referee: Aleksey Sukhoy

27 October 2018 12	Ural Yekaterinburg	1 – 1	Ufa	Yekaterinburg
17:00 YEKT (UTC+5)	Haroyan (yellow card) 37'; Bicfalvi 61'; Fidler (yellow card) 77' (yellow-red card) 86'; Balažic (yellow card) 89'	Report	Salatić (yellow card) 32'; Alikin 44'; Thill (yellow card) 68'	Stadium: Central Stadium; Attendance: 11,432; Referee: Aleksey Eskov

4 November 2018 13	Spartak Moscow	1 – 2	Ural Yekaterinburg	Moscow
21:00 YEKT (UTC+5)	Kutepov (yellow card) 28'; Dzhikiya (yellow card) 38'; Luiz Adriano 74'	Report	Haroyan (yellow card) 17'; Dimitrov 29'; Panyukov (yellow card) 38' (goal) 76'; Kulakov (yellow card) 45'; Bavin (yellow card) 47'; El Kabir (yellow card) 90'	Stadium: Otkritie Arena; Attendance: 23,237; Referee: Vitaly Meshkov

10 November 2018 14	Ural Yekaterinburg	2 – 1	Orenburg	Yekaterinburg
16:00 YEKT (UTC+5)	Dimitrov 31', 86'; Fidler (yellow card) 84'; Ilyin (yellow card) 90+1'	Report	Miškić (yellow card) 45'; Malykh (yellow card) 62'; Begić 89'	Stadium: Central Stadium; Attendance: 4,213; Referee: Sergey Karasev

23 November 2018 15	Lokomotiv Moscow	1 – 2	Ural Yekaterinburg	Moscow
22:30 YEKT (UTC+5)	An.Miranchuk (yellow card) 15'; Smolov 26'	Report	Ilyin (yellow card) 25'; Kulakov 31' (yellow card) 75'; El Kabir 51' (pen.)	Stadium: RZD Arena; Attendance: 12,111; Referee: Sergey Lapochkin

2 December 2018 16	Krasnodar	2 – 0	Ural Yekaterinburg	Krasnodar
16:00 YEKT (UTC+5)	Petrov (yellow card) 23'; Suleymanov 56' (yellow card) 69'; Cueva (yellow card) 61'; Ignatyev 76'; Claesson (yellow card) 88'	Report	Haroyan (yellow card) 22'	Stadium: Krasnodar Stadium; Attendance: 12,313; Referee: Sergey Ivanov

9 December 2018 17	Dynamo Moscow	4 – 0	Ural Yekaterinburg	Khimki
16:00 YEKT (UTC+5)	Joãozinho 12' (yellow card) 84'; Lutsenko 44'; Tetteh 61'; Kozlov 72'	Report	Bryzgalov (yellow card) 39'; Ilyin (yellow card) 41'	Stadium: Arena Khimki; Attendance: 4,825; Referee: Vladimir Moskalyov

2 March 2019 18	Ural Yekaterinburg	0 – 1	Zenit St.Petersburg	Yekaterinburg
11:30 MSK (UTC+3)	Boumal (yellow card) 30'; Bicfalvi (yellow card) 70'; El Kabir (yellow card) 85'	Report	Azmoun 42'; Lunyov (yellow card) 90+3'	Stadium: Central Stadium; Attendance: 20,365; Referee: Vitali Meshkov

11 March 2019 19	Akhmat Grozny	1 – 1	Ural Yekaterinburg	Grozny
19:30 YEKT (UTC+5)	Balaj 55' (pen.); Berisha (yellow card) 71'; Gorodov (yellow card) 90+1'	Report	Mohammadi 38' (o.g.); El Kabir (yellow card) 55'	Stadium: Akhmat-Arena; Attendance: 9,127; Referee: Pavel Kukuyan

16 March 2019 20	Ural Yekaterinburg	0 – 1	CSKA Moscow	Yekaterinburg
16:00 YEKT (UTC+5)	Boumal (yellow card) 20'	Report	Magnússon (yellow card) 15'; Diveyev (yellow card) 30'; Nababkin (yellow card) 55'; Fernandes 75'	Stadium: Central Stadium; Attendance: 17,113; Referee: Vladislav Bezborodov

30 March 2019 21	Rostov	2 – 1	Ural Yekaterinburg	Rostov-on-Don
21:00 YEKT (UTC+5)	Ionov 10'; Parshivlyuk (yellow card) 15'; Zuyev (yellow card) 67'; Normann (yellow card) 86'; Pogrebnyak 90+3' (o.g.)	Report	El Kabir 52'; Pogrebnyak (yellow card) 79'	Stadium: Rostov Arena; Attendance: 27,487; Referee: Vasiliy Kazartsev

7 April 2019 22	Ural Yekaterinburg	3 – 2	Yenisey Krasnoyarsk	Yekaterinburg
16:00 YEKT (UTC+5)	Strandberg (yellow card) 13'; Dimitrov 72'; Pogrebnyak 85'; Panyukov 86'	Report	Yatchenko 21' (pen.); Torbinski (yellow card) 25'; Zotov 63'; Danchenko (yellow card) 83'; Kostyukov (yellow card) 90+2'	Stadium: Central Stadium; Attendance: 11,778; Referee: Evgeny Turbin

13 April 2019 23	Arsenal Tula	0 – 0	Ural Yekaterinburg	Tula
16:00 YEKT (UTC+5)	Gorbatenko (yellow card) 30'; Álvarez (yellow card) 90+1'	Report	Boumal (yellow card) 37'; Yegorychev (yellow card) 58'; Merkulov (red card) 76'; Pogrebnyak (yellow card) 83'; Haroyan (yellow card) 84'	Stadium: Arsenal Stadium; Attendance: 10,156; Referee: Vitali Meshkov

21 April 2019 24	Ural Yekaterinburg	2 – 1	Rubin Kazan	Yekaterinburg
18:30 YEKT (UTC+5)	Yegorychev 1'; Bicfalvi 85'	Report	Poloz 4'; Bayramyan (yellow card) 11'; Stepanov (yellow card) 19'; Bukharov (yellow card) 81'	Stadium: Central Stadium; Attendance: 12,321; Referee: Nikolay Voloshin

25 April 2019 25	Krylia Sovetov	0 – 1	Ural Yekaterinburg	Samara
20:30 YEKT (UTC+5)	Vučićević (yellow card) 42'; Samardžić (yellow card) 53'; Ananidze (yellow card) 76'	Report	Boumal (yellow card) 8'; El Kabir 61' (pen.); Hodzyur (yellow card) 87'; Yemelyanov (yellow card) 90+5'	Stadium: Samara Arena; Attendance: 11,203; Referee: Aleksei Matyunin

28 April 2019 26	Ufa	4 – 1	Ural Yekaterinburg	Ufa
13:30 YEKT (UTC+5)	Vombergar 22'; Vaněk 52' (pen.); Igboun 79', 90+1'	Report	Bicfalvi 16'; Bryzgalov (red card) 58'	Stadium: Neftyanik Stadium; Attendance: 7,156; Referee: Mikhail Vilkov

4 May 2019 27	Ural Yekaterinburg	0 – 1	Spartak Moscow	Yekaterinburg
16:00 YEKT (UTC+5)	Boumal (yellow card) 57'; Yegorychev (yellow card) 67'	Report	Yeshchenko (yellow card) 57'; Guliyev (yellow card) 64'; Fernando 82'	Stadium: Central Stadium; Attendance: 25,733; Referee: Kirill Levnikov

10 May 2019 28	Orenburg	2 – 2	Ural Yekaterinburg	Orenburg
13:30 YEKT (UTC+5)	Terekhov (yellow card) 55'; Malykh (yellow card) 60'; Miškić (yellow card) 65'; Sutormin 72'; Galadzhan 87' (yellow card) 90+4'; Popović (yellow card) 90+6'	Report	Aratore (yellow card) 42'; Oyewole 51' (o.g.); Pogrebnyak 90+6'	Stadium: Gazovik Stadium; Attendance: 4,236; Referee: Aleksei Eskov

19 May 2019 29	Ural Yekaterinburg	2 – 2	Lokomotiv Moscow	Yekaterinburg
13:30 YEKT (UTC+5)	Panyukov 39'; Guilherme 46' (o.g.); Strandberg (yellow card) 64' (yellow-red card) 66'; Boumal (yellow card) 90+3'	Report	An.Miranchuk 21', 64' (pen.); Kvaratskhelia (yellow card) 69'	Stadium: Central Stadium; Attendance: 20,647; Referee: Vladimir Moskalyov

26 May 2019 30	Anzhi Makhachkala	0 – 2	Ural Yekaterinburg	Kaspiysk
16:00 YEKT (UTC+5)	Magomedov (yellow card) 78'	Report	Boumal (yellow card) 15'; Pogrebnyak 56'; Bryzgalov 59'	Stadium: Anzhi Arena; Attendance: 2,250; Referee: Evgeny Turbin

==== League table ====
Pos	Team	Pld	W	D	L	GF	GA	GD	Pts
8	Akhmat Grozny	30	11	9	10	29	30	−1	42
9	Rostov	30	10	11	9	25	23	+2	41
10	Ural Yekaterinburg	30	10	8	12	33	45	−12	38
11	Rubin Kazan	30	7	15	8	24	30	−6	36
12	Dynamo Moscow	30	6	15	9	28	28	0	33

Updated to match(es) played on 26 May 2019. Source: Russian Premier League, Soccerway
Rules for classification: 1) Points; 2) Head-to-head points; 3) Head-to-head matches won; 4) Head-to-head goal difference; 5) Head-to-head goals scored; 6) Head-to-head away goals; 7) Matches won; 8) Goal difference; 9) Goals scored; 10) Away goals scored; 11) Play-off.

=== Russian Cup ===
25 September 2018 Round of 32	Neftekhimik Nizhnekamsk	2 – 3	Ural Yekaterinburg	Nizhnekamsk
20:00 YEKT (UTC+5)	Babyr 63'; Morozov 86'	Report	Bavin 42'; Haroyan (yellow card) 45'; Morozov 52' (o.g.); Zhigulyov 60'	Stadium: Neftekhimik Stadium; Attendance: 2,000; Referee: Igor Nizovtsev

31 October 2018 Round of 16	Ural Yekaterinburg	2 – 0 (a.e.t.)	Nizhny Novgorod	Yekaterinburg
19:00 YEKT (UTC+5)	Dimitrov 103'; Yevseyev 120+1'	Report	Čirjak (yellow card) 33'; Goglichidze (yellow card) 81'; Abazov (yellow card) 105' (yellow-red card) 108'; Khripkov (yellow card) 109'	Stadium: SKB-Bank Arena; Attendance: 3,528; Referee: Evgeny Turbin

5 December 2018 Quarterfinal 1st leg	Spartak Moscow	1 – 1	Ural Yekaterinburg	Moscow
19:30 MSK (UTC+3)	Kutepov (yellow card) 21'; Kombarov (yellow card) 40'; Hanni 48'; Glushakov (yellow card) 55'	Report	Bavin (yellow card) 13'; Yegorychev (yellow card) 53'; Ilyin 67'; El Kabir (yellow card) 90+2'	Stadium: Otkritie Arena; Attendance: 9,333; Referee: Vasiliy Kazartsev

7 March 2019 Quarterfinal 2nd leg	Ural Yekaterinburg	1 – 0 (2 – 1 agg.)	Spartak Moscow	Yekaterinburg
19:00 YEKT (UTC+5)	Strandberg (yellow card) 24'; Bicfalvi 34'; Kulakov (yellow card) 60'; Palyakow (yellow card) 71'; Hodzyur (yellow card) 84'	Report	Rasskazov (yellow card) 40'; Melgarejo (yellow card) 44'; Zobnin (yellow card) 90+4'	Stadium: Central Stadium; Attendance: 18,292; Referee: Mikhail Vilkov

3 April 2019 Semifinal 1st leg	Ural Yekaterinburg	1 – 0	Arsenal Tula	Yekaterinburg
19:00 YEKT (UTC+5)	Panyukov 17'; Boumal (red card) 61'; Palyakow (yellow card) 83'; Strandberg (yellow card) 85'	Report	Mohammed (yellow card) 44'; Grigalava (red card) 85'; Berkhamov (yellow card) 90'	Stadium: Central Stadium; Attendance: 12,304; Referee: Aleksei Eskov

15 May 2019 Semifinal 2nd leg	Arsenal Tula	2 – 2 (2 – 3 agg.)	Ural Yekaterinburg	Tula
21:00 YEKT (UTC+5)	Belyayev (yellow card) 23'; Gorbatenko (yellow card) 45+4'; Haroyan 58' (o.g.); Mirzov 67'; Álvarez (yellow card) 90+2'	Report	Bicfalvi 1' (red card) 34'; El Kabir (penalty missed) 24' 24'; Aratore (yellow card) 45+4'; Yemelyanov (yellow card) 62'	Stadium: Arsenal Stadium; Attendance: 12,850; Referee: Sergei Karasev

==== Final ====
22 May 2019	Lokomotiv Moscow	1 – 0	Ural Yekaterinburg	Samara
20:30 YEKT (UTC+5)	Barinov 27' (yellow card) 40'; Guilherme (yellow card) 90+2'	Report	Pogrebnyak (yellow card) 59'; Merkulov (yellow card) 82'; Yemelyanov (yellow card) 87'	Stadium: Samara Arena; Attendance: 38,018; Referee: Sergey Lapochkin

== Squad statistics ==
As of match played 26 May 2019

=== Appearances and goals ===
No.	Pos	Nat	Player	Total		Premier League		Russian Cup	
No.	Pos	Nat	Player	Apps	Goals	Apps	Goals	Apps	Goals
3	DF	(Armenia) ARM	Varazdat Haroyan	21	1	12+4	1	4+1	0
4	DF	(Russia) RUS	Sergei Bryzgalov	21	1	13+3	1	3+2	0
5	DF	(Serbia) SRB	Dominik Dinga	2	0	1+1	0	0	0
6	DF	(Slovenia) SLO	Gregor Balažic	17	0	17	0	0	0
7	DF	(Russia) RUS	Aleksandr Dantsev	3	0	1+2	0	0	0
8	DF	(Norway) NOR	Stefan Strandberg	13	0	10	0	3	0
10	MF	(Romania) ROU	Eric Bicfalvi	31	8	25+1	6	5	2
11	FW	(Russia) RUS	Vladimir Ilyin	26	2	12+8	1	4+2	1
13	MF	(Cameroon) CMR	Petrus Boumal	27	0	22+1	0	4	0
14	MF	(Russia) RUS	Yuri Bavin	15	2	7+3	1	3+2	1
15	DF	(Ukraine) UKR	Denys Kulakov	34	1	28	1	6	0
17	MF	(Bulgaria) BUL	Nikolay Dimitrov	31	6	26+1	5	4	1
18	MF	(Russia) RUS	Dzhamaldin Khodzhaniyazov	2	0	1	0	1	0
19	DF	(Belarus) BLR	Dzyanis Palyakow	13	0	10+1	0	2	0
20	FW	(Russia) RUS	Andrei Panyukov	26	7	15+6	6	3+2	1
21	MF	(Switzerland) SUI	Marco Aratore	24	0	9+10	0	2+3	0
26	MF	(Russia) RUS	Mingiyan Beveyev	1	0	0	0	1	0
27	DF	(Russia) RUS	Mikhail Merkulov	34	0	27+1	0	6	0
31	GK	(Ukraine) UKR	Yaroslav Hodzyur	36	0	30	0	6	0
44	MF	(Russia) RUS	Andrei Yegorychev	25	1	12+8	1	4+1	0
57	MF	(Russia) RUS	Artyom Fidler	15	0	9+4	0	2	0
58	MF	(Netherlands) NED	Othman El Kabir	35	4	24+4	3	7	1
70	MF	(Russia) RUS	Ilya Zhigulyov	7	1	2+3	0	1+1	1
77	GK	(Russia) RUS	Oleg Baklov	1	0	0	0	1	0
88	FW	(Russia) RUS	Pavel Pogrebnyak	14	3	9+2	3	3	0
92	MF	(Russia) RUS	Roman Yemelyanov	15	0	7+5	0	2+1	0
94	MF	(Russia) RUS	Anatoli Katrich	1	0	0+1	0	0	0
Players away from the club on loan:
79	FW	(Russia) RUS	Artyom Yusupov	4	0	0+3	0	0+1	0
Players who left Ural Yekaterinburg during the season:
8	MF	(Russia) RUS	Alexey Yevseyev	6	1	1+4	0	0+1	1
9	MF	(Georgia (country)) GEO	Giorgi Chanturia	1	0	0	0	0+1	0

=== Goal scorers ===
Place	Position	Nation	Number	Name	Premier League	Russian Cup	Total
1	MF	(Romania)	10	Eric Bicfalvi	6	2	8
2	FW	(Russia)	20	Andrei Panyukov	6	1	7
3	MF	(Bulgaria)	17	Nikolay Dimitrov	5	1	6
4				Own goal	4	1	5
5	MF	(Netherlands)	58	Othman El Kabir	3	1	4
6	FW	(Russia)	88	Pavel Pogrebnyak	3	0	3
7	FW	(Russia)	11	Vladimir Ilyin	1	1	2
8	MF	(Russia)	14	Yuri Bavin	1	0	1
8	DF	(Armenia)	3	Varazdat Haroyan	1	0	1
8	DF	(Ukraine)	15	Denys Kulakov	1	0	1
8	MF	(Russia)	44	Andrei Yegorychev	1	0	1
8	DF	(Russia)	4	Sergei Bryzgalov	1	0	1
8	DF	(Russia)	14	Yuri Bavin	0	1	1
8	MF	(Russia)	70	Ilya Zhigulyov	0	1	1
8	MF	(Russia)	8	Alexey Yevseyev	0	1	1
				TOTALS	33	10	43

=== Disciplinary record ===
Number	Nation	Position	Name	Premier League		Russian Cup		Total	
Number	Nation	Position	Name	Yellow card	Red card	Yellow card	Red card	Yellow card	Red card
3	(Armenia)	DF	Varazdat Haroyan	6	0	1	0	7	0
4	(Russia)	DF	Sergei Bryzgalov	2	1	0	0	2	1
5	(Serbia)	DF	Dominik Dinga	1	0	0	0	1	0
6	(Slovenia)	DF	Gregor Balažic	2	0	0	0	2	0
8	(Norway)	DF	Stefan Strandberg	3	1	2	0	5	1
10	(Romania)	MF	Eric Bicfalvi	3	0	0	1	3	1
11	(Russia)	FW	Vladimir Ilyin	4	0	0	0	4	0
13	(Cameroon)	MF	Petrus Boumal	11	0	0	1	11	1
14	(Russia)	MF	Yuri Bavin	1	0	1	0	2	0
15	(Ukraine)	DF	Denys Kulakov	3	0	1	0	4	0
17	(Bulgaria)	MF	Nikolay Dimitrov	2	0	0	0	2	0
19	(Belarus)	DF	Dzyanis Palyakow	0	0	2	0	2	0
20	(Russia)	FW	Andrei Panyukov	2	0	0	0	2	0
21	(Switzerland)	MF	Marco Aratore	1	0	1	0	2	0
27	(Russia)	DF	Mikhail Merkulov	0	1	1	0	1	1
31	(Ukraine)	GK	Yaroslav Hodzyur	1	0	1	0	2	0
44	(Russia)	MF	Andrei Yegorychev	3	0	1	0	4	0
57	(Russia)	MF	Artyom Fidler	4	1	0	0	4	1
58	(Netherlands)	MF	Othman El Kabir	3	0	1	0	4	0
88	(Russia)	FW	Pavel Pogrebnyak	2	0	1	0	3	0
92	(Russia)	MF	Roman Yemelyanov	3	0	2	0	5	0
Players who left Ural Yekaterinburg during the season:
8	(Russia)	MF	Alexey Yevseyev	3	1	0	0	3	1
			TOTALS	60	5	15	2	75	7
