= Dominik Dinga =

Serbian footballer

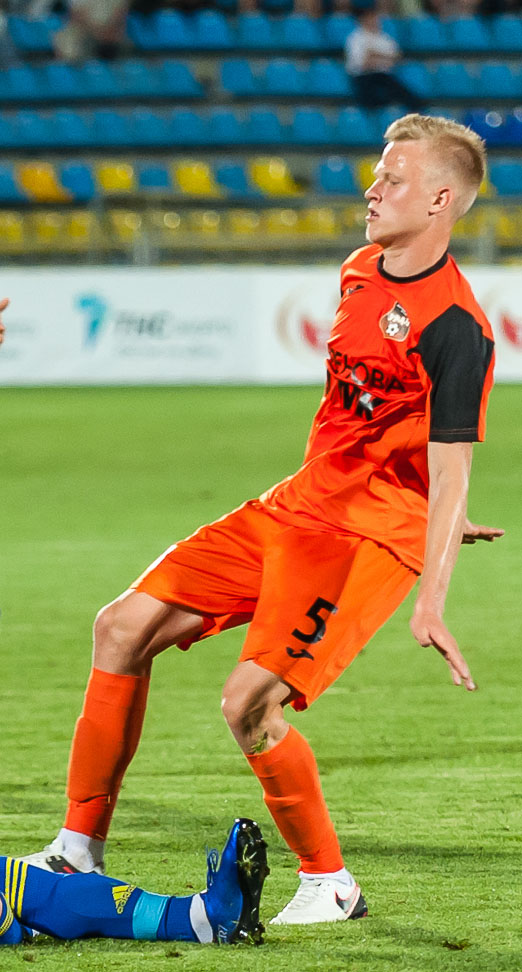
- Dinga with Ural in 2016

Personal information
- Date of birth: 7 April 1998 (age 28)
- Place of birth: Novi Sad, FR Yugoslavia
- Height: 1.84 m (6 ft 0 in)
- Position: Centre-back

Team information
- Current team: Voždovac
- Number: 6

Youth career
- Slavija Pivnice
- Mladost Backi Petrovac
- 2010–2014: Hajduk Kula
- 2014–2015: Vojvodina

Senior career*
| Years | Team | Apps | (Gls) |
| 2015 | Vojvodina | 6 | (0) |
| 2016–2022 | Ural Yekaterinburg | 26 | (0) |
| 2019–2020 | → Partizan (loan) | 1 | (0) |
| 2020–2021 | → Dinamo Minsk (loan) | 39 | (1) |
| 2022 | Ordabasy | 5 | (0) |
| 2023 | Shakhtyor Soligorsk | 10 | (0) |
| 2024 | Naftan Novopolotsk | 4 | (0) |
| 2024–2025 | Petržalka | 17 | (0) |
| 2025– | Voždovac | 13 | (0) |

International career^{‡}
| 2013–2014 | Serbia U16 | 7 | (0) |
| 2014–2015 | Serbia U17 | 14 | (0) |
| 2015–2016 | Serbia U18 | 7 | (0) |
| 2016–2017 | Serbia U19 | 11 | (2) |
- * Club domestic league appearances and goals as of 14 May 2026 ‡ National team caps and goals as of 28 March 2017

Dominik Dinga (Serbian Cyrillic: Доминик Динга; born 7 April 1998) is a Serbian professional footballer who plays as a centre-back for Voždovac.

== Club career ==
=== Vojvodina ===
Dinga was a member of Hajduk Kula until summer 2014, when he moved to Vojvodina. After season with youth team, he started his senior career from 2015–16 season. He scored his first goal, in first friendly match for the first team. Dinga made his official debut for Vojvodina's senior team in first qualifying round for UEFA Europa League, in pair with Igor Đurić in first match against MTK, ended with 0:0 result. He also made his Serbian SuperLiga in 1st fixture, against Čukarički, when he was substituted in at the half-time for Igor Đurić. On 19 February 2016, Dinga terminated the contract with Vojvodina.

=== Ural ===
Dinga signed a long-term contract with the Russian club FC Ural Sverdlovsk Oblast on 8 April 2016. He would not be able to play for the club in the 2015–16 Russian Premier League games as the transfer window was already closed at the time. He made his official debut for club in the 2nd fixture match of the 2016–17 Russian Premier League, against Rostov, played on 7 August 2016.

After remaining on the bench in all the 2022 Ural games after returning from loan, Dinga was released from his contract with Ural by mutual consent on 17 June 2022.

=== Partizan ===
On 14 June 2019, he joined FK Partizan on loan.

=== Dinamo Minsk ===
On 15 February 2020, he joined Dinamo Minsk on loan till the end of season. His loan was extended for the 2021 season. He returned to Ural at the end of the 2021 season.

== International career ==
Dinga joined Vojvodina, as a captain of Serbia U17 national selection. Previously, he was also a member of Under 16 national team. In August 2016, Dinga was called into Serbia U19 squad for memorial tournament "Stevan Vilotić - Ćele", where he debuted as a captain in opening match against United States. In 2nd match of the same tournament, he scored a goal against France. After Serbia beat Israel in the final match, Dinga was nominated for the best player of the tournament. Dinga also scored a goal in a match against Moldova, played on 9 November 2016.

== Personal life ==
Dinga was born in Novi Sad to an ethnic Slovak family but he was raised in Pivnice, Bačka Palanka.

== Career statistics ==
=== Club ===
As of 21 May 2022

| Club | Season | League | | | Cup | | Continental | | Other | | Total | |
| Club | Season | Division | Apps | Goals | Apps | Goals | Apps | Goals | Apps | Goals | Apps | Goals |
|---|---|---|---|---|---|---|---|---|---|---|---|---|
| Vojvodina | 2015–16 | Serbian SuperLiga | 6 | 0 | 1 | 0 | 1 (Note: Appearances in the UEFA Europa League) | 0 | – | | 8 | 0 |
| Ural Yekaterinburg | 2016–17 | RPL | 20 | 0 | 2 | 0 | – | | – | | 22 | 0 |
| Ural Yekaterinburg | 2017–18 | RPL | 4 | 0 | 1 | 0 | – | | 1 (Note: Appearances in the FNL Cup) | 0 | 6 | 0 |
| Ural Yekaterinburg | 2018–19 | RPL | 2 | 0 | 0 | 0 | – | | 3 | 0 | 5 | 0 |
| Ural Yekaterinburg | 2021–22 | RPL | 0 | 0 | – | | – | | – | | 0 | 0 |
| Ural Yekaterinburg | Total | | 26 | 0 | 3 | 0 | 0 | 0 | 4 | 0 | 33 | 0 |
| Partizan (loan) | 2019–20 | Serbian SuperLiga | 1 | 0 | 1 | 0 | 0 | 0 | – | | 2 | 0 |
| Dinamo Minsk (loan) | 2020 | BPL | 25 | 1 | 3 | 0 | 1 | 0 | – | | 29 | 1 |
| Dinamo Minsk (loan) | 2021 | BPL | 14 | 0 | 0 | 0 | – | | – | | 14 | 0 |
| Dinamo Minsk (loan) | Total | | 39 | 1 | 3 | 0 | 1 | 0 | 0 | 0 | 43 | 1 |
| Career total | | | 72 | 1 | 8 | 0 | 2 | 0 | 4 | 0 | 86 | 1 |
