= Petrus Boumal =

Cameroonian footballer

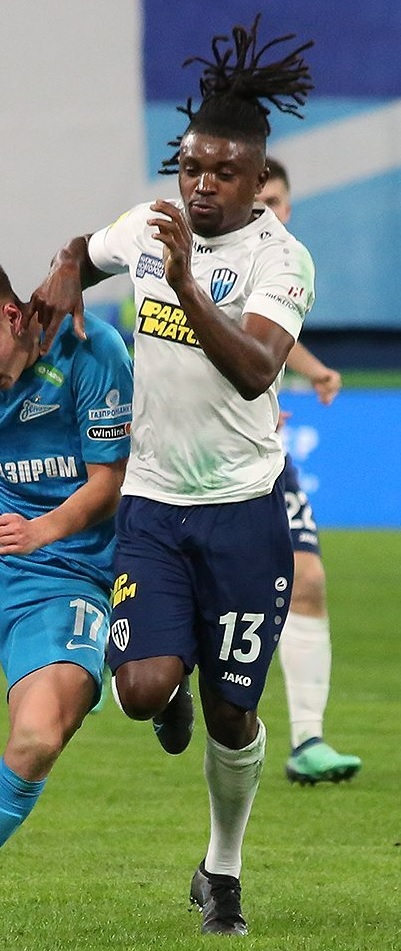
- Boumal playing for Nizhny Novgorod in 2021

Personal information
- Full name: Petrus Boumal Mayega
- Date of birth: 20 April 1993 (age 33)
- Place of birth: Yaoundé, Cameroon
- Height: 1.73 m (5 ft 8 in)
- Position: Defensive midfielder

Youth career
- 2006–2011: Sochaux

Senior career*
Years	Team	Apps	(Gls)
2010–2014	Sochaux B	68	(3)
2011–2014	Sochaux	8	(0)
2014–2016	Litex Lovech	41	(1)
2016	Litex Lovech II	5	(0)
2016	CSKA Sofia II	1	(1)
2016–2017	CSKA Sofia	22	(2)
2017–2020	Ural Yekaterinburg	58	(0)
2020–2021	BB Erzurumspor	31	(0)
2021	Nizhny Novgorod	3	(0)
2022–2023	Újpest	36	(0)
2023–2024	Al Bataeh	20	(2)
2024–2025	Al Urooba	23	(0)

International career^{‡}
2013	Cameroon U-20	2	(0)
2017–2019	Cameroon	2	(0)
- * Club domestic league appearances and goals as of 14 December 2024 ‡ National team caps and goals as of 11 March 2026

Petrus Boumal Mayega (born 20 April 1993) is a Cameroonian footballer who plays as a defensive midfielder.

== Career ==
=== Sochaux ===
Boumal joined Sochaux in 2006. In 2010, he made his debut for Sochaux's B team against Raon-l'Etape. A year later he was called to the first team and after some matches on the bench he made his Ligue 1 debut in a 0–0 away draw against Dijon on 3 December 2011.

=== Litex Lovech ===
Following Sochaux being relegated from the first division, Boumal joined the Bulgarian side Litex Lovech on 2 July 2014.

=== CSKA Sofia ===
Boumal signed a contract with CSKA Sofia in September 2016.

=== Ural Yekaterinburg ===
On 18 August 2017, Boumal signed with Russian club Ural Yekaterinburg. He left Ural on 3 August 2020.

=== Nizhny Novgorod ===
On 7 September 2021, he returned to the Russian Premier League and signed a two-year contract with FC Nizhny Novgorod. His contract was terminated in early December 2021. In his last game for Nizhny Novgorod he was sent off in the first half after receiving two cautions, following the game he had a disagreement with the team manager Aleksandr Kerzhakov.

=== Újpest ===
On 15 February 2022, Boumal signed with Újpest in Hungary.

=== Al Bataeh ===
On 29 June 2023, Boumal signed with Al Bataeh in UAE.

=== Al Urooba ===
On 14 August 2024, Boumal signed with Al Urooba in UAE.

== International career ==
Boumal made his debut for the Cameroon national football team in a 2–2 2018 FIFA World Cup qualification tie with Zambia on 11 November 2017.

== Club statistics ==
=== Club ===
As of 13 May 2022

Club	Season	Division	League		Cup		Continental		Other		Total	
Club	Season	Division	Apps	Goals	Apps	Goals	Apps	Goals	Apps	Goals	Apps	Goals
Sochaux B	2010–11	National 2	15	1	–		–		–		15	1
Sochaux B	2011–12	National 2	22	2	–		–		–		22	2
Sochaux B	2012–13	National 2	17	0	–		–		–		17	0
Sochaux B	2013–14	National 2	14	0	–		–		–		14	0
Sochaux B	Total		68	3	0	0	0	0	0	0	68	3
Sochaux	2011–12	Ligue 1	1	0	–		–		1 (Note: Appearance in Coupe de la Ligue)	0	2	0
Sochaux	2012–13	Ligue 1	0	0	1	0	–		–		1	0
Sochaux	2013–14	Ligue 1	7	0	1	0	–		1	0	9	0
Sochaux	Total		8	0	4	0	0	0	0	0	12	0
Litex Lovech	2014–15	A Group	25	0	4	0	2 (Note: Appearances in the UEFA Europa League)	0	–		31	0
Litex Lovech	2015–16	A Group	16	1	4	0	2	0	–		22	1
Litex Lovech	Total		39	1	5	0	4	0	0	0	48	1
Litex Lovech II	2015–16	B Group	5	0	–		–		–		5	0
CSKA Sofia	2016–17	First League	22	2	4	0	–		–		26	2
CSKA Sofia II	2016–17	B Group	1	1	–		–		–		1	1
Ural Yekaterinburg	2017–18	RPL	19	0	1	0	–		4 (Note: Appearance in the FNL Cup)	0	24	0
Ural Yekaterinburg	2018–19	RPL	23	0	4	0	–		2	0	29	0
Ural Yekaterinburg	2019–20	RPL	16	0	1	0	–		1	0	18	0
Ural Yekaterinburg	Total		58	0	6	0	0	0	7	0	71	0
BB Erzurumspor	2020–21	Süper Lig	31	0	2	0	–		–		33	0
Nizhny Novgorod	2021–22	RPL	3	0	0	0	–		–		3	0
Újpest	2021–22	NB I	12	0	1	0	–		–		13	0
Career total			249	7	23	0	4	0	9	0	285	7
