= Pyotr Khrustovsky =

Russian footballer

Personal information
- Full name: Pyotr Viktorovich Khrustovsky
- Date of birth: 31 May 1979
- Place of birth: Kamyshin, Russian SFSR
- Date of death: 5 July 2003 (aged 24)
- Place of death: Volgograd Oblast, Russia
- Height: 1.80 m (5 ft 11 in)
- Position: Forward

Youth career
- SDYuSShOR-2 Kamyshin

Senior career*
Years	Team	Apps	(Gls)
1995–1997	Energiya Kamyshin	23	(2)
1997	→ Energiya-d Kamyshin (loan)	12	(1)
1998	Neftekhimik Nizhnekamsk	36	(5)
1999	Zhemchuzhina Sochi	14	(3)
1999	Uralmash Yekaterinburg	12	(5)
2000	Rubin Kazan	20	(1)
2001	Tekstilshchik Kamyshin (amateur)		
2001–2003	Ural Sverdlovsk Oblast	62	(23)
- * Club domestic league appearances and goals

Pyotr Viktorovich Khrustovsky (Russian: Пётр Викторович Хрустовский; 31 May 1979 – 5 July 2003) was a Russian football player.

He died in a car crash on 5 July 2003. His last club, FC Ural Sverdlovsk Oblast, has retired his number 23.
