= Denys Kulakov =

Ukrainian footballer

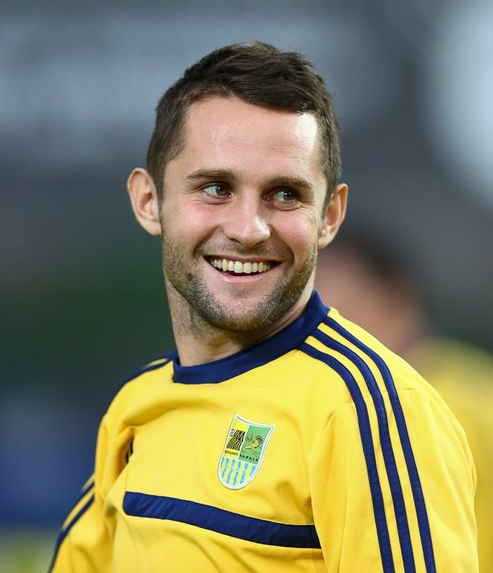
- Kulakov in 2014

Personal information
- Full name: Denys Yermylovych Kulakov
- Date of birth: 1 May 1986 (age 40)
- Place of birth: Izium, Kharkiv Oblast, Ukrainian SSR
- Height: 1.82 m (6 ft 0 in)
- Position: Right-back

Team information
- Current team: Pyunik (Sporting Director)

Youth career
- Shakhtar Donetsk Youth

Senior career*
Years	Team	Apps	(Gls)
2003	Shakhtar-3 Donetsk	7	(0)
2003–2005	Shakhtar-2 Donetsk	44	(3)
2004–2008	Shakhtar Donetsk	2	(1)
2006–2007	→ Illichivets Mariupol (loan)	27	(1)
2007–2008	→ Vorskla Poltava (loan)	18	(0)
2008–2011	Vorskla Poltava	85	(5)
2011–2014	Dnipro Dnipropetrovsk	39	(0)
2014–2015	Metalist Kharkiv	16	(1)
2015–2024	Ural Yekaterinburg	230	(1)

International career
2005	Ukraine U-19	5	(1)
2006–2007	Ukraine U-21	3	(0)
2010–2011	Ukraine	2	(0)
- * Club domestic league appearances and goals

Denys Yermylovych Kulakov (Ukrainian: Дени́с Єрми́лович Кулако́в, born 1 May 1986) is a Ukrainian former professional footballer who played as a right-back.

== Club career ==
On 2 February 2022, Kulakov extended his contract with Ural Yekaterinburg to June 2023. On 15 March 2022, Kulakov's contract with Ural was suspended until 30 June 2022 due to the 2022 Russian invasion of Ukraine. On 6 June 2023, Kulakov extended his contract with Ural for the 2023–24 season. In June 2024 he finally left FC Ural after 9 years with the team.

On 18 January 2025, Pyunik announced the appointment of Kulakov as the club's sporting director.

== Career statistics ==
=== Club ===
As of match played 1 June 2024

Club	Season	League			Cup		Continental		Other		Total	
Club	Season	Division	Apps	Goals	Apps	Goals	Apps	Goals	Apps	Goals	Apps	Goals
Shakhtar-3 Donetsk	2003–04	Ukrainian Second League	7	0	–		–		–		7	0
Shakhtar-2 Donetsk	2003–04	Ukrainian First League	20	2	–		–		–		20	2
Shakhtar-2 Donetsk	2004–05	Ukrainian First League	12	1	–		–		–		12	1
Shakhtar-2 Donetsk	2005–06	Ukrainian First League	12	0	–		–		–		12	0
Shakhtar-2 Donetsk	Total		44	3	0	0	0	0	0	0	44	3
Shakhtar Donetsk	2003–04	Ukrainian Premier League	1	1	0	0	0	0	–		1	1
Shakhtar Donetsk	2004–05	Ukrainian Premier League	1	0	0	0	1	0	–		2	0
Shakhtar Donetsk	2005–06	Ukrainian Premier League	0	0	1	0	0	0	–		1	0
Shakhtar Donetsk	Total		2	1	1	0	1	0	0	0	4	1
Illychivets Mariupol	2005–06	Ukrainian Premier League	6	0	2	0	–		–		8	0
Illychivets Mariupol	2006–07	Ukrainian Premier League	21	1	4	0	–		–		25	1
Illychivets Mariupol	Total		27	1	6	0	0	0	0	0	33	1
Vorskla Poltava	2007–08	Ukrainian Premier League	18	0	2	0	–		–		20	0
Vorskla Poltava	2008–09	Ukrainian Premier League	26	1	5	1	–		–		31	2
Vorskla Poltava	2009–10	Ukrainian Premier League	29	3	1	0	2	0	1 (Note: One appearance in Ukrainian Super Cup)	0	33	3
Vorskla Poltava	2010–11	Ukrainian Premier League	30	1	1	0	–		–		31	1
Vorskla Poltava	Total		103	5	9	1	2	0	1	0	115	6
Dnipro	2011–12	Ukrainian Premier League	20	0	1	0	1	0	–		22	0
Dnipro	2012–13	Ukrainian Premier League	9	0	0	0	0	0	–		9	0
Dnipro	2013–14	Ukrainian Premier League	10	0	0	0	6	0	–		16	0
Dnipro	Total		39	0	1	0	7	0	0	0	47	0
Metalist Kharkiv	2014–15	Ukrainian Premier League	16	1	3	1	7	0	–		26	2
Ural Yekaterinburg	2015–16	Russian Premier League	26	0	1	0	–		–		27	0
Ural Yekaterinburg	2016–17	Russian Premier League	30	0	2	0	–		–		32	0
Ural Yekaterinburg	2017–18	Russian Premier League	30	0	1	0	–		4 (Note: Appearances in the FNL Cup)	0	35	0
Ural Yekaterinburg	2018–19	Russian Premier League	28	1	6	0	–		2	0	36	1
Ural Yekaterinburg	2019–20	Russian Premier League	28	0	3	0	–		1	0	32	0
Ural Yekaterinburg	2020–21	Russian Premier League	25	0	3	0	–		–		28	0
Ural Yekaterinburg	2021–22	Russian Premier League	18	0	1	0	–		–		19	0
Ural Yekaterinburg	2022–23	Russian Premier League	19	0	10	0	–		–		29	0
Ural Yekaterinburg	2023–24	Russian Premier League	26	0	6	0	–		2 (Note: Appearances in the relegation play-offs)	0	34	0
Ural Yekaterinburg	Total		230	1	33	0	0	0	9	0	272	1
Career total			468	12	53	2	17	0	10	0	548	14
