= 2017 A Lyga =

A Lyga
- Season: 2017
- Champions: Sūduva
- Champions League: Sūduva
- Europa League: Žalgiris; Trakai; Stumbras
- Matches: 127
- Goals: 339 (2.67 per match)
- Top goalscorer: Darvydas Šernas (18 goals)
- Biggest home win: Žalgiris 5–0 Utenis (2 August 2017); Žalgiris 5–0 Jonava (16 August 2017); Sūduva 5–0 Kauno Žalgiris (11 October 2017)
- Biggest away win: Jonava 0–5 Sūduva (17 October 2017)
- Highest scoring: Jonava 5–2 Kauno Žalgiris (1 April 2017); Žalgiris 5–2 Utenis (15 November 2017)
- Longest winning run: 11 games Sūduva
- Longest unbeaten run: 13 games Sūduva
- Longest winless run: 13 games Kauno Žalgiris
- Longest losing run: 6 games Kauno Žalgiris
- Highest attendance: 4,489; Sūduva v Žalgiris (19 November 2017)
- Lowest attendance: 70; Kauno Žalgiris v Sūduva (14 October 2017); Stumbras v Utenis (22 October 2017)
- Total attendance: 60,211
- Average attendance: 478
- All statistics correct as of 19 November 2017.

The 2017 A Lyga was the 28th season of the A Lyga, the top-tier association football league of Lithuania. The season began on 3 March 2017 and ended on 19 November 2017.

All eight teams from the previous season remained and competed in the league, while Žalgiris Vilnius began the season as defending champions having won fourth consecutive league title last year.

Sūduva Marijampolė won the championship for the first time in their 96-year history, becoming the eighth club to win the league since its creation in 1991.

== Teams ==
A total of eight teams should have contested the league, including six sides from the previous season, one promoted from the 2016 LFF I Lyga and the winners of the 2016 A Lyga Relegation play-offs.

Utenis managed to withstand against I Lyga runners-up Palanga in the play-offs and for the 3rd consecutive season continued to play in the A Lyga.

2015 LFF I Lyga champions FK Lietava changed they name to FK Jonava after received permission from Lithuanian Football Federation.

Kauno Žalgiris were relegated at the end of 2016 season and replaced by 2016 LFF I Lyga champions Šilas. It was going to be a debut in the top tier for Kazlų Rūda team.

Before the beginning of the season, newcomers Šilas were accused of match-fixing during a 2017 Virsligas Winter Cup match with FS METTA. Soon after Lithuanian Football Federation started an investigation to determine validity of these claims. At the time all club trainings and friendly matches were revoked. On 24 February, club chairman Audrius Raškauskas announced, that players received a permission to look for the new clubs while Šilas most probably will withdraw from the league into lower divisions of Lithuanian football.

On 24 February 2017 Lithuanian Football Federation announced that Šilas withdrew from the league and will be replaced by last year participants Kauno Žalgiris, who were only non-participating team, which received a valid license for A Lyga.

=== Clubs and locations ===
Locations of the 2017 A Lyga teams

The following teams were competing in the 2017 championship:

Club	Location	Stadium	Turf	Capacity	2016 position
Atlantas	Klaipėda	Central Stadium of Klaipėda	Natural	4,428	4th
Atlantas	Klaipėda	Klaipėda Artificial Football Pitch	Artificial	1,000	4th
Jonava	Jonava	Central Stadium of Jonava	Natural	1,008	6th
Jonava	Jonava	Jonava Artificial Football Pitch	Artificial	558	6th
Kauno Žalgiris	Kaunas	Darius and Girėnas Stadium	Natural	9,180	8th
Kauno Žalgiris	Kaunas	NFA Stadium	Artificial	500	8th
Stumbras	Kaunas	Darius and Girėnas Stadium	Natural	9,180	5th
Stumbras	Kaunas	NFA Stadium	Artificial	500	5th
Sūduva	Marijampolė	ARVI Football Arena	Natural	6,250	3rd
Sūduva	Marijampolė	ARVI Football Indoor Arena	Artificial	2,660	3rd
Trakai	Vilnius	LFF Stadium	Artificial	5,067	2nd
Trakai	Vilnius	Sportima Arena	Artificial	3,157	2nd
Utenis	Utena	Utenis Stadium	Natural	3,073	7th
Utenis	Visaginas (Note: Stadium location)	Visaginas Artificial Football Pitch	Artificial	212	7th
Žalgiris	Vilnius	LFF Stadium	Artificial	5,067	1st
Žalgiris	Vilnius	Sportima Arena	Artificial	3,157	1st

=== Personnel and kits ===
Note: Flags indicate national team as has been defined under FIFA eligibility rules. Players and Managers may hold more than one non-FIFA nationality.

Team	Head coach	Captain	Kit manufacturer	Shirt sponsor
Atlantas	(Lithuania) Igoris Pankratjevas	(Lithuania) Andrius Bartkus	Puma	—
Jonava	(Lithuania) Mindaugas Čepas	(Lithuania) Tadas Eliošius	Adidas	—
Kauno Žalgiris	(Northern Ireland) Johnny McKinstry	(Lithuania) Ignas Dedura	Hummel	BC Žalgiris
Stumbras	(Portugal) Mariano Barreto	(Lithuania) Klaidas Janonis	Hummel	Ibumetin
Sūduva	(Kazakhstan) Vladimir Cheburin	(Lithuania) Algis Jankauskas	Joma	Sumeda
Trakai	(Russia) Oleg Vasilenko	(Lithuania) Deividas Česnauskis	Nike	Ecoil
Utenis	(Spain) David Campaña	(Lithuania) Aurimas Tručinskas (Note: Player left the club in the middle of the season.) (Spain) Guille Smitarello	Adidas	Baltijos polistirenas
Žalgiris	(Belarus) Aleksandr Brazevich (interim)	(Lithuania) Egidijus Vaitkūnas	Nike	TOP Sport

=== Managerial changes ===
Team	Outgoing manager	Manner of departure	Date of vacancy	Position in table	Incoming manager	Date of appointment
Kauno Žalgiris	(Lithuania) Laimis Bičkauskas	Resigned	26 October 2016	Pre-season	(Lithuania) Vitalijus Stankevičius	3 January 2017
Jonava	(Lithuania) Robertas Poškus	Sacked	14 December 2016	Pre-season	(Lithuania) Donatas Vencevičius	14 December 2016
Trakai	(Ukraine) Serhiy Kovalets	End of contract	16 December 2016	Pre-season	(Russia) Oleg Vasilenko	19 January 2017
Utenis	(Ukraine) Oleh Boychyshyn	End of caretaker spell	9 January 2017	Pre-season	(Serbia) Zvezdan Milošević	9 January 2017
Utenis	(Serbia) Zvezdan Milošević	Sacked	26 April 2017	5th	(Ukraine) Oleh Boychyshyn (caretaker)	26 April 2017
Kauno Žalgiris	(Lithuania) Vitalijus Stankevičius	Mutual consent	2 May 2017	8th	(Lithuania) Laimis Bičkauskas (caretaker)	2 May 2017
Utenis	(Ukraine) Oleh Boychyshyn	End of caretaker spell	15 May 2017	5th	(Spain) David Campaña	15 May 2017
Atlantas	(Russia) Konstantin Sarsania	Signed by Zenit Saint Petersburg	27 May 2017	4th	(Russia) Sergej Savchenkov (caretaker) (Lithuania) Rimantas Žvingilas (caretaker)	28 May 2017
Atlantas	(Lithuania) Rimantas Žvingilas (Russia) Sergej Savchenkov	End of caretaker spell	21 July 2017	4th	(Lithuania) Igoris Pankratjevas	23 July 2017
Kauno Žalgiris	(Lithuania) Laimis Bičkauskas	End of caretaker spell	21 July 2017	8th	(Northern Ireland) Johnny McKinstry	21 July 2017
Jonava	(Lithuania) Donatas Vencevičius	Sacked	1 August 2017	6th	(Lithuania) Mindaugas Čepas	2 August 2017
Žalgiris	(Lithuania) Valdas Dambrauskas	Resigned	23 October 2017	2nd	(Belarus) Aleksandr Brazevich (interim)	24 October 2017

== Regular season ==
=== Standings ===
Pos	Team	Pld	W	D	L	GF	GA	GD	Pts	Qualification or relegation
1	Sūduva	28	17	8	3	65	28	+37	59	Qualification to Championship round
2	Žalgiris	28	17	7	4	51	22	+29	58	Qualification to Championship round
3	Trakai	28	15	9	4	45	22	+23	54	Qualification to Championship round
4	Atlantas	28	8	9	11	33	33	0	33	Qualification to Championship round
5	Utenis	28	8	8	12	24	41	−17	32	Qualification to Championship round
6	Jonava	28	8	7	13	29	45	−16	31	Qualification to Championship round
7	Stumbras (Note: Stumbras qualified for the Europa League first qualifying round by winning the 2017 Lithuanian Football Cup.) (O)	28	4	10	14	23	42	−19	22	Europa League first qualifying round and relegation play-offs
8	Kauno Žalgiris	28	3	6	19	19	56	−37	15	Relegation to I Lyga cancelled

Source: A Lyga (in Lithuanian), UEFA, Soccerway
Rules for classification: 1) Points; 2) Head-to-head points; 3) Head-to-head goal difference; 4) Head-to-head goals scored; 5) Head-to-head matches won; 6) Goal difference; 7) Goals scored; 8) Matches won.
(O) Play-off winners

=== Results ===
==== First half of season ====
Home \ Away	ATL	JON	KŽA	STU	SŪD	TRA	UTE	ŽAL
Atlantas	—	0–1	3–1	4–1	1–1	1–1	2–2	1–2
Jonava	0–2	—	5–2	1–2	1–4	0–0	1–0	0–2
Kauno Žalgiris	0–1	1–3	—	0–0	0–2	1–1	0–1	2–0
Stumbras	1–1	1–0	3–0	—	1–2	1–1	1–1	1–3
Sūduva	0–0	3–3	3–1	2–0	—	1–1	2–1	0–0
Trakai	4–1	1–0	4–1	1–0	2–0	—	1–0	0–1
Utenis	0–3	1–1	1–0	0–0	2–4	1–0	—	0–4
Žalgiris	1–0	2–1	1–0	4–1	3–1	1–1	0–1	—

Source: A Lyga (in Lithuanian)
Legend: Blue = home team win; Yellow = draw; Red = away team win.

==== Second half of season ====
Home \ Away	ATL	JON	KŽA	STU	SŪD	TRA	UTE	ŽAL
Atlantas	—	0–1	1–1	3–2	1–2	0–1	0–1	1–1
Jonava	2–1	—	2–1	1–1	0–5	1–3	1–3	1–2
Kauno Žalgiris	0–1	1–0	—	0–2	1–5	1–2	1–1	1–1
Stumbras	0–3	0–0	0–1	—	1–3	0–0	0–3	1–1
Sūduva	1–1	1–1	5–0	4–2	—	5–1	2–0	3–0
Trakai	2–0	0–0	5–1	1–0	2–3	—	3–0	2–2
Utenis	1–1	1–2	0–0	1–1	1–0	0–4	—	1–2
Žalgiris	3–0	5–0	3–1	1–0	1–1	0–1	5–0	—

Source: A Lyga (in Lithuanian)
Legend: Blue = home team win; Yellow = draw; Red = away team win.

== Championship round ==
=== Standings ===
Pos	Team	Pld	W	D	L	GF	GA	GD	Pts	Qualification or relegation
1	Sūduva (C)	33	21	8	4	73	31	+42	71	Qualification for the Champions League first qualifying round
2	Žalgiris	33	20	7	6	62	31	+31	67	Qualification for the Europa League first qualifying round
3	Trakai	33	18	10	5	53	27	+26	64	Qualification for the Europa League preliminary round
4	Jonava	33	10	8	15	40	53	−13	38	
5	Atlantas	33	8	12	13	39	43	−4	36	
6	Utenis	33	8	9	16	30	56	−26	33	

Source: A Lyga (in Lithuanian), UEFA, Soccerway
Rules for classification: 1) Points; 2) Head-to-head points; 3) Head-to-head goal difference; 4) Head-to-head goals scored; 5) Head-to-head matches won; 6) Goal difference; 7) Goals scored; 8) Matches won.
(C) Champions

=== Results ===
Home \ Away	ATL	JON	SŪD	TRA	UTE	ŽAL
Atlantas	—	—	—	—	2–2	0–3
Jonava	2–2	—	—	—	3–0	—
Sūduva	1–0	2–1	—	—	—	3–0
Trakai	2–2	2–1	1–0	—	—	—
Utenis	—	—	1–2	1–3	—	—
Žalgiris	—	2–4	—	1–0	5–2	—

Source: A Lyga (in Lithuanian)
Legend: Blue = home team win; Yellow = draw; Red = away team win.

== Relegation play-offs ==
The 7th placed team faced the runners-up of the 2017 LFF I Lyga for a two-legged play-off. The winner on aggregate score after both matches earned entry into the 2018 A Lyga.

=== First leg ===
28 October 2017
18:00 EEST (UTC+3)

Banga	1–2	Stumbras
Krušnauskas 11' (pen.)	Report	Armanavičius 4'; Almeida 67'

Gargždai Stadium, Gargždai, Lithuania
Attendance: 600
Referee: Edmundas Gaigalas

=== Second leg ===
4 November 2017
13:00 EET (UTC+2)

Stumbras	3–0	Banga
Villela 39', 73'; Barauskas 50'	Report

NFA Stadium, Kaunas, Lithuania
Attendance: 200
Referee: Robertas Valikonis

Stumbras won 5–1 on aggregate.

== Positions by round ==
The table lists the positions of teams after each week of matches. In order to preserve chronological progress, any postponed matches are not included in the round at which they were originally scheduled, but added to the full round they were played immediately afterwards. For example, if a match is scheduled for matchday 13, but then postponed and played between days 16 and 17, it will be added to the standings for day 16.

Leader – Qualification to Champions League first qualifying round
Qualification to Europa League first qualifying round
Qualification to Europa League preliminary qualifying round
Qualification to relegation play-offs
Relegation to 2018 I Lyga

Team \ Round	1	2	3	4	5	6	7	8	9	10	11	12	13	14	15	16	17	18	19	20	21	22	23	24	25	26	27	28	29	30	31	32	33
Sūduva	4	1	3	4	2	2	3	3	2	2	2	2	2	2	2	3	3	3	3	3	3	3	3	3	3	2	2	1	1	1	1	1	1
Žalgiris	1	4	1	1	1	1	1	1	1	1	1	1	1	1	1	1	1	1	1	1	1	1	1	1	1	1	1	2	2	2	2	2	2
Trakai	2	2	4	6	5	4	4	4	4	4	4	3	3	3	3	2	2	2	2	2	2	2	2	2	2	3	3	3	3	3	3	3	3
Jonava	3	6	6	3	4	6	6	6	7	6	7	6	5	6	6	6	6	6	6	6	6	7	7	7	7	6	6	6	6	4	4	4	4
Atlantas	7	5	2	2	3	3	2	2	3	3	3	4	4	4	4	4	4	4	4	4	4	4	4	5	4	4	4	4	4	5	5	5	5
Utenis	5	3	5	5	6	5	5	5	5	5	5	5	6	5	5	5	5	5	5	5	5	5	5	4	5	5	5	5	5	6	6	6	6
Stumbras	8	8	8	7	7	7	7	7	6	7	6	7	7	7	7	7	7	7	7	7	7	6	6	6	6	7	7	7					
Kauno Žalgiris	5	7	7	8	8	8	8	8	8	8	8	8	8	8	8	8	8	8	8	8	8	8	8	8	8	8	8	8					

Updated to games played on 15 November 2017

== Season statistics ==
=== Top scorers ===
Rank	Pos.	Player	Club	Goals	Minutes played	Average minutes per goal
1	FW	(Lithuania) Darvydas Šernas	Žalgiris	18	2246	125
2	FW	(Lithuania) Karolis Laukžemis	Sūduva	14	2139	153
3	FW	(Brazil) Elivelto	Žalgiris	12	2437	204
4	FW	(Russia) Andrei Panyukov	Atlantas	11	1113	102
5	FW	(Russia) Maksim Maksimov	Trakai	10	1350	135
5	DF	(Bosnia and Herzegovina) Semir Kerla	Sūduva	10	1402	141
7	FW	(Ukraine) Maksym Marusych	Jonava	8	2451	307
7	MF	(Liberia) Oscar Dorley	Trakai	8	2516	315
9	FW	(Russia) Diniyar Bilyaletdinov	Trakai	7	805	115
9	FW	(Bosnia and Herzegovina) Bahrudin Atajić	Žalgiris	7	1088	156
9	FW	(Lithuania) Tadas Labukas	Trakai / Atlantas	7	1947	279

Updated to games played on 19 November 2017

=== Hat-tricks ===
Player	For	Against	Result	Date	Ref
(Russia) Andrei Panyukov	Atlantas	Stumbras	4–1 (H)	15 March 2017	
(Lithuania) Darvydas Šernas	Žalgiris	Stumbras	3–1 (A)	12 April 2017	
(Lithuania) Darvydas Šernas	Žalgiris	Sūduva	3–1 (H)	19 April 2017	
(Russia) Maksim Maksimov	Trakai	Utenis	3–0 (H)	21 June 2017	
(Croatia) Josip Tadić	Sūduva	Kauno Žalgiris	5–1 (A)	14 October 2017	

== Attendance ==
Pos	Team	Total	High	Low	Average	Change
1	Sūduva	18,506	4,489	300	1,089	+40.3%
2	Žalgiris	12,200	1,750	200	718	−8.9%
3	Utenis	7,245	1,100	92	453	+27.6%
4	Atlantas	7,100	1,300	200	444	−27.9%
5	Jonava	5,350	550	120	335	−31.9%
6	Trakai	4,630	1,000	75	273	+10.1%
7	Stumbras	2,880	420	70	206	−38.1%
8	Kauno Žalgiris	2,300	300	70	177	−47.8%
	League total	60,211	4,489	70	478	−4.6%

Source: A Lyga, LFF

— Official attendance statistic from one of the Kauno Žalgiris matches was not publicly released.

== Awards ==
=== Yearly awards ===
Awards were presented at the LFF Awards ceremony, which was held on December 4. Finalists for voted awards were announced after the season and winners were presented at the award ceremony.

2017 A Lyga awards
Award	Recipient(s)
Player of the Year	Karolis Laukžemis (Sūduva)
Young Player of the Year	Oscar Dorley (Trakai)
Manager of the Year	Vladimir Cheburin (Sūduva)
Golden Boot	Darvydas Šernas (Žalgiris)

=== Quarterly awards ===
Player of the Round
Period	Player	Rf
First Round (1–7)	Andrei Panyukov (Atlantas)	
Second Round (8–14)	Oscar Dorley (Trakai)	
Third Round (15–21)	Darvydas Šernas (Žalgiris)	
Fourth Round (22–28)	Wasn't announced	

Coach of the Round
Period	Coach	Rf
First Round (1–7)	Valdas Dambrauskas (Žalgiris)	
Second Round (8–14)	Oleg Vasilenko (Trakai)	
Third Round (15–21)	Oleg Vasilenko (Trakai)	
Fourth Round (22–28)	Wasn't announced	

== "Golden Heart" initiative ==
From 2016 season A lyga together with Lithuanian Football Federation decided to expand project "Bring you hearts to the stadium" and honor players who played 10 or more times for the Lithuania national team with golden heart on their shirts.

In 2017 season following players have had this evaluation:

- Žalgiris — Egidijus Vaitkūnas, Saulius Mikoliūnas, Vytautas Lukša, Mantas Kuklys, Darvydas Šernas, Georgas Freidgeimas, Linas Klimavičius
- Trakai — Deividas Česnauskis, Valdemaras Borovskis, Arūnas Klimavičius
- Atlantas — Linas Pilibaitis, Tadas Labukas (Note: Labukas also played for Trakai during the season.)
- Sūduva — Vaidas Slavickas
- Utenis — Pavelas Leusas
- Kauno Žalgiris — Ignas Dedura

Furthermore, Karolis Chvedukas was eligible to receive his "Heart" during the season, as he met qualification criterios.

== See also ==
Competitions

- 2017 Lithuanian Supercup
- 2017 LFF I Lyga
- 2017 Lithuanian Football Cup

Team seasons

- 2017 FK Žalgiris season
