= Andrei Panyukov =

Russian footballer

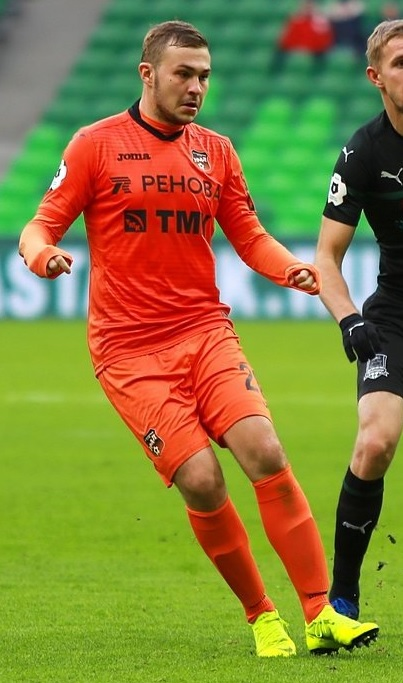
- Panyukov with Ural Yekaterinburg in 2018

Personal information
- Full name: Andrei Vladimirovich Panyukov
- Date of birth: 25 September 1994 (age 32)
- Place of birth: Moscow, Russia
- Height: 1.78 m (5 ft 10 in)
- Position: Striker

Youth career
- –2007: Lokomotiv Moscow
- 2007–2008: Megasfera-Obruchevsky Moscow
- 2008–2010: FC Moscow
- 2010–2013: Dynamo Moscow

Senior career*
Years	Team	Apps	(Gls)
2012–2015	Dynamo Moscow	6	(1)
2013	→ Khimki (loan)	8	(0)
2014	→ Spartak Nalchik (loan)	12	(2)
2014	→ Baltika Kaliningrad (loan)	7	(1)
2015	→ Atlantas (loan)	15	(17)
2015–2017	Atlantas	21	(14)
2015–2016	→ Ajaccio (loan)	23	(6)
2016	→ Ajaccio II (loan)	5	(7)
2016–2017	→ Braga B (loan)	6	(0)
2017–2019	Zenit Saint Petersburg	2	(0)
2017–2018	→ Zenit-2 Saint Petersburg	26	(15)
2018–2019	→ Ural Yekaterinburg (loan)	21	(6)
2019–2022	Ural Yekaterinburg	46	(6)
2022	→ Kyzylzhar (loan)	8	(0)
2022	Veles Moscow	6	(0)
2023	Slavia Mozyr	3	(1)
2023	Naftan Novopolotsk	14	(9)
2024	BATE Borisov	13	(4)

International career
2011	Russia U17	7	(3)
2011–2012	Russia U18	11	(11)
2012–2013	Russia U19	8	(4)
2012–2015	Russia U21	17	(8)
- * Club domestic league appearances and goals as of 30 June 2024

Andrei Vladimirovich Panyukov (Russian: Андрей Владимирович Панюков; born 25 September 1994) is a Russian professional footballer who plays as a striker.

== Career ==
Panyukov made his debut in the Russian Premier League on 21 July 2012 for Dynamo Moscow in a game vs Volga Nizhny Novgorod.

He was the top scorer of the Under-21 Russian Premier League competition of Spring 2012, scoring 13 goals in 13 games.

On 31 October 2012, he scored his first goal for the main Dynamo squad, giving them a 2–1 victory over FC Khimki in the 2012–13 Russian Cup Round of 16 game.

Panyukov joined FC Khimki on loan for the second part of 2012–13 season.

He scored his first league goal for Dynamo on 18 August 2013, giving them an equalizer with seven minutes left to play in an away game vs FC Krasnodar (the game ended 1–1).

For the second part of 2013–14 season Panyukov went on loan to Spartak Nalchik.

=== Atlantas ===
Panyukov joined Lithuanian A Lyga contenders Atlantas on loan before 2015 season. According to his agent, he chose Lithuanian club due to possibility to get a lot of playing time and be team leader.

He quickly managed to adapt in his new side and was lethal in front scoring 11 goals in the first round of the league becoming Player of the Round.

After his contract with Dynamo Moscow expired Panyukov choose to stay in Lithuania and signed one-year deal with Atlantas. Later he extended contract with the club until the end of 2018.

=== Ajaccio ===
For the 2015–16 season, Panyukov joined Ajaccio on loan, with an option to buy.

=== Braga ===
Panyukov was loaned to the Portuguese club S.C. Braga before the 2016–17 season, with an buy-out option. However, he only made six appearances for Braga B and none for the main squad, and on 30 January 2017, the club announced that his loan has been terminated.

=== Atlantas ===
Panyukov joins again his former club FK Atlantas for six months before to sign in Russian Premier League with Zenit FC. He scores 11 goals in 14 matches.

=== Zenit ===
On 10 August 2017, Panyukov returned to Russia, signing a three-year contract with FC Zenit Saint Petersburg.

=== Ural Yekaterinburg ===
On 9 August 2018, Panyukov joined Ural Yekaterinburg on loan for the 2018–19 season. On 29 September 2018, he scored two goals after coming on as a substitute to secure a 2–1 comeback victory for Ural over FC Arsenal Tula. Following the loan, on 27 June 2019 he moved to Ural on a permanent basis. On 11 January 2022, Panyukov was loaned to Kyzylzhar in Kazakhstan until 3 December 2022. On 22 June 2022, Panyukov's contract with Ural was terminated by mutual consent.

== Career statistics ==
=== Club ===
As of 11 December 2021

Appearances and goals by club, season and competition
Club	Season	League			Cup		Continental		Other		Total	
Club	Season	Division	Apps	Goals	Apps	Goals	Apps	Goals	Apps	Goals	Apps	Goals
Dynamo Moscow	2012–13	Russian Premier League	3	0	1	1	1 (Note: Appearances in the UEFA Europa League)	0	–		5	1
Dynamo Moscow	2013–14	Russian Premier League	3	1	1	0	–		–		4	1
Dynamo Moscow	Total		6	1	2	1	1	0	0	0	9	2
Khimki (loan)	2012–13	FNL	8	0	–		–		–		8	0
Spartak Nalchik (loan)	2013–14	FNL	12	2	–		–		–		12	2
Baltika Kaliningrad (loan)	2014–15	FNL	7	1	2	0	–		–		9	1
Atlantas (loan)	2015	A Lyga	15	17	3	0	–		–		18	17
Atlantas	2015	A Lyga	5	3	–		2	0	–		7	3
Atlantas	2016	A Lyga	2	0	–		–		–		2	0
Atlantas	2017	A Lyga	14	11	1	3	–		–		15	14
Atlantas	Total		21	14	1	3	2	0	0	0	24	17
Ajaccio (loan)	2015–16	Ligue 2	23	6	2	0	–		–		25	6
Ajaccio II (loan)	2015–16	Championnat National 3	5	7	–		–		–		5	7
Braga B (loan)	2016–17	LigaPro	6	0	–		–		–		6	0
Zenit St. Petersburg	2017–18	Russian Premier League	2	0	0	0	0	0	–		2	0
Zenit-2 St. Petersburg	2017–18	FNL	26	15	–		–		–		26	15
Ural Yekaterinburg	2018–19	Russian Premier League	21	6	5	1	–		1 (Note: Appearance in the FNL Cup)	0	27	7
Ural Yekaterinburg	2019–20	Russian Premier League	24	4	3	1	–		1	0	28	5
Ural Yekaterinburg	2020–21	Russian Premier League	16	1	2	2	–		–		18	3
Ural Yekaterinburg	2021–22	Russian Premier League	6	1	1	1	–		–		7	2
Ural Yekaterinburg	Total		67	12	11	5	0	0	2	0	80	17
Career total			198	75	21	9	3	0	2	0	224	84

== Honours ==
Individual

- CIS Cup top goalscorer: 2013
