= Pavel Gusev (footballer) =

Russian footballer and football manager

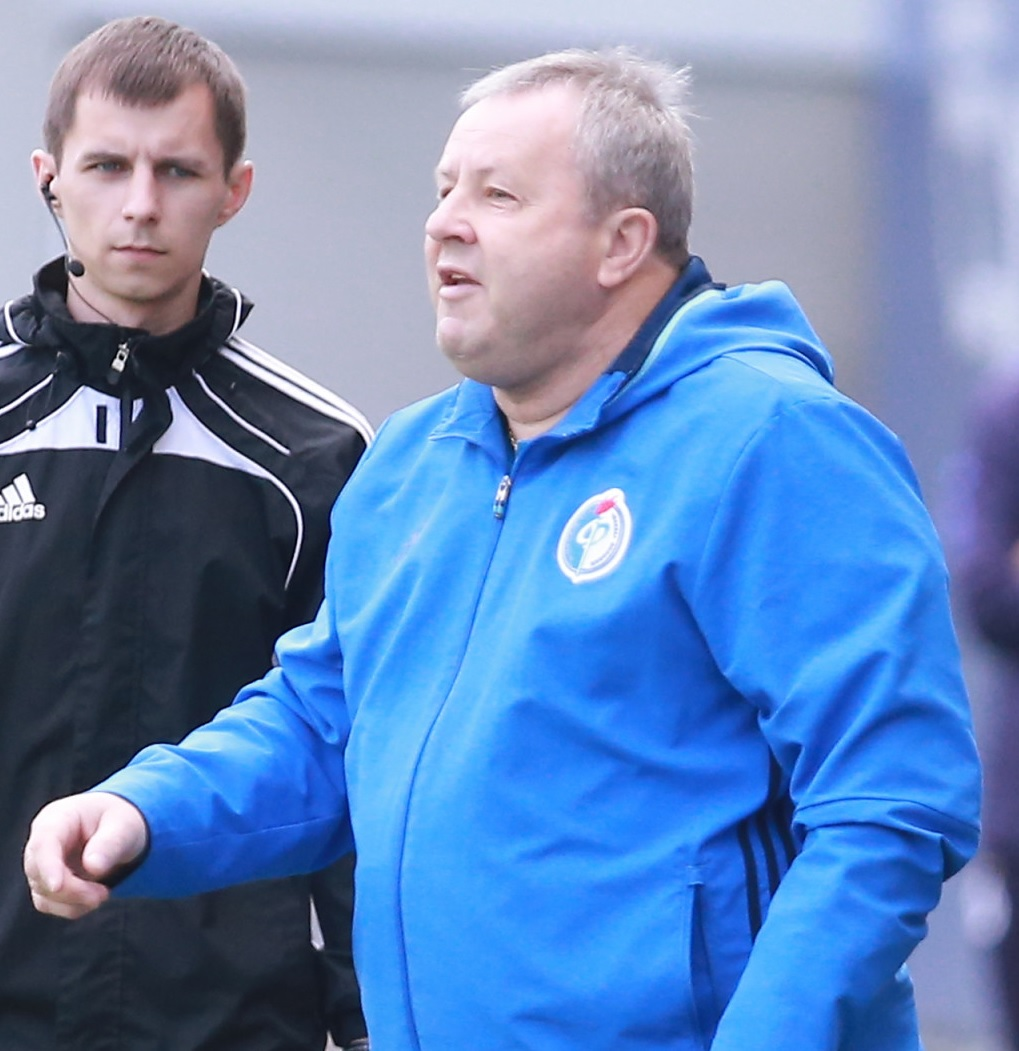
- Gusev coaching Fakel in 2017

Personal information
- Full name: Pavel Panteleyevich Gusev
- Date of birth: 2 January 1953 (age 73)
- Place of birth: Snizhne, Ukrainian SSR
- Height: 1.81 m (5 ft 11 1/2 in)
- Position: Midfielder

Senior career*
Years	Team	Apps	(Gls)
1969–1970	Shakhtar Torez		
1972–1974	Barrikady Volgograd	104	(13)
1975	Rubin Kazan	0	(0)
1975	Rotor Volgograd	32	(6)
1976–1982	SKA Rostov-on-Don	199	(31)

Managerial career
- 1984: SKA Rostov-on-Don (assistant)
- 1987: SKA Rostov-on-Don (assistant)
- 1988–1989: SKA Rostov-on-Don
- 2001: Rotor Volgograd
- 2002: Fakel-Voronezh Voronezh
- 2003–2004: Ural Yekaterinburg
- 2005–2006: Petrotrest St. Petersburg
- 2006–2008: Taganrog
- 2010–2011: Astrakhan
- 2011–2012: Ural Yekaterinburg (consultant)
- 2012–2013: Ural Yekaterinburg
- 2013–2014: Dynamo St. Petersburg
- 2014–2018: Fakel Voronezh
- * Club domestic league appearances and goals

Pavel Panteleyevich (in some sources Panteleymonovich) Gusev (Russian: Павел Пантелеевич (Пантелеймонович) Гусев; born 2 January 1953) is a Russian professional football coach and a former player.

== Playing career ==
He played four games in the 1981–82 European Cup Winners' Cup for SKA Rostov-on-Don after winning the Soviet Cup with the team in 1981.

== Managerial career ==
Until 1 August 2013, he worked as a manager with Ural Yekaterinburg and in 2013 promoted them to the Russian Football Premier League for the first time since 1996.
