= Karolis Laukžemis =

Lithuanian footballer

Personal information
- Date of birth: 11 March 1992 (age 34)
- Place of birth: Palanga, Lithuania
- Height: 1.88 m (6 ft 2 in)
- Position: Striker

Team information
- Current team: Panargiakos
- Number: 92

Youth career
- –2008: Atlantas

Senior career*
| Years | Team | Apps | (Gls) |
| 2008–2014 | Atlantas | 62 | (5) |
| 2014 | → Palanga (loan) | 11 | (4) |
| 2015 | Klaipėdos Granitas | 18 | (7) |
| 2015–2016 | Sūduva | 32 | (3) |
| 2016 | → Jelgava (loan) | 15 | (2) |
| 2017–2018 | Sūduva | 42 | (20) |
| 2018–2020 | Istra 1961 | 17 | (2) |
| 2020 | → Tabor Sežana (loan) | 11 | (2) |
| 2020 | Hibernians | 6 | (4) |
| 2021 | Kaisar | 31 | (9) |
| 2022 | UTA Arad | 12 | (0) |
| 2022 | Sūduva | 12 | (0) |
| 2023 | Banga | 23 | (5) |
| 2023 | Ayutthaya United | 14 | (5) |
| 2024 | Alessandria | 10 | (0) |
| 2024 | Panargiakos | 8 | (1) |
| 2025 | Odi Sports Club | 12 | (8) |

International career^{‡}
| 2008 | Lithuania U17 | 1 | (0) |
| 2010–2011 | Lithuania U19 | 8 | (2) |
| 2012–2013 | Lithuania U21 | 5 | (0) |
| 2018–2021 | Lithuania | 31 | (2) |
- * Club domestic league appearances and goals as of 10 December 2024 ‡ National team caps and goals as of 21 July 2026

Karolis Laukžemis (born 11 March 1992) is a Lithuanian professional footballer who plays as a striker.

== Career ==
Born in Palanga, Lithuania he has played club football for FK Atlantas, FK Klaipėdos Granitas, FK Sūduva Marijampolė and FK Jelgava. In 2017 he was one of the main figures to help FK Suduva Marijampole to win their first championship ever. He was awarded as best player of A lyga in that season. On 26 October 2020, Laukžemis moved to Maltese club Hibernians on a one-year deal.

On 2 September 2022 Sūduva announced about deal with Laukžemis till the end of the A Lyga 2023 season.

== International career ==
Laukžemis made his international debut for the Lithuania in 2018.

=== International stats ===
Lithuania national team
| Year | Apps | Goals |
|---|---|---|
| 2018 | 6 | 1 |
| 2019 | 6 | 0 |
| 2020 | 7 | 1 |
| 2021 | 8 | 0 |
| Total | 27 | 2 |

=== International goals ===
Scores and results list Lithuania's goal tally first.

| No. | Date | Venue | Cap | Opponent | Score | Result | Competition |
|---|---|---|---|---|---|---|---|
| 1 | 5 June 2018 | LFF Stadium, Vilnius, Lithuania | 4 | Latvia | 1–1 | 1–1 | 2018 Baltic Cup |
| 2 | 11 October 2020 | LFF Stadium, Vilnius, Lithuania | 15 | Belarus | 2–2 | 2–2 | 2020–21 UEFA Nations League C |

== Honours ==
Atlantas

- A Lyga runner-up: 2013

Sūduva

- A Lyga: 2017
- Lithuanian Cup runner-up: 2016
- Lithuanian Supercup: 2018

Jelgava

- Virslīga runner-up: 2016

Individual

- A Lyga Player of the Year: 2017
- A Lyga Player of the Month: March 2018
