= Marko Vukčević (footballer) =

Montenegrin footballer

Personal information
- Date of birth: 7 June 1993 (age 33)
- Place of birth: Podgorica, FR Yugoslavia
- Height: 1.81 m (5 ft 11 in)
- Positions: Right winger; wing-back; full-back

Team information
- Current team: Tobol
- Number: 15

Youth career
- –2010: Budućnost

Senior career*
Years	Team	Apps	(Gls)
2010–2013	Budućnost	52	(8)
2013–2017	Olimpija Ljubljana	68	(9)
2015–2016	→ Vojvodina (loan)	17	(1)
2017	Budućnost	11	(0)
2018–2019	Inter Zaprešić	32	(2)
2019	Paykan	10	(0)
2020	Grbalj	11	(0)
2020–2021	Podgorica	32	(1)
2021–2023	UTA Arad	65	(0)
2023–2024	Varaždin	31	(0)
2024	Borac Banja Luka	11	(0)
2025–	Tobol	32	(5)

International career^{‡}
2010–2012	Montenegro U19	14	(5)
2011–2014	Montenegro U21	14	(3)
2015–	Montenegro	17	(1)
- * Club domestic league appearances and goals as of 2 July 2026 ‡ National team caps and goals as of 10 September 2023

Marko Vukčević (Montenegrin Cyrillic: Марко Вукчевић; born 7 June 1993) is a Montenegrin professional footballer who plays for Kazakhstani club Tobol.

== Club career ==
=== Budućnost ===
Vukčević started his professional career at his hometown club Budućnost Podgorica. He provided an assist to teammate Mitar Peković in the 2013 Montenegrin Cup Final against Čelik Nikšić, which Budućnost won 1–0. By the end of his first spell at Budućnost, he played a total of 52 league matches and scored 8 goals.

=== Olimpija Ljubljana ===
On 23 August 2013, Vukčević transferred to the Slovenian club Olimpija. He made his debut for Olimpija on 31 August 2013 in a match against Domžale, where his side lost 3–0. On 9 November 2013, he scored his first goal for Olimpija in a league match against Domžale. In September 2015, Olimpija sent Vukčević on a season loan to Serbian side FK Vojvodina. Over the course of the 2015–16 season at Vojvodina, he played a total of 20 games and recorded one goal and three assists by the time his loan deal to Vojvodina expired in June 2016.

=== Return to Budućnost ===
On 27 July 2017, Vukčević signed a one-year contract with Budućnost.

=== Inter Zaprešić ===
On 11 January 2018, Vukčević signed with Croatian club Inter Zaprešić.

== International career ==
Vukčević has appeared for Montenegro's youth selections up to the under-21 level. He has been a frequently relied-on player for Montenegro U21 for the 2015 UEFA European Under-21 Football Championship qualification. He made his senior debut for Montenegro in a June 2015 friendly match against Denmark and has, as of 19 October 2020, earned a total of 3 caps, scoring no goals.

=== International stats ===
As of 10 September 2023

National team	Year	Apps	Goals
Montenegro
Montenegro	2015	1	0
Montenegro	2016	0	0
Montenegro	2017	0	0
Montenegro	2018	0	0
Montenegro	2019	0	0
Montenegro	2020	3	0
Montenegro	2021	4	0
Montenegro	2022	6	1
Montenegro	2023	3	0
Total		17	1

=== International goals ===
Scores and results list Montenegro's goal tally first, score column indicates score after each Vukčević goal.

List of international goals scored by Marko Vukčević
No.	Date	Venue	Opponent	Score	Result	Competition
1	4 June 2022	Podgorica City Stadium, Podgorica, Montenegro	Romania	2–0	2–0	2022–23 UEFA Nations League B

== Honours ==
Budućnost Podgorica

- Prva CFL: 2011–12
- Montenegrin Cup: 2012–13

Olimpija Ljubljana

- Slovenian Cup runner-up: 2016–17
