= Oleg Vasilenko =

Russian professional football manager (born 1973)

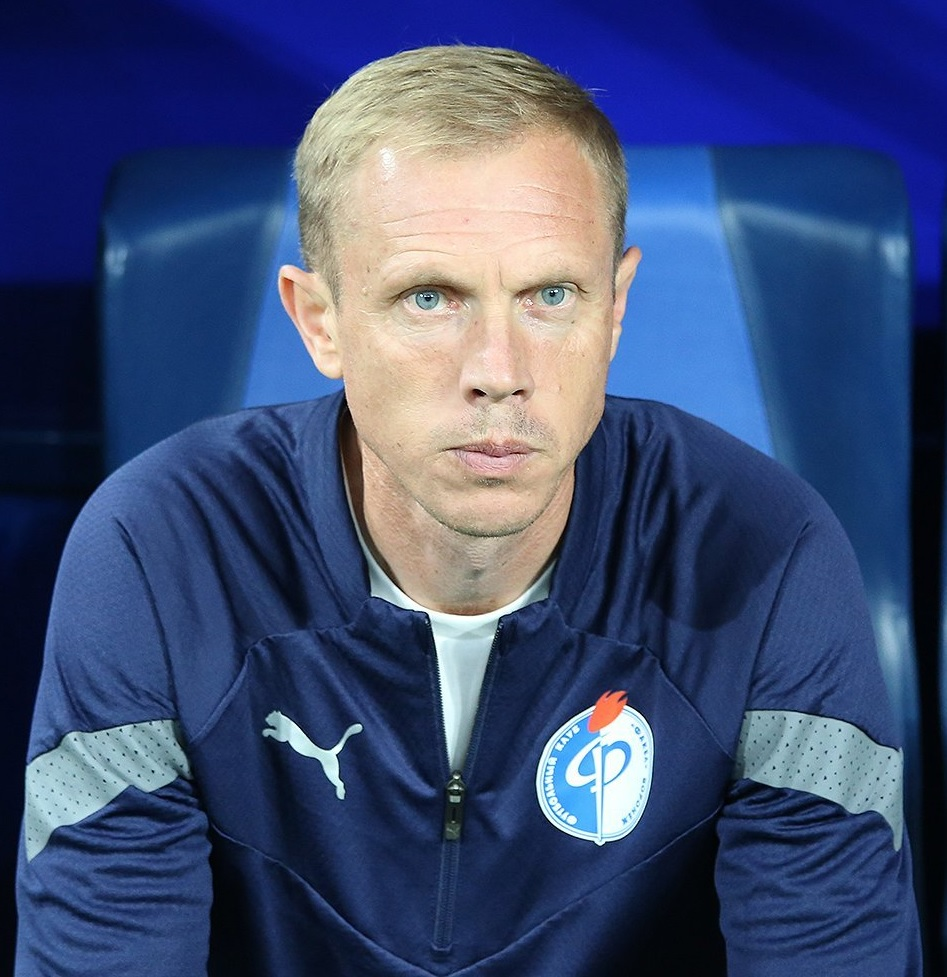
- Vasilenko with FC Fakel Voronezh in 2022

Personal information
- Full name: Oleg Petrovich Vasilenko
- Date of birth: 6 October 1973 (age 53)
- Place of birth: Stavropol, Soviet Union

Managerial career
- Years: Team
- 1992–1996: DYuSh-4 Stavropol
- 1996–2000: UOR Dynamo Stavropol
- 2000–2002: SGU Stavropol
- 2002–2003: PFC CSKA Moscow (youth)
- 2003: FC Spartak-Kavkaztransgaz Izobilny (assistant)
- 2003–2004: FC Zhemchuzhina Sochi (assistant)
- 2004: FC Rodnik Tikhoretsk
- 2004–2005: SKA SKVO Stavropol
- 2005–2008: FC Saturn Moscow Oblast (reserves)
- 2009–2010: FC Zhemchuzhina-Sochi
- 2010: FC Zhemchuzhina-Sochi (assistant)
- 2010: FC Zhemchuzhina-Sochi
- 2010–2011: FC Dinamo Minsk
- 2011: FC Krasnodar (reserves)
- 2012–2013: FC Anzhi Makhachkala (assistant)
- 2013: FC Ural Sverdlovsk Oblast
- 2014–2015: FC Sochi
- 2016: RFS
- 2017–2018: Trakai
- 2018: FC Baltika Kaliningrad (assistant)
- 2019: FC Avangard Kursk (assistant)
- 2019: FC Avangard Kursk
- 2020: FC Mordovia Saransk
- 2020–2022: FC Fakel Voronezh
- 2023: FC Alania Vladikavkaz
- 2024: FC Telavi
- 2024–2025: FC Chernomorets Novorossiysk
- 2025–2026: FC Fakel Voronezh

Oleg Petrovich Vasilenko (Russian: Олег Петрович Василенко; born 6 October 1973) is a Russian professional football manager.

== Coaching career ==
Previously he worked as a manager with FC Ural and FC Sochi and Latvian Virsliga side RFS.

On 21 August 2019, he was appointed manager of FC Avangard Kursk, where he was previously an assistant coach. He left the club on 23 December 2019. On 14 September 2020, he was appointed head coach of FC Fakel Voronezh. Under his management, Fakel finished 2nd in the 2021–22 Russian Football National League to secure promotion to the Russian Premier League for the first time since the 2001 season. Vasilenko left Fakel by mutual consent on 6 September 2022, after Fakel started the 2022–23 Russian Premier League with 4 points and no wins in the first 8 games.

In January 2024, Vasilenko was appointed head coach of the Georgian club Telavi.

In the 2025–26 Russian First League season, Vasilenko led Fakel Voronezh to promotion to Russian Premier League once again. Once again, he left Fakel by mutual consent on 11 October 2026 after gaining 3 points and no victories in the first 10 games after the top-tier return.

== Honours ==
- Russian Second Division, Zone South best manager: 2009
- A Lyga Manager of the Round: 2017 second round, 2017 third round
