= Nikola Perić =

Serbian footballer

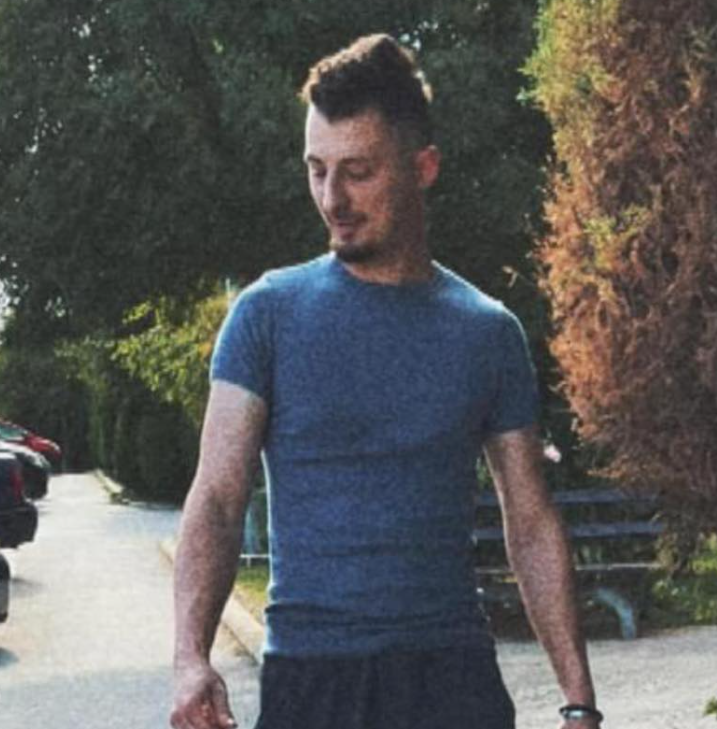

Personal information
- Date of birth: 4 February 1992 (age 34)
- Place of birth: Šabac, SFR Yugoslavia
- Height: 1.90 m (6 ft 3 in)
- Position: Goalkeeper

Team information
- Current team: Picuiense

Youth career
- Vojvodina

Senior career*
Years	Team	Apps	(Gls)
2010–2011	Mačva Šabac	4	(0)
2011–2013	Hajduk Kula	25	(0)
2013	Voždovac	15	(0)
2014–2015	Jagodina	20	(0)
2015–2018	Vojvodina	14	(0)
2018–2019	Spartak Subotica	6	(0)
2019	Dinamo Vranje	8	(0)
2020	Proleter Novi Sad	0	(0)
2020–2021	Mačva Šabac	6	(0)
2021–2022	Mačva 1929		
2022–	Altos	0	(0)
2024	Força e Luz	10	(0)
2024–2025	AD Picuiense	3	(0)
2025–	Força e Luz	1	(0)

International career
2011	Serbia U19 (Note: Only official UEFA matches included)	6	(0)
2013–2014	Serbia U21	8	(0)
- * Club domestic league appearances and goals as of 18 May 2021

Nikola Perić (Serbian Cyrillic: Никола Перић; born 4 February 1992) is a Serbian professional footballer who plays as a goalkeeper for side Picuiense.

== Club career ==
After starting out at Vojvodina, Perić made his senior debut with Mačva Šabac. He subsequently played for Serbian SuperLiga clubs Hajduk Kula, Voždovac and Jagodina. On 17 July 2015, Perić returned to his parent club Vojvodina, penning a three-year deal. On 26 June 2018, Nikola signed a two-year deal with Spartak Subotica.

After joining Dinamo Vranje in February 2019, he left the club again at the end of the season.

== International career ==
Perić represented Serbia at the 2011 UEFA European Under-19 Championship, playing the full 90 minutes in all four of his team's games, as they were eliminated by the Czech Republic in the semi-finals. He was also a member of the under-21 team that finished bottom of their group at the 2015 UEFA European Under-21 Championship.
