= Shamsiddin Shanbiyev =

Russian footballer (born 1997)

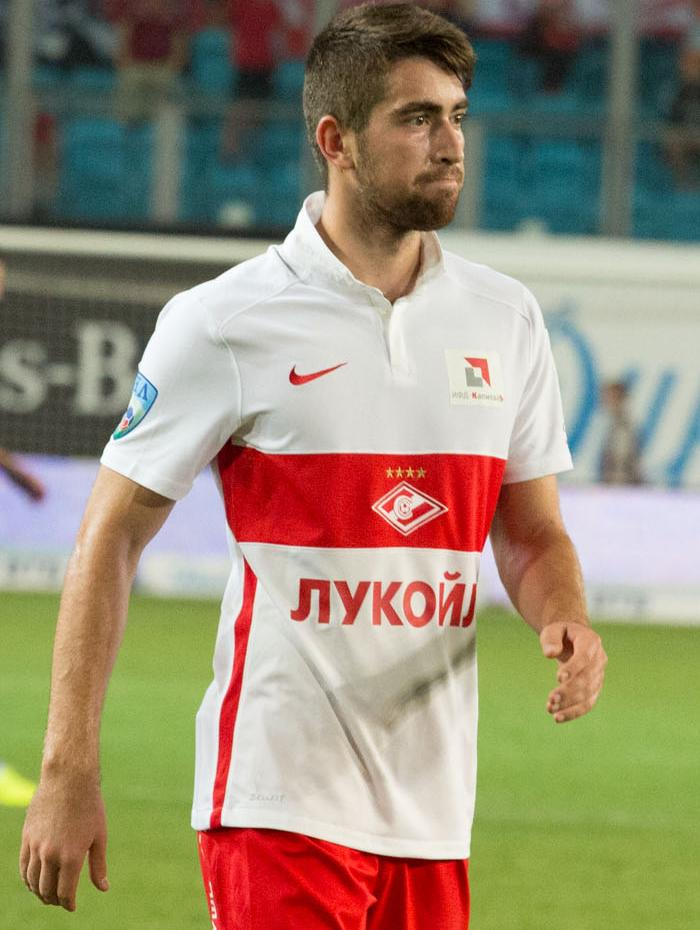
- Shanbiyev with Spartak-2 in 2016

Personal information
- Full name: Shamsiddin Asroridinovich Shanbiyev
- Date of birth: 18 February 1997 (age 29)
- Place of birth: Sughd Region, Tajikistan
- Height: 1.81 m (5 ft 11 in)
- Positions: Defender; midfielder

Youth career
- –2016: Spartak Moscow

Senior career*
Years	Team	Apps	(Gls)
2015–2018	Spartak-2 Moscow	48	(0)
2016–2018	Spartak Moscow	0	(0)
2018–2020	Ural Yekaterinburg	0	(0)
2019–2020	→ Ural-2 Yekaterinburg	3	(0)
2021	Isloch Minsk Raion	3	(0)
2021–2022	Irtysh Omsk	1	(0)

International career^{‡}
2014–2015	Russia U18	8	(0)
2015–2016	Russia U19	4	(0)
2016–2018	Russia U21	8	(0)
- * Club domestic league appearances and goals as of 4 June 2022 ‡ National team caps and goals as of 20 May 2018

Shamsiddin Asroridinovich Shanbiyev (Russian: Шамсиддин Асроридинович Шанбиев, Tajik: Шамсиддин Шанбийев; born 18 February 1997) is a Russian former football player of Tajik origin.

== Club career ==
He made his debut in the Russian Football National League for FC Spartak-2 Moscow on 7 April 2016 in a game against FC Baltika Kaliningrad.

On 22 October 2018, he signed with FC Ural Yekaterinburg. As the transfer window was closed at the time, he was not eligible to play for Ural until 2019. On 19 January 2021, his Ural contract was terminated by mutual consent.

On 15 January 2021, he signed with Belarusian club FC Isloch Minsk Raion.
