= Francesco Vivacqua =

Italian footballer

Personal information
- Date of birth: 19 June 1994 (age 32)
- Place of birth: Cosenza, Italy
- Height: 1.80 m (5 ft 11 in)
- Position: Forward

Team information
- Current team: Real Casalnuovo
- Number: 94

Youth career
- –2008: Enotria
- 2008–2009: Cosenza
- 2009–2013: Lazio

Senior career*
Years	Team	Apps	(Gls)
2013–2014	Taranto	14	(0)
2015–2016	Spartaks Jūrmala	23	(1)
2016–2020	Rende	113	(17)
2020–2021	Cavese	14	(0)
2021–2022	Picerno	26	(3)
2022–2023	Molfetta	3	(0)
2023–	Real Casalnuovo	0	(0)
- * Club domestic league appearances and goals as of 18 September 2022

Francesco Vivacqua (born 19 June 1994) is an Italian football player. He plays for Serie D club Real Casalnuovo.

== Club career ==
In the 2015–16 season, he helped his Latvian club Spartaks Jūrmala advance to the second qualifying round of the Europa League, and scored a late equalizer in the return leg of the second-round game against Vojvodina, but his team was eliminated 1–4 on aggregate.

He made his Serie C debut for Rende on 26 August 2017 in a game against Reggina.

On 8 October 2020 he moved to Cavese.

On 19 August 2021, he signed with Picerno.

In August 2023, he signed with Real Casalnuovo
