= Oleh Boychyshyn =

Ukrainian footballer and manager

Personal information
- Full name: Oleh Ivanovych Boychyshyn
- Date of birth: 12 August 1973 (age 53)
- Place of birth: Lviv, Soviet Union
- Height: 1.86 m (6 ft 1 in)
- Position: Defender

Team information
- Current team: Karpaty Lviv (caretaker)

Youth career
- SSSOR Karpaty Lviv

Senior career*
Years	Team	Apps	(Gls)
1992–1993	Karpaty Lviv	8	(1)
1996	Volyn Lutsk	8	(1)
1997	Lviv	5	(0)
1998–2000	Podillya Khmelnytskyi	73	(7)
2000–2001	Sokil Zolochiv	28	(2)
2001	Frunzenets-Liha-99 Sumy	8	(0)
Total		130	(11)

International career
1993	Ukraine U-21	1	(0)

Managerial career
- ?: SSSOR Karpaty Lviv (assistant)
- 2011–2012: Karpaty-2 Lviv (assistant)
- 2016–2017: Utenis Utena (assistant / head coach)
- 2017–2018: Karpaty Lviv
- 2018: Karpaty Lviv (caretaker)
- * Club domestic league appearances and goals

Oleh Ivanovych Boychyshyn (Ukrainian: Олег Іванович Бойчишин; born 12 August 1973 in Lviv, Ukrainian SSR) is a Ukrainian retired football defender and current football manager.

== Career ==
Boychyshyn is a product of the FC Karpaty Lviv academy. His professional career he spent in lower football leagues of Ukraine. After retirement as a player Boychyshyn became a children coach in the Karpaty's academy. In 2011–12, he became an assistant manager of FC Karpaty-2 Lviv, later moved to Lithuania where he coached FK Utenis Utena. On 21 October 2017, Boychyshyn was appointed a head coach of FC Karpaty Lviv.
