= FC Ural Yekaterinburg =

Russian professional football club

Ural Yekaterinburg
- Full name: Football Club Ural; Sverdlovsk Oblast or FC Ural Yekaterinburg
- Nicknames: Shmeli (Bumblebees); Oranzhevo-chornyye (Orange and Black); Uraltsy (Ural men)
- Founded: September 1, 1930; 96 years ago
- Ground: Ekaterinburg Arena
- Capacity: 35,061
- Owner: Sverdlovsk Oblast
- Chairman: Grigori Ivanov
- Manager: Sergei Yuran
- League: Russian First League
- 2024–25: 4th of 18
- Website: fc-ural.ru

FC Ural Yekaterinburg (Russian: ФК Урал) is a Russian professional association football club based in Yekaterinburg that plays in the Russian First League.

== History ==
The club was founded in 1930 and was known as Avangard (1930–1948, 1953–1957), Zenit (1944–1946), Mashinostroitel (1958–1959), and Uralmash (1949–1952, 1960–2002). The club is currently named after the Russian region of Ural, where Yekaterinburg is the capital.

The club participated in the Soviet championships beginning in 1945. They mostly played in the higher leagues, with the exception of the 1969 season spent in the lowest league. They were the easternmost Russian SFSR club to compete in the third Soviet division (the easternmost Soviet club overall was FC Kairat from Alma-Ata, Kazakh SSR).

Uralmash reached the quarterfinals of the Soviet Cup in 1965/66, 1967/68, and 1990/91.

After the dissolution of the USSR, Uralmash were entitled to enter the Russian Top Division and played there for five seasons, from 1992 to 1996. Their best result was eighth position in 1993 and 1995. Despite reaching the semifinal of the Intertoto Cup in 1996, Uralmash finished 16th out of 18 in the league and were relegated. In 1997 another relegation followed, now to the Second Division. From 1998 to 2002 Uralmash played in the Second Division. After winning promotion, the club was renamed Ural. In 2003, the team were relegated from the Russian First Division, but were promoted again after the 2004 season. The team's best finish in the First Division was third in 2006.

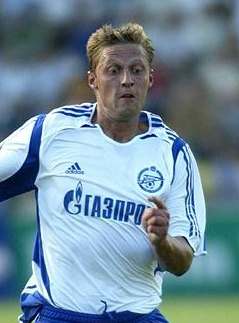
Robertas Poškus joined FC Ural in 2009

FC Ural reached the Russian cup final in 2017 for the first time in their history. They lost the final against Lokomotiv Moscow. In 2019, FC Ural faced Lokomotiv Moscow again in their second Russian cup final. Lokomotiv Moscow defeated FC Ural in that final.

In the 2023–24 season, Ural finished 13th, qualifying for the relegation play-offs. They lost 2–3 to Akron Tolyatti on aggregate and were relegated to the Russian First League after 11 seasons at the top tier.

In the 2024–25 season, Ural finished 4th in the First League and qualified for the promotion play-offs. They lost to Akhmat Grozny with an aggregate score of 2–3 and remained in the First League.

In the 2025–26 season, Ural qualified for the promotion play-offs once more, they lost to Dynamo Makhachkala 0–3 on aggregate and stayed in the First League.

=== Domestic ===
Season	League									Russian Cup	Top goalscorer		Manager
Season	Div.	Pos.	Pl.	W	D	L	GS	GA	P	Russian Cup	Name	League	Manager
2008	2nd	4th	42	22	9	11	69	39	75	Fourth Round			Aleksandr Pobegalov
2009	2nd	8th	38	15	15	8	40	32	60	Round of 16	Vladimir Shishelov	16	Aleksandr Pobegalov; Vladimir Fedotov
2010	2nd	7th	38	14	16	8	38	28	58	Fifth Round	Predrag Sikimić	7	Vladimir Fedotov; Boris Stukalov
2011–12	2nd	6th	52	19	21	12	71	52	78	Round of 32	Branimir Petrović	8	Dmitry Ogai; Yuri Matveyev
2012–13	2nd	1st	32	19	11	2	61	18	68	Round of 32	Spartak Gogniyev	17	Aleksandr Pobegalov; Sergei Bulatov; Pavel Gusev
2013–14	1st	11th	30	9	7	14	28	46	34	Fifth Round	Spartak Gogniyev	9	Pavel Gusev; Oleg Vasilenko; Aleksandr Tarkhanov
2014–15	1st	13th	30	9	3	18	31	44	30	Round of 32	Fyodor Smolov	8	Aleksandr Tarkhanov
2015–16	1st	8th	30	10	9	11	39	46	39	Round of 16	Spartak Gogniyev	8	Viktor Goncharenko; Vadim Skripchenko
2016–17	1st	11th	30	8	6	16	24	44	30	Runners-Up	Vladimir Ilyin; Roman Pavlyuchenko	4	Vadim Skripchenko; Yuri Matveyev (caretaker); Aleksandr Tarkhanov
2017–18	1st	12th	30	8	13	9	31	32	37	Round of 32	Eric Bicfalvi	8	Aleksandr Tarkhanov
2018–19	1st	10th	30	10	8	12	33	45	38	Runners-Up	Eric Bicfalvi; Andrei Panyukov	6	Dmytro Parfenov
2019–20	1st	11th	30	9	8	13	36	53	35	Semi-final	Eric Bicfalvi	8	Dmytro Parfenov
2020–21	1st	12th	30	7	13	10	26	36	34	Round of 16	Eric Bicfalvi	7	Yuri Matveyev
2021–22	1st	12th	30	8	9	13	27	35	33	Round of 32	Eric Bicfalvi	10	Yuri Matveyev; Igor Shalimov

== Current squad ==
=== First team ===
As of 11 September 2026

Note: Flags indicate national team as defined under FIFA eligibility rules; some limited exceptions apply. Players may hold more than one non-FIFA nationality.

No.	Pos.	Nation	Player
2	DF	CRO	Silvije Begić
5	DF	RUS	Vitali Stezhko (on loan from Krasnodar)
6	MF	RUS	Fanil Sungatulin
10	FW	CRO	Martin Sekulić
11	FW	RUS	Denis Bokov (on loan from Dynamo Moscow)
13	MF	RUS	Maksim Kaynov (on loan from Sochi)
15	DF	RUS	Dmitry Tikhy
16	DF	BRA	Ítalo
17	MF	RUS	Vladislav Karapuzov (on loan from Nizhny Novgorod)
18	MF	RUS	Nikita Morozov
19	MF	ARM	Khoren Bayramyan
22	MF	BRA	Léo Cordeiro
24	DF	RUS	Aleksandr Korotkov
28	MF	RUS	Ilya Skoropupov
30	DF	RUS	Klimenty Sidorov
33	FW	RUS	Denis Gazhalov
35	DF	BLR	Dmitry Prishchepa
37	MF	RUS	Vitaly Bondarev
40	MF	RUS	Nikita Khrisanfov
43	DF	RUS	Roman Shoronov
44	MF	BLR	Vladislav Malkevich

No.	Pos.	Nation	Player
45	DF	RUS	Yury Mozzhukhin
46	DF	RUS	Artyom Mamin
55	MF	RUS	Danil Basyrov
57	GK	RUS	Aleksandr Selikhov
58	MF	RUS	Vladimir Santalov
59	MF	RUS	Yevgeni Kharin
61	MF	RUS	Ivan Alfyorov
62	FW	RUS	Pavel Satuchin
67	GK	RUS	Yury Maleyev
69	DF	RUS	Artyom Fotin
76	FW	RUS	Vitaly Nem
77	GK	RUS	Maksim Aleksandrov
82	FW	RUS	Stanislav Bondarenko
86	GK	RUS	Ivan Kuznetsov
87	MF	RUS	Artyom Akhmedyanov
88	FW	RUS	Artyom Krylovsky
90	MF	RUS	Tigran Arabachyan
92	DF	RUS	Ivan Ryzhkov
97	MF	RUS	Ilya Ishkov
99	FW	FRA	Bertrand Fourrier

=== Out on loan ===
Note: Flags indicate national team as defined under FIFA eligibility rules; some limited exceptions apply. Players may hold more than one non-FIFA nationality.

No.	Pos.	Nation	Player
—	GK	RUS	Aleksei Mamin (at Volgar Astrakhan until 30 June 2027)
—	DF	POR	Gonçalo Miguel (at Pyunik until 31 December 2026)

No.	Pos.	Nation	Player
—	MF	RUS	Yegor Mosin (at SKA-Khabarovsk until 30 June 2027)

=== Retired numbers ===
- 23 – (Russia) Pyotr Khrustovsky, forward (2003) – posthumous honor

== Coaching staff ==
- Head coach – Yuri Matveyev
- Assistant coach – Vladimir Kalashnikov, Andrei Danilov, (North Macedonia) Ivan Jovanovski
- Goalkeeping coach – Andrei Shpilyov

== Notable players ==
Had international caps for their respective countries. Players whose name is listed in bold represented their countries while playing for Ural/Uralmash.

Russia/USSR

- (Soviet Union) Viktor Shishkin
- (Russia) Arsen Adamov
- (Russia) Mingiyan Beveyev
- (Russia) Nikita Chernov
- (Russia) Yury Gazinsky
- (Russia) Aleksei Ionov
- (Russia) **Yuri Matveyev**
- (Russia) Roman Pavlyuchenko
- (Russia) Aleksandr Podshivalov
- (Russia) **Ilya Pomazun**
- (Russia) Aleksandr Ryazantsev
- (Russia) Oleg Shatov
- (Russia) Igor Smolnikov
- (Russia) Fyodor Smolov
- (Russia) Oleg Veretennikov
- (Russia) Dmitry Yefremov
- (Russia) Artyom Yenin
- (Russia) Aleksandr Yerokhin
- (Russia) **Aleksandr Yushin**
- (Russia) Artur Yusupov
- (Russia) Anton Zabolotny
- (Russia) Denis Zubko

Former USSR countries
Armenia

- (Armenia) **Artak Aleksanyan**
- (Armenia) **Edgar Manucharyan**
- (Armenia) **Artur Sarkisov**
- (Armenia) Varazdat Haroyan

Belarus

- (Belarus) **Andrey Chukhley**
- (Belarus) Alyaksandr Hrapkowski
- (Belarus) **Vladislav Malkevich**
- (Belarus) **Alyaksandr Martynovich**
- (Belarus) Nikolay Zolotov
- (Belarus) Aleh Shkabara
- (Belarus) Yuri Zhevnov

Estonia

- (Estonia) **Aleksandr Dmitrijev**

Georgia

- (Georgia (country)) **Giorgi Chanturia**

Kazakhstan

- (Kazakhstan) Vitaliy Abramov
- (Kazakhstan) Sergei Anashkin
- (Kazakhstan) **Renat Dubinskiy**
- (Kazakhstan) Vitaliy Kafanov
- (Kazakhstan) Konstantin Ledovskikh
- (Kazakhstan) Aleksandr Sklyarov
- (Kazakhstan) Georgy Zhukov

Lithuania

- (Lithuania) **Arūnas Klimavičius**
- (Lithuania) **Robertas Poškus**

Moldova

- (Moldova) **Igor Bugaiov**
- (Moldova) Serghei Rogaciov

Tajikistan

- (Tajikistan) Vitaliy Levchenko
- (Tajikistan) **Igor Vityutnev**
- (Tajikistan) **Anatoli Volovodenko**
- (Tajikistan) Shamsiddin Shanbiev

Ukraine

- (Ukraine) Denys Kulakov
- (Ukraine) Oleksandr Pomazun
- (Ukraine) Dmytro Topchiev

Uzbekistan

- (Uzbekistan) **Vladimir Radkevich**
- (Uzbekistan) Yevgeni Safonov
- (Uzbekistan) Vladimir Shishelov
- (Uzbekistan) **Oston Urunov**

Europe
Hungary

- (Hungary) **Vladimir Koman**

Iceland

- (Iceland) **Sölvi Ottesen**

Israel

- (Israel) **Toto Tamuz**

Norway

- (Norway) Stefan Strandberg

Poland

- (Poland) **Rafał Augustyniak**
- (Poland) Michał Kucharczyk
- (Poland) Maciej Wilusz

Romania

- (Romania) **Eric Bicfalvi**

South America

Chile

- (Chile) Gerson Acevedo

Africa

Cameroon

- (Cameroon) Petrus Boumal

Congo

- (Republic of the Congo) Emmerson

Zambia

- (Zambia) **Chisamba Lungu**

== Managers ==
- (Russia) Pavel Gusev (2003–04)
- (Russia) Aleksandr Pobegalov (2005–09)
- (Russia) Vladimir Fedotov (2009–10)
- (Russia) Boris Stukalov (2010)
- (Kazakhstan) Dmitriy Ogai (2011)
- (Russia) Yuri Matveyev (2011)
- (Russia) Aleksandr Pobegalov (2012)
- (Russia) Sergei Bulatov (2012)
- (Russia) Pavel Gusev (2012–13)
- (Russia) Oleg Vasilenko (2013)
- (Russia) Aleksandr Tarkhanov (2013–15)
- (Belarus) Viktor Goncharenko (2015)
- (Belarus) Vadim Skripchenko (2015–2016)

== Honours ==
=== Domestic ===
- Soviet Second League / Russian Football National League
  - Champions (2): 1990, 2012–13
- Russian Second Division
  - Champions (2): 2002, 2004
- Russian Cup
  - Runners-up (2): 2016–17, 2018–19

=== Invitational ===
- ANFA Cup
  - Champions (1): 1989
