= 2024 Lithuanian Football Cup =

Tournament details
- Country: Lithuania
- Teams: 52

Final positions
- Champions: Banga
- Runners-up: Hegelmann

2024 LFF Cup Final Banga-Hegelmann

The 2024 Lithuanian Football Cup, for sponsorship reasons from this season, was also called Lithuanian: FPRO LFF Taurė was a single elimination football tournament in Lithuania. The winners qualified for the 2025–26 UEFA Conference League second qualifying round on a sporting merit (subject to receiving an UEFA licence). TransINVEST were the defending cup holders.

Banga won the cup on 29 September 2024 (their first Lithuanian Cup win), defeating Hegelmann 4–1 on penalties after a 0–0 draw.

== Draw and match calendar ==
The format was the same, as a previous year. As before, the "B" teams do not participate in the cup competition. The A lyga teams entered the tournament from the second round. A total number of participants this year was 52: 10 A lyga clubs, 11 LFF I lyga clubs, 13 LFF II lyga clubs, 9 LFF III lyga clubs and 9 SFL clubs.

Round	Draw dates	Match dates	Teams	Participants
Round I	April 11	April 19–23	40	Clubs from I, II, III ir SFL leagues
Round of 32	April 24	May 3–7	32	20 Round I winners, 2 teams drawn without competition, and 10 A lyga teams
Round of 16	May 10	May 21–30	16	Winners of the Round of 32
Quarter-finals	June 21	August 6-27	8	Winners of the Round of 16

== Round I ==
The following teams received byes:

- I lyga: Nevėžis
- II lyga: Sveikata

Team 1	Score	Team 2
19 April 2024
Venta (III lyga)	0–4	BFA (I lyga)
Granitas (III lyga)	0–2	Be1 NFA (I lyga)
Sviedinys (SFL D)	1–2	Nemunas (II lyga)
20 April 2024
Šilutė (II lyga)	1–2 (a.e.t.)	Atmosfera (I lyga)
Fortūna (II lyga)	1–2	Viltis (II lyga)
Saned (II lyga)	0–5	Garliava (I lyga)
Ave. Ko. (SFL A)	0–8	Tauras (I lyga)
Širvėna (II lyga)	0–5	Babrungas (I lyga)
21 April 2024
Nadruvis (III lyga)	0–13	Ekranas (I lyga)
Katastrofa (SFL C)	0–10	Vilkai (III lyga)
Futboliukas (SFL C)	0–3	Minija (I lyga)
Geležinis Vilkas (SFL A)	1–5	Statyba-Sendvaris (III lyga)
Top Kickers (III lyga)	3–5 (a.e.t.)	Dembava (II lyga)
Kazlų Rūda (III lyga)	1–4	Jonava (II lyga)
AFK (III lyga)	7–0	Utenos Utenis (II lyga)
Kaišiadorys-Baltai (SFL B)	0–3	Sirijus (II lyga)
Euforija-Tirola (SFL B)	5–0	Tera (III lyga)
22 April 2024
Neptūnas (I lyga)	1–3	Riteriai (I lyga)
23 April 2024
Utenos Utena (SFL D)	0–9	Klaipėdos (II lyga)
Trivartis (SFL C)	1–10	Ukmergė (II lyga)

== Round of 32 ==
Team 1	Score	Team 2
3 May 2024
Euforija-Tirola (SFL B)	1–11	TransINVEST (A lyga)
4 May 2024
Statyba-Sendvaris (III lyga)	1–5	Jonava (II lyga)
5 May 2024
Sirijus (II lyga)	2–5	Džiugas (A lyga)
Dembava (II lyga)	3–4	Babrungas (I lyga)
AFK (III lyga)	1–1 (6–7 p)	Klaipėdos (II lyga)
6 May 2024
Dainava (A lyga)	0–2	Hegelmann (A lyga)
Žalgiris (A lyga)	2–1	Panevėžys (A lyga)
Vilkai (III lyga)	1–2	Ukmergė (II lyga)
7 May 2024
Tauras (I lyga)	0–4	Šiauliai (A lyga)
Riteriai (I lyga)	3–5 (a.e.t.)	Banga (A lyga)
Minija (I lyga)	1–1 (3–5 p)	Sūduva (A lyga)
Garliava (I lyga)	0–5	Kauno Žalgiris (A lyga)
Nemunas (II lyga)	3–1	Sveikata (II lyga)
Be1 NFA (I lyga)	0–1	Ekranas (I lyga)
Atmosfera (I lyga)	6–0	BFA (I lyga)
8 May 2024
Viltis (II lyga)	1–2 (a.e.t.)	Nevėžis (I lyga)

== Round of 16 ==
Team 1	Score	Team 2
21 May 2024
Šiauliai (A lyga)	1–1 (7–6 p)	Sūduva (A lyga)
22 May 2024
Klaipėdos (II lyga)	1–4	Banga (A lyga)
Jonava (II lyga)	0–2	Atmosfera (I lyga)
28 May 2024
Nevėžis (I lyga)	2–1	Ekranas (I lyga)
Babrungas (I lyga)	2–3	Hegelmann (A lyga)
Ukmergė (II lyga)	1–2	Džiugas (A lyga)
29 May 2024
Nemunas (II lyga)	0–7	Kauno Žalgiris (A lyga)
30 May 2024
TransINVEST (A lyga)	2–1	Žalgiris (A lyga)

== Quarter-finals ==
Team 1	Score	Team 2
6 August
Atmosfera (I lyga)	0–4	Hegelmann (A lyga)
13 August
Nevėžis (I lyga)	0–5	Banga (A lyga)
21 August
Kauno Žalgiris (A lyga)	3–1	Šiauliai (A lyga)
27 August
TransINVEST (A lyga)	1–2	Džiugas (A lyga)

== Semi-finals ==
Team 1	Score	Team 2
18 September
Kauno Žalgiris (A lyga)	0–1	Banga (A lyga)
Džiugas (A lyga)	1–2	Hegelmann (A lyga)

== Final ==
29 September 2024
15:00

Banga	0–0 (a.e.t.)	Hegelmann
Penalties
Januševskij (penalty scored); Ramanauskas (penalty scored); Vėževičius (penalty scored); Antužis (penalty scored)	4—1	(penalty missed) Brisola; (penalty scored) Figueredo; (penalty missed) Armalas

Darius and Girėnas Stadium, Kaunas
Attendance: 5,000
Referee: Orestas Abramavičius

== See also ==
- 2024 A Lyga
