= 2023 LFF I Lyga =

I Lyga
- Season: 2023
- Champions: TransINVEST
- Promoted: TransINVEST
- Relegated: Jonava; Marijampolė City; Riteriai B Žalgiris B
- Conference League: TransINVEST

The 2023 LFF I Lyga was the 34th season of I Lyga, the second tier football league of Lithuania.

The champions (TransINVEST) were promoted to A Lyga, and also qualified for the 2024–25 UEFA Conference League second qualifying round by winning the 2023 Lithuanian Football Cup. The runners-up (Be1 NFA) qualified for the A Lyga play-off. The fourteenth-placed team (Panevėžys B) qualified for the I Lyga play-off, winning to retain their place in the league. The bottom two teams (Jonava and Žalgiris B) were relegated to the 2024 LF II Lyga, alongside Marijampolė City (who withdrew from the league) and Riteriai B (after Riteriai were relegated from the 2023 A Lyga.)

== Teams ==
=== Team changes ===
Promoted from 2022 II Lyga	Promoted to 2023 A Lyga	Relegated from 2022 A Lyga	Relegated to 2023 II Lyga
Kauno Žalgiris B TransINVEST	Dainava	Jonava	Atmosfera; Banga B

=== Participants ===
Team	Town	Stadium	Capacity
Babrungas	Plungė	Plungė Stadium	500
Baltijos Futbolo Akademija	Vilnius	Širvintų stadionas	500
Be1 NFA	Kaunas	NFA Stadium	300
Ekranas	Panevėžys	Žemynos stadionas	
Garliava	Garliava	Stadium of the school of Adomas Mitkus	500
Jonava	Jonava	Central Stadium of Jonava	2,040
Kauno Žalgiris B	Kaunas	Kauno Žalgirio FA stadionas	500
Marijampolė City	Marijampolė		
Minija	Kretinga	Kretingos miesto stadionas	1,000
Neptūnas	Klaipėda	Klaipėdos dirbtinės dangos aikštė	1,000
Nevėžis	Kėdainiai	Kėdainių miesto centrinis stadionas	3,000
Panevėžys B	Panevėžys	Žemynos progimnazijos stadionas	500
Riteriai B	Vilnius	LFF Stadium	5,400
Šiauliai B	Šiauliai	Šiaulių stadionas	9,125
TransINVEST	Vilnius		
Žalgiris B	Vilnius	LFF Stadium	5,400

== League table ==
Pos	Team	Pld	W	D	L	GF	GA	GD	Pts	Promotion, qualification or relegation
1	TransINVEST (C, P)	30	22	4	4	83	29	+54	70	Promotion to A Lyga and qualification for the Conference League second qualifying round (Note: TransINVEST qualified for the Conference League second qualifying round by winning the 2023 Lithuanian Football Cup.)
2	Be1 NFA	30	17	5	8	51	30	+21	56	Qualification for the A Lyga play-off
3	Nevėžis	30	14	9	7	47	32	+15	51	
4	Neptūnas	30	14	9	7	57	33	+24	51	
5	Babrungas	30	15	6	9	60	49	+11	51	
6	Minija	30	15	6	9	45	37	+8	51	
7	Riteriai B (Note: Riterai B were relegated after their main team, Riteriai, were relegated to I Lyga from the 2023 A Lyga.) (R)	30	13	7	10	49	33	+16	46	Relegation to II Lyga
8	Garliava	30	9	13	8	43	37	+6	40	
9	Ekranas	30	11	6	13	42	49	−7	39	
10	Baltijos Futbolo Akademija	30	10	8	12	40	41	−1	38	
11	Marijampolė City	30	11	2	17	27	64	−37	35	Club withdrew
12	Šiauliai B	30	9	6	15	47	66	−19	33	
13	Kauno Žalgiris B	30	8	8	14	40	49	−9	32	
14	Panevėžys B (O)	30	8	7	15	45	59	−14	31	Qualification for the I Lyga play-off
15	Žalgiris B (R)	30	7	7	16	46	66	−20	28	Relegation to II Lyga
16	Jonava (R)	30	4	3	23	28	76	−48	15	Relegation to II Lyga

Source: Soccerway
Rules for classification: 1) Points; 2) Play-off (only for deciding promotion); 3) Head-to-head points; 4) Head-to-head goal difference; 5) Head-to-head goals scored; 6) Matches won; 7) Goal difference; 8) Goals scored;
(C) Champions; (O) Play-off winners; (P) Promoted; (R) Relegated

== I Lyga play-off ==
The fourteenth-placed club (Panevėžys B) faced the third-placed club from the 2023 LFF II Lyga (Hegelmann B) for the final place in the following season's I Lyga.

=== First leg ===
15 November 2023	Hegelmann B	2–1	Panevėžys B	Kaunas
17:00 BST				Stadium: LFF Kaunas Training Centre

=== Second leg ===
21 November 2023	Panevėžys B	4–1 (a.e.t.) (5–3 agg.)	Hegelmann B	Panevėžys
17:00 BST				Stadium: Aukštaitija Stadium

== See also ==
- 2023 A Lyga
- 2023 II Lyga
- 2023 Lithuanian Football Cup
- Football in Lithuania
