= 2020 Lithuanian Football Cup =

Hegelmann LFF Taurė

Tournament details
- Country: Lithuania
- Dates: 16 June – 24 October
- Teams: 33

Final positions
- Champions: FK Panevėžys (1st title)
- Runners-up: FK Sūduva
- Semifinalists: FK Žalgiris; FK Riteriai

Tournament statistics
- Matches played: 32
- Goals scored: 118 (3.69 per match)

The 2020 Lithuanian Football Cup was a single elimination association football tournament and the 32rd edition of the Lithuanian annual football knock-out tournament. The official name of thecompetition was Hegelmann LFF Cup for sponsorship reasons.

The tournament was scheduled to start in April 2020. However, due to the COVID-19 pandemic, the start was postponed to mid-June.

A total of 33 A Lyga, LFF I Lyga and II Lyga teams participated in the tournament, reserve teams are not allowed to participate in the cup competition. The A Lyga teams joined the tournament in the round of 16. Due to the postponed start, the teams of lower divisions were not invited to participate this year in order to shorten the length of the competition.

FK Panevėžys defeated defending champions FK Sūduva 5–4 on penalties in the final and have qualified for the first qualifying round of the 2020–21 UEFA Europa League.

== Match and draw calendar ==
| Stage | Draw | Matches | Teams | Participants |
|---|---|---|---|---|
| Preliminary Round I | 3 June | 16-21 June | 25 | 17 teams from II Lyga, 8 randomly drawn teams from LFF I lyga |
| Preliminary Round II | 22 June | 24-30 June | 16 | 9 winners of Round I, 7 randomly drawn teams advanced without play |
| 1/8 final | 2 July | 7-8 and 14-15 July | 16 | 8 winners of Round II, 6 teams from A lyga, 2 randomly drawn teams from LFF I lyga advanced without play |
| 1/4 final | 17 July | 11 August and 11-12 September | | |
| 1/2 final | 15 September | 17 October and 20 October | | |
| Final | | 24 October | | |

== Participants ==
The 33 participants consisted of 6 A Lyga, 10 LFF I Lyga and 17 II Lyga teams.

A lyga
FK Banga Gargždai
FK Kauno Žalgiris
FK Panevėžys
FK Riteriai
FK Sūduva Marijampolė
FK Žalgiris

I lyga
FK Atmosfera (2012)
BFA
DFK Dainava
FC Hegelmann Litauen
FK Jonava
FC Džiugas
FK Minija (2017)
Nevėžis
FA Šiauliai
Vilniaus Vytis

II lyga
FK Šilas Kazlų Rūda
FK Aukštaitija
FK Sveikata Kybartai
FK Vidzgiris Alytus
FK Utenis Utena
FK Tauras Tauragė
FSK Radviliškis
FK Šilutė
FK Babrungas Plungė
SANED Joniškis
FK Juventa-99 Šiauliai
FK Neptūnas Klaipėda
FK Rosa Klaipėda
FK Atlantas Klaipėda
FK TERA Vilnius
FK Viltis Vilnius
FM Ateitis Vilnius

== Results ==
=== Preliminary Round I ===
The league that the team represents is indicated in brackets.
Note: FK Aukštaitija changed the club's name to FK Ekranas.

| Team 1 | Score | Team 2 |
|---|---|---|
| BFA (I) | 1–0 | FK Nevėžis Kėdainiai (I) |
| FK TERA Vilnius (II) | 2–4 | FK Atmosfera (2012) (I) |
| FK Tauras Tauragė (II) | 4–0 | FK Rosa Klaipėda (II) |
| FK Juventa-99 Šiauliai (II) | 2–2 (2–4 p) | FK Vidzgiris Alytus (II) |
| FK Šilas Kazlų Rūda (II) | 5–1 | FK Neptūnas Klaipėda (II) |
| FK Šilutė (II) | 1–3 | FC Džiugas Telšiai (I) |
| FK Ekranas (2020) Panevėžys (II) | 1–1 (3–4 p) | DFK Dainava (I) |
| FK Utenis (II) | 1–1 (4–2 p) | FK Atlantas Klaipėda (II) |
| FM Ateitis Vilnius (II) | 0–4 | FK Minija (2017) (I) |

Randomly drawn teams that advanced to Round II:

FK Viltis Vilnius (II)
Vilniaus Vytis (I)
FK Babrungas Plungė (II)
FK Jonava (I)
SANED Joniškis (II)
FK Sveikata Kybartai (II)
ŠŠPC Radviliškis (II)

Randomly drawn I Lyga teams that advanced to the round of 16:

FC Hegelmann Litauen
FA Šiauliai

=== Round II ===
The second round draw took place on 22 June 2020.

| Team 1 | Score | Team 2 |
|---|---|---|
| FK Viltis Vilnius (II) | 11–0 | SANED Joniškis (II) |
| DFK Dainava (I) | 3–0 | FK Atmosfera (2012) (I) |
| FK Vidzgiris Alytus (II) | 2–6 | FK Minija (2017) (I) |
| FK Šilas Kazlų Rūda (II) | 2–3 | BFA (I) |
| FK Utenis (II) | 0–2 | FK Sveikata Kybartai (II) |
| ŠŠPC Radviliškis (II) | 1–5 | FK Jonava (I) |
| FK Babrungas Plungė (II) | 2–1 | FK Tauras Tauragė (II) |
| Vilniaus Vytis (I) | 1–0 | FC Džiugas Telšiai (I) |

=== Round of 16 ===
The Round of 16 draw took place on 2 July 2020.

| Team 1 | Score | Team 2 |
|---|---|---|
| BFA (I) | 1–2 | DFK Dainava (I) |
| FK Sveikata Kybartai (II) | 0–4 | FK Kauno Žalgiris (A) |
| FK Viltis Vilnius (II) | 0–4 | Vilniaus Vytis (I) |
| FA Šiauliai (I) | 0–2 | FK Žalgiris (A) |
| FK Jonava (I) | 0–3 | FK Panevėžys (A) |
| FK Minija (2017) (I) | 0–3 | FK Sūduva (A) |
| FK Riteriai (A) | 2–0 | FK Banga Gargždai (A) |
| FK Babrungas Plungė (II) | 1–4 | FC Hegelmann Litauen (I) |

=== Quarter-finals ===
The 1/4 Final draw took place on 17 July 2020

| Team 1 | Score | Team 2 |
|---|---|---|
| FC Hegelmann Litauen (I) | 0–3 | FK Panevėžys (A) |
| Vilniaus Vytis (I) | 0–3 | FK Sūduva (A) |
| DFK Dainava (I) | 0–2 | FK Riteriai (A) |
| FK Žalgiris (A) | 2–1 | FK Kauno Žalgiris (A) |

=== Semi-finals ===
| Team 1 | Score | Team 2 |
|---|---|---|
| FK Panevėžys (A) | 4–0 | FK Riteriai (A) |
| FK Žalgiris (A) | 1–2 | FK Sūduva (A) |

=== Final ===
The final was broadcast on the Lithuanian TV3 channel for the first time.

24 October 2020
14:43 EEST
FINAL

| FK Panevėžys | 1–1 (a.e.t.) | FK Sūduva |
|---|---|---|
| Ernestas Veliulis 23' | lff.lt report Report | 26' (pen.) Renan Oliveira; (yellow card) 68' (yellow-red card) 117' Nicolás Gorobsov |
Penalties
| Elivelto (penalty scored); Chrysovalantis Kozoronis (penalty scored); Rafael Floro (penalty scored); Justinas Januševskij (penalty scored); Sebastián Vásquez (penalty scored) | 5–4 | (penalty scored) Domagoj Pušić; (penalty scored) Algis Jankauskas; (penalty scored) Thomas Salamon; (penalty scored) Yevhen Yefremov; (penalty missed) Aleksandar Živanović |

Aukštaitija Stadium, Panevėžys
Attendance: 1,000
Referee: Robertas Valikonis

| FK Panevėžys | FK Sūduva |

== See also ==
- 2020 A Lyga
- 2020 LFF I Lyga
- Football in Lithuania
