= 2018 II Lyga =

II Lyga
- Season: 2018

The 2018 II Lyga season was the second season since return to two divisions system, the twentieth after switch to spring-to-fall format and the thirtieth overall after the restoration of Independence.

The II Lyga is the third-tier of football in Lithuania. It is divided into the South Zone and the West Zone, each containing a total of thirteen clubs. The top two teams from each division are promoted to the I Lyga, while the last placed teams from both divisions are relegated to the appropriate regional division of the III Lyga, except in separately regulated cases for the B teams of higher tier clubs.

== II Lyga South Zone ==
II Lyga South Zone
- Season: 2018
- Champions: Hegelmann Litauen
- Promoted: Hegelmann Litauen, Baltijos Futbolo Akademija
- Matches: 156
- Goals: 712 (4.56 per match)
- Top goalscorer: Matas Gudaitis (24 goals)
- Biggest home win: Sūduva B 15–0 Panerys (10 October 2018)
- Biggest away win: Panerys 0–14 Hegelmann Litauen (7 November 2018)
- Highest scoring: Sūduva B 15–0 Panerys (10 October 2018)
- Highest attendance: 200; Šilas v Sveikata (30 June 2018)
- Total attendance: 7,190
- Average attendance: 48
- All statistics correct as of 29 November 2018.

=== League table ===
Pos	Team	Pld	W	D	L	GF	GA	GD	Pts	
1	Hegelmann Litauen (C, P)	24	19	2	3	83	25	+58	59 (Note: According to section 11 of the Lithuanian Football Federation Championships Regulations, 2018 Edition, an extra match was played to determine the II Lyga South Zone champions. The match was played on 24 November 2018 and was won by Hegelmann Litauen who became league champions.)	Promotion to LFF I Lyga
2	Šilas	24	19	2	3	67	30	+37	59	
3	Sveikata	24	17	1	6	69	31	+38	52	
4	Nevėžis B	24	13	1	10	70	46	+24	40	Ineligible for promotion
5	Viltis	24	10	6	8	41	33	+8	36	
6	Sūduva B	24	11	2	11	70	49	+21	35	Ineligible for relegation
7	FM Ateitis	24	10	4	10	64	50	+14	34	
8	Baltijos Futbolo Akademija (P)	24	10	2	12	46	58	−12	32	Promotion to LFF I Lyga
9	Kauno Žalgiris B	24	8	4	12	52	65	−13	28	Ineligible for relegation
10	Jonava B	24	6	6	12	39	62	−23	24	Club folded after end of season
11	DFK Dainava B	24	6	2	16	53	66	−13	20	Club folded after end of season
12	Panerys	24	6	0	18	30	136	−106	18	Club folded after end of season
13	TERA	24	4	2	18	28	61	−33	14	

Source: Lietuvos Futbolas (in Lithuanian)
Rules for classification: 1) Points; 2) Play-off (only if deciding champion when two teams tied) 3) Head-to-head points; 4) Head-to-head goal difference; 5) Head-to-head goals scored; 6) Head-to-head matches won; 7) Goal difference; 8) Goals scored; 9) Matches won.
(C) Champions; (P) Promoted

=== Results ===
Home \ Away	ATE	BFA	DFB	HGL	JNB	KŽB	NVB	PNE	SDB	SVK	ŠIL	TER	VLT
FM Ateitis	—	1–3	3–1	4–1	2–2	2–5	1–4	13–1	1–1	0–4	5–2	5–2	1–1
Baltijos Futbolo Akademija	0–3	—	1–1	0–2	1–1	0–6	2–0	2–5	3–0	4–3	0–4	1–0	3–1
DFK Dainava B	2–4	0–3	—	2–3	8–0	2–2	1–3	3–0 (Note: Panerys received a 0–3 technical loss in an away game against DFK Dainava B due to violation of regulations.)	6–0	3–6	1–2	1–2	1–0
Hegelmann Litauen	4–1	3–0	7–1	—	4–1	5–0	3–1	4–2	5–0	1–1	1–2	5–0	2–1
Jonava B	2–1	1–0	2–5	1–3	—	2–2	2–2	3–0 (Note: Panerys received a 0–3 technical loss in an away game against Jonava B due to violation of regulations.)	1–2	2–3	1–4	1–0	3–2
Kauno Žalgiris B	0–3 (Note: Kauno Žalgiris B received a 0–3 technical loss in a home game against Ateitis due to violation of regulations. The original match ended in a 4–2 victory for Kauno Žalgiris B.)	2–3	5–2	3–3	4–3	—	0–1	0–4	3–2	0–2	0–2	2–1	2–0
Nevėžis B	1–3	4–0	6–1	1–4	7–2	6–3	—	3–0 (Note: Panerys received a 0–3 technical loss in an away game against Nevėžis B due to violation of regulations.)	5–2	2–3	4–2	3–1	0–4
Panerys	2–1	1–12	0–9	0–14	2–5	0–7	1–10	—	0–8	4–2	2–6	1–0	4–1
Sūduva B	2–3	11–1	5–0	1–0	2–0	7–2	3–2	15–0	—	0–3	1–2	5–2	1–1
Sveikata	4–3	3–0	6–1	0–1	3–2	4–0	2–1	3–0	3–1	—	1–2	5–0	3–0
Šilas	3–2	2–1	3–1	0–2	3–0	6–2	2–0	7–1	3–0	2–1	—	3–2	0–0
TERA	0–0	2–5	1–0	2–4	1–1	4–1	2–3	3–0 (Note: Panerys received a 0–3 technical loss in an away game against TERA due to violation of regulations.)	0–1	0–3	1–4	—	0–3
Viltis	3–2	2–1	2–1	1–2	1–1	1–1	2–1	5–0	3–0	2–1	1–1	4–2	—

Source: Lietuvos Futbolas (in Lithuanian)
Legend: Blue = home team win; Yellow = draw; Red = away team win.

=== Gold Match ===
Since Hegelmann Litauen and Šilas finished level on points at the end of the season, a "Gold Match" on neutral pitch will be played to decide the title.

24 November 2017
18:00 EET (UTC+2)

Hegelmann Litauen	4–3	Šilas
Ugnius Lekečinskas 12'; Deividas Stradalovas 42'; Benas Olencevičius 71'; Donatas Stulga 79'	Report	Gytis Urba 29'; Andrius Lukšys 67'; Tadas Lekeckas 85'

ARVI Indoor Arena, Marijampolė, Lithuania
Attendance: 126
Referee: Gediminas Mažeika

=== Attendance ===
Pos	Team	Total	High	Low	Average	Change
1	Šilas	1,209	200	39	101	n/a
2	Sveikata	1,174	147	70	98	n/a
3	Hegelmann Litauen	678	103	30	57	n/a
4	Jonava B	534	100	28	54	n/a^{1}
5	FM Ateitis	513	100	11	47	n/a^{2}
6	Nevėžis B	487	72	18	45	n/a
7	DFK Dainava B	450	90	10	41	n/a
8	Kauno Žalgiris B	436	65	17	37	n/a
9	Sūduva B	398	75	7	34	n/a
10	Viltis	378	80	10	32	n/a
11	Baltijos Futbolo Akademija	367	75	10	31	n/a
12	TERA	290	50	5	27	n/a
12	Panerys	276	50	3	23	n/a
	League total	7,190	200	3	48	n/a^{3}

Updated to games played on complete
Source: Lietuvos Futbolas
Notes:
1: Official attendance statistic from 1 of the Jonava B home matches was not publicly released.
2: Official attendance statistic from 1 of the FM Ateitis home matches was not publicly released.
3: Official attendance statistic from 2 leagues matches was not publicly released.

== II Lyga West Zone ==
II Lyga West Zone
- Season: 2018
- Champions: Minija
- Promoted: Minija, Atmosfera, Šiauliai FA
- Matches: 132
- Goals: 508 (3.85 per match)
- Top goalscorer: Tomas Birškys (34 goals)
- Biggest home win: Džiugas B 10–1 Saned (9 September 2018)
- Biggest away win: Banga B 0–8 Atmosfera (12 May 2018); Saned 0–8 Akmenės Cementas (16 September 2018)
- Highest scoring: Džiugas B 10–1 Saned (9 September 2018)
- Highest attendance: 300; Minija v Gargždų Pramogos SC (6 May 2018)
- Total attendance: 6,377
- Average attendance: 56
- All statistics correct as of 3 November 2018.

=== League table ===
Pos	Team	Pld	W	D	L	GF	GA	GD	Pts	
1	Minija (C, P)	22	14	6	2	65	20	+45	48 (Note: According to section 11 of the Lithuanian Football Federation Championships Regulations, 2018 Edition, an extra match was played to determine the II Lyga West Zone champions. The match was played on 13 October 2018 and was won by Minija who became league champions.)	Promotion to LFF I Lyga
2	Babrungas	22	16	0	6	62	39	+23	48	
3	Atmosfera (P)	22	13	2	7	59	27	+32	41 (Note: Atmosfera ahead of Gargždų Pramogos SC on goal difference.)	Promotion to LFF I Lyga
4	Gargždų Pramogos SC	22	12	5	5	44	22	+22	41	Club folded after end of season
5	Palanga B	22	12	1	9	39	32	+7	37	Ineligible for relegation
6	Šiauliai FA (P)	22	11	1	10	54	47	+7	34	Promotion to LFF I Lyga
7	Šilutė	22	7	7	8	38	47	−9	28	
8	Širvėna	22	8	3	11	28	36	−8	27	Club folded after end of season
9	Banga B	22	8	1	13	42	62	−20	25 (Note: Banga B ahead of Akmenės Cementas on head-to-head record; Akmenės Cementas–Banga B 3–1, Banga B–Akmenės Cementas 6–2.)	Ineligible for promotion
10	Akmenės Cementas	22	7	4	11	33	43	−10	25	
11	Džiugas B	22	7	0	15	31	45	−14	21	Ineligible for promotion
12	Saned	22	2	0	20	13	88	−75	6	
13	Atlantas B (Note: Atlantas B were leading the league, but failed to resolve payment of the league's starting fee and as so were disqualified on 17 July 2018, regardless of regulation that all A Lyga's clubs reserve teams are required to compete in either 2nd or 3rd tier of the Lithuanian football pyramid and are protected from relegation to the lower tiers. As club managed to play less than 50% league's matches their results were annulled. Atlantas B were given a special permission by Lithuanian Football Federation to continue their 2018 season in the III Lyga Klaipėda District. Still they are subject to return next season as main club managed to finish above relegation places in the A Lyga.) (D, R)	0	0	0	0	0	0	0	0	Disqualified, transferred to III Lyga Klaipėda District

Source: Lietuvos Futbolas (in Lithuanian)
Rules for classification: 1) Points; 2) Play-off (only if deciding champion when two teams tied) 3) Head-to-head points; 4) Head-to-head goal difference; 5) Head-to-head goals scored; 6) Head-to-head matches won; 7) Goal difference; 8) Goals scored; 9) Matches won.
(C) Champions; (D) Disqualified; (P) Promoted; (R) Relegated

=== Results ===
Home \ Away	AKC	ATB	ATM	BAB	BGB	DŽB	MIN	PLB	PRA	SAN	ŠIA	ŠLT	ŠVĖ
Akmenės Cementas	—	—	2–1	1–3	3–1	1–0	1–1	0–1	0–2	5–0	0–2	0–0	1–2
Atlantas B	—	—	—	—	—	—	—	—	—	—	—	—	—
Atmosfera	1–2	—	—	0–2	4–0	7–0	2–2	2–0	3–2	2–0	3–0	4–1	1–2
Babrungas	3–2	—	2–0	—	7–2	5–3	3–4	4–3	1–3	2–3	0–3	3–0	2–1
Banga B	6–2	—	0–8	2–1	—	4–0	1–2	2–1	2–1	2–0	1–3	2–2	5–4
Džiugas B	5–0	—	0–2	1–0	1–0	—	0–3	1–2	1–3	10–1	2–1	0–1	2–0
Minija	7–1	—	1–0	5–2	4–0	0–1	—	5–1	0–0	7–0	6–0	7–3	0–0
Palanga B	3–0	—	5–2	0–2	1–0	4–0	0–0	—	0–1	1–0	3–1	4–3	2–0
Gargždų Pramogos SC	0–0	—	1–0	1–3	5–2	2–1	0–0	4–2	—	5–0	5–0	1–1	2–3
Saned	0–8	—	1–5	0–2	1–7	3–1	0–4	0–3	0–3 (Note: Saned received a 0–3 technical loss in a home game against Gargždų Pramogos SC due to violation of regulations.)	—	1–3	2–5	0–1
Šiauliai FA	2–3	—	2–3	3–4	7–1	3–1	4–2	0–2	3–1	8–0	—	4–0	2–1
Šilutė	1–1	—	2–2	1–3	3–1	2–1	1–4	3–0	0–2	3–1	1–1	—	3–2
Širvėna	2–0	—	1–2	1–2	2–1	1–0	0–1	2–1	0–0	1–0	1–2	2–2	—

Source: Lietuvos Futbolas (in Lithuanian)
Legend: Blue = home team win; Yellow = draw; Red = away team win.

=== Gold Match ===
Since Babrungas and Minija finished level on points at the end of the season, a "Gold Match" on neutral pitch was played to decide the title.

13 October 2017
13:00 EEST (UTC+3)

Babrungas	0–5	Minija
	Report	Elzbergas 5'; Jurkaitis 15'; Grušauskas 64'; Surblys 76'; Kaliniauskas 81'

Mažeikiai Stadium, Mažeikiai, Lithuania
Attendance: 200
Referee: Donatas Rumšas

=== Attendance ===
Pos	Team	Total	High	Low	Average	Change
1	Minija	1,273	300	83	160	n/a^{1}
2	Babrungas	751	200	46	84	n/a^{2}
3	Atmosfera	657	100	12	66	n/a^{3}
4	Palanga B	655	100	30	60	n/a
5	Džiugas B	625	100	20	57	n/a
6	Širvėna	471	85	20	48	n/a^{4}
7	Šilutė	310	50	30	45	−55.9%^{5,9}
8	Gargždų Pramogos SC	302	70	17	38	n/a^{6}
9	Akmenės Cementas	338	51	18	38	n/a^{7}
10	Šiauliai FA	385	50	20	35	n/a
11	Banga B	378	51	17	35	n/a
12	Saned	232	30	10	24	n/a
	League total	6,377	300	10	56	n/a^{8}

Updated to games played on complete
Source: Lietuvos Futbolas
Notes:
1: Official attendance statistic from 3 of the Minija home matches was not publicly released.
2: Official attendance statistic from 2 of the Babrungas home matches was not publicly released.
3: Official attendance statistic from 1 of the Atmosfera home matches was not publicly released.
4: Official attendance statistic from 1 of the Širvėna home matches was not publicly released.
5: Official attendance statistic from 4 of the Šilutė home matches was not publicly released.
6: Official attendance statistic from 3 of the Gargždų Pramogos SC home matches was not publicly released.
7: Official attendance statistic from 2 of the Akmenės Cementas home matches was not publicly released.
8: Official attendance statistic from 16 leagues matches was not publicly released.
9: Team played in the I Lyga last season.

== Number of teams by counties ==
Number of teams	County	Team(s)
6	Klaipėda	Atlantas B, Banga B, Gargždų Pramogos SC, Minija, Palanga B and Šilutė
5	Vilnius	FM Ateitis, Baltijos Futbolo Akademija, Panerys, TERA and Viltis
4	Kaunas	Hegelmann Litauen, Jonava B, Kauno Žalgiris B and Nevėžis B
3	Šiauliai	Akmenės Cementas, Saned and Šiauliai FA
3	Marijampolė	Sūduva B, Sveikata and Šilas
3	Telšiai	Atmosfera, Babrungas and Džiugas B
1	Panevėžys	Širvėna
1	Alytus	DFK Dainava B
