= 2023 Lithuanian Football Cup =

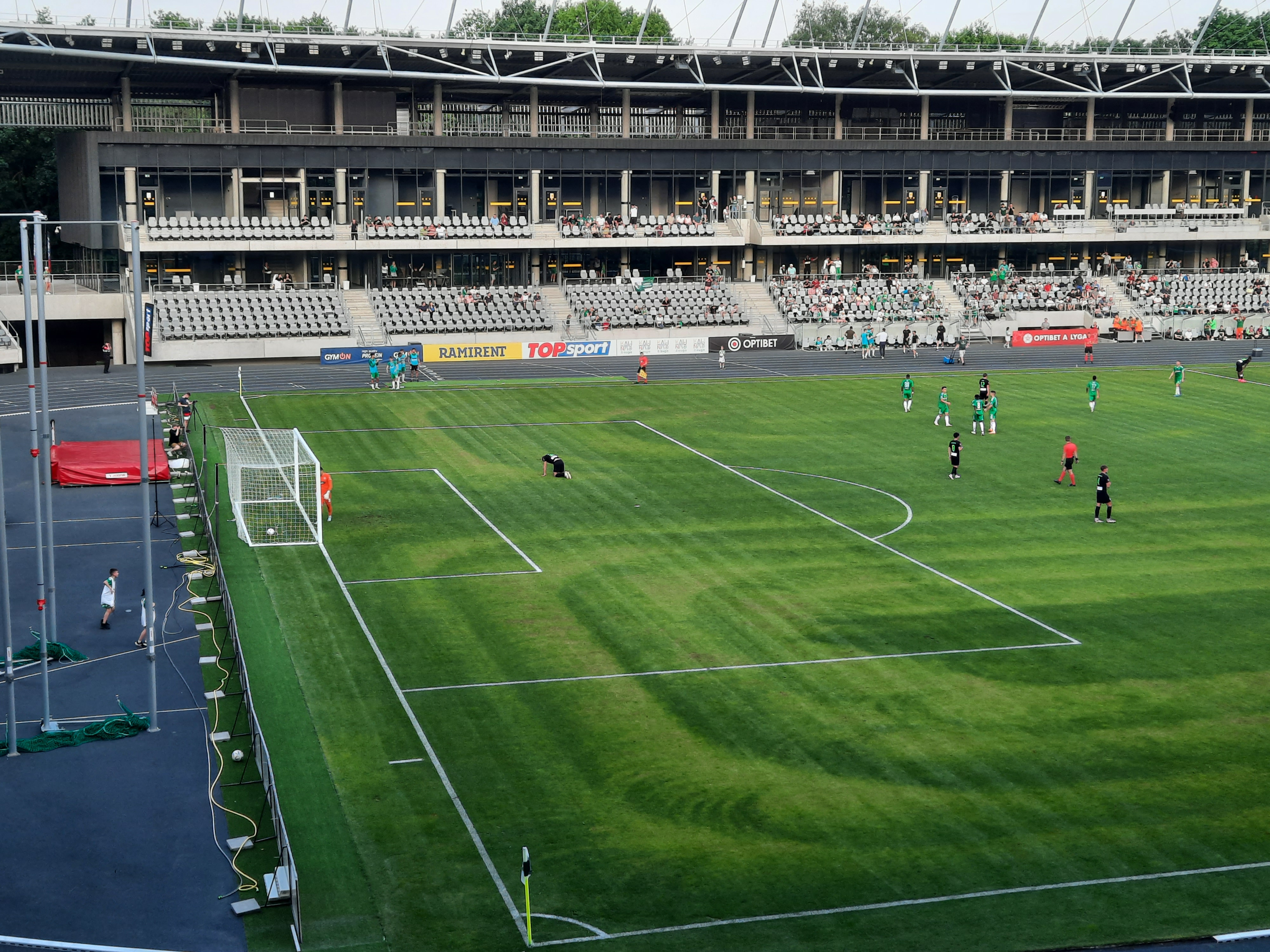
- The moments after an own goal during the round of 16 match which ended K.Žalgiris 3-0 V.Žalgiris

Tournament details
- Country: Lithuania
- Teams: 48

Final positions
- Champions: TransINVEST
- Runners-up: Šiauliai

Tournament statistics
- Matches played: 40
- Goals scored: 188 (4.7 per match)

The 2023 Lithuanian Football Cup, for sponsorship reasons also called Lithuanian: Hegelmann LFF Taurė was a single elimination football tournament in Lithuania. The winners qualified for the 2024–25 UEFA Conference League second qualifying round on a sporting merit (subject to receiving an UEFA licence).

TransINVEST won the cup on 1 October 2023 with a 2–1 win over Šiauliai.

== Draw and match calendar ==
Having had participants numbers limited to the first three tiers for the last two years, this year's tournament was open to clubs from any division. As before, the "B" teams do not participate in the cup competition. The A lyga teams entered the tournament from the second round this year. A total number of participants this year was 48: 10 A lyga clubs, 11 LFF I lyga clubs, 10 LFF II lyga clubs, 13 LFF III lyga clubs and 4 SFL clubs.

Round	Draw dates	Match dates	Teams	Participants
Round I	April 13	April 18–25	32	Clubs from I, II, III ir SFL leagues
Round of 32	April 28	May 5–9	32	16 Round I winners, 6 teams drawn without competition, and 10 A lyga teams
Round of 16	May 12	May 23–31	16	Winners of the Round of 32
Quarter-finals	June 17	August 15–29	8	Winners of the Round of 16
Semi-finals	August 17	September 9–17	4	Winners of the Quarterfinals
Final		October 1	2	Winners of the Semifinals

== Round I ==
The following teams received byes:

- I lyga: TransINVEST
- III lyga: AFK, Ataka, Navigatoriai, and Vova
- SFL C: Trivartis

Team 1	Score	Team 2
18 April 2023
Top Kickers (SFL A)	0–1	Fortūna (II lyga)
22 April 2023
Granitas (III lyga)	2–1	Šturmas (III lyga)
Sirijus (III lyga)	1–8	Neptūnas (I lyga)
23 April 2023
Pabradė Zina (SFL A)	0–4	Klaipėdos (II lyga)
24 April 2023
Vilkai (III lyga)	0–4	Nevėžis Kėdainiai (I lyga)
25 April 2023
Baltijos Futbolo Akademija (I lyga)	2–0	Ekranas (I lyga)
Minija (I lyga)	0–2	Be1 NFA (I lyga)
Saned (II lyga)	0–8	Babrungas Plungė (I lyga)
Tera (III lyga)	1–4	Šilutė (II lyga)
Ukmergė (II lyga)	2–0	Sveikata Kybartai (II lyga)
Tauras Tauragė (II lyga)	1–2	Viltis (II lyga)
Statyba-Sendvaris (III lyga)	2–7	Garliava (I lyga)
26 April 2023
Futboliukas (SFL C)	1–8	Atmosfera (II lyga)
Geležinis Vilkas (III lyga)	1–10	Jonava (I lyga)
Nadruvis (III lyga)	1–9	Marijampolė City (I lyga)
Venta (III lyga)	2–3 (a.e.t.)	Dembava (II lyga)

== Round of 32 ==
Team 1	Score	Team 2
3 May 2023
Trivartis (SFL C)	0–8	Navigatoriai (III lyga)
5 May 2023
Granitas (III lyga)	1–2	Viltis (II lyga)
6 May 2023
Garliava (I lyga)	1–2	Be1 NFA (I lyga)
TransINVEST (I lyga)	5–1	Nevėžis Kėdainiai (I lyga)
Klaipėdos (II lyga)	3–0	Jonava (I lyga)
7 May 2023
Šiauliai (A lyga)	2–1	Dainava (A lyga)
Babrungas (I lyga)	0–3	Banga (A lyga)
Ataka (III lyga)	0–9	Riteriai (A lyga)
Neptūnas (I lyga)	1–1 (3–1 p)	Panevėžys (A lyga)
AFK (III lyga)	0–6	Žalgiris (A lyga)
Vova (III lyga)	w/o	Marijampolė City (I lyga)
8 May 2023
Dembava (II lyga)	0–6	Kauno Žalgiris (A lyga)
9 May 2023
Atmosfera (II lyga)	0–4	Hegelmann (A lyga)
Šilutė (II lyga)	0–5	Džiugas (A lyga)
Ukmergė (II lyga)	0–3	Sūduva (A lyga)
10 May 2023
Fortūna (II lyga)	0–6	Baltijos Futbolo Akademija (I lyga)

== Round of 16 ==
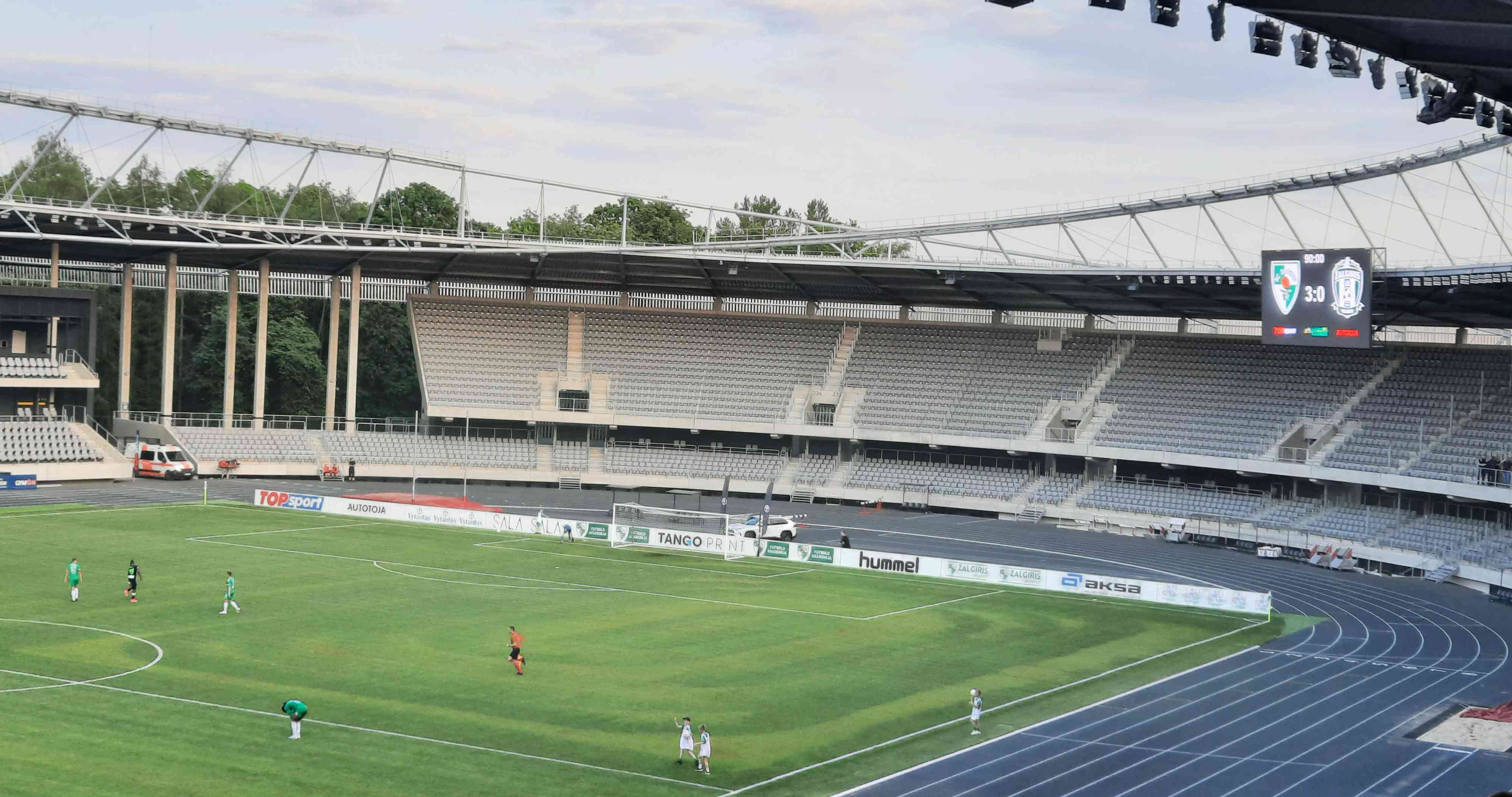
Kauno Žalgiris eliminated the defending champions Žalgiris

Team 1	Score	Team 2
23 May 2023
Marijampolė City (I lyga)	1–4	Banga (A lyga)
24 May 2023
Kauno Žalgiris (A lyga)	3–0	Žalgiris (A lyga)
Hegelmann (A lyga)	0–3	Riteriai (A lyga)
30 May 2023
Be1 NFA (I lyga)	0–2	Šiauliai (A lyga)
Viltis (II lyga)	1–6	Džiugas (A lyga)
Neptūnas (I lyga)	0–2	Sūduva (A lyga)
31 May 2023
Klaipėdos (II lyga)	1–2	Baltijos Futbolo Akademija (I lyga)
Navigatoriai (III lyga)	0–3	TransINVEST (I lyga)

== Quarter-finals ==
Team 1	Score	Team 2
15 August 2023
Džiugas (A lyga)	0–0 (4–3 p)	Sūduva (A lyga)
16 August 2023
Baltijos Futbolo Akademija (I lyga)	0–5	Kauno Žalgiris (A lyga)
TransINVEST (I lyga)	2–1 (a.e.t.)	Banga (A lyga)
29 August 2023
Šiauliai (A lyga)	2–0	Riteriai (A lyga)

== Semi-finals ==
Team 1	Score	Team 2
9 September 2023
TransINVEST (I lyga)	1–0	Džiugas (A lyga)
17 September 2023
Šiauliai (A lyga)	3–1 (a.e.t.)	Kauno Žalgiris (A lyga)

== Final ==
1 October 2023
15:30

TransINVEST	2–1	Šiauliai
Kawachi 54'; Zingertas 80'		Jankauskas 41'

Darius and Girėnas Stadium, Kaunas
Attendance: 8764
Referee: Donatas Rumšas

== See also ==
- 2023 A Lyga
