= 2024 A Lyga =

A Lyga
- Season: 2024
- Dates: 1 March – 9 November 2024
- Champions: Žalgiris
- Relegated: TransINVEST
- Champions League: Žalgiris
- Conference League: Banga; Hegelmann; Kauno Žalgiris
- Top goalscorer: Liviu Antal (20 goals)

The 2024 A Lyga, for sponsorship reasons also called TOPsport A Lyga, was the 35th season of the A Lyga, the top-tier football league of Lithuania. The season began on 1 March 2024 and ended on 9 November 2024.

The winners (Žalgiris) qualified for the 2025–26 Champions League first qualifying round. The runners-up (Hegelmann), third-placed team (Kauno Žalgiris), and 2024 Lithuanian Football Cup winners (Banga) qualified for the 2025–26 Conference League first qualifying round. The ninth-placed team (Sūduva) qualified for the A Lyga play-off, winning and retaining their place in the league. The bottom-placed team (TransINVEST) were relegated to the 2025 LFF I Lyga.

== Teams ==
The league consisted of ten teams; the top nine teams from the previous season, and one team promoted from the LFF I Lyga. Panevėžys entered the season as defending champions.

TransINVEST were promoted as champions of the 2023 LFF I Lyga, replacing the 2023 A Lyga bottom-placed team (Riteriai).

Locations of the 2024 A Lyga teams

2024 A Lyga competitors
Club	Location	Stadium	Surface	Capacity	Seasons in A Lyga	Position in 2023
Banga	Gargždai	Gargždai Stadium	Artificial	2,323	11	6th
DFK Dainava	Alytus	Alytus Stadium	Natural	3,726	13	8th
DFK Dainava	Marijampolė	Marijampolė Football Indoor Arena	Artificial	2,660	13	8th
Džiugas	Telšiai	Telšiai Central Stadium	Natural	2,320	4	9th
Džiugas	Telšiai	Ateitis Progymnasium Stadium	Artificial	300	4	9th
Hegelmann	Kaunas	LFF Kaunas Training Center Stadium	Artificial	500	4	5th
Kauno Žalgiris	Kaunas	Darius and Girėnas Stadium	Hybrid	15,315	10	4th
Kauno Žalgiris	Akademija	VDU Stadium	Artificial	1,000	10	4th
Panevėžys	Panevėžys	Aukštaitija Stadium	Natural	6,600	6	1st
Panevėžys	Panevėžys	Žemyna Progymnasium Stadium	Artificial	620	6	1st
FA Šiauliai	Šiauliai	Savivaldybė Stadium	Natural	4,000	3	3rd
FA Šiauliai	Šiauliai	Gytariai Stadium	Artificial	500	3	3rd
Sūduva	Marijampolė	Marijampolė Football Arena	Natural	6,250	22	7th
Sūduva	Marijampolė	Marijampolė Football Indoor Arena	Artificial	2,660	22	7th
TransINVEST	Vilnius	Širvintų miesto stadionas		1,000	0	1st in I Lyga
Žalgiris	Vilnius	LFF Stadium	Artificial	5,067	23	2nd
Žalgiris	Vilnius	Sportima Arena	Artificial	3,157	23	2nd

=== Managers ===
Team	Coach	Appointed	Licence
FK Banga	(Portugal) David Afonso	60 months ago	UEFA Pro
DFK Dainava	(Belarus) Syarhey Kuznyatsow	49 months ago	UEFA A
FC Džiugas	(Lithuania) Andrius Lipskis	29 months ago	UEFA A
FC Hegelmann	(Lithuania) Andrius Skerla	65 months ago	UEFA Pro
FK Kauno Žalgiris	(Lithuania) Saulius Širmelis	24 months ago	UEFA Pro
FK Panevėžys	(Belgium) Stijn Vreven	24 months ago	UEFA Pro
FA Šiauliai	(Lithuania) Mindaugas Čepas	66 months ago	UEFA Pro
FK Sūduva	(Lithuania) Dovydas Lastauskas	40 months ago	UEFA Pro
FK TransINVEST	(Lithuania) Marius Stankevičius	21 months ago	UEFA Pro
FK Žalgiris	(Kazakhstan) Vladimir Cheburin	65 months ago	UEFA Pro

== League table ==
Pos	Team	Pld	W	D	L	GF	GA	GD	Pts	Qualification or relegation
1	Žalgiris (C)	36	24	7	5	76	31	+45	79	Qualification for the Champions League first qualifying round
2	Hegelmann	36	19	10	7	60	40	+20	67	Qualification for the Conference League first qualifying round
3	Kauno Žalgiris	36	15	9	12	43	40	+3	54	Qualification for the Conference League first qualifying round
4	Dainava	36	12	9	15	33	40	−7	45	
5	Banga	36	10	13	13	37	46	−9	43	Qualification for the Conference League second qualifying round (Note: Banga qualified for the Conference League second qualifying round by winning the 2024 Lithuanian Football Cup.)
6	Džiugas	36	11	9	16	33	48	−15	42 (Note: Head-to-head points: Džiugas 8, Šiauliai 2.)	
7	Šiauliai	36	10	12	14	39	50	−11	42	
8	Panevėžys	36	9	14	13	34	40	−6	41	
9	Sūduva (O)	36	9	12	15	33	38	−5	39	Qualification for the A Lyga play-off
10	TransINVEST (R)	36	11	5	20	35	50	−15	38	Relegation to the I Lyga

Source: A Lyga, Soccerway
Rules for classification: 1) Points; 2) Play-off (for champion only) 3) Head-to-head points; 4) Head-to-head goal difference; 5) Head-to-head goals scored; 6) Head-to-head matches won; 7) Goal difference; 8) Goals scored; 9) Matches won; 10) Fairplay ranking; 11) Draw.
(C) Champions; (O) Play-off winners; (R) Relegated

== Fixtures and results ==
Home \ Away	BAN	DAI	DZI	HEG	KAU	PAN	SIA	SUD	TRA	ZAL	BAN	DAI	DZI	HEG	KAU	PAN	SIA	SUD	TRA	ZAL
Banga		0–3	0–2	2–4	1–1	2–0	0–1	0–0	2–0	1–4		0–3	0–0	1–1	1–1	2–3	4–1	1–0	1–1	0–2
Dainava	2–2		0–0	0–2	0–0	0–0	2–2	0–1	1–0	0–1	3–1		3–1	0–1	0–1	1–1	3–2	0–3	0–1	0–5
Džiugas	1–1	2–1		0–0	0–1	0–0	2–1	1–0	2–0	0–4	0–2	0–2		0–2	2–3	3–3	2–2	1–0	0–3	1–0
Hegelmann	2–2	0–1	2–1		0–1	4–2	2–2	3–2	2–3	0–0	3–0	1–2	1–0		1–1	2–2	0–0	2–1	4–1	3–1
Kauno Žalgiris	0–3	1–0	3–0	1–2		0–1	2–1	2–1	2–1	0–1	1–1	0–1	0–1	4–1		0–0	2–1	2–4	2–0	1–0
Panevėžys	0–1	0–0	0–0	0–2	0–0		2–0	1–0	1–1	1–2	0–1	2–0	1–0	0–1	1–2		1–3	0–0	2–1	0–0
Šiauliai	0–0	1–0	3–3	1–1	2–1	1–1		0–1	0–1	1–2	0–0	0–0	0–3	3–1	1–0	2–1		2–1	1–0	1–3
Sūduva	1–0	0–1	0–1	0–1	2–2	1–0	0–0		0–1	1–1	2–0	0–0	2–1	0–1	1–1	1–3	0–0		0–0	1–1
TransINVEST	0–1	0–2	0–1	1–2	3–2	3–0	1–3	0–2		1–3	0–1	2–1	3–0	3–2	0–3	0–0	2–0	2–2		0–1
Žalgiris	2–2	4–0	3–1	1–3	1–0	2–1	3–0	3–3	2–0		2–1	3–1	2–1	1–1	5–0	2–4	3–1	4–0	2–0	

Source: A Lyga, Soccerway
Legend: Blue = home team win; Yellow = draw; Red = away team win.

== A Lyga play-off ==
The ninth-placed club (Sūduva) faced the second-placed club from the 2024 LFF I Lyga (Be1 NFA) in a two-legged play-off for the final place in the 2025 A Lyga.

=== First leg ===
17 November 2024	Be1 NFA	2–1	Sūduva	Kaunas
12:30 BST	Issah 13'; Doké 79'		Burba 78'	Stadium: NFA Stadium

=== Second leg ===
23 November 2024	Sūduva	1–0 (a.e.t.) (2–2 agg.) (4–2 p)	Be1 NFA	Marijampolė
13:00 BST	Lawson 90+4' (pen.)			Stadium: Sūduva Stadium
	Penalties
	Lawson (penalty scored); Burba (penalty scored); Zingertas (penalty scored); Maksimović (penalty scored)		Slendzoka (penalty missed); Dziugas (penalty scored); Paukstys (penalty scored); Sanokho (penalty missed)

== Statistics ==
=== Top Scorers ===
Player	Club	Goals
(Romania) Liviu Antal	FK Žalgiris	20
(Latvia) Davis Ikaunieks	FA Šiauliai	18
(Brazil) Henrique Devens	FK Transinvest	16
(Lithuania) Giedrius Matulevičius	FK Žalgiris	11
(Netherlands) Nino Noordanus	FC Džiugas	11

== Attendances ==
#	Club	Average
1	Žalgiris	929
2	Džiugas	762
3	Dainava	724
4	Banga	693
5	Šiauliai	580
6	Sūduva	501
7	Kauno Žalgiris	465
8	Panevėžys	414
9	Hegelmann	302
10	TransINVEST	297

== See also ==
- Football in Lithuania
