= Arvydas Novikovas =

Lithuanian footballer (born 1990)

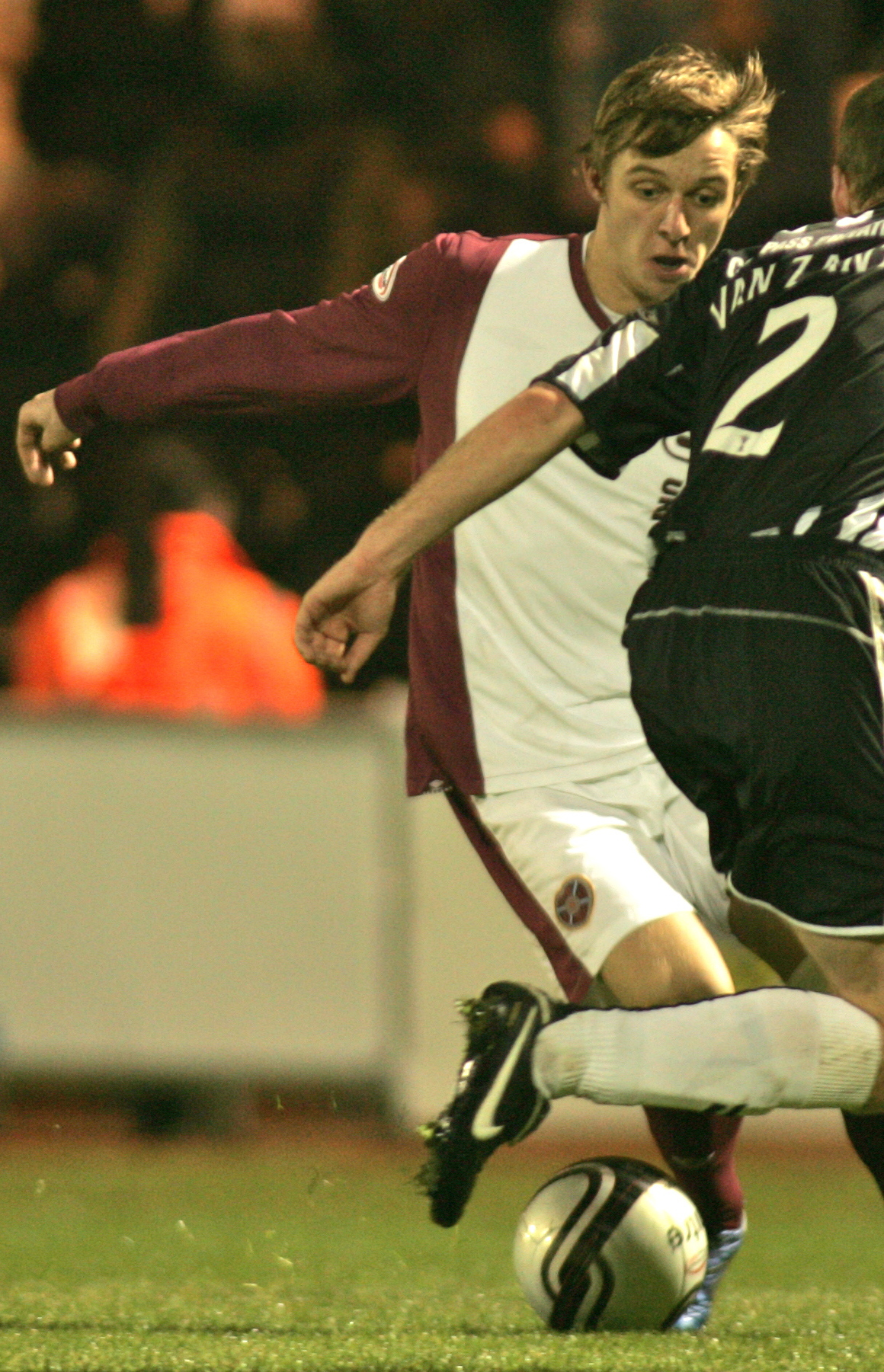
- Novikovas playing for Heart of Midlothian

Personal information
- Date of birth: 18 December 1990 (age 35)
- Place of birth: Vilnius, Lithuania
- Height: 1.79 m (5 ft 10 in)
- Position: Winger

Team information
- Current team: FA Šiauliai
- Number: 11

Senior career*
Years	Team	Apps	(Gls)
2006	FC Vilnius-2		(4)
2007	→ Interas (loan)	12	(0)
2008	FC Vilnius	18	(0)
2008–2013	Heart of Midlothian	65	(6)
2011	→ St Johnstone (loan)	6	(0)
2013–2015	Erzgebirge Aue	41	(5)
2015–2017	Bochum	20	(0)
2017–2019	Jagiellonia Białystok	80	(21)
2017	Jagiellonia Białystok II	1	(0)
2019–2020	Legia Warsaw	17	(4)
2019	Legia Warsaw II	1	(0)
2020–2022	Erzurumspor	60	(12)
2022–2023	Samsunspor	7	(0)
2023	Hapoel Haifa	6	(0)
2023–2024	Žalgiris	9	(3)
2024	Tuzlaspor	9	(0)
2024	FK TransINVEST	3	(0)
2025	Baltijos Futbolo Akademija	13	(4)
2025–	Riteriai	11	(1)
2026–	FA Šiauliai	5	(0)

International career^{‡}
2006–2012	Lithuania U21	19	(3)
2010–	Lithuania	96	(12)
Medal record
Men's football
Representing Lithuania
Baltic Cup
Silver medal – second place	2014
- * Club domestic league appearances and goals as of 27 July 2026 (UTC) ‡ National team caps and goals as of 12 June 2024

Arvydas Novikovas (born 18 December 1990) is a Lithuanian professional footballer who plays as a winger for TOPLYGA club FA Šiauliai.

== Club career ==
=== Lithuania ===
Novikovas started his professional football career in Lithuania, his hometown of Vilnius. He first played for the youth side of FK Vilnius and on loan to sister-club Interas-AE Visaginas. At the time in Lithuania, he impressed while on trial with Benfica, but did not sign for them.

=== Heart of Midlothian ===
In September 2008, Novikovas signed for Heart of Midlothian. He made his first team debut for Hearts in the last game of the 2008–09 Scottish Premier League season, a goalless draw against Celtic, coming on as a substitute in the 51st minute for David Templeton.

In the 2009–10 season, Novikovas earned a first team place, though spending most of the time on the bench, in most matches. Towards the end of the season, Novikovas signed a contract with the club, a three-year deal which would keep him in Edinburgh until 2013.

Still very young, Novikovas suffered a serious injury and upon his return, he was sent to play some games for Hearts reserve and feeder team Tynecastle FC. There he was injured again after a horror tackle by Alasdair Kilgour, which delayed his return to the Hearts first team. In the 2010–11 season, his playing time in the first team was still slender. Despite the first team lack of opportunities, he scored his first league goal for Hearts in the 5–0 win over Aberdeen at Tynecastle on 11 December 2010. Throughout the remainder of the 2010–11 season, he went on loan to Scottish Premier League's rivals St Johnstone.

In the 2011–12 season, on 13 August 2011, he struck his second goal for Hearts, again against Aberdeen, after starting the game up front alongside John Sutton, who scored the other two goals in a 3–0 victory for Hearts. A week after scoring his second goal, he made his European debut, playing the entire game in the second leg of the UEFA Europa League Qualification Round, a goalless draw against Tottenham Hotspur, which eliminated Hearts after a 5–0 loss in the first leg. He's been in and out of the first team ever since joining the club. In a 2–2 draw with Dundee United, Novikovas came off the bench to score an equaliser, his third goal for the club. After the match, Novikovas said his equaliser against Dundee United was the best he had ever scored.

In the 2012–13 season, Novikovas first team opportunities started to increase, following the departure of a bunch of players. He scored his fourth goal for the club in a 2–2 draw against Inverness Caledonian Thistle on 18 August 2012 and played both legs in the Europa League Qualification Round against Liverpool, which proved to be too strong for the Scottish side. Still the Edinburgh-based team pulled out a 1–1 draw in the second leg. In March 2013, Novikovas was then included in the substitute bench for the final of the Scottish League Cup against St Mirren and would come on for Jamie Walker on the 64th minute, as Hearts lost 3–2.

The official Hearts website announced that he had left the club to pursue his career elsewhere on 31 May 2013. After his departure, Edinburgh Evening News reported that if Novikovas joined a new club, the club would receive £100,000 compensation.

==== St Johnstone (loan) ====
On the last day of the January 2011 transfer window, Novikovas went on loan to St Johnstone until the end of the 2010–11 season. He made his debut for St Johnstone in their 2–0 victory over Hamilton on 1 February. In all he made six appearances for the Perth side.

=== Erzgebirge Aue ===
On 22 June 2013, it was announced that Novikovas signed a three-year deal with Erzgebirge Aue. It was thought that Novikovas was signed as Jan Hochscheidt replacement who has moved to Eintracht Braunschweig. During first league match for his new team Novikovas received two yellow cards and was sent off. In fourth league match for Aue he scored double, helping team to reach 2–1 victory over FC Energie Cottbus.

=== VfL Bochum ===
On 24 July 2015, VfL Bochum announced that they signed Novikovas for free from FC Erzgebirge Aue on a two-year deal Novikovas played 20 games for VfL Bochum, providing only one assist on his stay there. On 12 January 2017, Vfl Bochum confirmed that Novikovas has left for Jagiellonia Białystok on a free.

=== Jagiellonia Białystok ===
Novikovas joined Jagiellonia Białystok on a free, signing a contract until 31 December 2019. Novikovas was given the number 9 and was immediately a starter. During his two season there he has helped Jagiellonia Białystok finish second twice in a row. He scored 16 goals and provided 12 assists in the 58 games he has played for them, starting the 2018–19 season with three goals and two assists in his first nine games.

== International career ==
Novikovas represented the Lithuania under-21's when he was just a 16-year-old.

In May 2009, he was called up to the Lithuania squad, for their FIFA World Cup qualifier with Romania. On 9 September, Novikovas scored for Lithuania under-21s 1–1 against Macedonia under-21 in the 2011 UEFA European Under-21 Football Championship qualification Group 9 match.

On 25 May 2010, he gained his first cap against Ukraine in Kharkiv.

== Career statistics ==
=== Club ===
As of match played 19 October 2024

Appearances and goals by club, season and competition
Club	Season	League			National cup (Note: Includes Scottish FA Cup, DFB-Pokal, Polish Cup, Turkish Cup)		League cup (Note: Includes Scottish League Cup)		Continental		Total	
Club	Season	Division	Apps	Goals	Apps	Goals	Apps	Goals	Apps	Goals	Apps	Goals
FC Vilnius-2	2006	I Lyga		4			—		—			
FC Vilnius-2	2008	I Lyga	18	0			—		—			
FC Vilnius-2	Total			4			0	0	0	0		
Interas-AE Visaginas (loan)	2007	A Lyga	12	0			—		—			
Heart of Midlothian	2008–09	Scottish Premier League	1	0	0	0	0	0	—		1	0
Heart of Midlothian	2009–10	Scottish Premier League	13	0	0	0	0	0	1 (Note: Appearance(s) in UEFA Europa League)	0	14	0
Heart of Midlothian	2010–11	Scottish Premier League	6	1	1	0	1	1	—		8	2
Heart of Midlothian	2011–12	Scottish Premier League	14	2	0	0	2	0	2	0	18	2
Heart of Midlothian	2012–13	Scottish Premier League	26	2	1	0	4	0	2	0	33	2
Heart of Midlothian	Total		60	5	2	0	7	1	5	0	74	6
St Johnstone (loan)	2010–11	Scottish Premier League	6	0	0	0	0	0	—		6	0
Erzgebirge Aue	2013–14	2. Bundesliga	20	3	1	0	—		—		21	3
Erzgebirge Aue	2014–15	2. Bundesliga	21	2	2	0	—		—		23	2
Erzgebirge Aue	Total		41	5	3	0	0	0	0	0	44	5
VfL Bochum	2015–16	2. Bundesliga	15	0	0	0	—		—		15	0
VfL Bochum	2016–17	2. Bundesliga	5	0	0	0	—		—		5	0
VfL Bochum	Total		20	0	0	0	0	0	0	0	20	0
Jagiellonia Białystok	2016–17	Ekstraklasa	15	3	0	0	—		—		15	3
Jagiellonia Białystok	2017–18	Ekstraklasa	34	9	1	1	—		4	0	39	10
Jagiellonia Białystok	2018–19	Ekstraklasa	31	9	5	0	—		4	0	40	9
Jagiellonia Białystok	Total		80	21	6	1	0	0	8	0	94	22
Jagiellonia Białystok II	2016–17	III liga	1	0	—		—		—		1	0
Legia Warsaw	2019–20	Ekstraklasa	17	4	2	0	—		5	0	24	4
Legia Warsaw II	2019–20	III liga	1	0	—		—		—		1	0
Erzurumspor	2020–21	Süper Lig	31	4	1	0	—		—		32	4
Erzurumspor	2021–22	TFF 1. Lig	31	9	0	0	—		—		31	9
Erzurumspor	Total		62	13	1	0	—		—		63	13
Samsunspor	2022–23	TFF 1. Lig	7	0	1	0	—		—		8	0
Hapoel Haifa	2022–23	Israeli Premier League	6	0	0	0	—		—		6	0
Žalgiris	2023	A Lyga	9	3	0	0	—		4 (Note: Two appearances in UEFA Europa League, two appearances in UEFA Europa Conference League)	0	13	3
Tuzlaspor	2023–24	TFF 1. Lig	9	0	—		—		—		9	0
FK TransINVEST	2024	A Lyga	3	0	—		—		—		3	0
Career total			352	55	21	1	7	1	22	0	402	56

=== International ===
As of 11 June 2024

Appearances and goals by national team and year
National team	Year	Apps	Goals
Lithuania	2010	2	0
Lithuania	2011	4	0
Lithuania	2012	4	0
Lithuania	2013	4	0
Lithuania	2014	9	2
Lithuania	2015	4	1
Lithuania	2016	7	1
Lithuania	2017	7	1
Lithuania	2018	10	0
Lithuania	2019	7	3
Lithuania	2020	6	4
Lithuania	2021	13	0
Lithuania	2022	8	0
Lithuania	2023	13	0
Lithuania	2024	3	0
Total		96	12

As of match played 18 November 2020

Scores and results list Lithuania's goal tally first, score column indicates score after each Novikovas goal.

List of international goals scored by Arvydas Novikovas
No.	Date	Venue	Cap	Opponent	Score	Result	Competition
1	29 May 2014	Olimpiskais Stadions, Ventspils, Latvia	16	Finland	1–0	1–0	2014 Baltic Cup
2	8 September 2014	San Marino Stadium, Serravalle, San Marino	19	San Marino	2–0	2–0	UEFA Euro 2016 qualification
3	9 October 2015	Stožice Stadium, Ljubljana, Slovenia	26	Slovenia	1–1	1–1	UEFA Euro 2016 qualification
4	11 October 2016	LFF Stadium, Vilnius, Lithuania	33	Malta	2–0	2–0	2018 FIFA World Cup qualification
5	10 June 2017	LFF Stadium, Vilnius, Lithuania	37	Slovakia	1–2	1–2	2018 FIFA World Cup qualification
6	7 June 2019	LFF Stadium, Vilnius, Lithuania	53	Luxembourg	1–1	1–1	UEFA Euro 2020 qualification
7	10 June 2019	Red Star Stadium, Belgrade, Serbia	54	Serbia	1–3	1–4	UEFA Euro 2020 qualification
8	17 November 2019	LFF Stadium, Vilnius, Lithuania	58	New Zealand	1–0	1–0	Friendly
9	7 October 2020	A. Le Coq Arena, Tallinn, Estonia	59	Estonia	1–0	3–1	Friendly
10	7 October 2020	A. Le Coq Arena, Tallinn, Estonia	59	Estonia	3–0	3–1	Friendly
11	11 October 2020	LFF Stadium, Vilnius, Lithuania	60	Belarus	1–0	2–2	2020–21 UEFA Nations League C
12	18 November 2020	Almaty Central Stadium, Almaty, Kazakhstan	64	Kazakhstan	2–1	2–1	2020–21 UEFA Nations League C

== Honours ==
Legia Warsaw

- Ekstraklasa: 2019–20

Individual

- Piłka Nożna Foreigner of the Year: 2018
