= 2020 LFF I Lyga =

I Lyga
- Season: 2020

The 2020 LFF I Lyga is the 31st season of the I Lyga, the second tier football league of Lithuania. The season was planned to begin in March, but was delayed to June because of COVID-19 pandemic. The season finished on time on 31 October.

== Teams ==
=== Team changes ===
The last-placed A Lyga team is normally relegated to I Lyga. Since FC Stumbras had gone out of business in July 2019, no team was relegated from A Lyga in 2019. The 7th placed team in A Lyga contests a play-off match with 2nd placed I Lyga team. In this play-off match FK Banga Gargždai beat A Lyga side FC Palanga to claim a spot in the A Lyga.

Arrived to I Lyga
▼ Relegated from A Lyga	▲ Promoted from II Lyga
FC Stumbras (ceased to exist)	Kauno Žalgiris B
FC Palanga	Panevėžys B

Departed from I Lyga
▲ Promoted to A Lyga	▼ Relegated to II Lyga
FK Banga Gargždai	FC Pakruojis

▼ Demoted to II lyga
FC Palanga
FK Atlantas (from A lyga to II lyga)
FC Kupiškis

=== Licensing Process ===
Ultimately, the licensing process determines clubs eligibility to contest in the respective league in Lithuanian football.

At the end of 2019 A Lyga season, a match fixing investigation was launched after irregular betting patterns were reported. In December 2019 the results of the investigation were published, resulting expulsion of FK Atlantas and FC Palanga from A Lyga, and their demotion to II Lyga. The clubs appealed, but their appeals were rejected. The clubs attempted to license to I Lyga, but the decision to demote the clubs to II Lyga stood ground.

With reduction of numbers in A Lyga, several I Lyga clubs attempted to leapfrog into promotion to A Lyga. DFK Dainava, Vilniaus Vytis and FC Hegelmann Litauen have applied for A Lyga license. FC Hegelmann Litauen later withdrew their application, while DFK Dainava and Vilniaus Vytis had their applications rejected. FC Džiugas, last season's I Lyga winners application was also rejected failing to meet several criteria. FK Banga Gargždai was the only I Lyga club that successfully licensed to A Lyga. Three of the four other applicants, FC Džiugas, DFK Dainava and FC Hegelmann Litauen I Lyga licenses were automatically approved. Vilniaus Vytis failed to meet I Lyga licensing criteria, and license was not issued even after the appeal. However, the club was granted an exception with a condition that the club reaches certain milestones by 9 March. Vytis will start the season with 3 point penalty.

In February 2020 further match fixing investigation results were published. As a result, FC Kupiškis was fined and expelled from I Lyga.

Other I Lyga teams FK Nevėžis, FA Šiauliai, Baltijos Futbolo Akademija (which split up from partnership with FK Vilnius (2019)), FK Minija (2017), FK Jonava, Riteriai B renewed their licenses successfully, although FK Nevėžis needed to go through the appeal process. Successful licensing to I Lyga was awarded to FK Atmosfera (2012) and Žalgiris B as well, despite their results suggesting relegation to II Lyga.

Three II Lyga teams licensed successfully to I Lyga - II Lyga Southern Group winners Kauno Žalgiris B, as well as 4th placed Panevėžys B and 13th placed Sūduva B. Other II Lyga teams that sought I Lyga licenses were FK Aukštaitija and the II Lyga Western Group winners FSK Radviliškis. The licensing criteria were not met and the promotion was not granted. FK Aukštaitija asked to grant an exception to participate without a license, but this request was rejected as well.

III Lyga (Klaipėda`s zone) side FC Sakuona Plikiai have also attempted to license, but later withdrew their application.

Only FC Pakruojis have dropped out of the I Lyga, along with Stumbras B which had gone out of business.

=== Participants ===
Home towns of the 2020 I Lyga teams

Team	Town	Stadium	Capacity
FK Atmosfera	Mažeikiai	Mažeikių miesto stadionas	2,500
Baltijos Futbolo Akademija	Vilnius	Širvintų stadionas	500
DFK Dainava	Alytus	Alytaus miesto stadionas	4,000
FC Džiugas	Telšiai	Telšių miesto centrinis stadionas	3,000
FC Hegelmann Litauen	Kaunas	NFA stadionas	1,000
FK Jonava	Jonava	Jonavos miesto stadionas	1,400
Kauno Žalgiris B	Kaunas	Kauno Žalgirio FA stadionas	500
FK Minija	Kretinga	Kretingos miesto stadionas	1,000
FK Nevėžis	Kėdainiai	Kėdainių miesto centrinis stadionas	3,000
Panevėžys B	Panevėžys	Žemynos progimnazijos stadionas	500
Riteriai B	Vilnius	LFF Stadium	5,400
FA Šiauliai	Šiauliai	Šiaulių stadionas	9,125
Žalgiris B	Vilnius	LFF Stadium	5,400
Vilniaus Vytis	Vilnius	LFF Stadium	5,400

== Season progress ==
The Lithuanian Football Federation announced that top four teams will qualify for promotion to A Lyga next season. The reserve teams are not eligible for promotion.

Originally, the first round was scheduled for 21 March, and the final round to be played in October. Due to the COVID-19 virus pandemic the start of the championship was postponed. The first round took place on 5 June, and the last round took place on 31 October.

On 10 April the decision was taken to make changes to the format of the championship this year. The competition will take place in a form of one-and-a-half round system. In the first round all teams would play with each other. In the second round the teams would split into two groups. In the top group, the teams positioned 1-8 would play with each other, competing for promotion. The teams in the bottom group, positioned in positions 9-14 would continue the relegation fight. By shortening the calendar and by giving up a longer summer break the season will end by November as planned. As originally planned, the first four teams will win the right to advance to the A league in the following season. In case of refusal or ineligibility of some teams (such as reserve teams), only the teams in the top 8 positions will be allowed to seek promotion to the A league. The two bottom teams are liable for relegation.

== League table ==
Pos	Team	Pld	W	D	L	GF	GA	GD	Pts	Qualification
1	Jonava	13	9	4	0	28	11	+17	31	Qualification for Promotion Round
2	Nevėžis	13	10	1	2	34	9	+25	31	Qualification for Promotion Round
3	Džiugas Telšiai	13	9	3	1	28	11	+17	30	Qualification for Promotion Round
4	Hegelmann Litauen	13	8	4	1	24	6	+18	28	Qualification for Promotion Round
5	Vilniaus Vytis	13	8	3	2	26	17	+9	27	Qualification for Promotion Round
6	Dainava	13	7	1	5	20	12	+8	22	Qualification for Promotion Round
7	FA Šiauliai	13	7	1	5	30	18	+12	22	Qualification for Promotion Round
8	Panevėžys B	13	5	2	6	25	25	0	17	Qualification for Promotion Round
9	Žalgiris B	13	5	2	6	24	25	−1	17	Qualification for Relegation Round
10	Minija	13	3	2	8	19	30	−11	11	Qualification for Relegation Round
11	Atmosfera	13	3	1	9	10	26	−16	10	Qualification for Relegation Round
12	Kauno Žalgiris B	13	2	0	11	13	36	−23	6	Qualification for Relegation Round
13	Baltijos Futbolo Akademija	13	2	0	11	11	40	−29	6	Qualification for Relegation Round
14	Riteriai B	13	0	2	11	9	35	−26	2	Qualification for Relegation Round

Updated to match(es) played on 7 August 2020. Source: Soccerway
Rules for classification: 1) Points; 2) Play-off (only for deciding promotion); 3) Head-to-head points; 4) Head-to-head goal difference; 5) Head-to-head goals scored; 6) Matches won; 7) Goal difference; 8) Goals scored;

== Promotion round and Regulation round League table ==
Pos	Team	Pld	W	D	L	GF	GA	GD	Pts	Qualification
1	Nevėžis (P)	20	15	3	2	46	12	+34	48	Promotion to the 2021 LFF A Lyga
2	Hegelmann Litauen (P)	20	14	4	2	39	12	+27	46	Promotion to the 2021 LFF A Lyga
3	Jonava (P)	20	12	5	3	38	19	+19	41	Promotion to the 2021 LFF A Lyga
4	Džiugas Telšiai (P)	20	11	5	4	34	19	+15	38	Promotion to the 2021 LFF A Lyga
5	FA Šiauliai	20	10	2	8	42	27	+15	32	
6	Dainava	20	10	2	8	28	19	+9	32	
7	Vilniaus Vytis	20	9	3	8	35	38	−3	30	
8	Panevėžys B	20	6	3	11	34	44	−10	21	
9	Žalgiris B	18	7	3	8	33	32	+1	24	
10	Minija	18	6	3	9	33	38	−5	21	
11	Kauno Žalgiris B	18	5	1	12	21	41	−20	16	
12	Atmosfera	18	4	3	11	20	38	−18	15	
13	Baltijos Futbolo Akademija	18	4	2	12	20	48	−28	14	
14	Riteriai B	18	0	3	15	14	50	−36	3	

Updated to match(es) played on 10 November 2020. Source: Soccerway
Rules for classification: 1) Points; 2) Play-off (only for deciding promotion); 3) Head-to-head points; 4) Head-to-head goal difference; 5) Head-to-head goals scored; 6) Matches won; 7) Goal difference; 7) Goals scored;
(P) Promoted

=== Top Scorers ===
Data at the end of the season 31 October 2020

#	Player	Team	Goals
1.	Evaldas Kugys	FK Nevėžis Kėdainiai	16
2.	Rokas Gedminas	FA Šiauliai	14
2.	Meinardas Mikulėnas	Žalgiris B	14
4.	Aretas Gėgžna	FK Nevėžis Kėdainiai	11
5.	Joao Pedro Ferreira da Silva	FK Minija	10
6.	Eimantas Abramavičius	Panevėžys B	9
6.	Vilius Armanavičius	FC Hegelmann Litauen	9
6.	Ernestas Stočkūnas	DFK Dainava	9
9.	Dovydas Arlauskis	FC Džiugas Telšiai	8
9.	Ibrahima Sory Soumah	Vilniaus Vytis	8

== See also ==
- 2020 A Lyga
- 2020 II Lyga
- 2020 Lithuanian Football Cup
- Football in Lithuania
