= FK Be1 =

- Full name: Be1 Nacionalinė Futbolo Akademija
- Nickname: Talentai
- Founded: 2006; 20 years ago, as NFA
- Ground: Jonava Stadium
- Capacity: 2,580
- Manager: Mikołaj Raczyński
- League: I Lyga
- 2026: I Lyga, 3rd of 16
- Website: https://be1.lt/futbolo-akademija/
Home colours	Away colours

FK Be1 is a Lithuanian professional football club based in Jonava. Before 2019, it was named FK NFA, later – Be1 NFA and FK Be1.

== History ==
The National Football Academy of Lithuania (NFA, in Lithuanian Nacionalinė Futbolo Akademija) was established in 2006. In 2012, the academy founded a professional team under the name FK NFA. In the 2012 season, it played in the I Lyga, the second tier of the Lithuanian football system, and finished in 6th place. After the season, the NFA decided to voluntarily drop the club to the 3rd tier.

In 2013, the club competed in II Lyga. After the first half of the season, the club was in 3rd position. FK NFA withdrew mid-season and their license was taken over by FC Stumbras, who went on to reach the first place. In 2017, FK NFA was re-established in II Lyga, won the top spot and gained promotion to I Lyga. In the 2018 I Lyga season, the club reached the 10th position.

=== Be1 NFA ===
In 2019, the management of the academy was taken over from LFF (Lithuanian Football Federation) by the Kauno Futbolo Akademija (Be1SC) and the club was renamed to Be1 NFA. In 2021, a team was formed and played in II Lyga. On 15 June 2021, the club lost 0–6 against FC Džiugas Telšiai in the second round of the 2021 Lithuanian Football Cup and was knocked out of the competition. At the end of the 2021 season, the club finished in second place and were promoted to I Lyga.

At the end of the 2023 I Lyga season, Be1 NFA reached second place and qualified for the A Lyga play-off against FC Džiugas Telšiai. After a 1–1 draw in the first leg, NFA lost the second leg 0–1 and thus missed the promotion.

=== FK Be1 ===
The possibility of moving to Jonava was considered in 2022, after season of First League. Final decision was made in February 2024. BE1 NFA continued to operate in Kaunas, while FK BE1 players became part of a registered institution in Jonava. On 5 February it was announced that the club got the A Lyga licence.

== Recent seasons ==
Lithuanian championship as FK NFA
Season	Level	League	Place	Reference
2012	2.	Pirma lyga	6th	
2017	3.	Antra lyga	1st	
2018	2.	Pirma lyga	10th	

Lithuanian championship as Be1 NFA
Season	Level	League	Place	LFF Cup	Reference
2021	3.	Antra lyga	2th	Second round	
2022	2.	Pirma lyga	4th	Round of 32	
2023	2.	Pirma lyga	2nd	Round of 32	

Lithuanian championship as FK Be1
Season	Level	League	Place	LFF Cup	Reference
2024	2.	Pirma lyga	2.	Round of 32	
2025	2.	Pirma lyga	11.	Round of 32	

== Stadiums ==
The NFA Stadionas was the home ground of Be1 NFA in Kaunas. Since February 2024, due to the club relocating to Jonava, the home matches are played at the Jonava Stadium.

== Kit ==
2012 (Home)	2012 (Away)	2018 (Home)	2018 (Away)

The current Be1 NFA kit consists of white shirts, dark blue shorts, and white socks. Away kits consist of dark blue shirts, dark blue shorts, and dark blue socks.

2021 (Home)	2021 (Away)

=== Kit manufacturers ===
- Hummel (2017–2018)
- Nike (2021–)

== Squad (2026) ==
Note: Flags indicate national team as defined under FIFA eligibility rules; some limited exceptions apply. Players may hold more than one non-FIFA nationality.

No.	Pos.	Nation	Player
1	GK	SUR	Ishan Kort
29	GK	UKR	Andriy Popov
2	DF	LTU	Ignas Virbalas
4	DF	LTU	Paulius Stankus
16	DF	NGR	Patrick Nwodo
17	DF	LTU	Matas Dedura
24	DF	LTU	Tomas Gumbelevičius
27	DF	UKR	Sergiy Chyzhyk
6	MF	NED	Safouane Karim
7	MF	LTU	Justas Rakauskas
11	MF	LTU	Gerdas Barkauskas

No.	Pos.	Nation	Player
12	MF	RSA	Kuhle Bekwayo
18	MF	TOG	Komlan Akakpo
19	MF	LTU	Arnas Jucius
22	MF	BRA	Vitor Tardelli
23	MF	LTU	Tomas Gudaitis
53	MF	GHA	Emmanuel Lawal
71	MF	LTU	Ignas Bajorinas
8	FW	BRA	Nicolas Rangel
9	FW	LTU	Tomas Gutauskas
13	FW	NGR	William Akpan
10	FW	BRA	Michael Thuíque
30	FW	GHA	Joshua Ampofo
