= FK TransINVEST =

TransINVEST
- Full name: Futbolo Klubas Transinvest
- Founded: December 2021; 4 years ago
- Ground: FK Transinvest stadionas, Galinė
- Capacity: 1,500
- Chairman: Algimantas Karavajevas
- Coach: Marius Stankevičius
- League: TOPLYGA
- 2026: TOPLYGA, 4th of 10
Home colours	Away colours

Futbolo Klubas Transinvest is a Lithuanian professional football club based in Galinė, Vilnius County. The club competes in the TOPLYGA, the top flight of Lithuanian football.

== History ==
FK Transinvest was founded in 2021. In 2021 December, applications for a license to II Lyga were also submitted by a previously unknown club, which was named "Transekspedicijos" football club.

It became known that the cargo transportation company Transekspedicija became the founders and sponsors of the football club.

In 2022, in the presentation of the teams of II Lyga, it was already written that the team was assembled on the basis of VGTU Vilkai.

In September 2023, it was announced that the owners of the club plan to build a 1,500-seat stadium in the village of Galinė.

In 2022, the club were licensed to participate in the II Lyga.

The club made their debut in the II Lyga in 2022. On April 3, when they played a home match against the Sūvuva B team at Širvintos Stadium. After a changing battle, the players of Transinvest won 5–3.

On 20 May 2022, the club achieved victory in the II Lyga match with a record score of 16–0. Dziugas B football players were crushed in the match held at Širvintos city stadium.

The team showed good results from the first game and became the winners of the Anras league. The team scored 109 goals during the season (an average of 4.19 per game). The club was granted 2023 I Lyga license. In early 2023, the club recruited Deividas Malžinskas and Linas Pilibaitis to their ranks. On 9 September 2023, Transinvest defeated Džiugas Telšiai 1–0 in the semifinals of the LFF Cup tournament and reached the final. Valentinas Jeriomenka scored the winning goal in the last minutes of the match. In the final, at the Darius and Girėnas Stadium in Kaunas, they won 2–1 against FA Šiauliai and became the first non-A League club in the history of Lithuanian football to win the LFF Cup. The club also prematurely secured the I Lyga' title.

The club was granted 2024 A Lyga license. FK Transinvest made their A-League debut with a 3–2 win over FC Hegelmann. The match was nicknamed the "furist derby" because the owners of both clubs are transport companies. FK Transinvest, who won the 2023 Lithuanian Football Cup, won the right to play in the UEFA Conference League. However, UEFA rules indicate that only clubs founded more than 3 years ago can participate in European tournaments - FK Transinvest did not meet this criterion. Nevertheless, an exception was given to Transinvest, entering them into the second qualifying round of the Conference League.

In 2025, Transinvest secured promotion back to the top-tier by winning the I Lyga after a year-long absence.

== Honours ==
- Lithuanian Football Cup
  - Winners (1): 2023
- I Lyga
  - Winners (2): 2023, 2025
- II Lyga
  - Winners (1): 2022

== Current squad ==
As of 28 July, 2026

Note: Flags indicate national team as defined under FIFA eligibility rules; some limited exceptions apply. Players may hold more than one non-FIFA nationality.

No.	Pos.	Nation	Player
1	GK	LTU	Julius Virvilas
5	DF	LTU	Ričardas Šveikauskas
6	MF	ESP	Iker Bilbao
7	MF	AUT	Denis Bošnjak
8	MF	UKR	Yehor Hlushach
9	FW	MNE	Stefan Milošević
10	FW	NGR	Chidera Nwoga
11	MF	USA	Nana Akosah-Bempah
12	MF	LTU	Nojus Petkus
13	MF	JPN	Hideyasu Tanaka
15	DF	GHA	Emmanuel Koffi
19	DF	ENG	Oscar Boateng

No.	Pos.	Nation	Player
23	MF	ESP	Xabi Auzmendi
26	MF	LTU	Andrius Kazakevičius
32	MF	UKR	Mykola Musolitin
33	DF	LTU	Dominykas Barauskas
44	DF	LTU	Artūras Žulpa
49	DF	POR	Bruno Tavares
55	GK	LTU	Mantas Bertašius
66	GK	MDA	Igor Mostovei
70	FW	GUI	Amadou Traoré
80	MF	LTU	Edvinas Kloniūnas
88	MF	LTU	Domantas Šluta
93	DF	LTU	Edvinas Girdvainis

== European record ==
Season	Competition	Round	Opponent	Home	Away	Agg.
2024–25	UEFA Conference League	2Q	(Czech Republic) Mladá Boleslav	0–1	0–2	0–3
2027–28	UEFA Conference League	1Q				
