= 2023 A Lyga =

Lyga football

A Lyga
- Season: 2023
- Dates: 3 March – 12 November 2023
- Champions: Panevėžys
- Relegated: Riteriai
- Champions League: Panevėžys
- Conference League: Žalgiris; Šiauliai
- Matches played: 171
- Goals scored: 403 (2.36 per match)

The 2023 A Lyga, for sponsorship reasons also called Optibet A lyga was the 34th season of the A Lyga, the top-tier football league of Lithuania. The season began on 3 March 2023 and concluded on 12 November 2023.

The winners (Panevėžys) qualified for the 2024–25 Champions League first qualifying round. The runners-up (Žalgiris) and third-placed team (Šiauliai) qualified for the 2024–25 Conference League first qualifying round. The ninth-placed team (Džiugas) qualified for the A Lyga play-off, winning to retain their place in the league. The bottom-placed team (Riteriai) were relegated to the 2024 LFF I Lyga.

== Teams ==
The league consisted of ten teams, nine of which remained from the previous season. Žalgiris entered the season as defending champions. Jonava were relegated and replaced by Dainava, returning after one year's absence. Ninth-placed Džiugas remained in A Lyga after winning the playoff against I Lyga's Neptūnas.

Home towns of the 2023 A Lyga teams

2023 A Lyga competitors
Club	Location	Stadium	Surface	Capacity	Seasons in A Lyga	Position in 2022
Banga	Gargždai	Gargždai Stadium	Artificial	2,323	10	8th
DFK Dainava	Alytus	Alytus Stadium	Natural	3,726	12	1st in I lyga
DFK Dainava	Marijampolė	Marijampolė Football Indoor Arena	Artificial	2,660	12	1st in I lyga
Džiugas	Telšiai	Telšiai Central Stadium	Natural	2,320	3	9th
Džiugas	Telšiai	Ateitis Progymnasium Stadium	Artificial	300	3	9th
Hegelmann	Kaunas	LFF Kaunas Training Center Stadium	Artificial	500	3	4th
Kauno Žalgiris	Kaunas	Darius and Girėnas Stadium	Hybrid	15,315	9	2nd
Kauno Žalgiris	Akademija	VDU Stadium	Artificial	1,000	9	2nd
Panevėžys	Panevėžys	Aukštaitija Stadium	Natural	6,600	5	3rd
Panevėžys	Panevėžys	Žemyna Progymnasium Stadium	Artificial	620	5	3rd
Riteriai	Vilnius	LFF Stadium	Artificial	5,067	10	5th
Riteriai	Vilnius	Sportima Arena	Artificial	3,157	10	5th
Sūduva	Marijampolė	Marijampolė Football Arena	Natural	6,250	21	6th
Sūduva	Marijampolė	Marijampolė Football Indoor Arena	Artificial	2,660	21	6th
FA Šiauliai	Šiauliai	Savivaldybė Stadium	Natural	4,000	2	7th
FA Šiauliai	Šiauliai	Gytariai Stadium	Artificial	500	2	7th
Žalgiris	Vilnius	LFF Stadium	Artificial	5,067	22	1st
Žalgiris	Vilnius	Sportima Arena	Artificial	3,157	22	1st

=== Managers ===
==== Current Managers ====
Team	Coach	Appointed	Licence
FK Banga	(Portugal) David Afonso	49 months ago	UEFA Pro
DFK Dainava	(Belarus) Syarhey Kuznyatsow	38 months ago	UEFA A
FC Džiugas	(Portugal) João Prates	49 months ago	UEFA Pro
FC Hegelmann	(Lithuania) Andrius Skerla	54 months ago	UEFA Pro
FK Kauno Žalgiris	(Lithuania) Nerijus Mačiulis (caretaker)	21 months ago	
FK Panevėžys	(Italy) Gino Lettieri	33 months ago	UEFA Pro
FK Riteriai	(Portugal) Matthew Silva	23 months ago	UEFA Pro
FK Sūduva	(Lithuania) Dovydas Lastauskas	29 months ago	
FA Šiauliai	(Lithuania) Mindaugas Čepas	55 months ago	UEFA Pro
FK Žalgiris	(Kazakhstan) Vladimir Cheburin	54 months ago	UEFA Pro

==== Managerial changes ====
Team	Outgoing manager	Manner of departure	Date of vacancy	Incoming manager	Date of appointment
FK Sūduva	(Portugal) Matthew Silva	End of caretaker spell	30 November 2022	(Lithuania) Dovydas Lastauskas	1 February 2023
FK Riteriai	(Spain) Pablo Villar	Sacked	24 March 2023	(Serbia) Vladimir Janković	1 April 2023
FK Kauno Žalgiris	(Lithuania) Rokas Garastas	Sacked	1 May 2023	(Lithuania) Marius Stankevičius	1 May 2023
FK Riteriai	(Serbia) Vladimir Janković	Sacked	22 July 2023	(Portugal) Matthew Silva	26 July 2023
FK Kauno Žalgiris	(Lithuania) Marius Stankevičius	Sacked	5 October 2023	(Lithuania) Nerijus Mačiulis (caretaker)	5 October 2023

== Regular season ==
=== League table ===
Pos	Team	Pld	W	D	L	GF	GA	GD	Pts	Qualification or relegation
1	Panevėžys (C)	36	26	9	1	64	14	+50	87	Qualification for the Champions League first qualifying round
2	Žalgiris	36	23	6	7	67	28	+39	75	Qualification for the Conference League first qualifying round
3	Šiauliai	36	16	14	6	51	35	+16	62	Qualification for the Conference League first qualifying round
4	Kauno Žalgiris	36	15	14	7	61	40	+21	59	
5	Hegelmann	36	18	5	13	62	43	+19	59	
6	Banga	36	10	6	20	22	52	−30	36	
7	Sūduva	36	10	5	21	28	60	−32	35	
8	Dainava	36	7	10	19	25	40	−15	31	
9	Džiugas (O)	36	4	13	19	25	57	−32	25	Qualification for the A Lyga play-off
10	Riteriai (R)	36	5	10	21	26	62	−36	25	Relegation to I Lyga

Source: A Lyga
Rules for classification: 1) Points; 2) Play-off (for champion only) 3) Head-to-head points; 4) Head-to-head goal difference; 5) Head-to-head goals scored; 6) Head-to-head matches won; 7) Goal difference; 8) Goals scored; 9) Matches won; 10) Fairplay ranking; 11) Draw.
(C) Champions; (O) Play-off winners; (R) Relegated

=== Fixtures and results ===
Home \ Away	BAN	DAI	DZI	HEG	KAU	PAN	RIT	SIA	SUD	ZAL	BAN	DAI	DZI	HEG	KAU	PAN	RIT	SIA	SUD	ZAL
Banga		2–1	2–0	0–5	0–2	0–4	1–1	0–1	1–0	0–2		1–0	0–1	0–3	1–1	0–1	1–2	1–1	1–0	1–4
Dainava	2–1		2–2	1–0	0–0	0–1	5–0	0–0	2–1	0–2	0–1		1–0	1–2	1–1	1–2	0–1	1–2	1–2	0–2
Džiugas	1–2	0–1		2–0	0–0	0–3	1–1	1–1	0–2	0–2	0–1	2–1		1–2	0–2	0–3	2–2	3–3	1–1	1–2
Hegelmann	5–0	3–0	2–0		3–2	2–4	0–1	2–3	6–0	0–1	1–0	0–0	1–1		1–1	0–0	1–0	3–1	2–0	2–0
Kauno Žalgiris	0–0	1–0	3–1	4–0		0–1	3–1	0–0	3–0	1–1	3–1	1–1	0–0	4–2		1–1	3–2	3–2	1–1	2–5
Panevėžys	2–0	0–0	4–0	1–0	2–1		3–1	3–1	0–0	0–0	2–0	2–0	0–0	2–2	3–0		1–0	2–0	2–1	2–0
Riteriai	0–0	0–0	1–1	0–4	1–1	0–4		0–1	1–0	0–2	0–1	1–3	0–0	2–3	1–3	0–2		0–1	1–2	2–6
Šiauliai	1–1	2–0	2–0	3–1	1–0	0–0	1–1		3–0	1–0	3–0	0–0	3–0 (Note: Originally a 0–1 win for Džiugas; later overturned to a 3–0 win for Siauliai.)	1–3	1–1	1–1	2–0		3–2	0–0
Sūduva	0–2	2–0	1–0	2–0	2–4	0–2	0–0	0–2		2–1	1–0	2–0	0–0	0–1	2–6	0–1	0–3	2–0		0–2
Žalgiris	1–0	0–0	2–3	1–0	2–1	2–1	1–0	2–2	4–0		1–0	1–0	4–1	4–0	0–2	1–2	3–0	2–2	4–0	

Source: A Lyga
Legend: Blue = home team win; Yellow = draw; Red = away team win.

=== A Lyga play-off ===
The ninth-placed club (Džiugas) faced the second-placed club from the 2023 LFF I Lyga (Be1 NFA) for the final place in the following season's A Lyga.

=== First leg ===
18 November 2023	Be1 NFA	1–1	Džiugas	Kaunas
11:00 BST	Wouter 19'		Jezdimirović 73'	Stadium: NFA Stadium

=== Second leg ===
25 November 2023	Džiugas	1–0 (2–1 agg.)	Be1 NFA	Gargždai
11:00 BST	Nuno Pereira 69' (pen.)			Stadium: Gargždai Central Stadium

== Season statistics ==
=== Top scorers ===
As of match played 12 November 2023

Rank	Player	Club	Goals
1	(Nigeria) Mathias Oyewusi	Žalgiris	19
2	(Croatia) Filip Dangubić	Hegelmann	18
3	(Lithuania) Eligijus Jankauskas	FA Šiauliai	14
3	(Nicaragua) Ariagner Smith	Panevėžys	14
5	(Lithuania) Edvinas Girdvainis	Kauno Žalgiris	10
6	(Lithuania) Daniel Romanovskij	FA Šiauliai	9
6	(Lithuania) Gratas Sirgėdas	Kauno Žalgiris	9
8	(Romania) Patrick Popescu	Hegelmann	8
9	(Spain) Xabi Auzmendi	Kauno Žalgiris	7
9	(Guadeloupe) Florian David	Kauno Žalgiris	7
9	(Ukraine) Oleksiy Shchebetun	FA Šiauliai	7
9	(Lithuania) Pijus Širvys	Panevėžys	7

==== Hat-tricks ====
Player	For	Against	Result	Date	Ref.
(Brazil) Cesinha	Hegelmann	Banga Gargždai	5–0 (H)	31 March 2023	
(Croatia) Filip Dangubić	Hegelmann	Sūduva	6–0 (H)	28 April 2023	
(Nigeria) Mathias Oyewusi	Žalgiris	Kauno Žalgiris	2–5 (A)	27 June 2023	
(Lithuania) Gratas Sirgėdas	Kauno Žalgiris	Banga Gargždai	3–1 (H)	7 October 2023	

=== Discipline ===
==== Red cards ====
As of match played 12 November 2023

- (Serbia) Nikola Popović - Riteriai vs FA Šiauliai (3 March 2023)
- (Lithuania) Pijus Srėbalius - Žalgiris vs Banga Gargždai (11 March 2023)
- (Lithuania) Augustas Dubickas - Žalgiris vs Sūduva (1 April 2023)
- (France) Brahim Konaté - Dainava vs Kauno Žalgiris (2 April 2023)
- (Lithuania) Vilius Armalas - Hegelmann vs Panevėžys (4 April 2023)
- (Austria) Srđan Spiridonović - Kauno Žalgiris vs Džiugas Telšiai (5 April 2023)
- (Portugal) Braima Candé - Kauno Žalgiris vs Džiugas Telšiai (5 April 2023)
- (Austria) Srđan Spiridonović - Kauno Žalgiris vs Banga Gargždai (28 May 2023)
- (Lithuania) Karolis Žebrauskas - Kauno Žalgiris vs Banga Gargždai (28 May 2023)
- (Lithuania) Sigitas Urbys - Banga Gargždai vs Sūduva (6 June 2023)
- (Lithuania) Tomas Rapalavičius - Džiugas Telšiai vs FA Šiauliai (7 June 2023)
- (Democratic Republic of the Congo) Joël Bopesu - Hegelmann vs Žalgiris (7 June 2023)
- (Lithuania) Gabrielius Micevičius - FA Šiauliai vs Banga Gargždai (10 June 2023)
- (Lithuania) Tomas Švedkauskas - Hegelmann vs Dainava (24 June 2023)
- (Lithuania) Pijus Širvys - Panevėžys vs Riteriai (30 June 2023)
- (Nigeria) Abdullahi Ode - Džiugas Telšiai vs Dainava (1 July 2023)
- (Nigeria) Chibuike Nwosu - Džiugas Telšiai vs Dainava (1 July 2023)
- (Lithuania) Jurgis Jankauskas - Džiugas Telšiai vs Sūduva (29 July 2023)
- (Ukraine) Yevhen Smirnov - Džiugas Telšiai vs Sūduva (29 July 2023)
- (Venezuela) Francisco La Mantía - Riteriai vs Banga Gargždai (5 August 2023)
- (Austria) Denis Bošnjak - Panevėžys vs Hegelmann (7 August 2023)
- (Serbia) Nikola Popović - Riteriai vs Sūduva (18 August 2023)
- (Austria) Denis Bošnjak - Hegelmann vs Kauno Žalgiris (20 August 2023)
- (Venezuela) Francisco La Mantía - Riteriai vs FA Šiauliai (25 August 2023)
- (Bosnia and Herzegovina) Davor Rakić - Dainava vs Riteriai (22 September 2023)
- (Lithuania) Dominykas Kubilinskas - Džiugas Telšiai vs Banga Gargždai (22 September 2023)
- (Belarus) Yury Kendysh - Žalgiris vs Kauno Žalgiris (24 September 2023)
- (Lithuania) Karolis Šilkaitis - Žalgiris vs Kauno Žalgiris (24 September 2023)
- (Argentina) Nicolás Gorobsov - Žalgiris vs Kauno Žalgiris (24 September 2023)
- (Brazil) Hugo Figueiredo - Kauno Žalgiris vs Hegelmann (29 October 2023)
- (Lithuania) Sigitas Urbys - Džiugas Telšiai vs FA Šiauliai (4 November 2023)

== Attendances ==
#	Football club	Average attendance
1	FK Žalgiris	1,014
2	FA Šiauliai	865
3	DFK Dainava	862
4	FK Panevėžys	662
5	FK Banga Gargždai	629
6	FK Kauno Žalgiris	511
7	FK Sūduva	407
8	FC Džiugas Telšiai	391
9	FK Riteriai	232
10	FC Hegelmann	226

== See also ==
- Football in Lithuania
