= FK Vilnius (2019) =

Lithuanian association football club

- Full name: Futbolo Klubas Vilnius
- Founded: 2019; 6 years ago, as FK Vilnius
- Ground: Fabijoniškių gimnazijos Stadium
- Chairman: Stasys Petrauskas
- Manager: Igoris Morinas
- League: II Lyga
- Website: https://fkvilnius.lt/team/?lang=en
Home colours	Away colours

Futbolo Klubas Vilnius or FK Vilnius is a Lithuanian football club based in Vilnius. It plays its home matches at the Fabijoniškių gimnazijos Stadium.

== History ==
FK Vilnius was founded in January 2019. The club created a venture with Baltijos Futbolo Akademija (BFA), which had been participating in I Lyga. BFA successfully went through the licensing process in order to acquire the 2019 I Lyga licence. After BFA was granted the license, it requested name change to FK Vilnius. At the beginning of the 2020 LFF I Lyga season, Baltijos Futbolo Akademija and FK Vilnius have split up. BFA licensed to I Lyga, whilst FK Vilnius continued in II Lyga, and a youth football academy "Vilnius Kickers" was established.

== Name history ==
- Until 2019: Baltijos Futbolo Akademija (BFA)
- 2019–present: FK Vilnius
