= Telšiai Central Stadium =

Sports venue in Telšiai, Lithuania

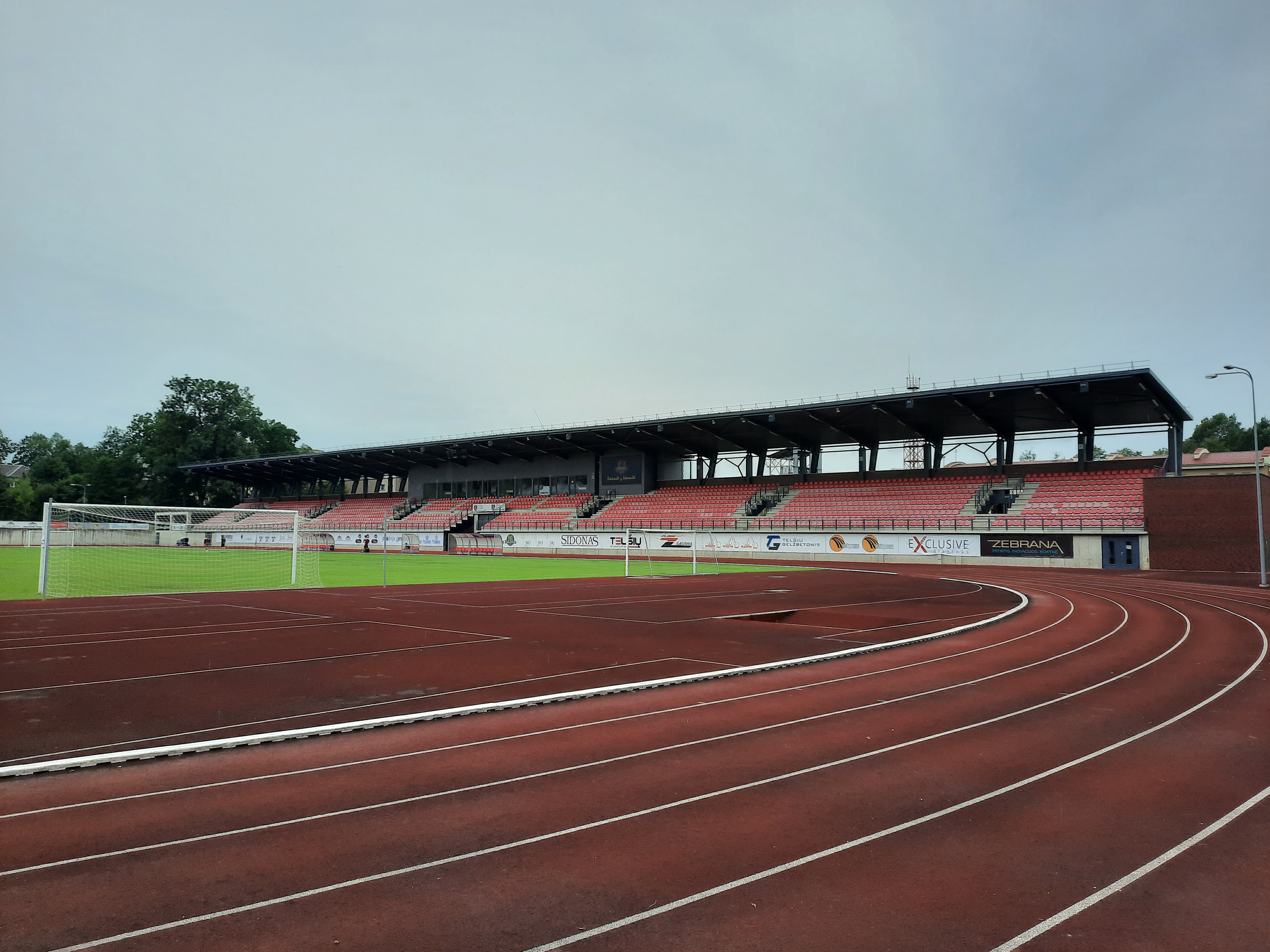
- Stadium in 2020
- Interactive map of Telšiai Central Stadium
- Location: Telšiai, Lithuania
- Coordinates: 55.986978°N 22.248554°E
- Capacity: 2,250
- Surface: Grass

Construction
- Renovated: 2015

Tenant
- FC Džiugas Telšiai (2014–)

The Telšiai Central Stadium is an association football stadium in Telšiai, Lithuania with seating for 2,250 spectators. It is home to A Lyga club FC Džiugas Telšiai.

== History ==
The stadium and the surrounding sports facilities were renovated beginning in 2015. In addition to association football, the stadium has hosted matches of the Lithuania national rugby union team.
