= Marius Stankevičius =

Lithuanian footballer (born 1981)

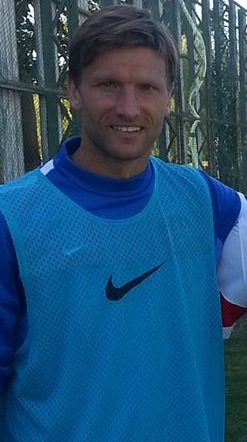

Personal information
- Date of birth: 15 July 1981 (age 45)
- Place of birth: Kaunas, Lithuanian SSR, Soviet Union
- Height: 1.90 m (6 ft 3 in)
- Position: Defender

Team information
- Current team: TransINVEST (head coach)

Senior career*
Years	Team	Apps	(Gls)
1998–2001	Ekranas	87	(3)
2001–2008	Brescia	157	(12)
2002–2003	→ Cosenza (loan)	8	(0)
2008–2011	Sampdoria	44	(3)
2010	→ Sevilla (loan)	16	(0)
2010–2011	→ Valencia (loan)	20	(2)
2011–2013	Lazio	26	(3)
2013–2014	Gaziantepspor	29	(0)
2014–2015	Hannover 96	2	(0)
2015–2016	Córdoba	37	(0)
2016–2017	Robur Siena	27	(0)
2017–2018	Crema	38	(0)
Total		491	(23)

International career
2001–2013	Lithuania	65	(5)
2018	Padania	6	(0)

Managerial career
- 2018–2019: Crema
- 2020–2021: Lumezzane
- 2021–2022: Lithuania U21
- 2023: Kauno Žalgiris
- 2024–: TransINVEST
- * Club domestic league appearances and goals

Marius Stankevičius (born 15 July 1981) is a Lithuanian professional football manager and former player who works as head coach of Toplyga club TransINVEST. A former defender, he was the Lithuanian Player of the Year in 2008 and 2009.

== International career ==
Stankevičius has also played as a defender for the Lithuania national team. In the past, he represented Lithuania at under-21 level. He was captain of the Lithuanian side during the 2012–13 qualifying campaign due to Tomas Danilevičius's retirement, but has not made an appearance since the September 2013 loss to Latvia.

Due to playing in northern Italy, Stankevičius received a call-up for the Padania national team ahead of the 2018 ConIFA World Football Cup.

== Coaching career ==
On 17 November 2018, Stankevičius was appointed as manager of Crema following the departure of Massimiliano Bressan, during a season, where he was supposed to function as a player. He left the club at the end of the season.

In January 2020 he was presented as the new U-17 coach of the Lithuania national football team and Valdas Urbonas's assistant for the senior team.

In July 2020 he was named new head coach of Italian Eccellenza amateurs Lumezzane, while still keeping his coaching position with the Lithuanian national teams. Following his appointment as new head coach of the Lithuania national under-21 football team, Stankevičius left Lumezzane in July 2021.

In October 2022, Stankevičius obtained a UEFA Pro coaching license after successfully passing the yearly course organized by the Italian Football Federation.

== Career statistics ==
=== Club ===
As of 15 June 2016

Appearances and goals by club, season and competition
Club	Season	League			National cup (Note: Includes Coppa Italia, Turkish Cup)		Europe		Other		Total	
Club	Season	Division	Apps	Goals	Apps	Goals	Apps	Goals	Apps	Goals	Apps	Goals
Ekranas (loan)	2001	A Lyga					2 (Note: Appearances in UEFA Intertoto Cup)	0	—		2	0
Brescia	2001–02	Serie A	2	0	0	0	—		—		2	0
Brescia	2002–03	Serie A	6	0	1	0	—		—		7	0
Brescia	2003–04	Serie A	15	0	2	0	3	0	—		20	0
Brescia	2004–05	Serie A	33	3	2	0	—		—		35	3
Brescia	2005–06	Serie B	33	5	4	1	—		—		37	6
Brescia	2006–07	Serie B	38	3	5	0	—		—		43	3
Brescia	2007–08	Serie B	30	0	3	0	—		—		33	0
Brescia	Total		157	11	17	1	3	0	—		177	12
Cosenza (loan)	2002–03	Serie B	8	0	0	0	—		—		8	0
Sampdoria	2008–09	Serie A	29	3	5	0	8 (Note: Appearances in UEFA Cup)	0	—		42	3
Sampdoria	2009–10	Serie A	14	0	2	0	—		—		16	0
Sampdoria	2010–11	Serie A	0	0	0	0	2 (Note: Appearances in UEFA Champions League)	0	—		2	0
Sampdoria	Total		43	3	7	0	10	0	—		60	3
Sevilla (loan)	2009–10	La Liga	16	0	2	0	2	0	—		20	0
Valencia (loan)	2010–11	La Liga	21	2	4	0	—		—		25	2
Lazio	2011–12	Serie A	11	0	1	0	1 (Note: Appearance in UEFA Europa League)	0	—		13	0
Lazio	2012–13	Serie A	3	0	0	0	—		—		3	0
Lazio	Total		14	0	1	0	1	0	—		16	0
Gaziantepspor	2013–14	Süper Lig	29	0	1	0	—		—		30	0
Hannover 96	2014–15	Bundesliga	2	0	0	0	—		—		2	0
Hannover 96 II	2014–15	Regionalliga Nord	2	0	—		—		—		2	0
Córdoba	2015–16	Segunda División	37	0	0	0	—		2	0	39	0
Siena	2016–17	Lega Pro	27	0	0	0	—		—		27	0
Career total			356	16	32	1	18	0	2	0	408	17

=== International ===
Scores and results list Lithuania's goal tally first, score column indicates score after each Stankevičius goal.

List of international goals scored by Marius Stankevičius
No.	Date	Venue	Opponent	Score	Result	Competition
1	30 March 2005	Asim Ferhatović Hase Stadium, Sarajevo, Bosnia and Herzegovina	Bosnia and Herzegovina	1–1	1–1	2006 FIFA World Cup qualification
2	6 September 2008	Gruia stadium, Cluj-Napoca, Romania	Romania	1–0	3–0	2010 FIFA World Cup qualification
3	10 October 2009	Tivoli Neu, Innsbruck, Austria	Austria	1–1	1–2	2010 FIFA World Cup qualification
4	14 October 2009	Sūduva Stadium, Marijampolė, Lithuania	Serbia	2–1	2–1	2010 FIFA World Cup qualification
5	29 March 2011	S. Darius and S. Girėnas Stadium, Kaunas, Lithuania	Spain	1–1	1–3	UEFA Euro 2012 qualification

== Honours ==
=== Player ===
Ekranas

- Lithuanian Cup: 1998, 2000
- Lithuanian Super Cup: 2000

Sampdoria

- Coppa Italia runner-up: 2008–09

Sevilla

- Copa del Rey: 2009–10

Lazio

- Coppa Italia: 2012–13

Individual

- Lithuanian Footballer of the Year: 2008, 2009

=== Manager ===
TransINVEST

- I Lyga: 2025
