= FK Minija (2017) =

Lithuanian football club

F.K. Minija
- Full name: Viešoji įstaiga – futbolo klubas "Minija"
- Founded: 2017
- Ground: Kretinga stadium
- Capacity: 900
- Chairman: Vidas Burba
- Manager: Darius Gvildys
- League: I Lyga
- 2026: I Lyga, 2nd of 16
- Website: http://fkminija.lt
Home colours	Away colours

FK Minija is a semi-professional football club based in Kretinga, Lithuania. The team competes in I Lyga, the second division of Lithuanian football system.

== History ==
After FK Minija Kretinga went bankrupt at the end of 2016 season, the Kretinga football promoters formed a phoenix club at the beginning of 2017.

Football Club "Minija" joined II Lyga's Western Zone in 2017. In that season team took the third place.

In 2018, the football club was reorganized into Public Organisation "Futbolo klubas Minija". Minija finished the season top of the league, equal on points with FK Babrungas Plungė. When this happens, the teams play a "golden match" to determine the higher position in the table. Minija won the match and were declared the winners of II Lyga Western Zone.

In 2019 the club had successfully promoted to I Lyga, and finished the season in 8th position.

On 21 April 2025, the club was bought by French footballer Moussa Dembélé.

== Honours ==
=== League ===
- II Lyga
  - Champions (1): 2018

== Seasons ==
Season	Leval	League	Place	Weblink	Note
2017	3	Antra lyga (West)	3rd		
2018	3	Antra lyga (West)	1st		▲ promotion to Pirma lyga
2019	2	Pirma lyga	8th		
2020	2	Pirma lyga	10th		
2021	2	Pirma lyga	11th		
2022	2	Pirma lyga	13th		
2023	2	Pirma lyga	6th		
2024	2	Pirma lyga	14th		
2025	2	Pirma lyga	9th		

== Kit evoliution ==
Adidas (kit manufacturer) in 2021.

2017 (Home)	2017 (Away)	2018 (Home)	2018 (Away)	2021 (Home)	2021 (Away)

=== Club colours ===
- Blue and white

MINIJA	MINIJA

== Current squad ==
As of 11 February 2026

Note: Flags indicate national team as defined under FIFA eligibility rules; some limited exceptions apply. Players may hold more than one non-FIFA nationality.

No.	Pos.	Nation	Player
1	GK	UKR	Amir Ahalarov
22	GK	LTU	Aleksas Pipiras
5	DF	LTU	Ernestas Mockus
7	DF	LTU	Deividas Šiuša
13	DF	BRA	Luiz Octavio
16	DF	LTU	Lukas Gujis
21	DF	LTU	Vilius Kazlauskas
6	MF	JPN	Takuya Fushimi
8	MF	LTU	Deividas Pipiras
9	MF	BRA	Saimon

No.	Pos.	Nation	Player
10	MF	JPN	Hiroshi Miyazawa
12	MF	LTU	Aronas Zakarauskas
14	MF	LTU	Germanas Vaniuchinas
15	MF	LTU	Valdas Jasmontas
19	MF	LTU	Matas Keblys
20	MF	LTU	Adrijus Putvinas
25	MF	LTU	Jonas Kazlauskas
45	MF	LTU	Mantas Gedutis
—	MF	LTU	Karolis Šutovičius
11	FW	LTU	Dominykas Jakociunas
18	FW	LTU	Rokas Rusys
—	FW	MLI	Mamadou Traoré

== Staff ==
Position	Name
Chairman	(Lithuania) Vidas Burba
Director of football	
Head coach	(Lithuania) Darius Gvildys
Assistant coach	(Lithuania) Arvydas Balsevičius

== Coaches ==
- (Lithuania) Vaidas Liutikas, (before 2017 season — 14 May 2017)
- (Lithuania) Arvydas Balsevičius, (14 May 2017 – end of 2018 season)
- (Lithuania) Valdas Trakys (January 2019 – July 2020)
- (Lithuania) Gvidas Juška (from July 2020 – the end of 2021 season).
- (Lithuania) Darius Žindulis, (from Januari 2022)
- (Brazil) Thiago Bomfim, from February 2023 m. – March 2025
- (Lithuania) Martynas Viluckas, from April 2025
- (Portugal) André Marques, May–July 2025
- (Portugal) Ricardo Freitas, from August 2025
- (Lithuania) Darius Gvildys (from 3 January 2026)
