= FK Jonava =

Lithuanian football club

- Full name: Futbolo klubas Jonava
- Founded: 1946; 80 years ago
- Ground: Central Stadium of Jonava
- Capacity: 2,580
- Chairman: Eisvinas Utyra
- Manager: Rolandas Čepkauskas
- League: I Lyga
- 2026: I Lyga, 11th of 16
- Website: http://www.fkjonava.lt/
Home colours	Away colours

Football Club Jonava, previously (1996–2016) known as Football Club Lietava, is a Lithuanian professional football club based in Jonava. The club gained promotion to the A lyga as champions of the I Lyga in 2015, but were relegated from A Lyga in 2018.

== History ==
The club was founded in 1991 as Azotas (after the name of the local Azotas fertilizer factory), the name Lietava was adopted in 1996.

For a number of years the club played in the second tier of the Lithuanian football championship. After successful 2015 season, Lietava won the I Lyga in 2015 and were promoted to the A lyga.

The 2016 debut season in the A Lyga Lietava finished in 5th position.

From the beginning of the 2017 season, Lietava changed its name to FK Jonava. On 13 February 2017 Lithuanian Football Federation approved the name change. The 2017 season was the best season for the club on record. The team took 6th place in the regular A Lyga season, and finished in the 4th position after the championship round.

For 2018 season club management had ambitious plans. On 11 January 2018, Felipe Ribeiro from Portugal started in a position of the new head coach. But the club ran into problems and on 15 May 2018, the coach was let go. Soon the head coach changed again. The third coach in one season could not save the team from relegation. After the regular season the team took 8th position and ended its spell in the A lyga.

In 2022 was promoted to A Lyga.

== Name and logo history ==
Logo of FK Lietava used until 2016

Logo of FC Jonava used until 2023

- 1991 – Azotas
- 1994 – Achema-Lietava
- 1996 – Lietava
- 2017 – Jonava

== Stadium ==
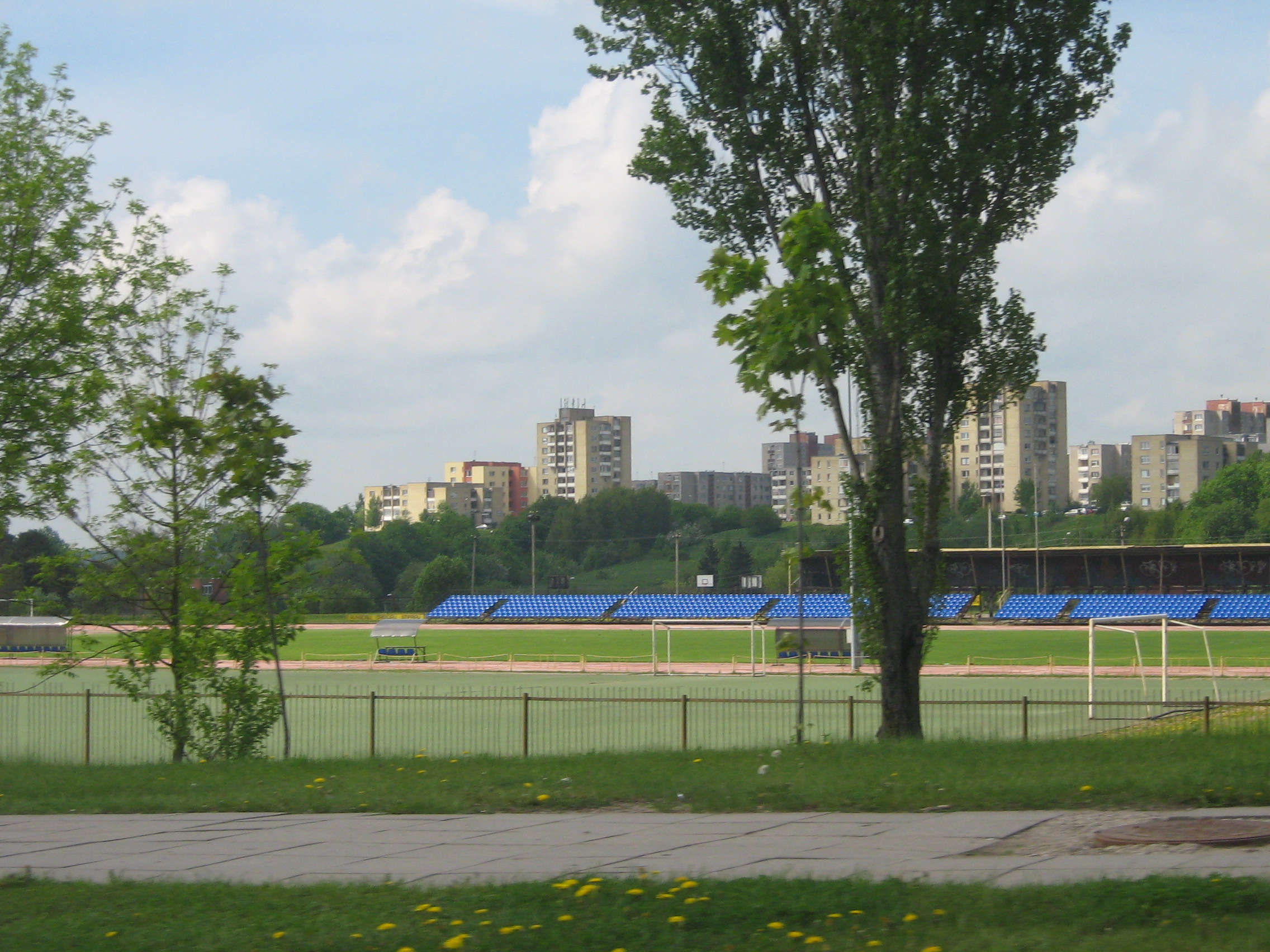

The Central Stadium of Jonava is the multi-purpose stadium used as the club's home ground.

== Kit ==
2016 (home)	2016 (away)	2017 (home)	2017 (away)	2018 (GK kit)

== Seasons ==
Season	Tier	Place	LFF Cup
1990	II (East)	4	—
1991	III (East)	3	—
1991–92	III (South)	1	—
1992–93	II	1	Round of 16
1993–94	II	9	Quarterfinal
1994–95	II	6	Round of 16
1995–96	II	10	Round of 16
1996–97	II	10	—
1997–98	II	4	Round of 16
1998–99	II	1	Round of 16
1999-00	II	7	Quarterfinal
2000–01	II	5	—
2001–02	II	5	Quarterfinal
2002–03	II	8	1/16 f.
2003	II	11	Quarterfinal
2004	II	7	—
2005	II	9	Quarterfinal
2006	II	14	Quarterfinal
2007	II	5	Round of 16
2008	II	8	Quarterfinal
2009	II	7	Round of 32
2010–11	II	5	Round of 32
2011	II	5	Round of 16
2012	II	1	Quarterfinal
2013	II	7	Round of 32
2014	II	7	Round of 32
2015	II	1	Quarterfinal
2016	I	6	Round of 16
2017	I	4	Quarterfinal
2018	I	8	Quarterfinal
2019	II	9	Round 2
2020	II	3	Round of 16
2021	II	2	First round
2022	I	10	Quarterfinal

== Jonava B ==
The Jonava B team played in the II Lyga in 2018 season. However, after the main team was relegated, Jonava B was withdrawn.

== Squad ==
As of 5 April, 2026

Note: Flags indicate national team as defined under FIFA eligibility rules; some limited exceptions apply. Players may hold more than one non-FIFA nationality.

No.	Pos.	Nation	Player
3	DF	LTU	Karolis Šutovičius
6	DF	BRA	Hugo Figueredo
7	MF	LTU	Matas Mirončikas
9	MF	LTU	Aurimas Raginis
10	MF	LTU	Nikas Benevičius
11	MF	LTU	Renatas Banevičius
13	MF	ITA	Tommaso Drusian
14	DF	LTU	Pijus Nainys
17	FW	JPN	Koki Oda
18	MF	NGR	Kabir Adetunji
19	FW	LTU	Airidas Kabošius
22	MF	LTU	Kostas Kukta
23	MF	LTU	Artūras Rocys

No.	Pos.	Nation	Player
24	GK	LTU	Martynas Matuzas
25	MF	CAN	Adrian Rosero
31	FW	LTU	Nedas Matačiūnas
33	GK	LTU	Emilis Urbonas
35	GK	LTU	Vejas Jakimavičius
44	MF	LTU	Tomas Dombrauskis
55	GK	LTU	Majus Krasinskas
77	FW	LTU	Kipras Keliauskas
80	MF	FRA	Younes Houat
88	MF	LTU	Aidas Rybelis
90	MF	LTU	Tadas Eliošius
96	MF	LTU	Motiejus Neverdauskas

== Staff ==
Position	Name
Chairman	(Lithuania) Eisvinas Utyra
Director of football	(Lithuania) Džeraldas Rocys
Head coach	(Lithuania) Rolandas Čepkauskas
Data analyst	(Lithuania) Tadas Vilkevičius

== Honours ==
- I Lyga
  - Champions (4): 1992–93, 1998–99, 2012, 2015

== Sources ==
- Livescore - Football livescores
