= FA Šiauliai =

Šiauliai
- Full name: Football Academy of Šiauliai
- Nickname: šiauliečiai
- Founded: 1 September 2007; 19 years ago
- Ground: Savivaldybė Stadium
- Capacity: 3,030
- Chairman: Deivis Kančelskis (chief of team)
- League: TOPLYGA
- 2026: TOPLYGA, 9th of 10
Home colours	Away colours

Football Academy of Šiauliai or FA Šiauliai is a Lithuanian football academy from the city of Šiauliai. The team is simply known as "Šiauliai". The academy train women's and men's teams, as well as children's and underage groups in "U" type championships. The men's team currently play in TOPLYGA, the top tier of Lithuanian football.

== History ==
Football Academy of Šiauliai was established in 2007, after a merger between Napolis Šiauliai and "Klevas" school of sport.

=== Men's team ===
Men's football team participates under name FA Šiauliai.

In 2010 and 2016 the team played in Šiauliai region championship of the III Lyga (4th tier).

In 2017 and 2018 team played in II Lyga (3rd tier). In 2017 the team achieved 4th position and 6th in 2018.

In 2018 Lithuanian Football Cup, FA Šiauliai lost to FK Sūduva 0:7 in 1/32 round.

In 2019 FA Šiauliai applied for a license to play in I Lyga (2nd tier), despite the fact that they finished 6th in 2018 II Lyga. The club failed to satisfy licensing criteria, and I Lyga license was not issued. However, the club was granted an exception, the club played in 2019 LFF I Lyga and finished in 6th position.

In 2021, FA Šiauliai applied for a license to play in A Lyga (Top tier) for the first time in history from next season.

=== Futsal team ===
FA Šiauliai men's futsal team joined the top division Futsal A Lyga in 2019-2020 season.

== Recent seasons ==
Lithuanian championship
Season	Level	League	Place	Reference
2010	4	III Lyga (Šiauliai)	9th	
2016	4	III Lyga (Šiauliai)	6th	
2017	3	II Lyga (West)	4th	
2018	3	II Lyga (West)	6th	
2019	2	I Lyga	6th	
2020	2	I Lyga	5th	
2021	2	I Lyga	1st	
2022	1	A Lyga	7th	
2023	1	A Lyga	3rd	
2024	1	A Lyga	7th	
2025	1	A Lyga	5th	

Futsal A Lyga
Season	Level	League	Regular season	Play-off
2019-2020	1.	Futsal A Lyga	4.	quarterfinal

== Stadium ==
Savivaldybė Stadium (Municipality stadium) is a multi-purpose stadium in Šiauliai, Lithuania. It is currently used mostly for football matches, and is the home stadium of FA Šiauliai. The stadium capacity is 4,000. The stadium is located at: S. Daukanto g. 23, Šiauliai.

== European record ==
Season	Competition	Round	Club	Home	Away	Aggregate
2024–25	UEFA Conference League	1QR	(Estonia) FCI Levadia	0–2	0−0	0–2

Notes

- QR: Qualifying round

== FA Šiauliai B ==
FA Šiauliai 'B' team is currently (2026) playing in the I Lyga (second tier).

== Current squad ==
As of 20 July, 2026

Note: Flags indicate national team as defined under FIFA eligibility rules; some limited exceptions apply. Players may hold more than one non-FIFA nationality.

No.	Pos.	Nation	Player
1	GK	LTU	Vilius Šivickas
2	DF	LTU	Nojus Stankevičius
4	DF	LTU	Martynas Dapkus
7	FW	LTU	Nedas Garbaliauskas
8	MF	UKR	Artiom Baftalovskij
10	MF	LTU	Gabrielius Micevičius
11	MF	LTU	Arvydas Novikovas
12	GK	LTU	Paulius Linkevičius
13	MF	LTU	Daniel Romanovskij
14	MF	LTU	Karolis Žebrauskas
17	DF	BIH	Harun Hadžibeganović
18	MF	LTU	Emilis Gasiūnas
20	DF	LTU	Kajus Mikoliūnas
21	DF	SRB	Marko Mandić

No.	Pos.	Nation	Player
22	MF	LTU	Patrikas Pranckus
23	MF	POR	Benny
27	DF	LTU	Danielius Jarašius
29	MF	LTU	Deividas Dovydaitis
30	MF	LTU	Ugnius Vaitiekaitis
32	MF	LTU	Gabijus Micevičius
33	DF	SRB	Lazar Vuković
41	MF	LTU	Klemensas Gustas
50	DF	LTU	Edgaras Bierontas
51	MF	LTU	Gustas Geštautas
61	GK	LTU	Gustas Baliutavičius
99	GK	LTU	Ignas Aleksandravičius

=== Out on loan ===
Note: Flags indicate national team as defined under FIFA eligibility rules; some limited exceptions apply. Players may hold more than one non-FIFA nationality.

No.	Pos.	Nation	Player

== Famous players ==
See Category:FA Šiauliai players

== Managers ==
- (Lithuania) Renatas Vestartas (since 2017 till the end of 2020 season)
- (Lithuania) Mindaugas Čepas (2021–2024);
- (Latvia) Dainis Kazakevičs (13 December 2024 – 9 November 2025)
- (Latvia) Jurgis Pučinsks (since 11 November 2025 – 13 April 2026)
- (Lithuania) Mantas Kuklys (2026)
- (Lithuania) Dovydas Lastauskas (2026) interim;
