= FC Džiugas Telšiai =

Lithuanian football club

Džiugas Telšiai
- Full name: Telšių "Džiugas"
- Founded: 23 November 1923; 102 years ago as SA Džiugas; 1991; 35 years ago as FK Džiugas (re-established); 2014; 12 years ago as FC Džiugas
- Ground: Telšiai Central Stadium
- Capacity: 2,400
- Chairman: Martynas Armalis
- Manager: Andrius Lipskis
- League: TOPLYGA
- 2026: TOPLYGA, 6th of 10
- Website: http://www.fcdziugas.lt/
Home colours	Away colours

Football Club Džiugas Telšiai, commonly known as Džiugas Telšiai, or simply as Džiugas, is a Lithuanian association football club based in Telšiai, that competes in the TOPLYGA, top tier of Lithuanian football.

== History ==
On the 2 November 1923, sport association Džiugas was established in Telšiai. Between 1923 and 1946, the club had football, basketball, ice hockey teams and expanded to other sports of the city. In 1926, Džiugas merged with another sports club "Laimutė" and had 145 official club members. The first director of the board was S. Lukošius. On the 6 June 1927, the football team played their first game against the Lithuanian bicyclist union which finished 2:2. In 1935, 1936, and 1937, Džiugas became the champions of the Samogitia region. Other participants of the tournament were teams from Plungė, Skouodas, Tauragė and Mažeikiai. Džiugas played their first international game in 1938 against Latvian side "Olimpija" and won 2:1.

In 1946, Džiugas was attached to state-wide sports union "Žalgiris" and the team participated in lower Lithuanian SSR football divisions.

In 1992–1993 season Džiugas became the champions of the III league but in 1994, the team was dissolved and a new Telšai team "Mastis" was formed.

In 2014, the club was reestablished by the football community of Telšiai. In their first season in II lyga (3rd tier), the club won 2nd place and gained promotion to I lyga (2nd tier), and has been participating in it since.

Before the start of the 2019 season, head coach Vijūnas Vasiliauskas was replaced by retired club player Marius Šluta. In 2019, Džiugas won the I Lyga, and gained promotion to the A Lyga. However, the club failed to meet licensing criteria to the A Lyga, and remained in I Lyga for the 2020 season.

They were in 4th position in LFF I Lyga and was promoted to A Lyga. At 2021 season club made debut in A Lyga and was in 8th position.

In the middle of 2022 A Lyga season club changed head coach. João Manuel Lopez Prates replaced Marius Šluta. In their second season in A Lyga, they were at 9th place and played relegation play-off against FK Neptūnas. First match in Klaipėda Džiugas Club won 4-0 and second match in Telšiai won 1–0. Aggregate result was 5-0 and they managed to save their place in A Lyga.

== Honours ==
=== League ===
- I Lyga
  - Winners (1): 2019
- II Lyga
  - Runners-up (1): 2014

== Recent seasons ==
Season	Tier	League	Position	Web	Notes
2014	3.	Antra lyga	2.		▲ Promotion
2015	2.	Pirma lyga	10.		
2016	2.	Pirma lyga	7.		
2017	2.	Pirma lyga	5.		
2018	2.	Pirma lyga	5.		
2019	2.	Pirma lyga	1.		
2020	2.	Pirma lyga	4.		▲ Promotion
2021	1.	A lyga	8.		
2022	1.	A lyga	9.		
2023	1.	A lyga	9.		
2024	1.	A lyga	6.		
2025	1.	A lyga	7.		

== Current squad ==
As of 23 July 2026

Note: Flags indicate national team as defined under FIFA eligibility rules; some limited exceptions apply. Players may hold more than one non-FIFA nationality.

No.	Pos.	Nation	Player
1	GK	LTU	Marius Paukštė
2	DF	NED	Valentino Vermeulen
3	DF	LTU	Džiugas Aleksa
4	DF	SEN	Bacary Sane
5	DF	LTU	Milanas Rutkovskis
6	MF	LTU	Nikita Pavlovskij
7	MF	BRA	Pedro Bahia
8	MF	UKR	Denys Bunchukov
9	FW	ARG	Iker Scotto
10	MF	LTU	Vilius Piliukaitis
14	MF	LTU	Denis Ževžikovas
22	GK	UKR	Mykyta Rybchynskyi

No.	Pos.	Nation	Player
23	DF	CIV	Ibrahim Cissé
27	MF	LTU	Deitonas Vinckus
30	MF	LTU	Nidas Vosylius
33	MF	LTU	Lukas Ankudinovas
44	DF	NGR	Brendan Asomugha
46	DF	POL	Jakub Wawszczyk
48	FW	LTU	Tomas Stelmokas (on loan from Kauno Žalgiris)
70	FW	BFA	Abou Ouattara
77	FW	BRA	Andrézinho
90	FW	ENG	Ronald Sobowale
91	GK	UKR	Vladyslav Ryabenko
97	MF	LTU	Airik Balasanov

== Staff ==
Position	Name
Director	(Lithuania) Martynas Armalis
Head coach	(Lithuania) Andrius Lipskis
Assistant coach	(Lithuania)

== Kit evoliution ==
Kit evolutions (home matches and away)

2017–2018	2017–2018	2025	2025	2026

Kit manufacturers

- (Spain) Joma (2014–2025)
- (Germany) Puma (2026–present)
