= Baltijos Futbolo Akademija =

Lithuanian association football club

- Full name: Baltijos Futbolo Akademija
- Founded: 2007
- Ground: Sportima Arena
- Capacity: 3,157
- Chairman: Ivan Švabovič
- League: I Lyga
- 2026: I Lyga, 6th of 16
- Website: Official website
Home colours	Away colours

Baltijos Futbolo Akademija, BFA is a Lithuanian professional football club based in Vilnius, established as an extension of the youth football academy.

== History ==
The football academy was established in 2007. The club has been participating in the children and youth championships organized by the Lithuanian Football Federation, as well as international tournaments.

=== 2018 ===
The BFA took part in the LFF II Lyga championship for the first time. The team finished in eighth position, and announced that the team will seek I Lyga license.

=== 2019 ===
The BFA did not qualify for promotion to I Lyga, however the club applied for a license anyway and after an appeal was awarded with one, having met the league criteria. The BFA entered into partnership with FK Vilnius, who offered an addition of several senior players. The venture took on FK Vilnius name, which was approved by the Lithuanian Football Federation. The team was allowed to participate in I Lyga under the BFA license. The league newcomer was expected to fight for higher places in the league and possibly of promotion to the top tier A Lyga. However, the club struggled and were in the relegation zone for the first half of the season. They improved in the second half and managed to finish 11th.

=== 2020 ===
The club announced that the partnership with FK Vilnius is coming to an end. FK Vilnius announced that they are withdrawing from the I Lyga, and will seek the II Lyga license, whereas BFA wanted to continue in the I Lyga. In February, the I Lyga license was approved.

== Seasons ==
Season	Tier	League	Position	Web	Notes
2018	3	II Lyga	8th		▲ Promotion to I Lyga
2019	2	I Lyga	11th		(as FK Vilnius)
2020	2	I Lyga	13th		
2021	2	I Lyga	12th		
2022	2	I Lyga	7th		
2024	2.	Pirma lyga	9th		
2025	2.	Pirma lyga	5.		

== Current squad ==
Note: Flags indicate national team as defined under FIFA eligibility rules; some limited exceptions apply. Players may hold more than one non-FIFA nationality.

No.	Pos.	Nation	Player
4	DF	LTU	Andrius Kežūnas
7	FW	UKR	Renat Shvedchenko
8	MF	LTU	Justas Gerbutavičius
10	MF	LTU	Artiom Osipovič
14	DF	LTU	Ignas Pukinskas
16	DF	UKR	Maksym Lukashevych
17	MF	UKR	Stanislav Brykov
20	MF	LTU	Ailandas Alonderis
21	FW	LTU	Rafał Kudzin
24	MF	LTU	Daniel Misiūnas
25	GK	UKR	Kiril Ostapenko

No.	Pos.	Nation	Player
26	MF	UKR	Vadym Karlash
30	DF	CIV	Eric Sabitu
48	DF	LTU	Aidas Šidlauskas
51	DF	LTU	Justas Vareika
53	MF	LTU	Rokas Vilkuotis
57	GK	LTU	Matas Arbočius
74	DF	LTU	Ąžuolas Indriulis
76	GK	LTU	Ugnius Semaška
77	FW	LTU	Žygimantas Jurevičius
89	MF	LTU	Ignas Paulikas
99	FW	LTU	Karolis Sargiūnas

== Managers ==
- (Lithuania) Domas Paulauskas (2019)
- (Lithuania) Ivan Švabovič (2020)
- (Lithuania) Andžėj Falčik (2021)
- (Lithuania) Haroldas Šidlauskas (2021–2024)
- (Spain) David Muslera Rodríguez (December 2024– July 2026)
