= Football in Lithuania =

- Country: Lithuania
- Governing body: Lithuanian Football Federation
- National team: men's national team
- First played: 1892; 134 years ago
- Registered players: 25,287 (2018); ~30,000 (2021)

Club competitions
- League: A Lyga I Lyga II Lyga III Lyga SFL; Cups: Lithuanian Football Cup Lithuanian Supercup

International competitions
- National Team: World Cup European Championship Nations League Baltic Cup; Clubs: Champions League Europa League Conference League

Football is one of the top two most popular sports Lithuania by the quantity of active sportsmen. However, with only 52,000 match spectators a year (2019) in all top league matches, it falls far behind country's most popular sport, basketball. Other variations of football like futsal, 5-a-side to 8-a-side football, beach soccer have become fairly popular as well.

The former Soviet republic made their return as an independent football nation in 1992. In the qualification for the Euro 2004, Lithuania held Germany to a 1–1 draw in Germany and won against Scotland. In the qualification for Euro 2008 they played away to the 2006 World Cup winners Italy and drew 1–1. They also defeated Romania 3–0 in Lithuania, in another shock performance.

== History ==
In 1922 in Lithuania first local soccer championships began, largest ones being in Kaunas, Klaipėda and Šiauliai counties. Since 1931 a country-wide soccer championships were held regularly each year.

During soviet occupation, some Lithuanian soccer clubs participated in USSR football championship, whereas others chose to play in Lithuanian SSR league. After regaining the independence in 1991, the Lithuanian football league system was restored.

According to a television audience survey, the group stage broadcasts of the 2010 FIFA World Cup from South Africa were viewed by approximately 80% of Lithuania's population, 74% of Estonia's population and 64% of Latvia's population. Lithuania recorded the highest viewership percentage among the Baltic states.

== Domestic football ==
The highest current men's football league – A Lyga, the second tier I Lyga, and the third tier is II Lyga were founded in 1991 by the Lithuanian Football Federation. The fourth tier III Lyga championships are organized by 10 county football federations. The fifth tier competitions are organized by Vilnius Region Football Federation, and called the Sunday Football League. At one stage the SFL expanded country-wide, but then contracted back to Vilnius Region only. At the moment, lower than fourth tier competitions are organized at county, region, or city level, and often as 8-a-side or 7-a-side competitions. Some cities organize Company leagues, where team members are employees of the company. Veteran football is also played as a separate championship, at 35+, 50+, 60+ levels. Children and youth football is highly popular and strongly supported by Lithuanian Football Federation with a view to develop more professional players and increase the popularity of the sport.

At the end of the season, the A Lyga winners will be awarded the LFF Championship Cup and the transitional LFF Champions Cup, which will acquire the right to represent Lithuania in the UEFA Champions League and the UEFA Europa League. The last placed team in the A league is relegated to I Lyga, and the winner of I Lyga is promoted to A Lyga. The team placed one before last plays a playoff game with second placed team in the I Lyga. The number of teams in I Lyga is maximum 16, however it fluctuates each year. Bottom 2-4 teams are relegated to II Lyga, and the winners of each II Lyga groups gain promotion to I Lyga. However, in recent years due to the lack of participating clubs, frequent club collapses, and changing financial fortunes, the promotion and relegation rules are not frequently followed. It is rather the licensing process that determines which league clubs are able to play each year.

== League system ==
=== Men ===
Tier	Leagues and Divisions
1	A Lyga; 10 clubs from 2021 onwards. 8 clubs between 2016 and 2019, and approximately 10 between 2012 and 2015
	↓↑ 1–2 clubs
2	I Lyga; 14 teams in 2021. Number of teams is fluctuating between 12 and 16
	↓↑ 2 - 4 clubs
3	II Lyga; 20 teams in a single 2021 league. For the last decade the league mostly consisted of two zones - the South and the West Zone, consisting of 8 - 16 teams. Before that North and East Zones also existed, with 5 - 12 teams in each.
	↓↑ 2 - 4 clubs
4	III Lyga; 50 teams in 5 zones in 2021. Counties that organized zone championships were Vilnius, Klaipėda, Šiauliai, Panevėžys, and a joint Kaunas—Marijampolė zone.
	↓↑ 0 clubs. Separate licensing processes.
5	SFL; 44 teams in 4 vertical divisions in 2021. In recent years the competition only takes place in Vilnius Region.

=== Women ===
Level	League
1	A Lyga
2	LMFA I lyga

== Attendances ==
The Lithuanian top-flight football league attendances in 2025:

#	Club	Average	Highest
1	Kauno Žalgiris	1,841	6,675
2	Žalgiris	869	2,285
3	Sūduva	815	1,578
4	Džiugas	661	948
5	Šiauliai	616	1,473
6	Banga	529	751
7	Dainava	412	713
8	Hegelmann	406	857
9	Panevėžys	383	701
10	Riteriai	238	1,135

The average attendance per top-flight football league season and the club with the highest average attendance:

Season	League average	Best club	Best club average
2025	676	Kauno Žalgiris	1,841
2024	567	Žalgiris	929
2023	580	Žalgiris	1,014
