= II Lyga =

LFF II Lyga
- Founded: 1991; 35 years ago
- Country: Lithuania
- Number of clubs: 16 (In A division); 12 (In B division)
- Level on pyramid: 3
- Promotion to: I Lyga
- Relegation to: III Lyga
- Current champions: FK Transinvest B (A division); Vilnius Football Academy (B division (2025)
- Current: 2026 II Lyga

Lithuanian Football Federation's II lyga, LFF II lyga is the third tier Lithuanian football championship. As of 2021, the II lyga is a single league, consisting of planned 16 teams. The two top teams gain promotion to the I Lyga.

Until the end of 2020 season the league consisted of the Southern Zone and the Western Zone. The Northern Zone and the Eastern Zone existed in some past seasons, but were done away with due to the dwindling number of participating clubs

In 2024, a B Division was established following an increase in the number of teams.

== League Structure ==
=== Southern Zone ===
The zone has existed since 1999 until 2020. Kaunas County Football Federation was in charge of the competition in this zone.

=== Eastern Zone ===
The zone existed in 2015 and 2016, however, due to a club mass withdrawal from the competition, the zone was done away with, and the remaining clubs joined the Southern Zone. Vilnius region football union was in charge of the competition in this zone.

=== Western Zone ===
In 2007 the zone was merged into the Northern Zone and ceased to exist. In 2008 the Northern Zone was renamed the Western Zone. The zone existed until 2020. Telšiai County Football Federation was in charge of the competition in this zone.

=== Northern Zone ===
The zone existed from 2002 to 2007, afterwards it was renamed the Western Zone. Telšiai County Football Federation was in charge of the competition in this zone.

== Recent Seasons ==
The 2021 season was the first season in single league format, doing away with the Southern Zone and the Western Zone. The league was planned to be 16-team competition, however, 20 teams were allowed to participate. Because of this, the format was changed to 1.5 rounds - after playing the first round, the league was split into top and bottom groups. The teams played the second round among the teams of its group. As the 2021 I lyga only had 14 teams instead of planned 16, 4 teams qualified for promotion this season.

In the 2022 season, 22 teams attempted to license to II lyga. Although the league was planned to be a 16-team competition, in the end 18 teams were granted licenses.

== See also ==
- LFF I Lyga
- A Lyga
- Lithuanian Football Cup
