= 2018 Lithuanian Football Cup =

LFF Taurė

Tournament details
- Country: Lithuania
- Dates: 27 April – 30 September
- Teams: 48

Final positions
- Champions: FK Žalgiris
- Runners-up: FC Stumbras

The 2018 Lithuanian Football Cup, also known as LFF Cup, was the seventy-third season of the Lithuanian annual football knock-out tournament. Forty-eight teams entered the competitions, which started on 27 April and ended on 30 September.

The winners qualify for the 2019–20 UEFA Europa League. Stumbras were the defending champions.

== Participants ==
Participation in the competition is mandatory for all clubs of the first three tiers (A Lyga, LFF I Lyga and II Lyga). Despite that NFA aren't competing for the second year in a row. Teams of lower divisions are eligible to join if they met additional criterios. Rules prevented all reserve teams from entering the cup.

A Lyga	LFF I Lyga	II Lyga	III Lyga	IV Lyga
Stumbras (holders); Žalgiris; Sūduva; Trakai; Jonava; Atlantas; Kauno Žalgiris; Palanga	Banga; Vilniaus Vytis; DFK Dainava; Džiugas; Koralas; Nevėžis; Pakruojis; Panevėžys; Utenis; Kupiškis	South Zone: Ateitis; BFA; Hegelmann Litauen; Panerys; Šilas; Sveikata; TERA; Viltis; West Zone: Gargždų Pramogos SC; Šilutė; Širvėna; FA Šiauliai; Babrungas; Minija; Atmosfera Mažeikiai; Akmenės Cementas; Saned	Alytus County: Merkys; Kaunas County: Kėdainiai; Klaipėda County: Sakuona-Rugpienių kaimas; Marijampolė County: Švyturys; Šiauliai County: Saulininkas-OBLT; ŠSPC Radviliškis; Adiada; Vilnius County: Elektrėnų Versmė; Navigatoriai; VGTU Vilkai; Kaišiadorys-Baltai	A Division: Geležinis Vilkas; B Division: Top Kickers

== Schedule ==
The rounds of the 2016–17 competition were scheduled as follows:

Round	Draw date and time	New entries	Clubs	Date(s)	Goals / games
First Round	20 April, 13:00	40	40 → 24	27 April – 1 May	/ 16
Round of 32		8	32 → 16	24–27 May	/ 16
Round of 16		none	16 → 8	23 June – 1 July	/ 8
Quarter-finals		none	8 → 4	1–2 September	/ 4
Semi-finals		none	4 → 2	15–16 September	/ 2
Final		none	2 → 1	30 September	1 / 1

== Matches ==
=== First round ===
The following pairs were drawn on 20 April 2017 by Lithuania national team midfielder Saulius Mikoliūnas. Dates and venues will be confirmed after the draw.

Nevėžis, Pakruojis (I Lyga), Babrungas, Hegelmann Litauen, Gargždų Pramogos SC, Saned (II Lyga), Elektrėnų Versmė (III Lyga) and Top Kickers (IV Lyga) received free passes to the next round.

25 April 2018	Akmenės Cementas (3)	3–6	FA Šiauliai (3)	Mažeikiai
20:00	Klaudijus 14' Lukošius 68' Griškevičius 75'	Report	Kęstutis 12' (o.g.) Vytautas 51', 58' Petravičius 60' Gerulskis 78', 88'	Stadium: Mažeikių miesto centrinis stadionas Referee: Mindaugas Jackus

27 April 2018	Merkys (4)	0–7	DFK Dainava (2)	Alytus
18:30		Report	Zaitsev 1' Vásquez 16', 18' (pen.) Vítor Hugo 59' Rocys 76' Paulėkas 81', 83'	Stadium: AAFF dirbtinės dangos aikštė Referee: Arūnas Dapkus

27 April 2018	Banga (2)	0–0 (4–3 p)	Džiugas (2)	Gargždai
19:00				Stadium: Gargždai Stadium; Referee: Mindaugas Jackus

27 April 2018	Panerys (3)	4–1	Koralas (2)	Vilnius
20:00	Bielickas 30'; Beniušis 31', 84'; Meškinis 90' (pen.)		Marcinkevičius 9'	Stadium: Vilniaus Senvagės gimnazijos stadionas Referee: Robertas Valikonis

27 April 2018	Geležinis Vilkas (5)	0–8	Sveikata (3)	Vilnius
20:10			Kalimavičius ?', ?'; Karpavičius ?', ?'; Pečiulis ?'; Vaišnys ?'; Kereiša ?'; Ryckis ?'	Stadium: Fanų Stadionas; Referee: Donatas Šimėnas

28 April 2018	Šilas (3)	4–3	Ateitis (3)	Kazlų Rūda
12:00	Brokas 16', 35'; Kazelis 24'; Urba 32'		Tijūnėlis 28'; Gudaitis 41'; Dromantas 73' (pen.)	Stadium: Kazlų Rūdos miesto stadionas Referee: Arūnas Dapkus

VGTU Vilkai (4)	v	Viltis (3)

Atmosfera Mažeikiai (3)	v	Panevėžys (2)

Adiada (4)	v	Minija (3)

Švyturys (4)	v	Kupiškis (2)

Kėdainiai (4)	v	Šilutė (3)

ŠSPC Radviliškis (4)	v	Utenis (2)

Kaišiadorys-Baltai (4)	v	Saulininkas-OBLT (4)

Širvėna (4)	v	Vilniaus Vytis (2)

****************** (4)	v	TERA (3)

Sakuona-Rugpienių kaimas (4)	v	BFA (3)

=== Round of 32 ===
24 May 2018	v

v

v

v

v

v

v

v

v

v

v

v

v

FA Šiauliai	0-7	FK Sūduva
		⚽ 27` Bruno De Araujo Dybal ⚽ 33` Alassane N'Diaye ⚽ 34` Rigino Ruben Cicilia ⚽ 60` Karolis Laukžemis ⚽ 71` Karolis Laukžemis ⚽ 83` Darius Isoda ⚽ 87` Karolis Laukžemis

27 May 2018	FK Panevėžys	0-0; 3:4 (Pn)	FK Palanga	Panevėžys
18:00		Report		Stadium: Panevėžio "Aukštaitijos" stadionas Attendance: 200; Referee: Orestas Abramavičius

26 May 2018	FK Babrungas Plungė	5–3	FK Sveikata Kybartai	Plungė
16:00	Tomas Birškys 12'; Edvinas Alimas 33'; Tomas Birškys 62'; Martynas Turskis 90'; Tomas Birškys 90+3'	Report	Aurelijus Barusas 51' (į savus vartus); 69' Karolis Kereiša; 71' (11m) Povilas Kalimavičius<	Stadium: Plungės stadionas Attendance: 120; Referee: Šarūnas Tamulynas

=== Round of 16 ===
23 June 2018.	Trakai (1)	0–3	Suduva (1)
		Report

23 June 2018.	Kupiskis (2)	1–7	FK Kauno Žalgiris (1)
		Report

24 June 2018.	Nevezis (2)	0–4	Palanga (1)
		Report

30 June 2018.	Atlantas (1)	1–3	Stumbras (1)
		Report

30 June 2018.	Banga (2)	1–0	Pakruojis (2)
		Report

1 July 2018.	Jonava (1)	0–5	Zalgiris (1)
13:00		Report

1 July 2018.	Babrungas (3)	2–3	Viltis (3)
13:00		Report

1 July 2018.	Elektrenu Versme (3)	0–10	DFK Dainava Alytus (2)
13:00		Report

=== Quarter-finals ===
2 September 2018	FK Kauno Žalgiris	2 : 0	Palanga	S. Dariaus ir S. Girėno stadionas, (Kaunas)
19:30	Arūnas Klimavičius 5'; Joao Vitor Brandao Figueiredo 90+1'; Ilya Kalpachuk (red card) 90+3'	report		Attendance: 180; Referee: Mantas Pomeckis

2 August 2018	Sūduva	1 : 4	Žalgiris	"Arvi" arena, (Marijampolė)
13:00	Giedrius Matulevičius 72'	report	11' (pen.) Liviu Antal; 32' Ugochukwu Louis Ogana; 62' Ugochukwu Louis Ogana; 70' Liviu Antal	Attendance: 1 700; Referee: Manfredas Lukjančukas

31 August 2018	Banga	1 : 2	DFK Dainava	Gargždų stadionas, (Gargždai)
19:00	Valdas Pocevičius 61' (pen.)	Report	23' Sebastian Vasquez Gamboa; 44' Sebastian Vasquez Gamboa	Attendance: 300; Referee: Edmundas Gaigalas

1 September 2018	Viltis	0 : 3	Stumbras	LFF stadionas, (Vilnius)
13:00		Report	31' (pen.) Rimvydas Sadauskas; 37' Bah Alseny; 82' Levan Matcharashvili	Attendance: 300; Referee: Vilius Paulauskas

=== Semi-finals ===
16 September 2018	DFK Dainava (II)	0–4	FC Stumbras (I)	Alytus
13:00		Report	37' Lucas Villela Rezende; 72' Levan Matcharashvili; 75' Marcos Soares Elias Junior; 84' Nasro Mohamed Akcem Bouchareb	Stadium: Alytaus stadionas Attendance: 1,500; Referee: Vijūnas Vasiliauskas

15 September 2018	FK Kauno Žalgiris (I)	0–3	FK Žalgiris Vilnius (I)	Kaunas
13:00		Report	Liviu Antal; Tomaš Malec; Liviu Antal	Stadium: S. Dariaus ir S. Girėno stadionas Attendance: 400; Referee: Darius Petraška

=== Final ===
The final match was played on Sunday 30 September 2018.

30 September 2018
13:00
FINAL

FC Stumbras	0–3	FK Žalgiris
	Report; Report	34' Tomáš Šimkovič; 43' Marko Tomić; 88' Marquinhos Carioca

Alytus stadium, Alytus
Attendance: 1 782
Referee: Jurij Paškovskij

"Stumbras"	"Žalgiris"

== See also ==
Leagues

- 2018 A Lyga
- 2018 LFF I Lyga

Cups

- 2018 Lithuanian Supercup
