= 2017 LFF I Lyga =

I Lyga
- Season: 2017
- Champions: Palanga
- Promoted: Palanga
- Relegated: Tauras; Žalgiris B Utenis B
- Matches: 210
- Goals: 676 (3.22 per match)
- Top goalscorer: Gvidas Juška (17 goals)
- Biggest home win: Šilutė 7–0 Utenis B (30 May 2017); Žalgiris B 7–0 Šilutė (18 October 2017)
- Biggest away win: Utenis B 2–11 DFK Dainava (20 May 2017)
- Highest scoring: Utenis B 2–11 DFK Dainava (20 May 2017)
- Longest winning run: 6 games Koralas
- Longest unbeaten run: 11 games Džiugas; Koralas; Banga
- Longest winless run: 13 games Stumbras B
- Longest losing run: 11 games Utenis B
- Highest attendance: 1,000; Banga v Palanga (3 September 2017)
- Lowest attendance: 10; Utenis B v Trakai B (1 July 2017)
- Attendance: 41,302 (197 per match)
- All statistics correct as of 22 October 2017.

The 2017 LFF I Lyga is the 28th season of the I Lyga, the second tier association football league of Lithuania. The season began on 24 March 2017 and is scheduled to end on 5 November 2017.

== Teams ==
Locations of the 2017 LFF I Lyga teams
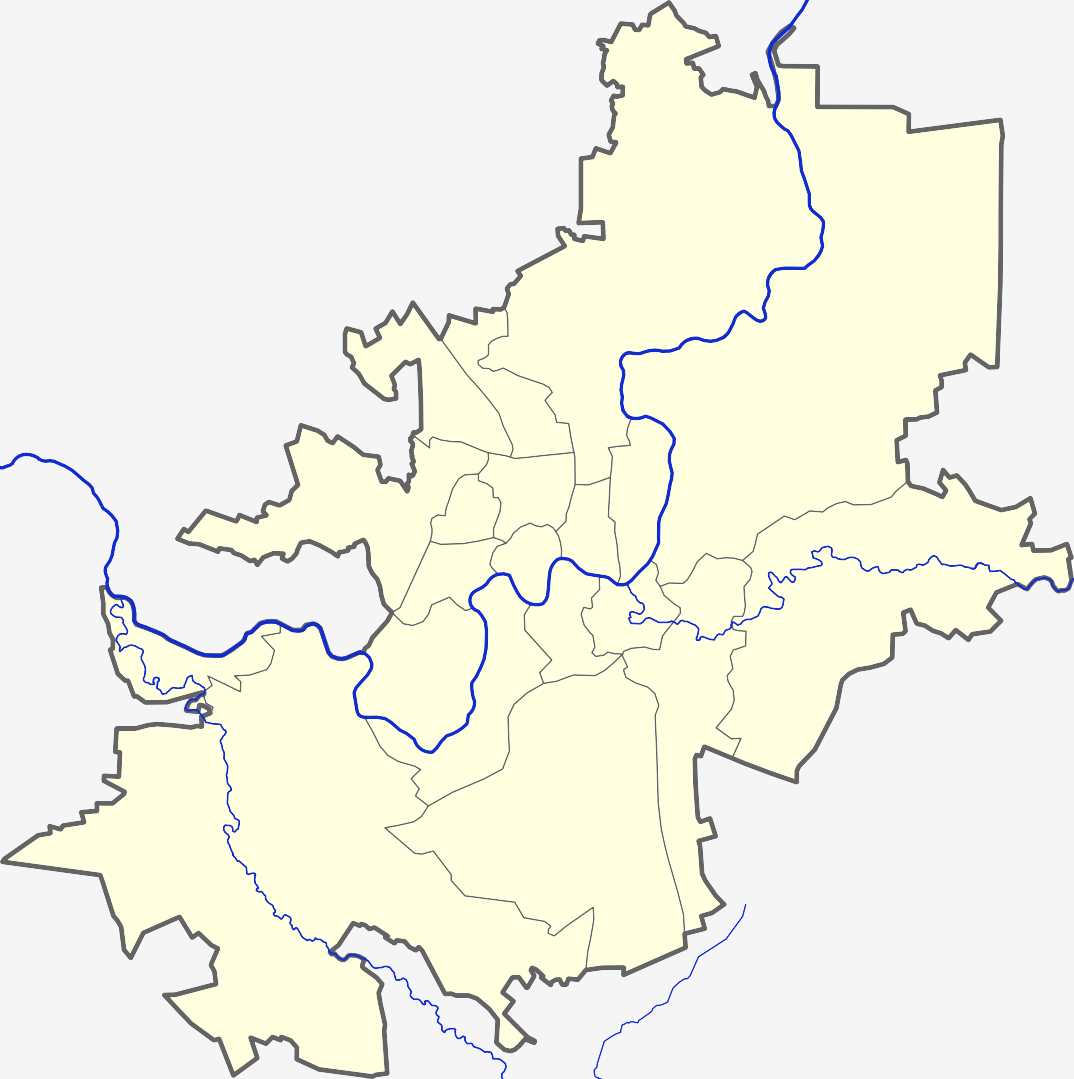
Vilnius teams

=== Changes from last season ===
A total of fifteen clubs were confirmed for the season, a decrease of one spot compared to the last year sixteen. Four of them are reserve teams of the A Lyga sides - one more than last season and absolute maximum allowed for the competitions.

No teams were relegated from the top tier, due to last year I Lyga winners Šilas owner decision to relegate his club into the II Lyga after an investigation of match-fixing during a pre-season tournament was started (and later completed).

Three teams were automatically promoted from the II Lyga – West zone winners Pakruojis, South zone winners Stumbras B and East zone winners Utenis B, while II Lyga West zone silver medalists Koralas have received a special permission to compete in the league, after meeting all licensing criterios. Such permission was also given for Tauras, who were recreated after one season of complete inactivity in any football related activity.

Promoted from 2016 II Lyga	Recreated	Relegated to 2017 II Lyga	Relegated to 2017 III Lyga	Other
Pakruojis; Koralas; Utenis B Stumbras B	Tauras	Šilas; Kauno Žalgiris B	Kražantė	Lokomotyvas – Moved to futsal A Lyga; F.B.K. Kaunas – Ceased operations Minija – Ceased operations

=== Stadiums, personnel and sponsorship ===
Team	Head coach	Captain	Kitmaker	Sponsor	Stadium	Capacity
Banga	(Lithuania) Tomas Tamošauskas	(Lithuania) Karolis Urbaitis	Nike	Litana, Neogroup	Gargždai Stadium, Gargždai	2,323
DFK Dainava	(Lithuania) Darius Gvildys	(Lithuania) Linas Savastas	Adidas	Dzūkijos Mediena, Dzūkų užeiga	Alytus Stadium, Alytus	3,748
Džiugas	(Lithuania) Vijūnas Vasiliauskas	(Lithuania) Andrius Lipskis	Joma	TonyBet	Telšiai Central Stadium, Telšiai	2,400
Koralas	(Lithuania) Saulius Mikalajūnas (Lithuania) Kęstutis Ivaškevičius	(Lithuania) Marius Stonkus	Jako	Transkela	Klaipėda Artificial Football Pitch, Klaipėda	1,000
Nevėžis		(Lithuania) Nerijus Kestenis	Hummel	Daumantų	Kėdainiai Stadium, Kėdainiai	3,000
Pakruojis	(Lithuania) Aidas Dambrauskas	(Lithuania) Aivaras Bagočius	Joma	Dolomitas	Pakruojis Stadium, Pakruojis	2,000
Palanga	(Lithuania) Valdas Trakys	(Lithuania) Gvidas Juška	Jako	—	Palanga Stadium, Palanga	1,212
Panevėžys	(Lithuania) Albertas Klimavičius	(Lithuania) Mantas Savėnas	Adidas	Kalnapilis	Aukštaitija Stadium, Panevėžys	4,000
Stumbras B	(Portugal) João Martins	(Lithuania) Vytautas Žemaitis	Hummel	Ibumetin	NFA Stadium, Kaunas	500
Šilutė	(Lithuania) Svajūnas Česnulis	(Lithuania) Edgaras Lukoševičius	Hummel	—	Šilutė Stadium, Šilutė	3,000
Tauras	(Lithuania) Darius Stažys	(Lithuania) Lukas Ankudinovas	Givova	—	Vytautas Stadium, Tauragė	3,200
Trakai B	(Lithuania) Gintaras Rimkus	(Lithuania) Andrius Kazakevičius	Nike	Ecoil	Trakai Stadium, Trakai	200
Utenis B	(Lithuania) Egidijus Varnas	(Lithuania) Deividas Maciulevičius (Lithuania) Mindaugas Ubeika	Adidas	Baltijos polistirenas, Flavorina	Utenis Stadium, Utena	3,073
Vilniaus Vytis	(Lithuania) Algimantas Liubinskas	(Lithuania) Haroldas Šidlauskas	Adidas	Forgiven	LFF Stadium, Vilnius	5,067
Žalgiris B	(Lithuania) Vaidas Sabaliauskas	(Lithuania) Lukas Vaičiūnas	Nike	TOP Sport	Senvagė Stadium, Vilnius	500

== League table ==
Pos	Team	Pld	W	D	L	GF	GA	GD	Pts	
1	Palanga (C, P)	28	19	4	5	64	36	+28	61	Promotion to A Lyga
2	Banga	28	18	5	5	58	26	+32	59	Qualification to Promotion play-offs
3	Vilniaus Vytis	28	16	6	6	51	28	+23	54	
4	DFK Dainava	28	15	7	6	57	27	+30	52	
5	Džiugas	28	14	8	6	56	35	+21	50	
6	Koralas	28	14	4	10	50	43	+7	46	
7	Nevėžis	28	13	6	9	41	28	+13	45	
8	Stumbras B	28	11	6	11	46	30	+16	39	Ineligible for promotion
9	Pakruojis	28	11	6	11	40	46	−6	39	
10	Panevėžys	28	10	7	11	45	44	+1	37	
11	Trakai B	28	10	3	15	37	44	−7	33	Ineligible for promotion
12	Šilutė (Note: Šilutė finished season in relegation zone, but as three of the II Lyga top finishers decided to withdraw from the licensing process club were allowed to stay in the league for next season. Still Šilutė decided to withdraw to the 2018 II Lyga West zone due to club's inability to collect a competitive squad.) (D, T)	28	7	6	15	36	63	−27	27	Relegation to II Lyga
13	Tauras (Note: Tauras finished season in relegation zone, but as three of the II Lyga top finishers decided to withdraw from the licensing process club were allowed to stay in the league for next season. Regardless club weren't able to seek a license for next season after losing its chairman and decided to cease operations.) (D, T)	28	6	4	18	34	60	−26	22	Relegation to II Lyga
14	Žalgiris B (Note: Žalgiris B finished season in relegation zone, but as three of the II Lyga top finishers decided to withdraw from the licensing process club were allowed to stay in the league for next season.) (T)	28	5	3	20	39	65	−26	18	
15	Utenis B (R)	28	3	1	24	22	101	−79	10	Relegation to II Lyga

Source: Pirma Lyga
Rules for classification: 1) Points; 2) Head-to-head points; 3) Head-to-head goal difference; 4) Head-to-head goals scored; 5) Head-to-head matches won; 6) Goal difference; 7) Goals scored; 8) Matches won.
(C) Champions; (D) Disqualified; (P) Promoted; (R) Relegated; (T) Qualified, but not yet for the particular phase indicated

== Results ==
Home \ Away	BAN	DAI	DŽI	KOR	NEV	PAK	PAL	PAN	STB	ŠLT	TAU	TRB	UTB	VYT	ŽLB
Banga	—	2–1	2–0	2–0	2–1	5–0	2–2	6–4	1–0	1–1	3–2	2–0	5–0	0–2	5–1
DFK Dainava	0–0	—	1–0	0–1	0–1	3–0	3–1	2–1	1–3	2–2	5–0	2–1	5–0	2–1	2–0
Džiugas	1–1	1–1	—	1–0	1–4	2–2	3–0	2–5	0–0	5–1	0–0	1–0	1–0	0–0	3–3
Koralas	3–1	0–1	2–6	—	2–0	3–1	0–3	2–1	0–4	4–0	4–0	0–1	3–1	1–3	5–3
Nevėžis	0–1	2–2	1–2	3–2	—	0–1	0–3	0–0	1–0	1–1	2–0	2–0	4–1	0–0	3–1
Pakruojis	2–1	1–0	1–2	4–1	1–0	—	1–1	2–1	3–1	2–2	3–0	1–2	5–0	2–2	0–4
Palanga	1–0	0–2	2–2	1–2	1–1	3–1	—	1–0	2–1	4–0	6–1	3–1	2–1	2–1	3–1
Panevėžys	0–1	1–2	0–2	1–1	1–3	1–0	3–4	—	1–1	2–1	2–0	2–1	1–0	1–1	2–1
Stumbras B	2–1	0–1	2–1	3–3	1–1	3–0	2–1	1–1	—	2–0	2–2	0–2	1–0	0–1	5–0
Šilutė	1–5	1–1	1–3	0–1	2–0	2–0	2–3	2–2	2–1	—	2–0	1–0	7–0	0–5	2–1
Tauras	1–2	2–2	2–3	0–3	0–1	0–0	2–3	1–2	0–4	2–1	—	3–0	3–0	0–1	5–1
Trakai B	1–1	1–3	0–4	1–1	0–2	3–1	1–3	1–2	2–1	2–0	3–1	—	3–1	1–1	5–0
Utenis B	0–4	2–11	0–5	0–3	0–4	3–3	1–3	0–4	1–6	2–1	2–5	4–3	—	1–2	1–0
Vilniaus Vytis	0–1	2–1	4–3	1–1	2–1	1–2	1–2	4–2	1–0	5–1	2–0	1–0	4–0	—	3–0
Žalgiris B	0–1	1–1	0–2	1–2	1–3	0–1	1–4	2–2	1–0	7–0	1–2	1–2	3–1	4–0	—

Source: I Lyga (in Lithuanian), LFF (in Lithuanian)
Legend: Blue = home team win; Yellow = draw; Red = away team win.

== Attendance ==
=== Average home attendances ===
Pos	Team	Total	High	Low	Average	Change
1	Banga	7,220	1,000	300	516	−2.8%
2	DFK Dainava	5,782	680	250	413	+7.6%
3	Džiugas	4,530	450	200	324	+6.2%
4	Panevėžys	4,090	500	130	293	−29.9%
5	Palanga	2,950	300	150	211	+20.6%
6	Tauras	2,684	400	64	192	n/a
7	Nevėžis	2,295	300	90	164	−16.8%
8	Vilniaus Vytis	1,985	300	70	142	−32.7%
9	Pakruojis	1,885	300	15	135	n/a
10	Koralas	1,808	300	50	130	n/a
11	Šilutė	1,420	200	50	102	+13.3%
12	Stumbras B	1,416	250	50	102	n/a
13	Žalgiris B	1,228	150	30	88	−15.4%
14	Utenis B	1,033	130	10	74	n/a
15	Trakai B	976	150	20	70	+18.6%
	League total	41,302	1,000	10	197	−3.4%

Updated to games played on 22 October 2017
Source: I Lyga, LFF

=== Highest attendances ===
Rank	Round	Home team	Score	Away team	Attendance	Date	Stadium
1	23	Banga	2–2	Palanga	1,000	3 September 2017	Gargždai Stadium
2	26	Banga	2–0	Koralas	800	22 September 2017	Gargždai Stadium
3	12	DFK Dainava	2–1	Vilniaus Vytis	680	16 June 2017	Alytus Stadium
4	7	DFK Dainava	3–0	Pakruojis	652	12 May 2017	Alytus Stadium
5	20	Banga	2–0	Džiugas	600	11 August 2017	Gargždai Stadium
