= 2019 Lithuanian Football Cup =

SHARP LFF Taurė

Tournament details
- Country: Lithuania
- Dates: 26 April – 29 September
- Teams: 62

Final positions
- Champions: FK Sūduva Marijampolė
- Runners-up: FK Banga Gargždai

Tournament statistics
- Matches played: 61
- Goals scored: 235 (3.85 per match)

2019 Lithuanian Football Cup, SHARP LFF Cup was the 31st independent Lithuania and the 74th overall national football cup tournament.

The tournament started on 26 April 2019, and the final took place on 29 September 2019.

The competition format is a single-elimination tournament, all ties are contested in a single match.

The cup winners qualify for the 2020–21 UEFA Europa League. The defending champions were FK Žalgiris.

== Participants ==
Participation in the competition is mandatory for all clubs of the top three tiers (A Lyga, LFF I Lyga, LFF II Lyga). Teams of lower divisions are eligible to apply for participation if they meet licensing criteria. The reserve teams are not allowed to participate in the cup competition.

The application submission deadline was the 5 April 2019. The deadline was extended to 15 April due to increased interest in the competition from the lower divisions, which are getting refereeing costs paid by the LFF this year.

A total of 62 teams enrolled to the competition, the match draw took place on 18 April 2019. During the draw the organizers realized that technical errors were made, and subsequently the draw results were annulled. Repeat draw was held the next day. The organizers were also criticized for inappropriate representational format.

A lyga
FK Atlantas
FK Kauno Žalgiris
FK Palanga
FK Panevėžys
FK Riteriai
FC Stumbras
FK Sūduva Marijampolė
FK Žalgiris

I lyga
FK Jonava
DFK Dainava Alytus
FK Banga Gargždai
FK Nevėžis Kėdainiai
FC Džiugas Telšiai
Vilniaus Vytis
FC Pakruojis
FC Kupiškis
FC Hegelmann Litauen Kaunas
FK Minija (2017) Kretinga
FK Atmosfera (2012) Mažeikiai
FA Šiauliai
FK Vilnius (2019)

II lyga
Naujosios Akmenės „Akmenės cementas“
Kelmės futbolo klubas
FK Babrungas Plungė
FK Šilutė
SANED Joniškis
Radviliškio SC
FK Utenis Utena
FK Šilas Kazlų Rūda
Marijampolė City
Sveikata Kybartai
FK TERA Vilnius
FK Viltis Vilnius
FM Ateitis Vilnius
FK Vidzgiris Alytus
FK Aukštaitija Panevėžys

III lyga
Vilniaus RFS
Vilniaus „Granitas“
Vilniaus „VGTU-Vilkai“
Vilniaus „Navigatoriai“
„Elektrėnų versmė“
Kaišiadorių „Baltai“
Ukmergės „Spartakas“
Kauno AFF
„Prienai“
„Kazlų Rūda“
„Kėdainiai“
Klaipėdos AFF
Klaipėdos „Sendvaris“
Marijampolės AFF
Marijampolės „Švyturys“
Šiaulių AFF
Kuršėnų „Venta“
Šiaulių „Saulininkas“
Šiaulių „Adiada
Panevėžio AFF
„Anykščiai“

IV lyga
Vilniaus RFS
Vilniaus „Ave.Co“
Vilniaus „Salininkai“
Vilniaus „Geležinis vilkas“
Vilniaus „Futboliukas“
Vilniaus „Futbolo Broliai“
Vilniaus „Top Kickers“
Vilniaus „Vova“
Vilniaus „Viesulas“
Vilniaus „Reaktyvas“
Vilniaus „Vieni vartai“
„Lentvaris“

== Major events ==
The draw attracted media attention first by unusual draw method, featuring skimpy dressed girl in a wind tunnel, catching paper strips with team names, and later by realizing that technical errors were made in team names and number of teams in the draw. The draw was abandoned and held again the next day, in a traditional ball-in-a-bowl manner.

As FC Stumbras club collapsed in June, the win in the 1/8 final tie was awarded to FK Žalgiris.

Both the police and the Lithuanian Football Federation have opened the investigations on match fixing in the semi-final match between FK Banga Gargždai and FK Palanga. Suspicious betting activity was reported by the local and the international betting companies.

== Matches and Results ==
=== Match Calendar ===
Date	Round
26 April 2019 - 1 May 2019	Preliminary Round I & II
24–28 May 2019	1/16 final matches
18–19, 25–26 June 2019	1/8 final matches
27–28 August 2019	Quarterfinals
17–18 September 2019	Semifinals
29 September 2019	Final

=== Preliminary Round I ===
The league that team represents is shown in brackets.

22 April 2019	Adiada Šiauliai (III)	1:3	FK Sendvaris (III)	Šiauliai
15:00	Justinas Pučinskis 63'		Karolis Tendys 29'; Tadas Jurkus 60'; Tadas Jurkus 86'	Stadium: Gytarių stadionas Attendance: 25; Referee: Dainius Raudys

22 April 2019	FK Vieni Vartai Vilnius (IV)	4:2 (a.e.t.)	FK Lentvaris (IV)	Vilnius
21:30				Stadium: Fanų stadionas Referee: Kęstutis Bartuškevičius

24 April 2019	FK Granitas Vilnius (III)	0:3	FSK Anykščiai (III)	Vilnius
21:30				Stadium: Fanų stadionas Referee: Vilius Paulauskas

25 April 2019	FK Venta Kuršėnai (III)	0:3	SC Baltai Kaišiadorys (III)	Šiaulių rajonas
19:00			Saulius Jankauskas 12'; Tautvydas Valkavičius 58'; Aivaras Klinkevičius 78'	Stadium: Kuršėnų SM stadionas Attendance: 50; Referee: Mindaugas Jackus

25 April 2019	FK Top Kickers Vilnius (IV)	3:4	FKK Spartakas Ukmergė (III)	Vilniaus rajonas
20:00				Stadium: Širvintų stadionas Referee: Artiom Gutovskij

26 April 2019	FK Rūdupis Prienai (III)	2:0	SK Saulininkas Šiauliai (III)	Prienai
19:30	Donatas Bendinskas 1'; Mantas Karčiauskas 12'			Stadium: Prienų sporto ir pramogų arena Attendance: 80; Referee: Ugnius Veprauskas

=== Preliminary Round II ===
24 April 2019	„Kėdainiai“ (III)	3:3 (9:8 p)	Mažeikių „Atmosfera“ (I)	Kėdainiai
19:30	Lukas Berednikovas 31'; Lukas Berednikovas 68'; Lukas Berednikovas 76'		Gintas Skrodenis 18'; Gvidas Gineitis 43' (pen.); Klaudijus Kvedaras 83'	Stadium: Kėdainių stadionas Attendance: 60; Referee: Ugnius Veprauskas

26 April 2019	Vilniaus „Vieni vartai“ (IV)	1:5	Kėdainių „Nevėžis“ (I)	Vilnius
19:00			E.Kugys; E.Kugys; J.Supronas; J.Supronas; O.Dovhyi	Stadium: LFF stadionas Attendance: 50; Referee: Gediminas Macevičius

26 April 2019	Vilniaus „Vova“ (IV)	2:6	Panevėžio „Aukštaitija“ (II)	Vilnius
18:00				Stadium: Vilniaus Senvagės gimnazijos stadionas Referee: Donatas Šimėnas

27 April 2019	Širvintų „VGTU-Vilkai“ (IV)	1:4	Plungės „Babrungas“ (II)	Vilniaus rajonas
14:00				Stadium: Širvintų stadionas Attendance: 55; Referee: Gediminas Macevičius

27 April 2019	Marijampolės „Švyturys“ (III)	1:1 (4:5 p)	FA „Šiauliai“ (I)	Marijampolė
16:00	Andrius Urbšys 16'		Donatas Konikas 65'	Stadium: Sūduvos stadionas Attendance: 57; Referee: Arūnas Dapkus

27 April 2019	„Elektrėnų versmė“ (III)	1:2	Gargždų „Banga“ (I)	Vilnius
16:00	Julius Dranginis 35' (pen.)		Darius Zubauskas 2'; Edvinas Bračkus 69'	Stadium: Fanų stadionas Attendance: 50; Referee: Julius Butkus

27 April 2019	Vilniaus „Navigatoriai“ (III)	5:0	„Šilutė“ (II)	Vilnius
17:00				Stadium: Vilniaus Senvagės gimnazijos stadionas Referee: Artiom Gutovskij

28 April 2019	Vilniaus „Salininkai“ (IV)	1:3	„Vilniaus Vytis“ (I)	Vilnius
14:00	13'		7'; 62'; 87'	Stadium: Fanų stadionas Referee: Jurij Paškovskij

28 April 2019	Vilniaus „Reaktyvas“ (IV)	0:6	Vilniaus „Tera (II)	Vilnius
17:30				Stadium: Žalgirio bazės stadionas Referee: Robertas Valikonis

28 April 2019	Akmenės „Akmenės cementas“ (II)	1:2	„Pakruojis“ (I)	Mažeikiai
18:30	Justinas Kuizinas 90+1'		Lukas Drasutis 12' (o.g.); Ronaldas Misiūnas 84'	Stadium: Mažeikių sporto kompleksas Attendance: 60; Referee: Vijūnas Vasiliauskas

28 April 2019	Utenos „Utenis“ (II)	1:8	„Kupiškis“ (I)	Panevėžys
19:00	Gabrielius Jacintas Petuchovas 10'		Mindaugas Butkus 7'; Mindaugas Butkus 34'; Mindaugas Butkus 44'; Edgaras Stankevičius 48'; Yudai Koike 63'; Aleksandrs Kļimovs 65'; Vladislavs Grigjans 77'; Yudai Koike 80'	Stadium: Panevėžio Žemynos progimnazijos stadionas Attendance: 50; Referee: Darius Petraška

29 April 2019	Vilniaus „Ateitis“ (II)	2:1	FK „Vilnius“ (I)	Vilnius
20:15	Matas Gudaitis 37'; Kaede Hirose 45'		Lukas Juodkunaitis 57'	Stadium: LFF stadionas Attendance: 250; Referee: Jurij Paškovskij

30 April 2019	Kaišiadorių „Baltai“ (III)	3:2	„Kelmės futbolo klubas“ (II)	Kaišiadorių rajonas
19:00	Mindaugas Žigutis 11' (pen.); Aivaras Klinkevičius 17'; Aivaras Klinkevičius 89'		Deividas Kumeta 35'; Rimvydas Balčiūnas 73'	Stadium: Žiežmarių stadionas Attendance: 42; Referee: Kęstutis Bartuškevičius

30 April 2019	„Kazlų Rūda“ (III)	1:3	„Radviliškis“ (II)	Kazlų Rūda
19:15	6'		23'; 51'; 82'	Stadium: Kazlų Rūdos miesto stadionas Referee: Aurimas Strolė

30 April 2019	„Marijampolė City“ (II)	3:0 (no show)	Joniškio „Saned“ (II)	Marijampolė
19:15				Stadium: Sūduvos stadionas Referee: Arūnas Dapkus
Note: the win awarded to „Marijampolė City“ (II) as the opponent did not arrive to the match

1 May 2019	„Prienai“ (III)	0:5	Kretingos „Minija“ (I)	Prienai
12:00			Lukas Jakumas 2'; Žilvinas Bajoras 17' (o.g.); Yaya Barry 41'; Assylbek Seitkaliyev 44'; Mindaugas Grušauskas 83'	Stadium: Prienų sporto ir pramogų arena Attendance: 40; Referee: Kęstutis Bartuškevičius

1 May 2019	Vilniaus „Ave.Ko.“ (IV)	1:1 (3:4 p)	Alytaus „Dainava“ (I)	Vilnius
12:30				Stadium: Fanų stadionas Attendance: 100; Referee: Gediminas Macevičius

1 May 2019	„Anykščiai“ (III)	0:7	Kazlų Rūdos „Šilas“ (II)	Kazlų Rūda
13:00			Karolis Raškauskas 7'; Renaldas Stankevičius 13'; Modestas Atmanavičius 30'; Modestas Atmanavičius 59'; Renaldas Stankevičius 68'; Robertas Barzdukas 72'; Audrius Račkus 76'	Stadium: Kazlų Rūdos miesto stadionas Attendance: 68; Referee: Arūnas Dapkus

1 May 2019	Ukmergės „Spartakas“ (III)	4:1	Klaipėdos „Sendvaris“ (III)	Ukmergė
14:00				Stadium: Ukmergės miesto stadionas Attendance: 18; Referee: Dainius Bisigirskas

1 May 2019	Vilniaus „Geležinis vilkas“ (IV)	1:0	Vilniaus „Viesulas“ (IV)	Vilnius
17:45				Stadium: Lietuvos Kariuomenės Lietuvos Didžiojo Kunigaikščio Gedimino Štabo Bataliono Stadionas

1 May 2019	Alytaus „Vidzgiris“ (II)	0:2	Vilniaus „Viltis“ (II)	Alytus
18:00			Denis Romanov 10'; Tomas Chomičius 12'	Stadium: Alytaus stadionas Attendance: 97; Referee: Rolandas Adžgauskas

1 May 2019	Kauno „Hegelmann Litauen“ (I)	3:1	„Jonava“ (I)	Kaunas
20:00	Mantas Rusys 67'; Mantas Rusys 77'; Ramūnas Mačežinskas 90+1'		Šarūnas Činikas 10'	Stadium: NFA stadionas Attendance: 150; Referee: Ugnius Veprauskas

1 May 2019	Vilniaus „Futbolo Broliai“ (IV)	1:4	Kybartų „Sveikata“ (II)	Vilnius
21:15			Rokas Gudelis; Mantas Babušis; Mantas Babušis; Tomas Krakauskas	Stadium: LFF stadionas

1 May 2019	Vilniaus „Futboliukas“ (IV)	2:3	Telšių „Džiugas“ (I)	Vilnius
21:30			Leonardo Antonio; Leonardo Antonio; Vilius Butkus	Stadium: Fanų stadionas Referee: Donatas Šimėnas

130 goals were scored in the 29 matches of the preliminary stage of the competition, averaging at 4.48 goals per match. An average of 72 spectators attended the matches.

=== 1/16 final ===
The 8 teams of the A Lyga have joined the 24 winning teams of Round II. The draw took place on 8 May 2019.

24 May 2019	FC Kupiškis (I)	0:0 (0:3 p)	FK Minija (2017) Kretinga (I)	Kupiškis
18:00				Stadium: Kupiškio stadionas Attendance: 50; Referee: Mindaugas Jackus

24 May 2019	FC Pakruojis (I)	1:3	FK Nevėžis Kėdainiai (I)	Pakruojis
18:30	Artem Fedorov 4'		Aretas Gėgžna 50' 71' 76'	Stadium: Pakruojo stadionas Attendance: 50; Referee: Lukas Jonušis

24 May 2019	Marijampolė City (II)	4:3 (a.e.t.)	DFK Dainava Alytus (I)	Marijampolė
18:30	Artūras Pečiulis 2'; Artūras Pečiulis 23'; Gytis Urba 87' (pen.); Gytis Urba 112' (pen.)		Andrius Kazakevičius 45'; Jose Luis Balanta Caracas 71'; Andrius Kazakevičius 75'; Renatas Banevičius (89' pen.miss)	Stadium: Sūduvos stadionas Attendance: 147; Referee: Arūnas Dapkus

24 May 2019	Sveikata Kybartai (II)	1:0	FK Šilas Kazlų Rūda (II)	Kybartai
19:00	Mantas Babušis 71'			Stadium: Kybartų miesto stadionas Attendance: 150; Referee: Ugnius Veprauskas

24 May 2019	FK Kėdainiai (III)	1:2	FA Šiauliai (I)	Kėdainiai
19:00	Lukas Berednikovas 76'		Vaidas Viktoravičius 55' 68'	Stadium: Kėdainių stadionas Attendance: 45; Referee: Aurimas Strolė

25 May 2019	FK TERA Vilnius (II)	0:2	FK Banga Gargždai (I)	Vilnius
17:00			Šarūnas Skulskis 45'; Deividas Lukošius 78'	Stadium: LEU Stadionas; Attendance: 30; Referee: Vilius Paulauskas

25 May 2019	FK Navigatoriai Vilnius (III)	1:1 (4:5 p)	FC Džiugas Telšiai (I)	Vilnius
19:00	15'		Andrius Lipskis pen'	Stadium: Vilniaus Senvagės gimnazijos stadionas Referee: Dalius Ramanauskas

25 May 2019	Radviliškio SC (II)	1:2	FC Stumbras Kaunas (A)	Radviliškis
19:00	Mantas Martyšovas 45'		Antonio Joao Belo Andrade 5'; Lucas Villela Rezende 37'	Stadium: Radviliškio miesto centrinis stadionas Attendance: 250; Referee: Robertas Valikonis

26 May 2019	FK Kauno Žalgiris (A)	1:1 (5:4 p)	FK Riteriai Vilnius (A)	Kaunas
13:00	Rokas Krušnauskas 52'		Terem Igobor Moffi 55'	Stadium: SM Tauras Stadium; Referee: Edmundas Gaigalas

26 May 2019	FK Aukštaitija Panevėžys (II)	2:3	FK Sūduva Marijampolė (A)	Panevėžys
14:00	Matas Marcinkevičius 42'; Domantas Nebilevičius 90'		Eligijus Jankauskas 25'; Mihret Topcagic 31'; Eligijus Jankauskas 88'	Stadium: Panevėžio Žemynos progimnazijos stadionas Attendance: 246; Referee: Šarūnas Tamulynas

26 May 2019	FK Geležinis Vilkas Vilnius (IV)	0:4	FK Babrungas Plungė (II)	Vilnius
17:00			N.Bumblauskas 21'; T.Birškys 24'; R.Rusys 65'; R. Rusys 77'	Stadium: Lietuvos Kariuomenės Lietuvos Didžiojo Kunigaikščio Gedimino Štabo Bataliono Stadionas; Referee: Kęstutis Bartuškevičius

26 May 2019	FK Atlantas Klaipėda (A)	0:2	FK Žalgiris Vilnius (A)	Klaipėda
17:00			Rolandas Baravykas 87'; Liviu Ion Antal 89'	Stadium: Klaipėdos stadionas Attendance: 100; Referee: Donatas Rumšas

26 May 2019	FK Viltis Vilnius (II)	2:3	Vilniaus Vytis (I)	Vilnius
17:00	Naglis Balčiūnas 58'; Estanislao Guillermo Jameson Moles 85'		Gytis Paulauskas 3'; Otari Kvernadze 29'; Otari Kvernadze 31'	Stadium: LFF stadionas Attendance: 100; Referee: Donatas Šimėnas

26 May 2019	FM Ateitis Vilnius (II)	0:1	FK Palanga (A)	Vilnius
20:00			Andrei Miazin 79'	Stadium: LFF stadionas Attendance: 200; Referee: Jurij Paškovskij

27 May 2019	FC Hegelmann Litauen Kaunas (I)	0:4	FK Panevėžys (A)	Kaunas
19:30			Tadas Eliošius 61'; Tomas Salamanavičius 63'; Tadas Eliošius 64'; Ernestas Veliulis 90'	Stadium: NFA stadionas Attendance: 75; Referee: Gediminas Mažeika

28 May 2019	SC Baltai Kaišiadorys (III)	4:5 (a.e.t.)	FKK Spartakas Ukmergė (III)	Kaišiadorių rajonas
19:15	13'; 23'; 25'; 44'		6'; 14'; 41'; 87'; 118'	Stadium: Žiežmarių stadionas

54 goals were scored in the 16 matches of this stage of the competition, averaging at 3.38 goals per match. An average of 120 spectators attended the matches.

=== 1/8 final ===
The 1/8 final draw took place on 30 May 10:00 EET, with live coverage through LFF YouTube and Facebook channels.

18 June 2019	FKK Spartakas Ukmergė (III)	0:3	FK Banga Gargždai (I)	Ukmergė
19:00			Šarūnas Skulskis 70'; Šarūnas Skulskis 72'; Deividas Lukošius 78'	Stadium: Ukmergės miesto stadionas Attendance: 120; Referee: Vilius Paulauskas

18 June 2019	FK Babrungas Plungė (II)	0:4	FK Palanga (A)	Plungės rajonas
20:00			Andrei Miazin 17' 68' 71' 84'	Stadium: Plungės dirbtinės dangos stadionas Attendance: 200; Referee: Edmundas Gaigalas

19 June 2019	FK Žalgiris Vilnius (A)	+:- (no show)	FC Stumbras Kaunas (A)

19 June 2019	Marijampolė City (II)	1:4	FK Sūduva Marijampolė (A)	Marijampolė
19:00	Deividas Karpavičius 65'		36' Robertas Vėževičius; 73' Vytautas Andriuškevičius; 77' Andro Švrljuga; 84' Mihret Topčagić	Stadium: Sūduvos stadionas Attendance: 2,050; Referee: Saulius Karka

25 June 2019	FK Minija (2017) Kretinga (I)	1:2	FK Kauno Žalgiris (A)	Kretinga
18:00	Soubafolo Youssouf Traore 63'	Report	53' (o.g.) Karolis Inta; 63' Yurii Bushman	Stadium: Kretingos miesto stadionas Attendance: 350; Referee: Vijūnas Vasiliauskas

26 June 2019	FC Džiugas Telšiai (I)	2:1	Vilniaus Vytis (I)	Telšiai
18:00 EEST	Skirmantas Rakauskas 22'; Davydas Arlauskis 36'	Report	62' Gytis Paulauskas	Stadium: Telšių miesto centrinis stadionas Attendance: 450; Referee: Mindaugas Jackus

26 June 2019	Sveikata Kybartai (II)	0:1	FK Nevėžis Kėdainiai (I)	Kybartai
19:00 EEST		Report	86' Deividas Mikalauskas	Stadium: Kybartų miesto stadionas Attendance: 150; Referee: Rolandas Adžgauskas

26 June 2019	FA Šiauliai (I)	1:6 (a.e.t.)	FK Panevėžys (A)	Šiauliai
19:00 EEST	Šarūnas Jurevičius 59' (o.g.)	Report	77' (o.g.) Kristupas Mantinis; 97' Ernestas Veliulis; 99' Sebastián Vásquez Gamboa; 109' Rokas Stanulevičius; 117' Paulius Janušauskas; 119' (pen.) Rafael Ledesma	Stadium: Šiaulių m. centrinis stadionas Attendance: 450; Referee: Šarūnas Tamulynas

=== 1/4 final ===
The quarter final draw took place on 4 July.

27 August 2019	FK Nevėžis Kėdainiai (I)	1:5	FK Žalgiris Vilnius (A)	Kėdainiai
17:30	Nika Toklikišvili 74'		3' Liviu Antal; 50' Tomislav Kiš; 59' Liviu Antal; 70' Karolis Uzėla; 90' Matas Vareika	Stadium: Kėdainių miesto stadionas, DDA aikštė Attendance: 250; Referee: Robertas Šmitas

27 August 2019	FK Banga Gargždai (I)	2:2 (5:4 p)	FK Kauno Žalgiris (A)	Gargždai
	Edvinas Bračkus 66'; Deividas Lukošius 98'		14' Jurijus Bušmanas; 117' Linas Pilibaitis	Stadium: Gargždų stadionas Attendance: 1 000; Referee: Manfredas Lukjančukas

28 August 2019	FC Džiugas Telšiai (I)	1:1 (3:5 p)	FK Palanga (A)	Telšiai
	Andrius Lipskis 35'		14' Andriy Yakovlev	Stadium: Telšių centrinis stadionas Attendance: 350; Referee: Robertas Valikonis

8 September 2019	FK Sūduva Marijampolė (A)	1:0	FK Panevėžys (A)	Marijampolė
18:00	Renan Oliveira 8'			Stadium: Arvi arena (stadionas); Attendance: 950; Referee: Donatas Rumšas

=== 1/2 final ===
The semi final draw took place on 5 September.

17 September 2019	FK Sūduva Marijampolė (A)	4:2 (a.e.t.)	FK Žalgiris Vilnius (A)	Marijampolė
18:30	Semir Kerla 5'; Mihret Topčagić 13' (pen.); Semir Kerla 113'; Michael Blauensteiner 120'	Report	10' Tomislav Kiš; 73' Liviu Antal	Stadium: Arvi arena (stadionas); Attendance: 1 200; Referee: Gediminas Mažeika

18 September 2019	FK Banga Gargždai (I)	2:0	FK Palanga (A)	Gargždai
18:30	Kazimieras Gnedojus 87'; Darius Zubauskas 90+4'	Report		Stadium: Gargždų stadionas Attendance: 700; Referee: Robertas Šmitas

=== Final ===
For the third time in its history FK Sūduva Marijampolė has claimed the cup title.

29 September 2019
18:30

FK Banga Gargždai (I)	0-4	FK Sūduva Marijampolė (A)
	Alyga.lt; Report	Josip Tadić 21'; Renan Oliveira 56'; Mihret Topčagić 89'; Mihret Topčagić 90+2'

Utenis Stadium, Utena
Attendance: 1,837
Referee: Robertas Šmitas (Šilutė)
