= 2018 LFF I Lyga =

I Lyga
- Season: 2018
- Champions: Panevėžys
- Promoted: Panevėžys
- Relegated: Kupiškis
- Matches: 182
- Goals: 658 (3.62 per match)
- Top goalscorer: Evaldas Kugys (20 goals)
- Biggest home win: Panevėžys 10–0 Koralas (8 September 2018)
- Biggest away win: Koralas 0–12 Kupiškis (22 May 2018)
- Highest scoring: Koralas 0–12 Kupiškis (22 May 2018)
- Longest winning run: 6 games Pakruojis; Panevėžys; Džiugas
- Longest unbeaten run: 15 games DFK Dainava
- Longest winless run: 13 games Koralas
- Longest losing run: 13 games Koralas
- Highest attendance: 1,630; DFK Dainava v Kupiškis (20 October 2018)
- Lowest attendance: 20; Koralas v Vilniaus Vytis (18 May 2018); Vilniaus Vytis v NFA (4 August 2018)
- Total attendance: 40,193
- Average attendance: 237
- All statistics correct as of 13 December 2018.

The 2018 LFF I Lyga was the 29th season of the I Lyga, the second tier association football league of Lithuania. The season began on 25 March 2018 and ended on 20 October 2018.

== Teams ==
Locations of the 2017 LFF I Lyga teams
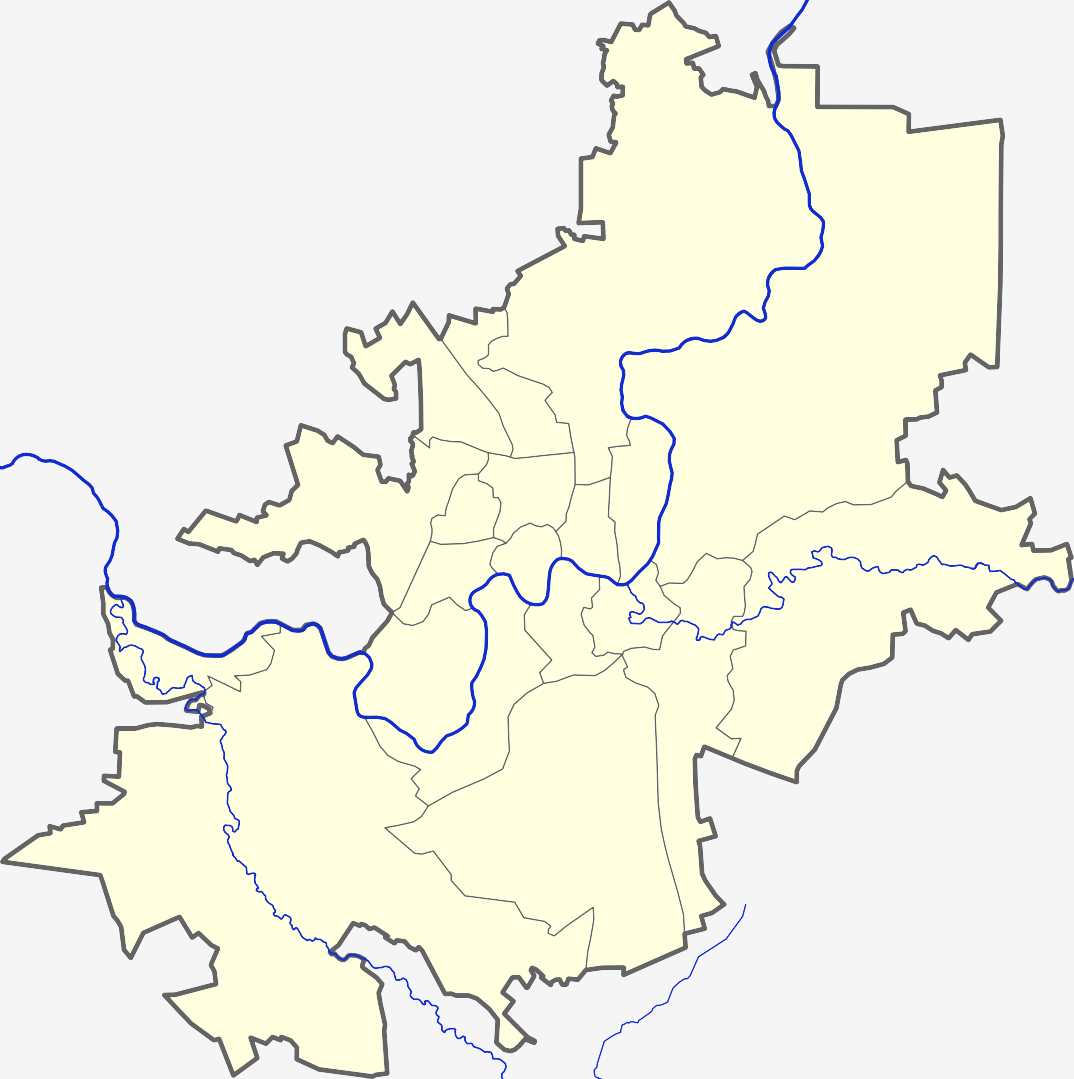
Vilnius teams

=== Changes from last season ===
A total of fifteen clubs were confirmed for the season, same as previous season, but only fourteen competed as Šilutė withdrew 4 days prior to the league's start after an uncompetitive performance in the 2018 Žemaitijos Taurė. Three of them were reserve teams of the A Lyga sides - one less than maximum allowed for the competitions and last season number.

Utenis were relegated from the 2017 A Lyga and replaced last year champions Palanga. Only the II Lyga South Zone winners NFA were automatically promoted from the lower tier as other eligible teams failed to receive licenses. Finally Kupiškis made their debut in the league after a special permission was given by the Lithuanian Football Federation to compete for a newly created team.

Relegated from 2017 A Lyga	Promoted from 2017 II Lyga	Debuting	Promoted to 2018 A Lyga	Relegated to 2018 II Lyga	Other
Utenis	NFA	Kupiškis	Palanga	Šilutė	Tauras – Ceased operations Utenis B – Disbanded

== League table ==
Pos	Team	Pld	W	D	L	GF	GA	GD	Pts	
1	Panevėžys (C, P)	26	18	4	4	77	26	+51	58	Promotion to A Lyga
2	DFK Dainava	26	17	6	3	59	22	+37	57	Qualification to Promotion play-offs
3	Banga	26	18	0	8	51	24	+27	54	
4	Nevėžis	26	16	5	5	63	31	+32	53	
5	Džiugas	26	14	3	9	49	34	+15	45	
6	Vilniaus Vytis	26	13	5	8	67	44	+23	44	
7	Pakruojis	26	13	3	10	44	44	0	42	
8	Utenis	26	12	5	9	46	33	+13	41	
9	Stumbras B	26	10	6	10	42	37	+5	36	Ineligible for promotion
10	NFA	26	8	3	15	44	45	−1	27	
11	Trakai B	26	7	5	14	39	59	−20	26	Ineligible for promotion
12	Žalgiris B	26	6	3	17	26	57	−31	21	Ineligible for promotion
13	Kupiškis (R)	26	4	2	20	46	91	−45	14	Relegation to II Lyga
14	Koralas (Note: Koralas failed to appear twice for league matches and was subsequently disqualified from the league on 19 September 2018. As club had already played over 50% of the season's matches its results were kept and a 0–3 technical loss was applied for all unplayed fixtures.) (D)	26	1	0	25	5	111	−106	3	Disqualified

Source: Lietuvos Futbolas
Rules for classification: 1) Points; 2) Play-off (only if deciding champion when two teams tied) 3) Head-to-head points; 4) Head-to-head goal difference; 5) Head-to-head goals scored; 6) Head-to-head matches won; 7) Goal difference; 8) Goals scored; 9) Matches won.
(C) Champions; (D) Disqualified; (P) Promoted; (R) Relegated

== Results ==
Home \ Away	BAN	DFK	DŽI	KOR	KUP	NEV	NFA	PAK	PAN	STB	TRB	UTE	VYT	ŽLB
Banga	—	0–1	3–0	2–0	3–2	0–1	2–0	3–1	1–0	2–0	4–1	2–1	1–2	4–0
DFK Dainava	2–1	—	0–1	4–0	6–0	4–1	1–0	2–3	1–0	2–0	1–0	1–2	2–1	1–0
Džiugas	2–0	0–3	—	5–1	4–0	0–3	1–0	3–4	0–1	1–1	3–0	1–0	3–3	1–0
Koralas	0–3 (Note: Koralas received a 0–3 technical loss in a home game against Banga due to violation of regulations.)	1–3	0–2	—	0–12	0–7	2–1	0–3 (Note: Koralas was disqualified from the league on 19 September 2018. As club already played over 50% of the season's matches a 0–3 technical loss was applied for all unplayed fixtures.)	0–6	0–4	0–3 (Note: Koralas was disqualified from the league on 19 September 2018. As club already played over 50% of the season's matches a 0–3 technical loss was applied for all unplayed fixtures.)	0–3 (Note: Koralas was disqualified from the league on 19 September 2018. As club already played over 50% of the season's matches a 0–3 technical loss was applied for all unplayed fixtures.)	0–7	1–3
Kupiškis	0–3	2–6	0–4	3–0 (Note: Koralas was disqualified from the league on 19 September 2018. As club already played over 50% of the season's matches a 0–3 technical loss was applied for all unplayed fixtures.)	—	4–0	0–2	3–3	0–6	1–4	1–1	1–3	2–4	1–2
Nevėžis	1–0	0–2	3–1	9–0	3–0	—	2–0	0–1	1–2	3–2	3–1	2–2	1–1	2–1
NFA	0–2	2–2	2–3	3–0 (Note: Koralas was disqualified from the league on 19 September 2018. As club already played over 50% of the season's matches a 0–3 technical loss was applied for all unplayed fixtures.)	5–1	3–4	—	1–3	1–1	3–1	3–1	1–3	1–0	6–0
Pakruojis	0–1	0–4	0–3	3–0 (Note: Koralas was disqualified from the league on 19 September 2018. As club already played over 50% of the season's matches a 0–3 technical loss was applied for all unplayed fixtures.)	2–1	0–3	0–0	—	2–4	2–0	2–2	2–1	3–0	2–0
Panevėžys	2–0	1–1	2–2	10–0	6–2	2–2	5–2	1–0	—	2–1	6–1	2–1	4–1	1–0
Stumbras B	0–4	1–1	3–1	3–0	5–3	0–2	3–1	4–0	2–1	—	3–0	0–1	0–0	1–0
Trakai B	1–2	2–2	1–0	3–0 (Note: Koralas was disqualified from the league on 19 September 2018. As club already played over 50% of the season's matches a 0–3 technical loss was applied for all unplayed fixtures.)	2–3	1–5	3–1	1–4	1–2	2–2	—	2–3	3–2	2–0
Utenis	2–3	2–2	1–2	3–0 (Note: Koralas was disqualified from the league on 19 September 2018. As club already played over 50% of the season's matches a 0–3 technical loss was applied for all unplayed fixtures.)	6–1	1–2	0–4	1–0	0–2	1–1	1–1	—	3–0	1–1
Vilniaus Vytis	2–3	2–2	2–1	3–0 (Note: Koralas received a 0–3 technical loss in a away game against Vilniaus Vytis due to violation of regulations.)	8–1	2–2	3–1	5–1	4–2	3–0	5–2	0–3	—	5–2
Žalgiris B	3–2	0–3	1–5	3–0 (Note: Koralas was disqualified from the league on 19 September 2018. As club already played over 50% of the season's matches a 0–3 technical loss was applied for all unplayed fixtures.)	3–2	1–1	2–1	1–3	0–6	1–1	1–2	0–1	1–2	—

Source: Lietuvos Futbolas (in Lithuanian)
Legend: Blue = home team win; Yellow = draw; Red = away team win.
Notes:

Promotion play-off
Team 1	Agg.	Team 2	1st leg	2nd leg
DFK Dainava	0 : 5	FK Palanga	0 : 3	0 : 2

== Attendance ==
=== Average home attendances ===
Pos	Team	Total	High	Low	Average	Change
1	DFK Dainava	8,855	1,630	400	682	+65.1%
2	Panevėžys	6,834	800	300	526	+79.5%
3	Banga	5,942	800	150	458	−11.2%
4	Džiugas	4,250	600	200	327	+0.9%
5	Nevėžis	3,650	1,300	70	281	+71.3%
6	Utenis	2,193	370	80	182	−59.8%^{1}
7	Vilniaus Vytis	1,389	230	20	116	−18.3%
8	Pakruojis	1,345	200	50	113	−16.3%
9	Žalgiris B	1,174	241	50	98	+11.4%
10	Kupiškis	1,145	200	50	96	n/a
11	Stumbras B	1,188	150	40	92	−9.8%
12	NFA	935	157	40	85	n/a^{2}
13	Trakai B	845	154	35	71	+1.4%
14	Koralas	458	100	20	51	−60.8%
	League total	40,193	1,630	20	237	+20.3%^{3}

Updated to games played on 14 December 2018
Source: Lietuvos Futbolas
Notes:
1: Team played in the A Lyga last season.
2: Official attendance statistic from 1 of the NFA home matches was not publicly released.
3: Official attendance statistic from 1 leagues matches was not publicly released.

=== Highest attendances ===
Rank	Round	Home team	Score	Away team	Attendance	Date	Stadium
1	26	DFK Dainava	6–0	Kupiškis	1,630	20 October 2018	Alytus Stadium
2	26	Nevėžis	1–2	Panevėžys	1,300	20 October 2018	Kėdainiai Stadium
3	21	DFK Dainava	2–1	Banga	1,150	17 October 2018	Alytus Stadium
4	25	DFK Dainava	2–1	Vilniaus Vytis	1,050	13 October 2018	Alytus Stadium
5	11	Banga	1–0	Panevėžys	800	10 June 2018	Gargždai Stadium
5	16	Panevėžys	1–1	DFK Dainava	800	10 August 2018	Aukštaitija Stadium
5	25	Panevėžys	6–2	Kupiškis	800	13 October 2018	Aukštaitija Stadium
8	17	DFK Dainava	1–0	Žalgiris B	700	17 August 2018	Alytus Stadium
8	17	Panevėžys	4–1	Vilniaus Vytis	700	19 August 2018	Aukštaitija Stadium
8	24	Panevėžys	2–0	Banga	700	7 October 2018	Aukštaitija Stadium
