= 2019 II Lyga =

II Lyga
- Season: 2019

The 2019 II Lyga season is the third season since return to two divisions system, the twenty-first after switch to spring-to-fall format and the thirty-first overall after the restoration of Independence.

The II Lyga is the third-tier of football in Lithuania. It is divided into the South Zone and the West Zone, this season containing respectively thirteen and ten clubs. The winning teams from each division are promoted to the I Lyga, while the last placed teams from both divisions are relegated to the appropriate regional division of the III Lyga, except in separately regulated cases for the B teams of higher-tier clubs. The final list of participants often does not correlate to the final results of the previous season, as the participation is finalized through the Lithuanian Football Federation league licensing process.

== II Lyga South Zone ==
=== Team changes ===
==== In ====
- Utenis was relegated from the 2018 LFF I Lyga.
- Atlantas B, although relegated, remained in from II Lyga in 2019 as their first team participates in the 2019 A Lyga.
- As FK Panevėžys gained promotion to the 2019 A Lyga, the Panevėžys B was formed and added to 2019 A Lyga.
- Aukštaitija returned to LFF league system for the first time since 2011.
- Newly formed Marijampolė City licensed to the league.
- Vidzgiris returned to LFF league system for the first time since 2011.

==== Out ====
- FK Polonija withdrew from participation in any league
- FK Panerys Vilnius withdrew from participation in any league

II Lyga South Zone
- Season: 2019
- Champions: Kauno Žalgiris B
- Promoted: Kauno Žalgiris B Šilas
- Relegated: Nevėžis B
- Matches: 156
- Goals: 789 (5.06 per match)
- Top goalscorer: Ričardas Beniušis (35 goals)
- Biggest home win: Panevėžys B 14–0 Nevėžis B (24 November 2019)
- Biggest away win: Sūduva B 0–10 Kauno Žalgiris B (30 April 2019)
- Highest scoring: Panevėžys B 14–0 Nevėžis B (24 November 2019)
- Highest attendance: 200; Aukštaitija v Panevėžys B (19 August 2019)
- Lowest attendance: 7 TERA v Kauno Žalgiris B (15 May 2019); FM Ateitis v Šilas (15 October 2019)
- Total attendance: 7,793
- Average attendance: 52
- All statistics correct as of 3 December 2019.

=== League table ===
Pos	Team	Pld	W	D	L	GF	GA	GD	Pts	Promotion or relegation
1	Kauno Žalgiris B (C, P)	24	19	2	3	94	33	+61	59	Promotion to LFF I Lyga
2	Šilas (P)	24	19	1	4	92	26	+66	58	Promotion to LFF I Lyga
3	Aukštaitija	24	15	5	4	97	37	+60	50	
4	Panevėžys B	24	14	4	6	85	37	+48	46	Ineligible for relegation
5	Marijampolė City	24	12	6	6	53	35	+18	42	
6	Viltis	24	12	4	8	60	53	+7	40	
7	FM Ateitis	24	11	3	10	70	59	+11	36	
8	Sveikata	24	9	3	12	45	44	+1	30	
9	Vidzgiris	24	7	1	16	46	81	−35	22	
10	TERA	24	6	2	16	45	78	−33	20	
11	Utenis	24	5	4	15	27	71	−44	19	
12	Nevėžis B (R)	24	4	2	18	45	117	−72	14	Relegation to III Lyga
13	Sūduva B	24	4	1	19	30	118	−88	13	Ineligible for relegation

Updated to match(es) played on 3 December 2019. Source: Lietuvos Futbolas (in Lithuanian)
Rules for classification: 1) Points; 2) Play-off (only if deciding champion when two teams tied) 3) Head-to-head points; 4) Head-to-head goal difference; 5) Head-to-head goals scored; 6) Head-to-head matches won; 7) Goal difference; 8) Goals scored; 9) Matches won.
(C) Champions; (P) Promoted; (R) Relegated

=== Results ===
Home \ Away	ATE	AUK	KŽB	MCT	NVB	PNB	SDB	SVK	ŠIL	TER	UTE	VDZ	VLT
FM Ateitis	—	3–4	1–0	1–1	8–4	4–0	5–1	4–2	3–5	2–1	7–0	5–2	3–3
Aukštaitija	4–4	—	3–5	5–0	7–0	1–1	12–0	0–1	2–1	5–0	5–1	8–1	0–3
Kauno Žalgiris B	6–1	3–5	—	2–1	7–1	7–1	3–1	4–2	1–1	4–0	1–0	6–0	7–2
Marijampolė City	2–1	2–2	1–3	—	3–1	1–4	1–3	2–0	0–2	4–1	1–1	4–1	1–1
Nevėžis B	1–0	3–3	0–4	1–3	—	3–3	6–3	0–2	2–5	4–7	1–4	4–8	2–0
Panevėžys B	10–0	1–1	2–3	1–1	14–0	—	7–0	1–0	2–1	9–1	1–0	3–0	1–2
Sūduva B	0–7	0–9	0–10	2–7	3–6	0–2	—	2–1	0–5	1–6	3–0	1–0	4–5
Sveikata	1–3	2–5	1–1	2–2	5–0	1–2	3–0	—	0–5	3–2	5–0	5–1	2–3
Šilas	4–1	0–7	6–1	0–2	11–0	2–0	5–0	3–1	—	3–0	5–1	8–0	4–2
TERA	1–0	0–2	2–3	0–4	6–3	4–6	4–1	0–2	0–6	—	3–1	2–4	2–7
Utenis	1–4	1–4	1–5	0–4	3–1	1–0	2–2	4–3	0–5	0–0	—	1–1	2–0
Vidzgiris	3–2	0–1	1–4	1–3	6–1	2–7	7–3	0–1	0–3	2–1	5–1	—	1–3
Viltis	3–1	5–2	0–4	0–3	2–1	2–7	5–0	0–0	1–2	2–2	5–2	4–0	—

Source: Lietuvos Futbolas (in Lithuanian)
Legend: Blue = home team win; Yellow = draw; Red = away team win.

=== Attendance ===
Pos	Team	Total	High	Low	Average	Change
1	Sveikata	1,203	150	49	101	+3.1%
2	Šilas	1,083	155	50	91	−9.9%
3	Utenis	777	100	35	65	−64.3%^{1}
4	Aukštaitija	742	200	24	62	n/a
5	Vidzgiris	623	100	25	57	n/a^{2}
6	Panevėžys B	663	100	15	56	n/a
7	Marijampolė City	521	120	15	53	n/a^{3}
8	Viltis	468	70	10	39	+21.9%
9	Kauno Žalgiris B	455	56	15	38	+2.7%
10	Nevėžis B	371	65	10	31	−31.1%
11	Sūduva B	364	44	8	31	−8.8%
12	FM Ateitis	341	70	7	29	−38.3%
13	TERA	182	30	7	17	−37.0%^{4}
	League total	7,793	200	7	52	+8.3%^{5}

Updated to games played on complete
Source: Lietuvos Futbolas
Notes:
1: Team played in the I Lyga last season.
2: Official attendance statistic from 1 of the Vidzgiris home matches was not publicly released.
3: Official attendance statistic from 2 of the Marijampolė City home matches was not publicly released.
4: Official attendance statistic from 1 of the TERA home matches was not publicly released.
5: Official attendance statistic from 4 leagues matches was not publicly released.

== II Lyga West Zone ==
=== Team changes ===
==== In ====
- FSK Radviliškis gained promotion from 2018 III Lyga Šiauliai Zone.
- Kražantė finished 7th in 2018 III Lyga Šiauliai Zone, but succeeded in licensing to 2019 II Lyga.

==== Out ====
- FK Minija won 2018 II league title and advanced to 2019 I Lyga.
- FK Atmosfera (2012) took 3rd place in 2018 II league, but succeeded in licensing to 2019 I Lyga.
- FA Šiauliai took 6th place in 2018 II league, but succeeded in licensing to 2019 I Lyga.
- Gargždų Pramogos-SC withdrew from association football and only played futsal in 2019.
- FK Širvėna Biržai withdrew from participation in any league.
- FK Akmenė withdrew from participation in any league.

II Lyga West Zone
- Season: 2019
- Champions: Radviliškis
- Promoted: Radviliškis; Akmenės Cementas
- Relegated: Saned
- Matches: 90
- Goals: 455 (5.06 per match)
- Top goalscorer: Deividas Dargužas (34 goals)
- Biggest home win: Babrungas 18–0 Saned (20 September 2019)
- Biggest away win: Atlantas B 1–11 Radviliškis (20 April 2019)
- Highest scoring: Babrungas 18–0 Saned (20 September 2019)
- Highest attendance: 200; Banga B v Babrungas (25 August 2019)
- Lowest attendance: 5 Atlantas B v Banga B (14 September 2019); Saned v Džiugas B (10 October 2019)
- Total attendance: 4,206
- Average attendance: 51
- All statistics correct as of 27 November 2018.

=== League table ===
Pos	Team	Pld	W	D	L	GF	GA	GD	Pts	Promotion or relegation
1	Radviliškis (C, P)	18	14	2	2	79	20	+59	44	Promotion to LFF I Lyga
2	Banga B	18	14	0	4	67	33	+34	42	Eligible for promotion only as league champions
3	Akmenės Cementas (P)	18	11	2	5	45	22	+23	35	Promotion to LFF I Lyga
4	Šilutė	18	11	1	6	52	25	+27	34	
5	Babrungas	18	10	2	6	69	38	+31	32	
6	Džiugas B	18	8	4	6	44	29	+15	28	Ineligible for relegation
7	Palanga B	18	5	4	9	37	35	+2	19	Ineligible for promotion
8	Kražantė	18	3	1	14	22	87	−65	10 (Note: Kražantė ahead of Saned on head-to-head record; Saned–Kražantė 3–1, Kražantė–Saned 3–0.)	
9	Saned (R)	18	3	1	14	19	78	−59	10	Relegation to III Lyga
10	Atlantas B	18	1	3	14	21	88	−67	6	Ineligible for relegation

Source: Lietuvos Futbolas (in Lithuanian)
Rules for classification: 1) Points; 2) Play-off (only if deciding champion when two teams tied) 3) Head-to-head points; 4) Head-to-head goal difference; 5) Head-to-head goals scored; 6) Head-to-head matches won; 7) Goal difference; 8) Goals scored; 9) Matches won.
(C) Champions; (P) Promoted; (R) Relegated

=== Results ===
Home \ Away	AKC	ATB	BAB	BGB	DŽB	KRŽ	PLB	RDV	SAN	ŠLT
Akmenės Cementas	—	5–0	3–0	6–0	1–1	3–0 (Note: Kražantė received a 0–3 technical loss in a away game against Akmenės Cementas due to violation of regulations.)	2–1	0–1	7–0	0–2
Atlantas B	0–3	—	0–9	2–7	0–7	5–1	0–0	1–11	2–2	2–5
Babrungas	3–3	5–2	—	5–0	2–0	4–2	1–3	1–3	18–0	2–2
Banga B	4–2	4–1	6–1	—	0–1	14–0	4–3	1–2	7–2	2–1
Džiugas B	1–2	4–2	0–4	1–2	—	4–2	0–0	2–2	2–1	0–1
Kražantė	1–2	3–3	0–4	2–4	1–10	—	3–0	0–3	3–0	0–6
Palanga B	3–2	8–0	7–3	0–2	2–2	1–2	—	2–2	5–1	0–2
Radviliškis	1–2	5–1	7–1	3–4	4–1	14–1	3–1	—	6–0	2–0
Saned	1–2	3–0 (Note: Atlantas B received a 0–3 technical loss in a away game against Saned due to violation of regulations. The original match ended in a 2–3 victory for Atlantas B.)	0–4	0–2	0–4	3–1	3–0 (Note: Palanga B received a 0–3 technical loss in a away game against Saned due to violation of regulations.)	1–6	—	2–5
Šilutė	3–0	6–0	0–2	1–4	3–4	7–0	3–1	1–4	4–0	—

Source: Lietuvos Futbolas (in Lithuanian)
Legend: Blue = home team win; Yellow = draw; Red = away team win.

=== Attendance ===
Pos	Team	Total	High	Low	Average	Change
1	Banga B	838	200	30	94	+168.6%
2	Babrungas	522	120	32	66	−21.4%^{2}
3	Šilutė	575	150	20	64	+42.2%
4	Akmenės Cementas	480	100	25	60	+57.9%
5	Radviliškis	485	70	35	54	+20.0%^{1}
6	Džiugas B	400	80	15	45	−21.1%
7	Palanga B	289	70	11	37	−38.3%^{3}
8	Saned	185	50	5	27	+12.5%^{4}
9	Kražantė	210	30	20	27	+58.8%^{1,5}
10	Atlantas B	222	50	5	25	n/a^{1}
	League total	4,206	200	5	51	−8.9%^{6}

Updated to games played on complete
Source: Lietuvos Futbolas
Notes:
1: Team played in the III Lyga last season.
2: Official attendance statistic from 1 of the Babrungas home matches was not publicly released.
3: Official attendance statistic from 1 of the Palanga B home matches was not publicly released.
4: Official attendance statistic from 1 of the Saned home matches was not publicly released.
5: Official attendance statistic from 1 of the Kražantė home matches was not publicly released.
8: Official attendance statistic from 4 leagues matches was not publicly released.

== Number of teams by counties ==
Number of teams	County	Team(s)
4	Klaipėda	Atlantas B, Banga B, Palanga B and Šilutė
4	Marijampolė	Marijampolė City, Sūduva B, Sveikata and Šilas
4	Šiauliai	Akmenės Cementas, Kražantė, Radviliškis and Saned
3	Vilnius	FM Ateitis, TERA and Viltis
2	Kaunas	Kauno Žalgiris B and Nevėžis B
2	Panevėžys	Aukštaitija and Panevėžys B
2	Telšiai	Babrungas and Džiugas B
1	Alytus	Vidzgiris
1	Utena	Utenis
