= Alytus (disambiguation) =

Alytus is a city in Lithuania.

Alytus may also refer to:

- Alytus County, a county in Lithuania
- Alytus District Municipality, a municipality in Lithuania
- Alytus railway station
- 233661 Alytus, a minor planet

== Sports ==
- Alytus Arena
- Alytus Stadium
- BC Alytus
- BC Dzūkija, also known as Alytus Dzūkija
- FK Dainava Alytus
- SM Alytis-2 Alytus

== See also ==
- Alytus municipality (disambiguation)
