= 2019 LFF I Lyga =

I Lyga
- Season: 2019

The 2019 LFF I Lyga was the 30th season of the I Lyga, the second tier association football league of Lithuania. The season began on 22 March 2019 and finished on 27 October 2019.

== Licensing process ==
The Lithuanian Football Federation initially granted applications for 2019 LFF I Lyga licenses: FK Banga Gargždai, FK Nevėžis, FC Pakruojis, FC Džiugas, Žalgiris B, Stumbras B, Riteriai B (Trakai B).

After the appeal, on 28 February 2019 Lithuanian Football Federation granted licenses to FK Vilnius (Baltijos Futbolo Akademija), FK Minija Kretinga, DFK Dainava, Vilniaus Vytis, FK Atmosfera (2012), FC Hegelmann Litauen.

The final decision on the number of teams in 2019 LFF I Lyga was made by the Lithuanian Football Federation executive committee meeting on 15 March 2019. Exceptions were applied to FK Jonava (financial criteria were not met), FC Kupiškis (sporting criteria were not met) and FA Šiauliai (legal criteria were not met) and the teams were allowed to start in the 2019 LFF I Lyga championship, pending criteria to be met by June. The 16 team championship started on 22 March 2019.

The applications for the 2019 LFF I Lyga licenses were also received from FK Sveikata Kybartai, FM Ateitis and FK NFA but licenses were not granted. FK Utenis Utena shareholders voted to withdraw from participation in 2019 LFF I Lyga, and the club will participate in 2019 LFF II Lyga. FK Koralas Klaipėda was dissolved in 2018.

Team	Town	Stadium	Capacity	Notes
FK Jonava	Jonava	Jonavos miesto stadionas	1,400	Relegated from A Lyga. Granted participation by exception
FK Banga	Gargždai	Gargždų miesto stadionas	3,250	
DFK Dainava	Alytus	Alytaus miesto stadionas	4,000	
FC Džiugas	Telšiai	Telšių miesto centrinis stadionas	3,000	
FK Nevėžis	Kėdainiai	Kėdainių miesto centrinis stadionas	3,000	
FC Pakruojis	Pakruojis	Pakruojo miesto stadionas	2,000	
Riteriai B	Vilnius	LFF stadionas	5,400	Renamed from Trakai B
Stumbras B	Kaunas	NFA stadionas	1,000	
FA Šiauliai	Šiauliai	Savivaldybės stadionas	9,125	Granted participation by exception
Vilniaus Vytis	Vilnius	LFF stadionas	5,400	
FK Vilnius (2019)	Vilnius	Fabijoniškių stadionas	340	Renamed from Baltijos Futbolo Akademija
Žalgiris B	Vilnius	LFF stadionas	5,400	
FC Kupiškis	Kupiškis	Kupiškio miesto stadionas	1,000	Relegated from I Lyga, but granted participation by exception
FK Atmosfera (2012)	Mažeikiai	Mažeikių miesto stadionas	2,500	Promoted from II Lyga
FC Hegelmann Litauen	Kaunas	NFA stadionas	1,000	Promoted from II Lyga
FK Minija (2017)	Kretinga	Kretingos miesto stadionas	1,000	Promoted from II Lyga
FK Utenis Utena	Utena			Withdrew from participation in I Lyga
FK NFA	Kaunas			Dissolved as part of NFA restructuring
FK Koralas Klaipėda	Klaipėda			Dissolved in 2018

== Final standings ==
After FC Stumbras ran into financial difficulties in June the Lithuania Football Federation made a decision to withdraw their license from A lyga, and Stumbras B from I lyga.

Pos	Team	Pld	W	D	L	GF	GA	GD	Pts	Promotion or relegation
1	FC Džiugas Telšiai	28	19	4	5	58	23	+35	61	Promotion
2	FK Banga Gargždai	28	17	5	6	57	24	+33	56	Won promotion play-off
3	Vilniaus Vytis	28	17	4	7	74	31	+43	55	
4	DFK Dainava	28	17	2	9	64	32	+32	53	
5	FK Nevėžis Kėdainiai	28	16	4	8	66	37	+29	52	
6	FA Šiauliai	28	14	5	9	61	37	+24	47	
7	FC Hegelmann Litauen	28	12	8	8	57	42	+15	44	
8	FK Minija (2017)	28	12	5	11	54	49	+5	41	
9	FK Jonava	28	12	4	12	55	46	+9	40	
10	FC Kupiškis	28	10	6	12	49	56	−7	36	
11	FK Vilnius (2019)	28	10	3	15	56	53	+3	33	
12	Riteriai B	28	9	5	14	61	49	+12	32	
13	Žalgiris B	28	6	4	18	43	83	−40	22	Relegation
14	FK Atmosfera (2012)	28	3	4	21	23	96	−73	13	Relegation
15	FC Pakruojis	28	3	3	22	25	145	−120	12	Relegation
16	FC Stumbras B	0	0	0	0	0	0	0	0	Withdrawn

FC Džiugas Telšiai earned promotion to A lyga, subject to meeting licensing criteria. FK Banga Gargždai earned a play-off with A lyga 7th placed FK Palanga.

Promotion play-off
Team 1	Agg.	Team 2	1st leg	2nd leg
FK Banga Gargždai	4 : 2	FK Palanga	2 : 0	2 : 2

== Top scorers ==
#	Player	Team	Goals
1–2.	(Colombia) José Luis Balanta	DFK Dainava	19
1–2.	(Lithuania) Evaldas Kugys	Nevėžis Kėdainiai	19
3.	(Lithuania) Mantas Makutunovičius	Vilniaus Vytis	17
