= FK Atmosfera =

FK Atmosfera might refer to:

- FK Atmosfera Mažeikiai
- FK Atmosfera (2012)
