= 1942 LFF Lyga =

LFF Lyga
- Season: 1942
- Champions: LFLS Kaunas

The 1942 LFF Lyga was the 21st season of the LFF Lyga football competition in Lithuania. LFLS Kaunas won the championship.

== Kaunas Group ==
Pos	Team	Pld	W	D	L	GF	GA	GD	Pts
1	LFLS Kaunas	4	3	1	0	12	3	+9	7
2	Tauras Kaunas	4	3	0	1	11	7	+4	6
3	Perkūnas Kaunas	4	2	0	2	11	12	−1	4
4	LGSF Kaunas	4	1	1	2	9	9	0	3
5	Kovas Kaunas	4	0	0	4	9	21	−12	0

Source: rsssf.com

== Šiauliai Group ==
Pos	Team	Pld	W	D	L	GF	GA	GD	Pts
1	Gubernija Šiauliai	3	3	0	0	20	3	+17	6
2	Žaibas Joniškis	3	2	0	1	10	13	−3	4
3	Žaibas Kuršėnai	3	1	0	2	4	9	−5	2
4	Batas Šiauliai	3	0	0	3	1	10	−9	0

Source: rsssf.com

== Panevėžys Group ==
Pos	Team	Pld	W	D	L	GF	GA	GD	Pts
1	MSK Panevėžys	2	2	0	0	11	1	+10	4
2	Vilkas Biržai	2	1	0	1	4	8	−4	2
3	Grandis Rokiškis	2	0	0	2	0	6	−6	0

Source: rsssf.com

== Sūduva Group ==
- Sveikata Kybartai 6-0 Sūduva Marijampolė

== Ukmergė Group ==
- Perkūnas Ukmergė

== Žemaitija Group ==
- Džiugas Telšiai 2-1 Babrungas Plungė

== Quarterfinal ==
- Gubernija Šiauliai 8-2 Džiugas Telšiai
- MSK Panevėžys 5-2 Perkūnas Ukmergė
- LFLS Kaunas 5-1 Sveikata Kybartai

== Semifinal ==
- MSK Panevėžys 5-1 Gubernija Šiauliai
- LFLS Kaunas 3-1 LFLS Vilnius

== Final ==
- LFLS Kaunas 2-0 MSK Panevėžys
