= Gvidas Juška =

Lithuanian association football player

Personal information
- Date of birth: 17 August 1982 (age 44)
- Place of birth: Lithuanian SSR, Soviet Union
- Positions: Midfielder; forward

Senior career*
Years	Team	Apps	(Gls)
- FK Žalgiris
- FK Mastis Telšiai
- FK Ekranas
- FK Mastis Telšiai
- FK Babrungas Plungė
-2009	FBK Kaunas		
- FK Šilutė→(loan)
- FK Sūduva→(loan)
	FK Atlantas→(loan)		(5)
2010	FK Banga Gargždai	15	(4)
2010-2011	Shuvalan FK	31	(10)
2011	FK Banga Gargždai	8	(3)
2012	FK Kruoja Pakruojis	18	(4)
2014	FK Šilutė		
-2019	FK Palanga	32+	(4+)
2019-	FK Minija	25	(11)
- * Club domestic league appearances and goals

Gvidas Juška (born 17 August 1982 in Lithuania) is a Lithuanian footballer.

== Career ==
At the age of 14, Juška boarded at the Lithuanian Olympic Sports Center, along with other athletes.

In 2010, Juška signed for Shuvalan in Azerbaijan, which was sponsored by an Azerbaijani airline and where the team was accommodated at a five-star hotel. Despite helping the club reach fourth place and qualify for European competition, he was released at the end of the season.

After playing for FK Kruoja Pakruojis, Juška did not receive offers that interested him, so went to Norway, where he worked in construction.
