= I Lyga =

LFF I Lyga
- Founded: 1923; 103 years ago
- Country: Lithuania
- Number of clubs: 16
- Level on pyramid: 2
- Promotion to: TOPLYGA
- Relegation to: II Lyga
- Current champions: FK Transinvest (2nd title) (2025)
- Broadcaster(s): futbolas.tv
- Website: www.1lyga.lt
- Current: 2026 I Lyga

The LFF Pirma Lyga, TOPsport Pirma Lyga, or Pirma Lyga, is the second tier of professional Lithuanian football championship.

== Format ==
Organized by the Lithuanian Football Federation (LFF), I Lyga is contested by 16 teams, with the top team gaining promotion to TOPLYGA and replaced by the lowest-placed team in top division. The second-placed team qualifies to a promotion play-off with TOPLYGA's second to last team. Bottom 2 clubs are relegated to the II Lyga, and 3rd last team plays a play-off with the 3rd placed team in II Lyga. The final list of participants often does not correlate to the final results of the previous season, as the participation is finalized through the Lithuanian Football Federation league licensing process. Number of participants also fluctuate due to frequent club collapses.

== History ==
There were 15 teams competing in the 2017 season. At the end of this season, three teams withdrew from the league.

In 2018, there were 14 teams that started the championship. However, FK Koralas Klaipėda withdrew in the mid-season. After the end of the season, two more teams have withdrawn from participation in the next season.

The 2019 season saw 16 teams starting the championship. In June FC Stumbras ran into financial difficulties, its license was withdrawn from the A Lyga, along with Stumbras B license in the I Lyga. In July Stumbras B was removed from the league, with all results annulled as the team played less than half of all season games. At the end of the season I Lyga side FC Kupiškis was found to be involved in match-fixing, and subsequently fined and demoted to II Lyga.

Although the 2019 I Lyga winners FC Džiugas Telšiai won promotion to A lyga, the club failed to meet 2020 A Lyga licensing criteria, and had their promotion was forfeited. Only FK Banga Gargždai had advanced to A Lyga.

The 2020 season was affected by the COVID-19 pandemic, and was shortened to 1.5 rounds. 14 teams participated in the tournament, with four teams offered promotion to A Lyga.

2021 season ran in full despite some COVID-19 threats. As four teams advanced to the A Lyga, and one club withdrew, five teams joined from the II Lyga. Previous season winner FK Jonava were denied A Lyga license because of allegations of match-fixing. The league consisted of 14 teams, with an expectation to expand the league to 16 the next season.

2022 season featured stable 16 team tournament and a fierce fight for the promotion to A lyga. Eventually, DFK Dainava secured the promotion, returning to A lyga after one season.

== Teams ==
=== 2026 ===
2026 Pirma lyga

#	Team	Licence	Note
1.	FK Atmosfera		
2.	FK Babrungas		
3.	BFA Vilnius		
4.	FC Neptūnas	(TOPLYGA)	
5.	FK Minija		
6.	FK Garliava		
7.	Be1 NFA		
8.	FK Nevėžis		
9.	DFK Dainava		
10.	FK Jonava		
11.	FK Ekranas		
12.	FK Tauras	(TOPLYGA)	
13.	Žalgiris B		B team
14.	Panevėžys B		B team
15.	FA Šiauliai B		B team
16.	Transinvest B		B team
17.	Kauno Žalgiris B		B team
18.	Hegelmann B		B team

== Past Seasons ==
Season	Champion	Topscorer	Goals
1990	Panerys Vilnius		
1991	Žalgiris-2 Vilnius		
1991–92	Žalgiris-2 Vilnius		
1992–93	Azotas Jonava		
1993–94	Mūša Ukmergė		
1994–95	Geležinis Vilkas Vilnius	Igoris Verbovikas (Lokomotyvas Vilnius)	13
1995–96	Ranga-Politechnika Kaunas	Svajūnas Česnulis (Laisvė Šilutė)	19
1996–97	Klevas Šiauliai	Svajūnas Česnulis (Laisvė Šilutė)	23
1997–98	Dainava Alytus	Jevgenijus Medvedevas (Lietava Jonava	17
1998–99	Lietava Jonava	Marijus Kursevičius (Atletas Kaunas)	20
1999	Kauno Jėgeriai	Ruslanas Kirsanovas (Geležinis Vilkas Vilnius)	15
2000	Vėtra Rūdiškės	Šarūnas Litvinas (Pieno Cechas Kalvarija)	32
2001	Polonija Vilnius	Tomas Radzinevičius (Sūduva Marijampolė)	33
2002	Vėtra Rūdiškės	Denisas Vasilkovas (Interas Visaginas, Vėtra Rūdiškės)	27
2003	Polonija Vilnius	Vytautas Zaboras (Polonija Vilnius)	27
2004	KFK Šiauliai	Gvidas Juška (Babrungas Plungė, Kauno Jėgeriai)	21
2005	Alytis Alytus	Kęstutis Nepas (Vėtra-2 Vilnius, Alytis Alytus)	22
2006	Kauno Jėgeriai	Ramūnas Timinskas (Kruoja Pakruojis)	22
2007	Alytis Alytus	Rimantas Cepovas (Rodiklis Kaunas)	25
2008	Tauras Tauragė	Martynas Karalius (Glestum Klaipėda)	19
2009	Šilutė	Gvidas Juška (Šilutė)	21
2010	FBK Kaunas	Arsenij Buinickij (Lietava Jonava)	28
2011	REO Vilnius	Aivaras Lyberis (Nevėžis Kėdainiai)	24
2012	Lietava Jonava	Aivaras Lyberis (Nevėžis Kėdainiai)	24
2013	Klaipėdos Granitas	Aivaras Lyberis (Nevėžis Kėdainiai); Edgaras Mastianica (Klaipėdos Granitas)	18
2014	Stumbras Kaunas	Artūras Rimkevičius (Stumbras Kaunas)	26
2015	Lietava Jonava	Laurynas Stonkus (Lietava Jonava)	30
2016	Šilas Kazlų Rūda	Artur Skuratovič (Vilniaus Vytis)	31
2017	Palanga	Gvidas Juška (Palanga)	31
2018	Panevėžys	Evaldas Kugys (Nevėžis Kėdainiai)	20
2019	Džiugas Telšiai	Evaldas Kugys (Nevėžis Kėdainiai), Jose Luis Balanta (DFK Dainava)	19
2020	Nevėžis Kėdainiai	Evaldas Kugys (Nevėžis Kėdainiai)	16
2021	FA Šiauliai	Ričardas Beniušis (FK Šilas)	21
2022	DFK Dainava	Yevheniy Mohil (FK Nevėžis), Juninho (FK Babrungas)	16
2023	FK Transinvest	Henrique Devens (FK Transinvest)	22
2024	FK Riteriai	Ernestas Mickevičius (FK Be1)	18
2025	FK Transinvest	Chidera Nwoga (FK Transinvest)	28
