= Alytus railway station =

Railway station in Lithuania

Alytus

General information
- Location: Lithuania
- Coordinates: 54°23′16″N 24°03′01″E
- Owner: Lithuanian Railways

Construction
- Parking: Available

Other information
- Status: Functioning
- Station code: 123605
- Fare zone: Northwestern Federal District

History
- Opened: 1899
Location

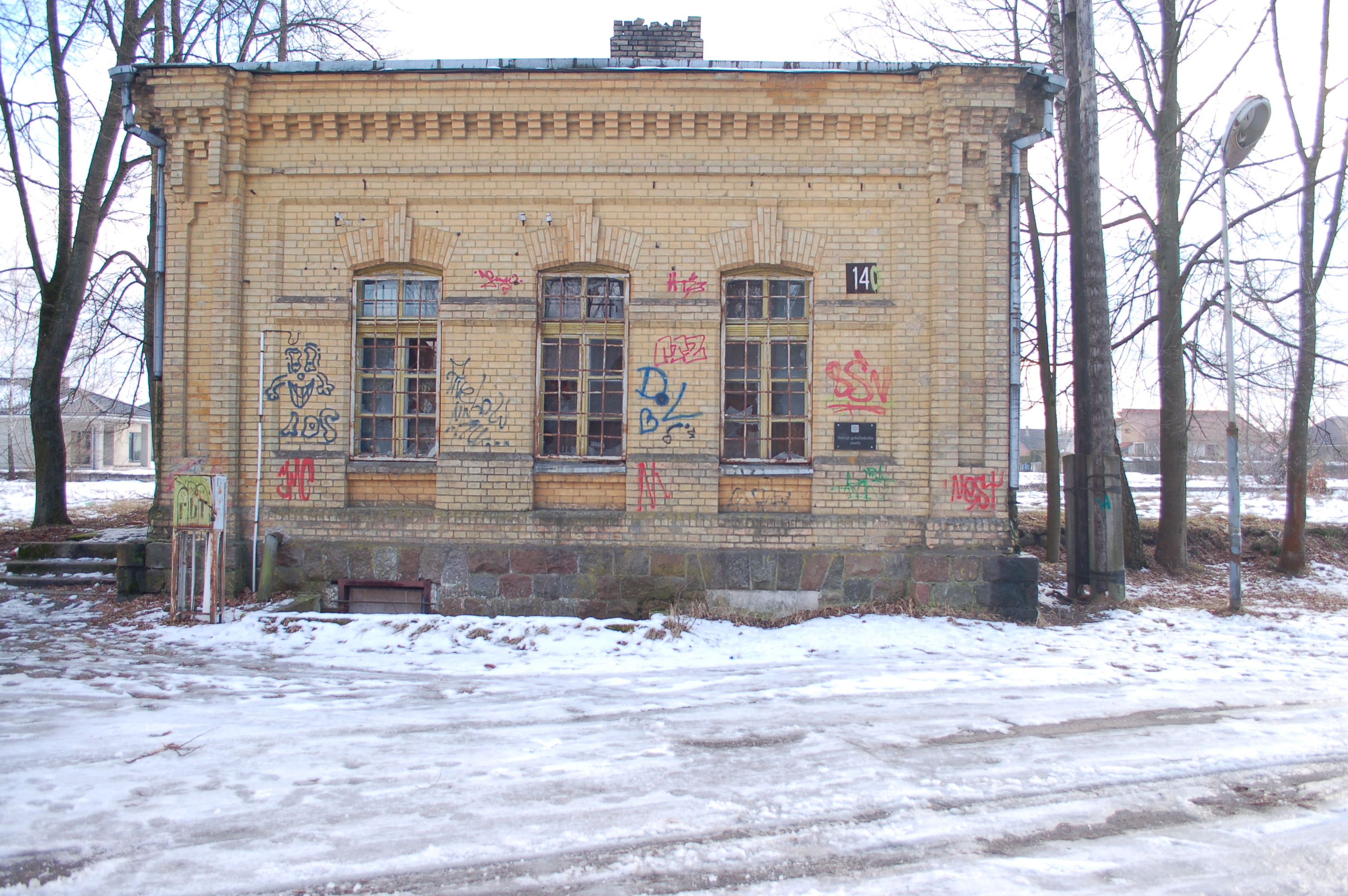
The abandoned railroad station building in 2015.

Alytus is a railway station in Lithuania. It opened in 1899.
