= Alytus municipality =

Alytus municipality may refer to:

- Alytus city municipality, Lithuania
- Alytus district municipality, Lithuania
