= List of football clubs in Lithuania =

This is a list of football (soccer) clubs in Lithuania.

== TOPLYGA (First Tier) ==
The top-flight division features 10 clubs for the 2026 season. Note that FK Riteriai had their license revoked mid-season on June 15, 2026, and their matches were subsequently annulled.

- FK Žalgiris (Vilnius)
- FK Kauno Žalgiris (Kaunas)
- FK Sūduva (Marijampolė)
- FC Hegelmann (Kaunas)
- FK Panevėžys (Panevėžys)
- FA Šiauliai (Šiauliai)
- FK TransINVEST (Vilnius / Galinė)
- FK Džiugas (Telšiai)
- FK Banga (Gargždai)
- FK Riteriai (Vilnius) — License revoked mid-season

== I Lyga (Second Tier) ==
The 2026 second tier features a mix of independent clubs and primary top-flight reserve ("B") teams:

- FK Minija (Kretinga)
- FK Babrungas (Plungė)
- FK Tauras (Tauragė)
- FK Neptūnas (Klaipėda)
- BE1 NFA (Jonava / Kaunas)
- DFK Dainava (Alytus)
- BFA (Vilnius)
- FK Atmosfera (Mažeikiai)
- Lietava (Jonava)
- FK Garliava (Garliava)
- FK Ekranas (Panevėžys)
- Reserve Teams: FK Žalgiris B, FK Transinvest B, Hegelmann Litauen II, FK Kauno Žalgiris II, Šiauliai B

== Clubs ==
| Club name | Location | Place (2020) | League (2020) | Place (2021) | League (2021) | Place (2022) | League (2022) | Place (2023) | League (2023) | Place (2024) | League (2024) | Notes |
|---|---|---|---|---|---|---|---|---|---|---|---|---|
| A Komanda | Vilnius | 1st | III Lyga (VRFS) | 1st | III Lyga (VRFS) | 11th | III Lyga (VRFS) | 8th | SFL (C Div.) | | SFL (C Div.) | |
| ADS Auto | Nemenčinė | 9th | SFL (D Div.) | 7th | SFL (D Div.) | 11th | SFL (D Div.) | 9th | SFL (D Div.) | | SFL (D Div.) | |
| AFK | Vilnius | 9th | III Lyga (VRFS) | 7th | III Lyga (VRFS) | 2nd | III Lyga (VRFS) | 4th | III Lyga (VRFS) | | III Lyga (VRFS) | |
| Anykščiai | Anykščiai | 3rd | (D Div.) | 1st | SFL (C Div.) | 4th | SFL (B Div.) | 4th | SFL (B Div.) | | SFL (A Div.) | |
| Arpas | Maišiagala | 8th | SFL (D Div.) | 10th | SFL (D Div.) | 9th | SFL (D Div.) | 8th | SFL (D Div.) | | SFL (D Div.) | |
| Ataka | Vilnius, Žvėrynas | | | 1st | SFL (D Div.) | 1st | SFL (B Div.) | | | 7th | III Lyga (VRFS) | |
| Ave. Ko. | Kalveliai | 8th | SFL (A Div.) | 4th | SFL (A Div.) | 2nd | SFL (A Div.) | 11th | SFL (A Div.) | | | |
| Baltoji Vokė | Baltoji Vokė | | | | | 4th | SFL (D Div.) | 1st | SFL (D Div.) | | | |
| FK Banga | Gargždai | 4th | A Lyga | 7th | A Lyga | 8th | A Lyga | 6th | A Lyga | | A Lyga | |
| Be1 NFA | Kaunas | | | 2nd | II Lyga | 4th | I Lyga | 2nd | I Lyga | | I Lyga | |
| DFK Dainava | Alytus | 6th | I Lyga | 9th | A Lyga | 1st | I Lyga | 8th | A Lyga | | A Lyga | |
| DFK Dainava B | Alytus | 6th | II Lyga (South) | 7th | II Lyga | 12th | II Lyga | 14th | II Lyga | | II Lyga | B Team of DFK Dainava |
| EMD Statyba-Sendvaris | Klaipėda | 2nd | III Lyga (KLFF) | 6th | III Lyga (KLFF) | 6th | III Lyga (KLFF) | 5th | III Lyga (KLFF) | | III Lyga (KLFF) | |
| ESFA-Versmė | Elektrėnai | 5th | III Lyga (VRFS) | 6th | III Lyga (VRFS) | 4th | III Lyga (VRFS) | 10th | III Lyga (VRFS) | | III Lyga (VRFS) | |
| Euforija-Tirola | Vilnius | 11th | SFL (B Div.) | 3rd | SFL (B Div.) | 10th | SFL (A Div.) | 7th | SFL (B Div.) | | SFL (B Div.) | |
| FA Šiauliai | Šiauliai | 5th | I Lyga | 1st | I Lyga | 7th | A Lyga | 3rd | A Lyga | | A Lyga | |
| FA Šiauliai B | Šiauliai | 3rd | II Lyga (West) | 5th | II Lyga | 13th | I Lyga | 12th | I Lyga | | I Lyga | The B team of FA Šiauliai |
| FC Džiugas | Telšiai | 4th | I Lyga | 8th | A Lyga | 9th | A Lyga | 9th | A Lyga | | A Lyga | |
| FC Džiugas B | Telšiai | | | 19th | II Lyga | 18th | II Lyga | 16th | II Lyga | | | The B Team of FC Džiugas |
| FC Hegelmann | Kaunas | 2nd | I Lyga | 5th | A Lyga | 4th | A Lyga | 5th | A Lyga | | A Lyga | |
| FC Malanka | | | | | | | | 1st | SFL (C Div.) | | | |
| FK Neptūnas | Klaipėda | 2nd | II Lyga | 10th | I Lyga | 2nd | I Lyga | 4th | I Lyga | | I Lyga | |
| FK Neptūnas B | Klaipėda | 1st | III Lyga (KLFF) | 2nd | III Lyga (KLFF) | 1st | III Lyga (KLFF) | 1st | III Lyga (KLFF) | | | The B team of FK Neptūnas |
| FK Atmosfera | Mažeikiai | 12th | I Lyga | 7th | I Lyga | 15th | I Lyga | 1st | II Lyga | | I Lyga | |
| FK Babrungas | Plungė | 6th | II Lyga (West) | 8th | I Lyga | 6th | I Lyga | 5th | I Lyga | | I Lyga | |
| FK Banga B | Gargždai | 1st | II Lyga (West) | 6th | I Lyga | 16th | I Lyga | 2nd | II Lyga | | A Lyga | The B team of Banga |
| FK Danspin - KKSC | Raseiniai | | | 9th | III Lyga (KAFF - MAFF) | 8th | III Lyga (KAFF) | 8th | III Lyga (KAFF) | | | |
| FK Dembava | Panevėžys | | | 2nd | III Lyga (PAFF) | 1st | III Lyga (PAFF) | 9th | II Lyga | | II Lyga | |
| FK Dembava B | Panevėžys | | | | | | | 6th | III Lyga (PAFF-ŠAFF | | III Lyga (PAFF-ŠAFF) | The B team of FK Dembava |
| FK Ekranas | Panevėžys | 4 | L2W | 1 | L2W | 2 | L2W | 1 | L2W | 6 | FT | |
| FK Ekranas B | Panevėžys | | | | | | | 11 | L2W | | | The B team of FK Ekranas |
| FK Ekranas C | Panevėžys | 7 | LA | 8 | LA | 5 | LA | 7 | LA | 7 | LA | The C team of FK Ekranas |
| FK Garliava | Garliava | 1 | L2E | 17 | L1 | 15 | L1 | 10 | L1 | 7 | FT | |
| FK Jonava | Jonava | | | 2 | L2E | | | | | | | |
| FK Jonušai | Klaipėda | 2 | L1 | 4 | L1 | 5 | L1 | 17 | L1 | 1 | L2S | |
| FK Kaišiadorys-Baltai | Kaišiadorys | 10 | L2W | | | 10 | L2W | | | | | |
| FK Kazlų Rūda | Kazlų Rūda | | | | | 4 | L2W | 5 | L2W | 9 | L1 | |
| FK Medžiai | Vilnius | | | | | | | | | 9 | L2N | |
| FK Medžiai 2 | Vilnius | | | | | 6 | L2W | | | | | The 2nd team of FK Medžiai |
| FK Minija | Kretinga | | | 6 | L2E | | | | | | | |
| FK Minija B | Kretinga | 3 | L2E | 2 | L2S | 2 | L2S | 8 | L1 | 10 | LA | The B team of FK Minija |
| FK Nadruvis | Kaunas | | | | | | | | | 10 | FT | Used to be in Šakiai |
| FK Nemunas | Prienai | 2 | L2N | 4 | L2N | 3 | L2N | 5 | L2N | 1 | L2N | |
| FK Nevėžis | Kėdainiai | | | 5 | L2E | | | | | | | |
| FK Nevėžis B | Kėdainiai | 14 | L1 | | | | | | | | | The B team of FK Nevėžis |
| FK Panevėžys | Panevėžys | 7 | L1 | 2 | L1 | 2 | L1 | 1 | L1 | 8 | L1 | |
| FK Panevėžys B | Kelmė | 9 | L2N | 2 | L2N | 1 | L2N | 2 | L2N | | | The B team of FK Panevėys |
| FK Pozityvūs | Veiveriai | 6 | L2N | 1 | L2N | 10 | L1 | 4 | L1 | 4 | L1 | |
| FK Riteriai | Vilnius | 6 | L1 | 3 | L2S | | | | | | | Used to be FK Trakai |
| FK Saned | Joniškis | 11 | L1 | 7 | L1 | 9 | L1 | 14 | L1 | 5 | L1 | |
| FK Saned B | Joniškis | | | 1 | L2E | | | | | | | The B team of FK Saned |
| FK Sirijus | Klaipėda | | | | | | | | | 3 | L2S | |
| FK Skorbutas | | | | 12 | L1 | 7 | L1 | 6 | L1 | 7 | L1 | |
| FK Sūduva B | Marijampolė | | | | | | | 9 | L2S | | | The B team of Sūduva |
| FK Tera | Vilnius | 5 | L2N | 5 | L2N | 7 | L2N | 7 | L2N | 5 | L2N | |
| FK TransINVEST | Vilnius | 6 | L2W | 7 | L2W | 3 | L2W | 1st | I Lyga | | A Lyga | |
| FK Venta | Kuršėnai | 10 | L2S | | | | | | | | | |
| FK Viltis | Vilnius | | | 13 | L2E | | | | | | | |
| FK Šilutė | Šilutė | 3 | L2S | 10 | L2S | 7 | L2S | | | | | |
| FK Šturmas | Kaunas | 13 | L1 | 3 | L1 | 10 | LA | 10 | LA | 3 | L1 | |
| FK Žalgiris | Vilnius | 2 | L2S | 8 | L2S | 10 | L2S | 7 | L2S | 13 | L2S | |
| FK Žalgiris B | Vilnius | | | 7 | L2E | | | | | | | |
| FK Žalgiris C | Vilnius | | | 12 | L2E | | | | | | | |
| FKS Ukmergė | Ukmergė | 4 | L1 | 9 | L1 | 18 | L1 | 9 | L2W | | | |
| FKS Ukmergė B | Ukmergė | 1 | L1 | 5 | L1 | 4 | L1 | | | | | |
| Futboliukas | Vilnius | | | 3 | L2E | | | | | | | |
| Gariūnai | Vilnius | | | 15 | L2E | | | | | | | |
| FK Geležinis Vilkas | Vilnius | 4 | L2N | 7 | L2N | 9 | L2N | 4 | L2N | | | |
| Granitas | Naujoji Vilnia | | | 6 | L2S | 1 | L2S | 5 | L1 | 2 | L1 | |
| Granitas B | Naujoji Vilnia | 7 | L2W | 6 | L2W | 7 | L2W | 2 | L2W | 2 | L2N | The B team of Granitas |
| Hegelmann B | Kaunas | 9 | L2W | 9 | L2W | 9 | L2W | 8 | L2W | 11 | L2N | |
| Imperialas | Vilnius | 7 | L2S | 9 | L2S | 4 | L2S | 8 | L2S | 4 | L2S | |
| Katastrofa | Vilnius | 5 | L2S | 14 | L2S | 9 | L2S | | | | | |
| Kauno Žalgiris | Kaunas | 4 | L2E | 11 | L2E | | | | | | | |
| Kauno Žalgiris B | Kaunas | | | 7 | L2S | | | | | | | |
| Ketera | Šalčininkai | | | 9 | L2E | | | | | | | |
| Klaipėdos FM | Klaipėda | | | 4 | L2E | | | | | | | |
| Klaipėdos FM B | Klaipėda | | | | | 6 | L2S | 4 | L2S | 11 | L2S | |
| Kupiškio FC ''Narjanta'' | Kupiškis | 6 | LA | 7 | LA | 3 | LA | 5 | LA | 2 | LA | |
| Lentvaris | Lentvaris | 4 | L2S | 1 | L2S | 8 | L1 | 11 | L1 | 3 | FT | |
| Marijampolės MML City | Marijampolė | 8 | L2S | 5 | L2S | 5 | L2S | 3 | L2S | 10 | L2S | Forfeit (2023 09 23) |
| Modulis | Pabradė | 2 | L2W | 2 | L2W | 13 | L1 | 4 | L2W | | | |
| Molėtai | Molėtai | 18 | L1 | 16 | L1 | 17 | L1 | 3 | L2W | 11 | L1 | |
| Navigatoriai | Vilnius | | | 5 | L2W | | | | | | | |
| Olandai | Vilnius | | | 10 | L2E | | | | | | | |
| Ozas | Vilnius | 7 | L2N | | | | | | | | | |
| PILK | Vilnius | 15 | L1 | 13 | L1 | 16 | L1 | 5 | L2S | 12 | L2S | |
| PSSK Atomas | Panevėžys | 5 | L2W | | | | | | | | | |
| Pakruojo SC-Kruoja | Pakruojis | 3 | L2N | 3 | L2N | 6 | L2N | 6 | L2N | 3 | L2N | |
| Pasvalio FC | Pasvalys | 3 | LA | 5 | LA | 4 | LA | 3 | LA | 5 | LA | |
| Problema | | 5 | L1 | 10 | L1 | 3 | L1 | 7 | L1 | 2 | FT | |
| Reaktyvas | Vilnius | | | | | | | | | 5 | L2S | |
| Rokiškis | Rokiškis | | | | | 8 | L2S | 2 | L2S | 6 | L2S | |
| SK Nemenčinė-Hegvita | Nemenčinė | 5 | L2E | | | 14 | L2S | | | | | |
| Sakuona-Rūgpienių kaimas | Plikiai | | | | | 14 | L1 | 15 | L1 | 10 | L1 | |
| Salininkai | Vilnius | | | | | | | | | 7 | L2S | |
| Sveikata | Kybartai | | | | | | | | | 14 | L2S | Oldest team in Lithuania that still exists |
| Sviedinys | Vilnius | 4 | LA | 4 | LA | 8 | LA | 4 | LA | 4 | LA | |
| FK Sūduva | Marijampolė | 12 | L1 | | | | | 9 | L1 | 1 | FT | |
| TEC | Vilnius | | | 14 | L2E | | | | | | | |
| Tauras | Tauragė | | | | | | | | | | | |
| Top Kickers | Vilnius | | | | | | | | | | | |
| Trivartis | Vilnius | | | | | | | | | | | |
| Tėvynės Sąjunga | Vilnius | | | | | | | | | | | |
| Užgiris | | | | | | | | | | | | |
| VJFK Trakai | Trakai | | | | | | | | | | | |
| VJFM Fortūna | Eiguliai | | | | | | | | | | | |
| Viesulas | Vilnius | | | | | | | | | | | |
| Vilniaus BFA | Vilnius | | | | | | | | | | | |
| Viltis B | Vilnius | | | | | | | | | | | The B team of FK Viltis |
| Vova | Vilnius | | | | | | | | | | | |
| Vėtra | Vilnius | | | | | | | | | | | |
| ŠSPC-Radviliškis | Radviliškis | | | | | | | | | | | |
| Širvintos-VGTU-Vilkai | Širvintos | | | | | | | | | | | |
| Širvėna | Biržai | | | | | | | | | | | |

== See also ==
- List of football teams
