= FC Kupiškis =

Lithuanian football club

- Full name: Football club "Kupiškis"
- Founded: 2017; 8 years ago
- Ground: Kupiškio miesto stadionas
- Capacity: 1,000
- Chairman: Danas Baronas
- Manager: x
- League: x
- 2019: ▼10th, I Lyga
Home colours	Away colours

Football club Kupiškis, commonly known as Kupiškis was a Lithuanian football team from Kupiškis.

== History ==
The club was formed in 2018, and made headlines when it was granted exception to participate straight away in the 2nd tier league even after failing the licensing process.

The club was struggling, but it made headlines again by trashing FK Koralas Klaipėda 12:0. The game was dubbed a circus, and flagged for match fixing. While investigation was taking place, another game was flagged, against FK Panevėžys. As a result of the investigation, five players were suspended. The team finished the season in 13th position, only above dissolved club FK Koralas Klaipėda.

Despite match fixing and relegation-bound position in 2018, the club was again granted exception to play in 2019 LFF I Lyga. The club struggled again, and finished the season 10th. After the end of the season, another match fixing scandal was under investigation. Six FC Kupiškis players were suspended and fined. This time the club was fined, and disqualified from the I Lyga. The club will be allowed to participate in II Lyga in 2020.

== Results ==
Season	Tier	Position	Cup
2018	II	13	1/8 f.
2019	II	10	1/16 f.

== Squad (2019) ==
3 October 2019

Note: Flags indicate national team as defined under FIFA eligibility rules; some limited exceptions apply. Players may hold more than one non-FIFA nationality.

No.	Pos.	Nation	Player
1	GK	LVA	Gļebs Sopots
89	GK	LTU	Aurimas Žirgulis
2	DF	LTU	Donatas Paulauskas
18	DF	LVA	Aleksandrs Kļimovs
20	DF	LTU	Mindaugas Butkus
43	DF	LTU	Lukas Baranauskas
88	DF	LVA	Aleksandrs Zeņkovs
5	MF	LTU	Ignas Barkauskas
8	MF	LTU	Arnas Laurenčikas

No.	Pos.	Nation	Player
16	MF	CIV	Cesar Bahi
17	MF	CMR	Rigoret Song Bahanag
26	MF	LTU	Redas Graičiūnas
40	MF	LVA	Vladislavs Grigjans
44	MF	LVA	Jevgēņijs Kazura
00	MF	JPN	Youdai Koike
7	FW	LTU	Edgaras Stankevičius
9	FW	BLR	Dzmitry Kuzmin
11	FW	LTU	Marius Zabarauskas
22	FW	LVA	Staņislavs Pihockis

== Managers ==
- (Brazil) Leonardo Iparraguire, (2018 season)
- (Latvia) Eduards Štrubo, (2019)

== Former players ==
See Category:FC Kupiškis players
