= National Football Academy of Lithuania =

National association football centre of Lithuania

Coordinates: 54°54′15″N 23°55′43″E

Nacionalinė Futbolo Akademija (National Football Academy), commonly referred to as NFA, was the national association football centre of Lithuania; Established in Kaunas with help of UEFA in 2006 until it was shut down in 2019. Only the best players from the country trained there, it has produced some high class players. Scouts from clubs like Arsenal, Liverpool, Milan and Lazio were constantly watching academy's players. The main point of this centre was to produce players for national team, Lithuania'a U-19 team was formed mainly from members of the academy, it has 15 players playing abroad. In 2019 the activity was transferred to "Be1SC" sports club. The academy changed its name to "Be1 National Football Academy". And it’s no longer part of Lithuanian Football Federation.

== See also ==
- Lithuania national football team
- Lithuania national under-21 football team
- Lithuania national under-19 football team
