= FK Atmosfera (2012) =

Lithuanian football club

- Full name: Futbolo klubas "Atmosfera"
- Founded: 1 March 2012; 14 years ago
- Ground: Mažeikiai Stadium
- Capacity: 2,400
- Coordinates: 56°18′40″N 22°20′10″E
- Manager: Marius Šluta
- League: I Lyga
- 2026: I Lyga, 9th of 16
- Website: http://www.fkatmosfera.eu/
Home colours	Away colours

Futbolo klubas Atmosfera, commonly known as Atmosfera, is a Lithuanian football club located in Mažeikiai, in Mažeikiai District. They currently play in the I Lyga, the second tier of Lithuanian football. FK Atmosfera is a phoenix club of Atmosfera Mažeikiai.

== History ==
Mažeikiai has a deep history of football. Since the mid-20th century, there was a football club that competed at the top tier of the Lithuanian SSR football league, achieving two championship titles during that time. This club changed names frequently, but was named Atmosfera Mažeikiai between 1973 and 1990. Between 1990 and 2012, several clubs in Mažeikiai rose up and fell apart, mostly due to financial circumstances. After FK Mažeikiai went bankrupt in 2011, a new football club was formed in 2012, and in honor of the past club it was named FK Atmosfera. Atmosfera means atmosphere in Lithuanian, a hommage to the clubs association to the manufacturing industry that supported the club.

Atmosfera played in the II Lyga (third tier) starting in 2013. The club did not play in any championship in 2016, but returned to the II Lyga in 2017. The 2018 season saw the team rise to 3rd position, securing promotion to the I Lyga. In the 2019 season, FK Atmosfera finished in 14th position.

After finishing the 2022 season in 15th place, Atmosfera faced relegation to the II Lyga. In the following season, the team won the II Lyga, securing promotion to the I Lyga again.

== Honours ==
=== Domestic ===
- (Lithuania) II Lyga
  - Champions (1): 2023

== Recent seasons ==
Season	Level	Division	Position	Cup	Reference
2013	3.	Antra lyga (Vakarai)	6.	—	
2014	3.	Antra lyga (Vakarai)	9.	—	
2015	3.	Antra lyga (Vakarai)	6.	Second round	
2016	X	X	X	—	
2017	3.	Antra lyga (Vakarai)	7.	Second round	
2018	3.	Antra lyga (Vakarai)	3.	Second round	
2019	2.	I Lyga	14.	Second round	
2020	2.	I Lyga	12.	Second round	
2021	2	I Lyga	7.	First round	
2022	2	I Lyga	15.	Round of 32	
2023	3.	II Lyga	1.	Round of 32	
2024	2.	I Lyga	7.	Quarter-finals	
2025	2.	I Lyga	6.	Round of 32	

== Stadium ==
Club play their home matches in Mažeikiai Stadium. The current capacity of the stadium is 2,400 seats.

== Current squad ==
As of 24 January 2026

Note: Flags indicate national team as defined under FIFA eligibility rules; some limited exceptions apply. Players may hold more than one non-FIFA nationality.

No.	Pos.	Nation	Player
1	GK	LTU	Liutauras Juška
33	GK	LTU	Džiugas Antanavičius-Šmitas
—	GK	LTU	Sergei Palijchuk
3	DF	LTU	Denisas Stankus
4	DF	LTU	Ugnius Selvenis
7	DF	LTU	Edvinas Jasaitis
11	DF	LTU	Evaldas Razulis
16	DF	LTU	Tomas Bružas
18	DF	LTU	Deividas Gineitis
21	DF	LTU	Gabrielius Domkus
—	DF	LTU	Adomas Mika

No.	Pos.	Nation	Player
8	MF	LTU	Rokas Gecevičius
10	MF	LTU	Pijus Meižis
14	MF	LTU	Mantas Daubaris
20	MF	LTU	Domantas Šluta
22	MF	LTU	Matas Šlyžius
N	MF	LTU	Martynas Vasiliauskas
17	FW	LTU	Adrijus Kontenis
