= Alytus Stadium =

Stadium in Alytus, Lithuania

Alytus central stadium
- Alytaus centrinis stadionas
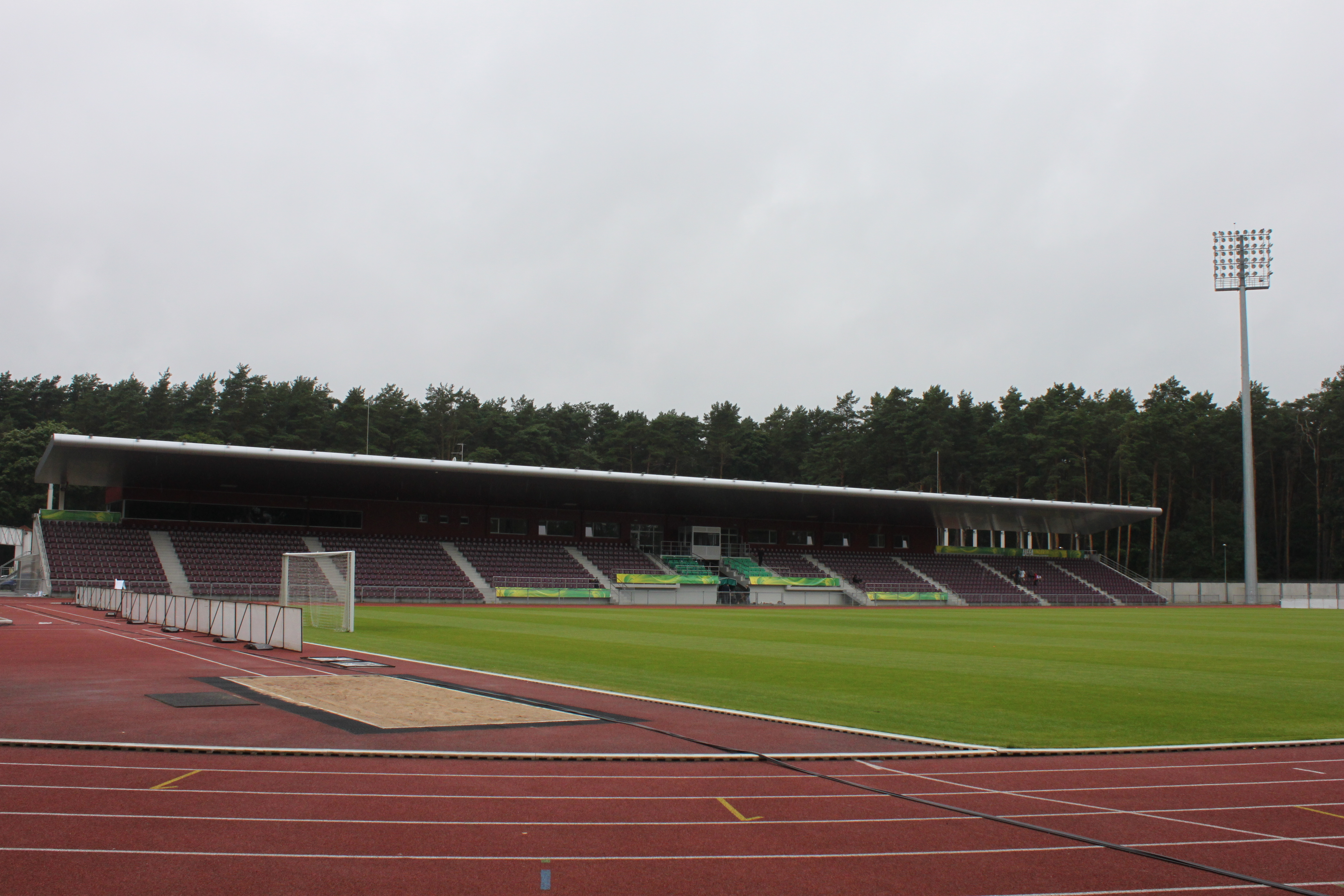
- UEFA Category 2 stadium
- Interactive map of Alytus central stadium
- Full name: Alytaus SRC stadionas
- Former names: Dzūkų stadionas
- Address: Birutės g. 5
- Location: Alytus, Lithuania
- Coordinates: 54°23′31.4″N 24°03′18.4″E
- Owner: Alytus city municipality
- Capacity: 3,726
- Surface: Grass
- Field size: 105 by 68 metres (114.8 yd × 74.4 yd)

Construction
- Opened: 1924
- Renovated: 1957–1958, 1993, 2007, 2009–2010

Tenants
- DFK Dainava (2016–present); Auska Alytus

Alytus Stadium is a multi-use stadium in Alytus, Lithuania. It is currently used mostly for football matches and is the home stadium of DFK Dainava Alytus. The stadium holds 3,726 people. Opened in 1924, the stadium was renovated four times: 1957–1958, 1993, 2007, and 2009–2010.

== Architecture ==
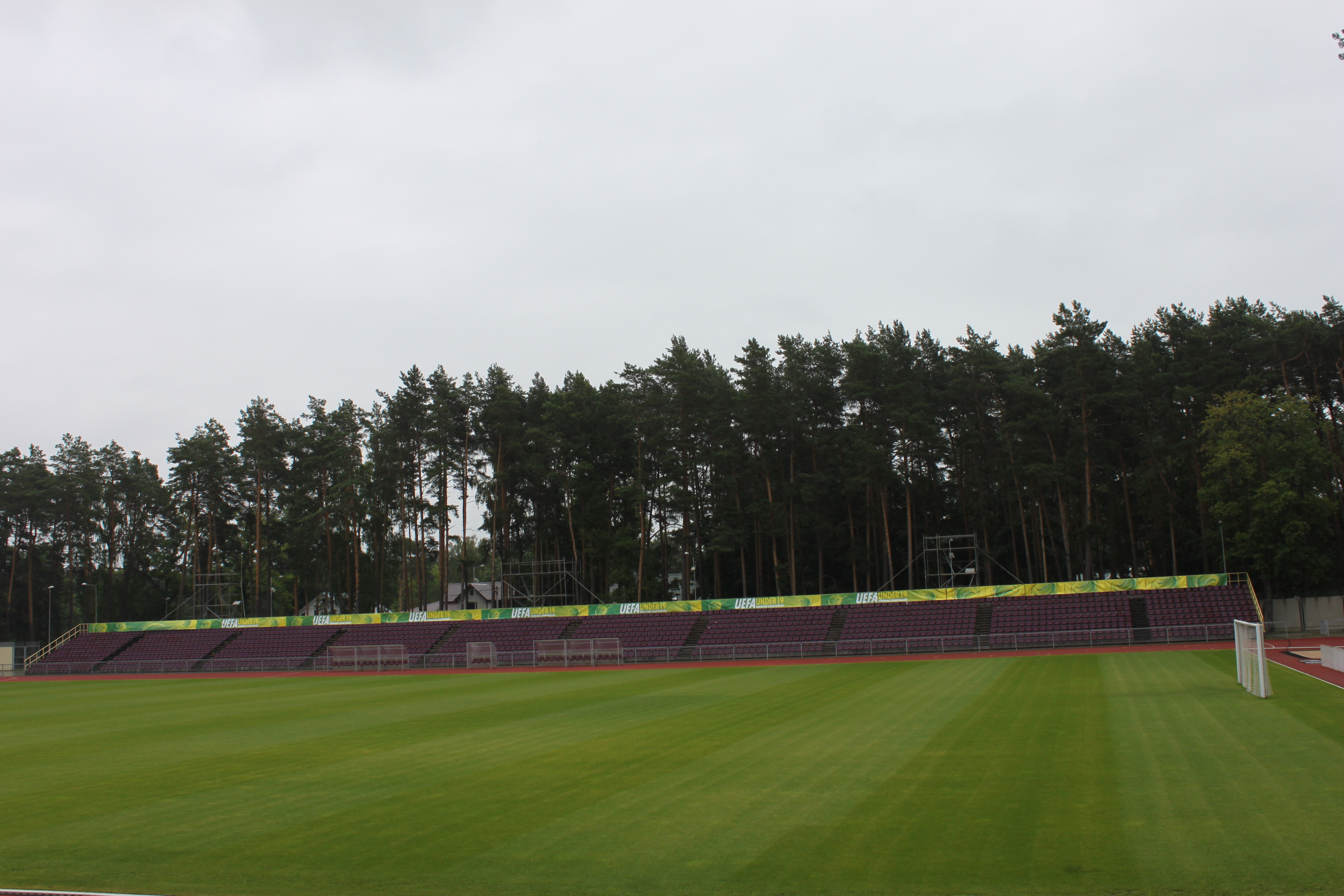
East Stand

The stadium is consisting of two opposite side-pitch stands: a 1,740 seat East stand and the main West stand, which holds 1,986 seats under a roof.
