= FK Koralas Klaipėda =

Lithuanian football club

FK Koralas
- Full name: Futbolo klubas "Koralas"
- Founded: 2015; 10 years ago
- Dissolved: September 2018; 6 years ago
- Ground: Klaipėdos dirbtinės dangos aikštė
- Capacity: 1,000
- Chairman: Arvydas Kazlauskas
- Manager: Saulius Mikalajūnas
- League: x
- 2018: 14th (dissolved)
Home colours	Away colours

Futbolo klubas Koralas, commonly known as Koralas was a Lithuanian football team from the port city of Klaipėda.

== History ==
The club was established in 2015. In that season they were in LFF III lyga (4th tier), leading for a long time, but finishing in third position.

In 2016, they were in LFF II lyga (3rd tier), were runners-up and got promotion to Pirma lyga (2nd tier).

In 2017, the team was in Pirma lyga. First half of the season was problematical, but in summer transfer time they got new forces and finished in 6th place.

2018 was problematical. After losing 0–12 to FC Kupiškis they was retired until second half of the season. After summer they won once, but later lost games against "Nevėžis" 0–9 and Panevėžys 0–10. finally, on 19 September 2018 club was dissolved from Pirma lyga competition. They played more than half matches, so results are valid. In tournament table they in 14th position.

== Honours ==
=== Domestic ===
(Lithuania) Antra lyga:

- Runner-up: 2016

== Recent seasons ==
Season	Level	League	Place	Movements
2015	4.	Trečia lyga (Klaipėda)	3.	↑ promoted ↑
2016	3.	Antra lyga (Vakarų zona)	2.	↑ promoted ↑
2017	2.	Pirma lyga	6.	
2018	2.	Pirma lyga	14.	dissvolved

== Squad (2017) ==
Note: Flags indicate national team as defined under FIFA eligibility rules; some limited exceptions apply. Players may hold more than one non-FIFA nationality.

No.	Pos.	Nation	Player
1	GK	(Lithuania) LTU	Ernestas Grudys
25	GK	(Lithuania) LTU	Dovydas Komža
2	DF	(Ukraine) UKR	Bohdan Pokoiovyi
4	DF	(Lithuania) LTU	Karolis Inta
5	DF	(Lithuania) LTU	Jurijus Kurbangalijevas
12	DF	(Lithuania) LTU	Rokas Rusys
22	DF	(Lithuania) LTU	Aidas Capas
6	MF	(Lithuania) LTU	Edgaras Drąsutis
7	MF	(Lithuania) LTU	Marius Stonkus
10	FW	(Canada) CAN	Victor Munoz
11	MF	(Lithuania) LTU	Edgaras Ditmonas

No.	Pos.	Nation	Player
13	MF	(Lithuania) LTU	Erikas Vainoras
17	MF	(Lithuania) LTU	Arnoldas Nausėdas
20	MF	(Lithuania) LTU	Donatas Surblys
21	MF	(Lithuania) LTU	Benas Babenskas
32	MF	(Lithuania) LTU	Neilas Urba (loan from FK Atlantas).
—	MF	(Lithuania) LTU	Kevinas Drungilas
9	FW	(Lithuania) LTU	Jonas Bričkus (loan from FK Atlantas).
70	FW	(Lithuania) LTU	German Jezerskij
88	FW	(Ukraine) UKR	Serhii Lozinskyi
—	FW	(Lithuania) LTU	Ernestas Razonas
—	FW	(Lithuania) LTU	Ernestas Alekna

== Managers ==
- (Lithuania) Marsel Balasanov 2016
- (Lithuania) Saulius Mikalajūnas (formally); Kęstutis Ivaškevičius (real) – 2017
