= FC Vilniaus Vytis =

Lithuanian football club

Vilniaus Vytis
- Nickname(s): Vyčiai
- Founded: 2012
- Dissolved: 2021
- Ground: LFF Stadium
- Capacity: 5.067
- Chairman: Benas Renatas Baltusis
- Manager: Algimantas Liubinskas
- 2020: I Lyga, 7th
Home colours	Away colours

FC Vilniaus Vytis was a Lithuanian football team from the city of Vilnius.

== History ==
Founded as FK TAIP in 2012. Played in amateur leagues. Was promoted to I Lyga. In 2016 changed name to Vilniaus Vytis. Few seasons was one of the strongest teams in I Lyga. In 2021 Vilniaus Vytis withdrew from 1 Lyga for one season with an option to rejoin for season 2022.

== Recent seasons ==
=== FK TAIP ===
Season	Level	League	Place	@	Notes
2012	4.	III Lyga (Vilnius)	3.		
2013	4.	III Lyga (Vilnius)	1.		
2014	4.	III Lyga (Vilnius)	1.		
2015	3.	II Lyga (Pietūs)	1.		

=== "Vilniaus Vytis" ===
Season	Level	League	Place	@	Notes
2016	2.	I Lyga	3.		
2017	2.	I Lyga	3.		
2018	2.	I Lyga	6.		
2019	2.	I Lyga	3.		
2020	2.	I Lyga	7.		
