= DFK Dainava =

Lithuanian football club

Dainava
- Full name: Dzūkija futbolo klubas Dainava
- Nicknames: Alytiškiai, Dzūkai
- Founded: 1935; 2016 (last refounded)
- Ground: Alytus Stadium
- Capacity: 3,790
- Chairman: Žydrūnas Lukošiūnas
- Head coach: Mikołaj Raczyński
- League: I Lyga
- 2026: I Lyga, 7th of 16
- Website: http://www.dfkdainava.com/
Home colours	Away colours

Dzūkija Futbolo Klubas Dainava, also. Known as DFK Dainava, is a Lithuanian professional football club from Alytus. The club was established in 2016 as a phoenix club after FK Dainava Alytus was dissolved in 2014.

== History ==
The modern DFK Dainava was established after "Auska" and "Dzūkų tankai" were merged in 2016.

In 2015, FK Auska were playing in the Pirma Lyga. In 2016 the Lithuanian Football Federation allowed the club to change its name and allowed them to play in the Pirma Lyga (second tier).

In 2016, DFK Dainava came in ninth place and in 2017 they came in fourth place in the Pirma Lyga.

In the 2018 season, DFK Dainava were runners-up in the Pirma Lyga. In the relegation/promotion play-off match, they lost 0–3 to FK Palanga. On 3 November 2018, they lost the second match in Gargždai 0–2. FK Palanga won 5–0 on aggregate and saved their place in the 2019 A Lyga.

DFK Dainava sought promotion to the A Lyga in the 2019 season, but were unable to get sponsorship required for the league from the municipality of Alytus. As a result, the club remained in the I Lyga. They have finished 2019 LFF I Lyga in fourth position, and attempted to obtain a licence for A Lyga again in the 2020 season. The application was again declined.

In March 2021 before the start of the football season in Lithuania, DFK Dainava applied for a licence to play in the highest Lithuanian league tier of A Lyga in the 2021 season. The application was declined by the Lithuanian Football Federation as the club could not find a solution with stable finance and organise a women's football team. At the time, A Lyga had nine qualified teams who got permits and were able to compete in the league. DFK Dainava's application was granted by the Lithuanian Football Federation to play and compete in Lithuania's top-tier league as a 10th team, as DFK Dainava subsequently fixed all of the issues regarding sponsorship and stable finance. For the first time in DFK Dainava club history since re-creation in 2016, Alytus town will yet again have a men's football team competing in Lithuanian top-tier football league A Lyga. DFK Dainava started the season with -3 points as regulations and laws via the Lithuanian Football Federation. The first match for DFK Dainava in A Lyga was played on 6 March in Marijampolė against also newly promoted team FK Nevėžis, due to the city having a full sized indoor football ground and it is closest to Alytus.

In 2022, DFK Dainava were the league winners and were promoted to the 2023 A Lyga.

Turkmenistani coach Mergen Orazov was appointed on 24 June 2025.

== Recent seasons ==
Season	Level	Division	Position	Link	Movements
2016	2.	I Lyga	9.		
2017	2.	I Lyga	4.		
2018	2.	I Lyga	2.		
2019	2.	I Lyga	4.		
2020	2.	I Lyga	6.		Promoted to 2022 A Lyga
2021	1.	A Lyga	9.		Relegated to I Lyga
2022	2.	I Lyga	1.		Promoted to 2023 A Lyga
2023	1.	A Lyga	8.		
2024	1.	A Lyga	4.		
2025	1.	A Lyga	10.		Relegated to I Lyga

== Kit evolution ==
DFK Dainava	DFK Dainava
Kits
2016–2018; Traditional	2016–2018; Alternative
2019–2020; Home	2019–2020; Away
2021–present Home	2021–present Away

== Stadium ==
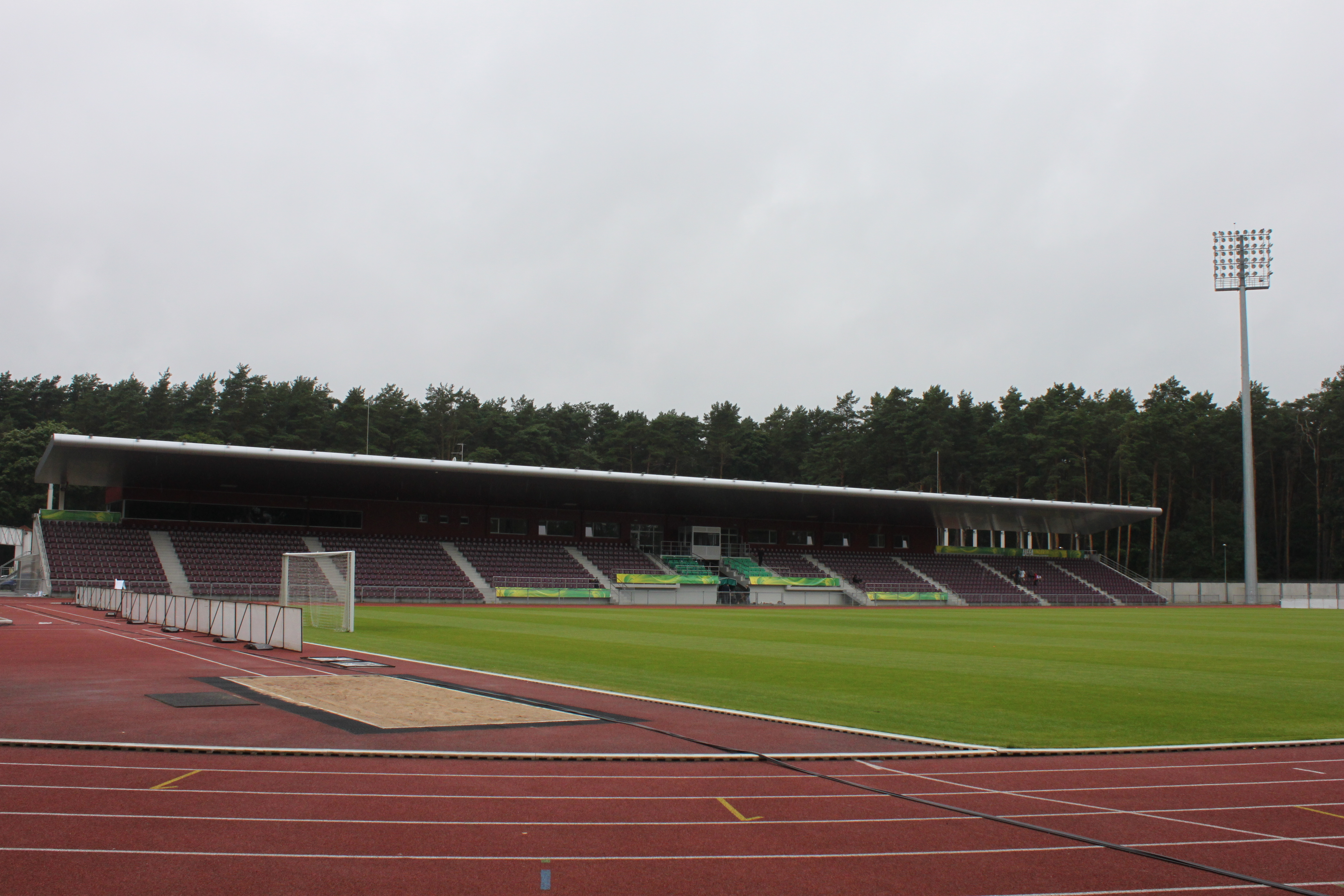
Alytus Stadium

DFK Dainava plays in the Alytus Stadium. It is a multi-use stadium in Alytus, Lithuania and holds 3,790 people. The stadium was renovated in 2010.

== Current squad ==
As of 9 April, 2026

Note: Flags indicate national team as defined under FIFA eligibility rules; some limited exceptions apply. Players may hold more than one non-FIFA nationality.

No.	Pos.	Nation	Player
3	DF	UKR	Maksym Maksymenko
4	DF	LTU	Vasaris Vasiliauskas
7	FW	GHA	Evans Appiah
8	MF	LTU	Matas Maknevičius
11	FW	UKR	Nikita Savchuk
13	DF	SEN	Cheikh Faye
14	FW	NGR	Jeremiah Chinonso
17	FW	NGR	Christopher Ellah
18	MF	UKR	Ilya Kotov
19	MF	LTU	Titas Žukauskas
20	DF	LTU	Kasparas Sacevičius
22	MF	LTU	Benas Tribušinas

No.	Pos.	Nation	Player
27	MF	LTU	Lukas Šiaudvytis
29	DF	LTU	Gustas Zabita
30	GK	UKR	Bogdan Mykytenko
33	DF	LTU	Lukas Genevičius
44	DF	LTU	Pijus Sabonis
54	MF	CIV	Mohamed Camara
67	FW	LTU	Domas Abečiūnas
77	GK	LTU	Airidas Mickevičius
78	MF	UKR	Vladyslav Shapoval
88	FW	LTU	Pijus Čepononis
98	DF	ANG	Bruno Pedro

=== Out on loan ===
Note: Flags indicate national team as defined under FIFA eligibility rules; some limited exceptions apply. Players may hold more than one non-FIFA nationality.

No.	Pos.	Nation	Player

== Managers ==
- (Lithuania) Ričardas Grigaliūnas (March – June 2016)
- (Lithuania) Darius Gvildys (June 2016 – December 2017)
- (Lithuania) Donatas Vencevičius (January – December 2018)
- (Norway) Kim Rønningstad (2019)
- (Poland) Łukasz Hass (2020)
- (Italy) Fabio Mazzone (August 2020)
- (Lithuania) Tomas Ražanauskas (April 2021)
- (Portugal) Matthew Silva (February – May 2022)
- (Belarus) Sergey Kuznetsov (May 2022 – May 2025)
- (Turkmenistan) Mergen Orazov (24 June 2025 – January 2026)
- (Poland) Mikołaj Raczyński (19 March 2026 – present)
