= FK Utenis Utena =

Lithuanian football club

- Full name: FK Utenis
- Founded: 1933
- Dissolved: 2011
- Ground: Utenis Stadium
- Capacity: 3,000
- 2011: 6th, III Lyga
Home colours	Away colours

FK Utenis Utena was a professional football club, based in Utena, Lithuania.

== Name history ==
- 1933 – Utenis Utena
- 1946 – Žalgiris Utena
- 1948 – Vienybė Utena
- 1948 – Žalgiris Utena
- 1955 – Spartakas Utena
- 1957 – Nemunas Utena
- 1965 – FK Utenis Utena

== History ==
Football has been played in Utena since 1919. The first iteration of FK Utenis was founded in 1933. After the WWII broke out, the club was shut down.

During the Lithuanian Soviet Socialist Republic period, the club was established again in 1965, and existed until late 1980s.

As Lithuania regained independence, the FK Utenis was revived once more in 1990, and existed until its bankruptcy in 2011.

The fourth iteration of the club was established in 2013, see FK Utenos Utenis.

== Participation in championships ==
=== Soviet era championships ===
Season	Tier	Position	Cup
1973 m.	II (Nemunas)	1	
1974 m.	I	24	
1977 m.	1/2 f.		
1978 m.	II (Nemunas)	1	
1979 m.	I	12	
1980 m.	I	9	
1981 m.	I	17	
1983 m.	II (Nemunas)	1	
1984 m.	I	7	
1985 m.	I	10	
1986 m.	I	13	
1987 m.	I	17	

=== Lithuanian championships ===
Season	Tier	Position	Cup
1990 m.	II (Rytai)	8	—
1991 m.	III (Rytai)	4	—
1991–1992 m.	III (Rytai)	4	—
1992–1993 m.	III (Rytai)	3	—
1993–1994 m.	III (Rytai)	5	1/16 f.
1994–1995 m.	III	8	—
1995–1996 m.	III	3	1/32 f.
1996–1997 m.	II	14	—
1997–1998 m.	III (Rytai)	3	1/16 f.
1998–1999 m.	II	15	1/16 f.
1999–2000 m.	III (Rytai)	5	—
2000–2001 m.	III (Rytai)	5	—
2001–2002 m.	II	15	—
2002–2003 m.	III (Rytai)	2	—
2003 m.	II	15	—
2004 m.	II	13	—
2005 m.	II	16	—
2006 m.	III (Pietūs)	5	—
2007–2008 m.	III (Pietūs)	12	—
2008–2009 m.	II	11	1/32 f.
2009–2010 m.	IV (Utena)	6	—
2010–2011 m.	IV (Utena)	6	—
