= FK Banga Gargždai =

Association football club

Banga Gargždai
- Full name: Futbolo klubas Banga
- Nickname: Tigrų ekipa
- Founded: 1966; 60 years ago
- Ground: Gargždai Stadium, Gargždai
- Capacity: ~2,300
- Chairman: Rimantas Mikalauskas
- Manager: David Afonso
- League: TOPLYGA
- 2026: TOPLYGA, 5th of 10
- Website: https://www.fkbanga.lt/
Home colours	Away colours

FK Banga Gargždai is a Lithuanian professional football club from the city of Gargždai.

== History ==
FK Banga was founded in 1966. During the period from 1966 to 1990, the club was in the Soviet Lithuanian football championship. From 1990, they played in the Lithuanian championship. From 1994 to 2001, they were in the top tier. After the 2001 A Lyga, they were relegated to the I Lyga.

The team earned promotion to the A Lyga, Lithuania's top football division, for the 2009 season after FBK Kaunas and Atlantas Klaipėda voluntarily withdrew their participation. Banga were also members of the A Lyga from 1994 to 2000.

In the 2019 LFF I Lyga, FK Banga finished in second position and played in the relegation/promotion match with FK Palanga. Banga won the playoff, passed the licensing process, and returned to the top division after a 5-year break. In the 2020 A Lyga, FK Banga finished in 4th position. It was the best result in FK Banga history in A Lyga.

== Achievements ==
- A Lyga
  - Fourth place (1): 2020
- Lithuanian Cup
  - Winners (1): 2024
  - Runners-up (3): 2011, 2014, 2019
- Supercup
  - Runners-up (1): 2025

== Recent seasons ==
Season	Level	League	Place	Web	Notes
2004	3.	II lyga (West)	3.		
2005	3.	II lyga (West)	5.		▲ Promoted to Pirma lyga
2006	2.	Pirma lyga	12.		
2007	2.	Pirma lyga	6.		
2008	2.	Pirma lyga	4.		▲ Promoted to A lyga
2009	1.	A lyga	6.		
2010	1.	A lyga	6.		
2011	1.	A lyga	6.		
2012	1.	A lyga	6.		
2013	1.	A lyga	6.		
2014	1.	A lyga	9.		▼ Relegated to Pirma lyga
2015	2.	Pirma lyga	3.		
2016	2.	Pirma lyga	6.		
2017	2.	Pirma lyga	2.		
2018	2.	Pirma lyga	3.		
2019	2.	Pirma lyga	2.		▲ Promotion to A lyga
2020	1.	A lyga	4.		
2021	1.	A lyga	7.		
2022	1.	A lyga	8.		
2023	1.	A lyga	6.		
2024	1.	A lyga	5.		
2025	1.	A lyga	8.		

== UEFA club competition record ==
Source: uefa.com
Last updated: 31 July 2025

Competition	Matches	W	D	L	GF	GA
UEFA Europa League	6	0	1	5	0	18
Total	5	0	1	5	0	18

=== Matches ===
Season	Competition	Round	Club	1st Leg	2nd Leg	Aggregate
2011–12	UEFA Europa League	1Q	(Azerbaijan) Qarabağ	0–4	0–3	0–7
2014–15	UEFA Europa League	1Q	(Republic of Ireland) Sligo Rovers	0–0	0–4	0–4
2025–26	UEFA Conference League	2Q	(Norway) Rosenborg	0–5	0–2	0–7

== Current squad ==
As of 5 September 2026

Note: Flags indicate national team as defined under FIFA eligibility rules; some limited exceptions apply. Players may hold more than one non-FIFA nationality.

No.	Pos.	Nation	Player
1	GK	LTU	Armantas Vitkauskas
3	DF	LTU	Deividas Malžinskas
6	DF	GBS	Simão Júnior
7	MF	LTU	Dovydas Norvilas
9	FW	SUI	Aaron Appiah
10	MF	LTU	Vaidas Magdušauskas
11	MF	LTU	Rokas Filipavičius
12	GK	LTU	Lukas Grinkevičius
13	DF	LTU	Natanas Žebrauskas
14	GK	UKR	Volodymyr Krynskyi
17	MF	LTU	Maksim Andrejev
19	DF	LTU	Valdas Antužis

No.	Pos.	Nation	Player
20	DF	LTU	Aleksandras Levšin
22	MF	LTU	Matas Ambrazaitis
27	DF	GER	Ricardo Henning
28	MF	LTU	Deividas Lukas
30	MF	GBS	Umaro Cande
44	MF	LTU	Domantas Vaičekauskas
45	MF	JPN	Misaki Sato
51	DF	BRA	Cadu Galvao
55	MF	NGR	Sheriff Mohammed
77	FW	LTU	Ignas Venckus
99	MF	NGR	Aaron Olugbogi

== Kit evolution ==
- Kits at home: orange kits, shorts and socks with darkblue signs.

2007	2011	2018	2019	2021

- Away kits: dark blue kits, shorts and socks with orange signs.

2007	2011	2018	2019	2021

== Managers ==
- (Lithuania) Fiodoras Finkelis (19??–77)
- (Lithuania) Leonardas Lukavičius (1990–95)
- (Italy) Fabio Lopez (2008)
- (Lithuania) Valdas Ivanauskas (2008–09)
- (Lithuania) Vytautas Jančiauskas (2009–10)
- (Lithuania) Arminas Narbekovas (16 December 2009 – 1 January 2012)
- (Lithuania) Vaidas Žutautas (6 January 2012–2013)
- (Lithuania) Vaidas Žutautas (2013–2014)
- (Russia) Maksim Tishchenko (2014–2015)
- (Lithuania) Vaidas Žutautas (2015–2016)
- (Lithuania) Tomas Tamošauskas (2017 – 3 June 2021)
- (Portugal) David Afonso, (from 3 June 2021)
