= 2000–01 Lithuanian Football Cup =

Tournament details
- Country: Lithuania

Final positions
- Champions: FK Atlantas
- Runners-up: FK Žalgiris

The Lithuanian Football Cup 2000–01 was the 12th season of the Lithuanian annual football tournament. The competition started on 18 March 2000 with the first round games, and ended on 19 May 2001 with the final. The defending champions were FK Ekranas.

== First round ==
Team 1	Score	Team 2
18 March 2000
Kauno Jėgeriai	0–3	FK Žalgiris
Interas Visaginas	2–4 (a.e.t.)	FK Inkaras Kaunas
KS Polonia Vilnius	0–2	FK Ekranas
DFK Dainava Alytus	0–3	FK Atlantas
Laisvė Šilutė	1–0	FK Banga Gargždai
FK Geležinis Vilkas	1–2	FBK Kaunas
Pieno Cechas Kalvarija	0–2	FK Nevėžis
FK Tauras Tauragė	1–4	FK Kareda Kaunas

== Quarter finals ==
=== First legs ===
20 September 2000

FK Ekranas	1–2	FK Nevėžis
Baltušnikas 28'		Mordasas 74', 78'

20 September 2000

FK Atlantas	0–0	FK Kareda Kaunas

20 September 2000

FK Žalgiris	4–0	FK Inkaras Kaunas
A. Steško 3'; Saulėnas 12'; I. Steško 63' (pen.); Vasiliauskas 86'

20 September 2000

FBK Kaunas	6–0	FK Banga Gargždai
Bezykornovas 16'; Juodeikis 27'; Puotkalis 44'; Velička 52'; Kurskis 60' (pen.); Žuta 65'

=== Second legs ===
25 October 2000

FK Nevėžis	1–0	FK Ekranas
Mordasas 12'

FK Nevėžis won 3–1 on aggregate

18 October 2000

FK Kareda Kaunas	1–2	FK Atlantas
Puotkalis 83'		Veseljevas 47'; Takenaka 66'

FK Atlantas won 2–1 on aggregate

18 October 2000

FK Inkaras Kaunas	0–1	FK Žalgiris
		Saulėnas 3'

FK Žalgiris won 5–0 on aggregate

18 October 2000

FK Banga Gargždai	1–7	FBK Kaunas
Petkevicius 77'		Barasa 14', 70'; Kurskis 69' (pen.), 80' (pen.); Prochorenkov 74'; Žuta 82'; Danilicevas 88'

FBK Kaunas won 13–1 on aggregate

== Semifinals ==
=== First legs ===
11 April 2001

FK Nevėžis	1–3	FK Žalgiris
Butkus 70' (pen.)		Vilėniškis 24', 90'; Vasiliauskas 60'

11 April 2001

FK Atlantas	0–0	FBK Kaunas

=== Second legs ===
2 May 2001

FK Žalgiris	3–0	FK Nevėžis
Veikutis 5'; Shcherbin 54'; Ringys 72'

FK Žalgiris won 6–1 on aggregate

2 May 2001

FBK Kaunas	2–2	FK Atlantas
Danilicevas 12'; Pocius 76'		Gedgaudas 53' (pen.); Karalius 89'

2–2 on aggregate, FK Atlantas win on away goals

== Final ==
19 May 2001

FK Atlantas	1–0	FK Žalgiris
Akinfenwa 18'

Aukštaitija Stadium, Panevėžys
Attendance: 600
Referee: Gercas Žakas
