= Stephen Ademolu =

Canadian soccer player (born 1982)

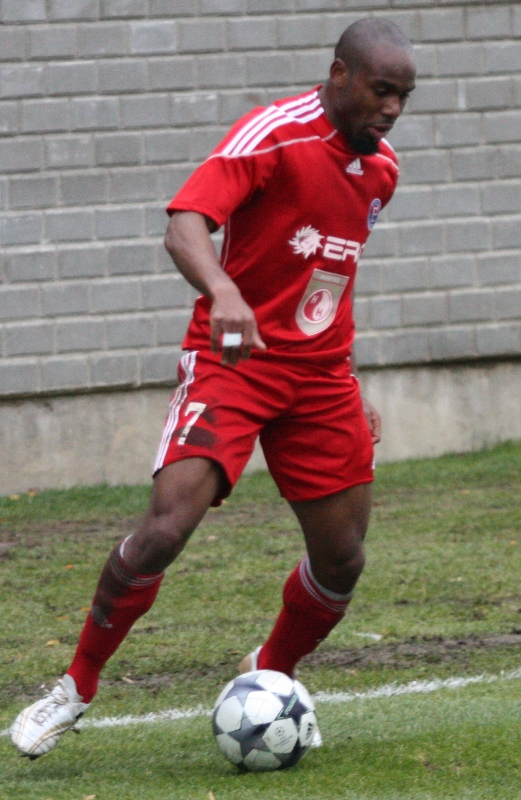
- Ademolu with Ekranas in 2009

Personal information
- Date of birth: November 20, 1982 (age 43)
- Place of birth: Windsor, Ontario, Canada
- Height: 1.78 m (5 ft 10 in)
- Position: Striker

Youth career
- Windsor FC Nationals

College career
Years	Team	Apps	(Gls)
2001	UNC Pembroke Braves	9	(11)
2002–2003	Cleveland State Vikings	36	(23)

Senior career*
Years	Team	Apps	(Gls)
2004–2005	Trelleborg	30	(12)
2005–2007	Tromsø	42	(7)
2008	Løv-Ham	23	(12)
2008–2011	Ekranas	48	(13)
2011	Windsor Stars	7	(8)
2012	Atlanta Silverbacks	0	(0)
2012–2015	Windsor Stars	12	(11)
2015	Detroit City		
2017	Windsor TFC Stars	12	(5)
2017–2018	Oakville Blue Devils	17	(11)
2019–2022	WSC Fury	5	(8)

International career^{‡}
2004	Canada U23	2	(0)
2005–2010	Canada	5	(0)
- * Club domestic league appearances and goals as of January 23, 2024 ‡ National team caps and goals as of June 24, 2023

Stephen Olasumbo Ademolu (born November 20, 1982) is a former Canadian soccer player and current coach/trainer.

== Club career ==
=== Early career ===
Ademolu played college soccer at the University of North Carolina at Pembroke during his first year and at Cleveland State University during his second and third.

At the University of North Carolina at Pembroke, he became the school's top scorer with twelve goals and six assists. Ademolu was also named 2001 School's Top Male Athlete and Peach Belt Conference Player of the Year for the first time in the school's history.

At Cleveland State University, during his sophomore year, Ademolu was named Newcomer of the Year, first team All-Horizon League, first team NSCAA All-Ohio and third team All-Great Lakes Region. He was also top scorer with eleven goals and six assists. In his junior year, he was named Horizon League Player of the Year, third-team All-Ohio, 16th in the nation in goals per game, 28th in the country in points per game, he led his CSU Team and the Horizon League with twelve goals and six assists and tied a school record with eight points on three goals and two assists against UIC in one game.

During his youth ages, Ademolu played for the Windsor FC Nationals scoring a total of 120 goals in the Ontario Youth Soccer League, also winning Top Goal Scorer of the Year and MVP in 1996–97. Ademolu led the Windsor FC Nationals to back to back Ontario Cups.

=== Trellborg ===
In 2005, Ademolu signed for Trelleborgs FF in Sweden, he came in halfway through the season before getting relegated but the highlight for Ademolu was scoring his first goal in a derby game against Malmö FF. He was named team MVP for the 2005 season. In 2006, he played in the Swedish 2nd Division and scored seven goals before being sold to Tromsø IL.

=== Tromsø ===
Ademolu spent two-and-a-half seasons at Tromsø where he made history when he scored a crucial goal in a 2005–06 UEFA Cup first round second leg encounter against Galatasaray at the Ali Sami Yen Stadium in Istanbul which helped send Tromsø into the 2005–06 UEFA Cup group stage where they would face off against Strasbourg, Roma, Basel and Red Star Belgrade.

=== Løv-Ham ===
After two-and-a-half seasons at Tromsø, Ademolu left to get more playing time in 2008 with Løv-Ham in the 1. divisjon. Ademolu scored twelve goals and had seven assists in 23 games, before moving on to Lithuania where he signed for FK Ekranas for two years in 2009.

=== Ekranas ===
With Ekranas, Ademolu was named in his first year playing as one of the top five players in the country. Ekranas went on to win the 2009 A Lyga Championship. Ademolu then went on to help his team win a double (the 2010 A Lyga Championship and the 2009–10 Lithuanian Football Cup). During his time at Ekranas, Ademolu played in 2009 Champions League qualifying matches where Ekranas lost 6–4 on aggregate against Baku and the following year narrowly lost to Finnish side Helsinki by a score of 2–1 on aggregate.

=== Windsor Stars ===
Ademolu returned to Canada in 2011 during a brief stint with Canadian Soccer League side Windsor Stars. In January 2012, he signed with the Atlanta Silverbacks of the North American Soccer League but did not make any appearances due to complications with the American system of applying for a visa.

== International career ==
During his college years, he was called up to the Canadian Olympic team for the 2004 CONCACAF Men's Pre-Olympic Tournament.

He made his senior debut in a friendly match for Canada in November 2005 against Luxembourg. On January 22, 2006, he featured in a friendly at Torero Stadium against the United States. In January 2010, he was called up for a friendly against Jamaica in which he started. Ademolu was called up to play against Argentina on May 24, 2010, before playing Venezuela five days later.

== Coaching career ==
In addition to running the Ademolu Soccer Academy, Ademolu has also worked as the University of Windsor men's and women's assistant coach along with local Windsor clubs.

== Personal life ==
Ademolu is of Jamaican and Nigerian descent. Ademolu has seven brothers and one sister. His twin brother O'Nicholas also played for the Cleveland State Vikings. His cousin Michael Carter played football in the Canadian Football League.

In recent years, Ademolu has featured as a sports columnist for the Urban Book Circle and for RedNation Online.

== Bibliography ==
- The Best Kept Secret – Ademolu, Stephen Olasumbo (2025). The Best Kept Secret: The Journey, Failures, Growth, and Lessons of a Soccer Player, and How He Reached His Full Potential. Altona: Friesen Press. ISBN 978-1-03-919385-7.

== Honours ==
Ekranas

- A Lyga: 2009, 2010
- Lithuanian Football Cup: 2010
- Lithuanian Supercup: 2010

Oakville Blue Devils

- League1 Ontario: 2017

Individual

- League1 Ontario Second Team All Star: 2017

== Notes ==
1. The 2010 Lithuanian Supercup was not played as Ekranas won both the league and the cup that year. Nevertheless, they were awarded the title of Supercup Champion.
