= Valdas Trakys =

Lithuanian footballer and coach

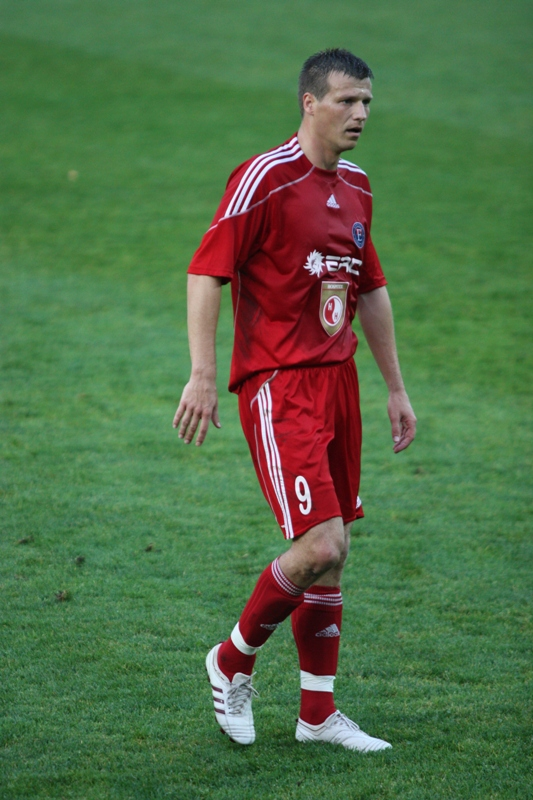

Personal information
- Date of birth: 20 March 1979 (age 47)
- Place of birth: Kretinga, Lithuanian SSR, USSR
- Height: 1.88 m (6 ft 2 in)
- Position: Striker

Team information
- Current team: Neptūnas (manager)

Senior career*
Years	Team	Apps	(Gls)
1997–2000	FBK Kaunas	49	(25)
2000–2001	FC Torpedo Moscow	21	(2)
2000	FC Torpedo-2 Moscow	6	(1)
2001	FC Khimki	1	(0)
2002–2003	FH Hafnarfjörður	6	(2)
2003–2004	SpVgg Greuther Fürth	7	(1)
2004	VfL Osnabrück	12	(0)
2004–2005	FC Kuban Krasnodar	4	(0)
2005	FK Atlantas	17	(1)
2005	FC Oryol	18	(1)
2006	FK Atlantas	32	(4)
2006–2007	FC Inter Baku	12	(3)
2008–2010	FK Ekranas	51	(26)
2010–2011	Panserraikos	9	(1)
2011	Hibernian	9	(0)
2012	Anagennisi Epanomi F.C.	14	(1)
2012–2013	Kruoja Pakruojis	10	(0)
2013	FK Atlantas	10	(0)

International career
1998–2009	Lithuania	11	(2)

Managerial career
- 2014–2018: Palanga
- 2019–2021: Minija
- 2022–: Neptūnas
- * Club domestic league appearances and goals

Valdas Trakys (born 20 March 1979) is a Lithuanian football coach and a former player. He is the manager of Neptūnas.

== Playing career ==
Trakys started his professional career in 1995 with FK Panerys Vilnius in his native Lithuania. He played for FC Harelbeke and FBK Kaunas before moving to Russia to play for Torpedo Moscow. After a year with FC Khimki, Trakys left Russia to play for FH Hafnarfjörður in Iceland. Trakys then moved to Germany, playing for Greuther Fürth.

Since 2004, Trakys has played in Russia, Lithuania, Azerbaijan and Greece. He was top scorer in the Lithuanian A Lyga in the 2009 season. In January 2010, he signed a six-month contract with Greek Beta Ethniki side Panserraikos. Trakys left Panserraikos after they breached his contract.

Trakys then had a trial spell with Scottish Premier League club Hibernian, and signed on 14 September. He made his first starting appearance for Hibs in a 3–0 win against Rangers at Ibrox on 10 November 2010, but was informed by manager Colin Calderwood in April 2011 that his contract would not be renewed.

== Career statistics ==
As of 26 February 2014

Club performance			League		Cup		Continental		Total	
Season	Club	League	Apps	Goals	Apps	Goals	Apps	Goals	Apps	Goals
2006–07	Inter Baku	Azerbaijan Top League	12	3		1	-		12	4
2008	Ekranas	A Lyga	24	6			-		24	6
2009	Ekranas	A Lyga	27	20			2	1	29	21
2009–10	Panserraikos	Beta Ethniki	12	1			-		12	1
2010–11	Hibernian	Scottish Premier League	9	0	1	0	-		10	0
2011–12	Panserraikos	Football League	0	0	0	0	-		0	0
2011–12	Anagennisi Epanomi	Football League	15	1	1	0	-		16	1
2012	Kruoja Pakruojis	A Lyga	10	0	2	0	-		12	0
2013	Atlantas	A Lyga	10	0	0	0	-		10	0
Total	Lithuania		71	26	2	0	2	1	75	27
Total	Azerbaijan		12	3		1	-		12	4
Total	Greece		27	2	1		-		28	2
Total	Scotland		9	0	1	0	-		10	0
Career total			119	31	4	1	2	1	125	33

=== International goals ===
Scores and results list Lithuania's goal tally first.

#	Date	Venue	Opponent	Score	Result	Competition
1	6 February 2000	Larnaca, Cyprus	Latvia	1–1	2–1	Friendly match
2	4 July 2001	Riga, Latvia	Estonia	4–2	5–2	2001 Baltic Cup

== Coaching career ==
From 2014 was head coach of FK Palanga. In 2017 season with FK Palanga won Lithuanian First League and team was promoted to 2018 A Lyga.

In January 2019 he became head coach of Minija.

In February 2019 became Lithuanian U-19 head coach.
