= 2006 A Lyga =

Annual soccer tournament

A Lyga
- Season: 2006
- Dates: 15 April-12 November
- Champions: FBK Kaunas
- Relegated: FK Silute; FK Nevezis
- UEFA Champions League: FBK Kaunas
- UEFA Cup: FK Ekranas; FK Suduva
- UEFA Intertoto Cup: FK Vetra
- Top goalscorer: (Ukraine) Serhiy Kuznetsov (18 goals)

The Lithuanian A Lyga 2006 was the 17th season of top-tier football in Lithuania. The season started on 15 April 2006 and ended on 12 November 2006. 10 teams participated with FBK Kaunas winning the championship.

== League standings ==
Pos	Team	Pld	W	D	L	GF	GA	GD	Pts	Qualification or relegation
1	FBK Kaunas (C)	36	28	4	4	85	30	+55	88	Qualification to Champions League first qualifying round
2	Ekranas	36	20	7	9	63	39	+24	67	Qualification to UEFA Cup first qualifying round
3	Vėtra	36	17	10	9	49	35	+14	61	Qualification to Intertoto Cup first round
4	Žalgiris	36	14	12	10	52	39	+13	54	
5	Sūduva	36	15	8	13	48	44	+4	53	Qualification to UEFA Cup first qualifying round
6	Atlantas	36	14	10	12	46	41	+5	52	
7	Vilnius	36	11	14	11	46	40	+6	47	
8	Šiauliai	36	10	11	15	42	46	−4	41	
9	Šilutė (R)	36	5	3	28	25	77	−52	18	Qualification to Relegation play-offs
10	Nevėžis (R)	36	4	5	27	35	100	−65	17	Relegation to 1 Lyga

Source: www2.omnitel.net
(C) Champions; (R) Relegated

== Results ==
=== First half of season ===
Home \ Away	ATL	EKR	FBK	NEV	SŪD	ŠIA	ŠIL	VĖT	VIL	ŽAL
Atlantas		2–0	1–2	1–1	3–0	1–0	2–1	2–1	0–0	0–0
Ekranas	0–0		1–2	5–1	0–0	2–0	0–0	4–1	1–1	1–0
FBK Kaunas	2–1	0–1		2–0	2–0	3–0	6–1	4–0	3–2	2–1
Nevėžis	2–3	0–4	1–3		0–2	0–3	2–1	3–2	1–5	1–5
Sūduva	1–0	1–4	1–3	3–0		1–1	1–0	1–1	1–1	3–1
Šiauliai	3–1	4–1	1–2	5–0	2–1		0–1	0–0	1–1	0–0
Šilutė	1–2	1–3	0–3	1–2	0–3	1–1		0–4	0–1	0–1
Vėtra	2–2	2–0	1–4	2–0	1–0	1–1	1–1		1–0	0–1
Vilnius	1–4	0–0	2–2	2–0	0–0	0–1	2–1	0–0		0–3
Žalgiris	0–1	0–2	1–2	2–1	0–0	2–3	0–1	1–1	1–1	

Legend: Blue = home team win; Yellow = draw; Red = away team win.

=== Second half of season ===
Home \ Away	ATL	EKR	FBK	NEV	SŪD	ŠIA	ŠIL	VĖT	VIL	ŽAL
Atlantas		1–3	2–1	2–0	0–1	1–1	4–1	0–0	1–2	2–2
Ekranas	3–1		0–1	1–1	0–1	2–0	3–1	1–0	2–0	4–3
FBK Kaunas	1–1	4–0		1–1	2–0	2–0	4–0	1–2	2–1	2–2
Nevėžis	0–1	3–6	2–6		1–3	2–5	3–4	0–2	2–2	1–4
Sūduva	3–1	1–3	0–3	2–0		2–0	2–0	1–2	2–1	2–3
Šiauliai	0–0	1–3	3–0	0–0	1–1		2–1	0–4	0–2	0–2
Šilutė	1–0	0–1	0–3	1–2	1–4	1–0		1–2	1–3	0–2
Vėtra	2–1	2–0	0–1	1–0	2–1	2–1	5–1		1–0	0–1
Vilnius	0–1	2–0	1–3	5–0	5–3	1–1	1–0	0–0		0–0
Žalgiris	3–1	2–2	0–1	3–2	0–0	2–1	2–0	1–1	1–1	

Legend: Blue = home team win; Yellow = draw; Red = away team win.

== Relegation play-off ==
Team 1	Agg.	Team 2	1st leg	2nd leg
Interas-AE	2–2 (4–3 p)	Šilutė	1–0	1–2

== Top goalscorers ==
Pos.	Player	Club	Goals
1	(Ukraine) Serhiy Kuznetsov	Vėtra	18
2	(Lithuania) Mantas Savėnas	Ekranas	16
2	(Ukraine) Ilya Halyuza	Šiauliai	16
4	(Lithuania) Andrius Velička	FBK Kaunas	14
4	(Lithuania) Ričardas Beniušis	FBK Kaunas	14
6	(Lithuania) Povilas Lukšys	Ekranas	13
6	(Ukraine) Maksim Morozov	Atlantas	13
6	(Lithuania) Vitalis Stankevičius	Nevėžis	13
6	(Bosnia and Herzegovina) Edin Pehlić	FBK Kaunas	13
10	(Lithuania) Vitalijus Kavaliauskas	Ekranas	12

== See also ==
- 2006 LFF Lyga
