= Skinderis =

Skinderis is a surname. Notable people with the surname include:

- Marius Skinderis (born 1974), Lithuanian footballer
- Simas Skinderis (born 1981), Lithuanian footballer
