= Dominykas Galkevičius =

Lithuanian footballer and coach

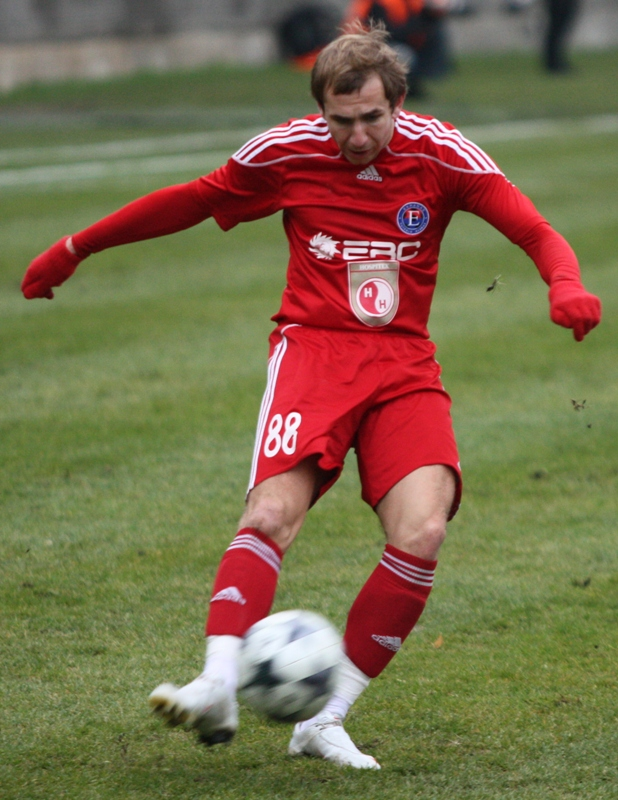

Personal information
- Date of birth: 16 October 1986 (age 40)
- Place of birth: Jonava, Lithuanian SSR
- Height: 1.78 m (5 ft 10 in)
- Position: Midfielder

Team information
- Current team: Lithuania U17 (head coach)

Senior career*
Years	Team	Apps	(Gls)
2004	Lietava Jonava		
2004	Ekranas-2 Panevėžys	5	(1)
2005–2010	Ekranas Panevėžys	117	(21)
2011–2012	Zagłębie Lubin	5	(1)
2012	Belshina Bobruisk	7	(0)
2013	Daugava Rīga	5	(0)
2013	Naftan Novopolotsk	4	(0)
2014	Granitas Klaipėda	17	(4)
2015	Kruoja Pakruojis	5	(0)
2015	Atlantas Klaipėda	7	(0)
2016	Lietava Jonava	27	(7)
2017	Sūduva Marijampolė	2	(0)
2017–2018	Stumbras	30	(2)
2019	Kauno Žalgiris	20	(2)

International career
2010–2011	Lithuania	7	(0)

Managerial career
- 2020–2022: Kauno Žalgiris B
- 2025: Lithuania U15
- 2026–: Lithuania U17
- * Club domestic league appearances and goals

Dominykas Galkevičius (born 16 October 1986) is a Lithuanian professional football manager and former player who played as a midfielder. He is currently the head coach of the Lithuania national under-17 team.

== Club career ==
In November 2010, Galkevičius came on trial to Serbian side Red Star Belgrade. In 2011, he joined Zagłębie Lubin on a two-and-a-half-year contract. In January 2013, Galkevičius joined the Latvian Higher League club Daugava Rīga. He left the club in September 2013, joining the Belarusian Premier League club Naftan Novopolotsk.

From 2017 to 2018, he played for Stumbras.

In December 2018, he moved to Kauno Žalgiris.

== International career ==
On 25 May 2010, Galkevičius made his international debut against Ukraine in Kharkiv.

== Coaching career ==
He decided to retire at the end of 2019 and was hired as head coach for Kauno Žalgiris' B-team.

== Honours ==
Ekranas

- A Lyga: 2005, 2008, 2009, 2010
- Lithuanian Cup: 2009–10

Sūduva

- A Lyga: 2017
