= 2017 FK Nevėžis season =

FC Nevėžis
2017 season
- Director: Saulius Skibiniauskas
- Head Coach: Marius Skinderis
- Stadium: Kėdainiai Stadium
- First League: 7th (45 points)
- Top goalscorer: Aretas Gėgžna (9); Andrei Liasiuk (9)
- Biggest win: 4–0 v Utenis B (9 Jun 2017)
- Biggest defeat: 0–3 v Palanga (15 Apr 2017)
Home colours	Away colours

In the 2017 season, Nevėžis finished seventh amongst 15 teams in the Lithuanian First League. The season ran from 1 April 2017 to 21 October 2017.

== Players ==
Squad No.	Name	Nat.	Position(s)	Date of Birth (Age)	Apps	Goals
Goalkeepers
	Gytis Jakubaitis	(Lithuania)	GK	9 July 1998 (age 27)	1	0
	Simas Skinderis	(Lithuania)	GK	1 January 1970 (age 56)	28	0
Defenders
15	Darius Cibulskas	(Lithuania)	DF	23 May 1988 (age 38)	10	0
6	Rolandas Slepakovas	(Lithuania)	DF	29 August 1986 (age 39)	25	0
	Arnoldas Trakšelis	(Lithuania)	DF	10 October 1994 (age 31)	15	0
5	Evaldas Petrėnas	(Lithuania)	DF	15 August 1996 (age 29)	2	0
	Deividas Skaržauskas	(Lithuania)	DF	5 February 1999 (age 27)	3	0
	Viktor Dovbyš	(Ukraine)	DF	13 October 1985 (age 40)	13	0
Midfielders
21	Rimvydas Lipnevičius	(Lithuania)	MF	10 December 1992 (age 33)	27	4
	Vladislav Chernyakov	(Lithuania)	MF	15 March 1997 (age 29)	19	0
17	Aretas Gėgžna	(Lithuania)	MF	29 November 1988 (age 37)	22	9
	Nerijus Kestenis	(Lithuania)	MF	18 May 1982 (age 44)	15	0
11	Rokas Mikuckis	(Lithuania)	MF	1 January 1997 (age 29)	11	3
24	Šarūnas Činikas	(Lithuania)	MF	18 September 1997 (age 28)	14	1
	Tomas Rakašius	(Lithuania)	MF	28 January 1998 (age 28)	13	2
	Deividas Gražys	(Lithuania)	MF	16 April 1986 (age 40)	24	3
	Tadas Paulikas	(Lithuania)	MF	1 April 1999 (age 27)	14	0
	Andrei Liasiuk	(Belarus)	MF	14 April 1984 (age 42)	27	9
	Jonas Supronas	(Lithuania)	MF	25 August 2000 (age 25)	5	0
	Ugnius Lekečinskas	(Lithuania)	MF	10 August 2000 (age 25)	2	0
	Erikas Skripkinas	(Lithuania)	MF	7 January 1995 (age 31)	8	5
	Tautvydas Amalas	(Lithuania)	MF	18 April 2000 (age 26)	1	0
	Martynas Vasiliauskas	(Lithuania)	MF	19 November 1997 (age 28)	16	1
	Jevgenij Moroz	(Lithuania)	MF	20 January 1990 (age 36)	12	1
	Antonio Andrade Belo	(Portugal)	MF	14 August 1998 (age 27)	8	1
Forwards
	Evaldas Kugys	(Lithuania)	ST	15 August 1993 (age 32)	24	3
	Vilius Giedraitis	(Lithuania)	ST	12 March 1998 (age 28)	7	0
	Deividas Mikalauskas	(Lithuania)	ST	12 February 1999 (age 27)	10	0
