= Nevėžis (disambiguation) =

Nevėžis may refer to:

- Nevėžis, a river in Lithuania
- BC Nevėžis, a basketball team from Kėdainiai, Lithuania
- FK Nevėžis, a football team from Kėdainiai, Lithuania
