= Tadas Labukas =

Lithuanian footballer

Personal information
- Date of birth: 10 January 1984 (age 42)
- Place of birth: Alytus, Lithuania
- Height: 1.82 m (6 ft 0 in)
- Position: Forward

Team information
- Current team: Sakuona Plikiai

Senior career*
| Years | Team | Apps | (Gls) |
| 2001–2002 | Atlantas | 35 | (12) |
| 2003–2004 | Dynamo Moscow II | 28 | (3) |
| 2004 | Atlantas | 17 | (1) |
| 2004–2006 | Vyzas | 15 | (7) |
| 2006–2007 | Žalgiris | 34 | (10) |
| 2007–2009 | Oțelul Galați | 36 | (4) |
| 2008–2009 | → Inter Baku (loan) | 7 | (0) |
| 2009–2011 | Arka Gdynia | 56 | (10) |
| 2011 | Brann | 11 | (0) |
| 2012 | Skonto Riga | 28 | (11) |
| 2013–2014 | Torpedo Moscow | 10 | (0) |
| 2014–2015 | Trakai | 32 | (10) |
| 2015–2016 | Miedź Legnica | 47 | (7) |
| 2016–2017 | Trakai | 19 | (2) |
| 2017–2019 | Atlantas | 64 | (11) |
| 2020 | Atmosfera | 11 | (3) |
| 2021–2022 | Gintaras | | |
| 2022– | Sakuona Plikiai | | |

International career
| 2002 | Lithuania U19 | | |
| 2004–2006 | Lithuania U21 | 3 | (0) |
| 2006–2012 | Lithuania | 18 | (0) |
- * Club domestic league appearances and goals as of 9 January 2024

Tadas Labukas (born 10 January 1984) is a Lithuanian professional footballer who plays as a forward for Sakuona Plikiai.

== Career ==
Labukas played for Arka Gdynia, having signed a two-year contract in July 2009. He was released from Arka Gdynia on 30 June 2011. But, after going on a brief trial, he joined Brann on a short-term contract which could be extended. Before the start of the 2012 season Labukas joined the Latvian Higher League club Skonto Riga. He scored 11 goals in 28 league matches for his club, sharing the club's top scorer's honor with Valērijs Šabala. In January 2013 Labukas left Riga, joining the Russian First Division club Torpedo Moscow. In February 2014, he left Russia to join new A Lyga club FK Trakai. After a successful season Labukas signed for Polish I liga club Miedź Legnica, but after the season ended chose to return to Lithuania and help Trakai. In January 2017 Labukas decided to extend his contract with Lithuanian vice-champions, but it was terminated during the season.

== Career statistics ==
Appearances and goals by club, season and competition
| Season | Club | League | | | Cup | | Europe | | Total | |
| Season | Club | Division | Apps | Goals | Apps | Goals | Apps | Goals | Apps | Goals |
|---|---|---|---|---|---|---|---|---|---|---|
| Inter Baku (loan) | 2008–09 | Azerbaijan Premier League | 7 | 0 | | | 0 | 0 | 7 | 0 |
| Brann | 2011 | Tippeligaen | 11 | 0 | 2 | 0 | – | | 13 | 0 |
| Skonto Riga | 2012 | Virslīga | 28 | 11 | 2 | 0 | 2 | 0 | 32 | 11 |
| Career total | | | 39 | 11 | 4 | 0 | 2 | 0 | 45 | 11 |
