= 2013 LFF I Lyga =

I Lyga
- Season: 2013
- Champions: Klaipėdos Granitas
- Promoted: Klaipėdos Granitas; FK Trakai
- Relegated: Polonija
- Matches: 162
- Top goalscorer: Aivaras Lyberis; Edgaras Mastianica (18 goals)

The 2013 I Lyga (also known as LFF I Lyga) was the 24th season of the I Lyga, the second-tier association football league of Lithuania. The season started on 8 April 2013 and ended on 24 September 2013.

== Changes from 2013 ==
The league changed its number of teams, increasing it from 10 teams in 2012 I Lyga to 12 teams in 2013. Two teams of 2012 resigned – FK Granitas Vilnius and NFA Kaunas (replaced by FM Spyris Kaunas), and another two were relegated – FK Venta Kuršėnai and FK Kėdainiai. From LFF II lyga were admitted 5 teams – 3 from zone South (FK Žalgiris-3 Vilnius, FK Šilas Kazlų Rūda and FM Spyris Kaunas) and 2 from zone West (FK Lokomotyvas Radviliškis and FK Klaipėdos Granitas). A newly created team of FK Baltija Panevėžys was also allowed to start at I lyga in 2013.

== Stadia and locations ==
Location of teams in the 2013 LFF I lyga

Club	Location	Stadium	2012 I Lyga
FK Baltija Panevėžys	Panevėžys	Panevėžio futbolo akademijos stadionas	no league
FK Klaipėdos Granitas	Klaipėda	Klaipėdos m. centrinis stadionas	4th (LFF 2 lyga - West)
FK Lietava Jonava	Jonava	Jonavos centrinis stadionas	1st
FK Lokomotyvas Radviliškis	Radviliškis	Panevėžio futbolo akademijos stadionas, Panevėžys	1st (LFF 2 lyga - West)
FK Nevėžis Kėdainiai	Kėdainiai	Kėdainių miesto stadionas	2nd
FK Palanga	Palanga	Palangos centrinis miesto stadionas	8th
FK Polonija Vilnius	Vilnius	Vingio parko stadionas	5th
FK Šilas Kazlų Rūda	Kazlų Rūda	Kazlų Rūdos stadionas	4th (LFF 2 lyga - South)
FK Šilutė	Šilutė	Šilutės miesto stadionas	7th
FM Spyris Kaunas	Kaunas	Nacionalinės futbolo akademijos stadionas	5th (LFF 2 lyga - South)
FK Trakai	Trakai	Trakų naujasis stadionas	4th
FK Žalgiris-3 Vilnius	Vilnius	Vilniaus LFF stadionas	3rd (LFF 2 lyga - South)

== Regular season ==
Pos	Team	Pld	W	D	L	GF	GA	GD	Pts	Qualification
1	Klaipėdos Granitas (Note: 3 points were deducted for a failure to fulfill licensing requirements)	22	16	6	0	57	21	+36	51	Qualification to the Promotion round
2	Nevėžis	22	12	6	4	46	23	+23	42	Qualification to the Promotion round
3	Trakai	22	12	3	7	39	19	+20	39	Qualification to the Promotion round
4	Šilas	22	11	5	6	39	29	+10	38	Qualification to the Promotion round
5	Spyris	22	11	3	8	50	33	+17	36	Qualification to the Promotion round
6	Lietava	22	10	5	7	38	25	+13	35	Qualification to the Promotion round
7	Lokomotyvas	22	10	4	8	39	36	+3	34	Qualification to the Relegation round
8	Žalgiris-3	22	7	4	11	29	32	−3	25	Qualification to the Relegation round
9	Šilutė	22	6	5	11	13	28	−15	23	Qualification to the Relegation round
10	Baltija	22	5	3	14	27	49	−22	18	Qualification to the Relegation round
11	Polonija	22	6	3	13	27	60	−33	18	Qualification to the Relegation round
12	Palanga (Note: 6 points were deducted for a failure to fulfill licensing requirements)	22	1	3	18	17	66	−49	0	Qualification to the Relegation round

== Promotion play-offs ==
Semi-finals: Syris 2-3(a.e.t.) Kaunas

Nevėžis 0-1 Trakai

Final: Kaunas 0-0 (a.e.t.), 1-3p Trakai

== Top goalscorers ==
As of 20 August 2013.

Pos.	Player	Club	Goals
1	(Lithuania) Aivaras Lyberis	FK Nevėžis Kėdainiai	15
2	(Lithuania) Aretas Gėgžna	FK Nevėžis Kėdainiai	9
2	(Lithuania) Edgaras Mastianica	FK Klaipėdos Granitas	9
