= 1997–98 A Lyga =

A Lyga
- Season: 1997–98
- Dates: 9 August 1997-16 June 1998
- Champions: Kareda Siauliai
- Relegated: FK Interas; FK Tauras Taurage; FK Vienybe
- UEFA Champions League: Kareda Siauliai
- UEFA Cup: FK Zalgiris; FK Ekranas
- UEFA Cup Winner's Cup: FBK Kaunas
- UEFA Intertoto Cup: FK Inkaras Kaunas

The Lithuanian A Lyga 1997–98 was the eighth season of top-tier football in Lithuania. The season started on 9 August 1997 and ended on 17 June 1998. It was contested by 16 teams, and Kareda Šiauliai won the championship.

== Final table ==
Pos	Team	Pld	W	D	L	GF	GA	GD	Pts	Qualification or relegation
1	Kareda Šiauliai (C)	30	25	4	1	106	14	+92	79	Qualification to Champions League first qualifying round
2	Žalgiris	30	24	5	1	84	10	+74	77	Qualification to UEFA Cup first qualifying round
3	Ekranas	30	22	2	6	53	25	+28	68	Qualification to UEFA Cup first qualifying round
4	Inkaras	30	19	4	7	60	22	+38	61	Qualification to Intertoto Cup first round
5	FBK Kaunas	30	18	4	8	63	19	+44	58	Qualification to Cup Winners' Cup qualifying round
6	Atlantas	30	15	7	8	47	21	+26	52	
7	Lokomotyvas	30	14	4	12	35	29	+6	46	
8	Ranga-Politechnika (R)	30	12	8	10	42	36	+6	44	Defunct after end of season
9	Panerys (R)	30	10	9	11	36	39	−3	39	Defunct in the next season
10	Nevėžis	30	9	4	17	25	52	−27	31	
11	Mastis	30	9	4	17	29	62	−33	31	
12	Geležinis Vilkas	30	7	6	17	31	44	−13	27	
13	Banga	30	7	3	20	34	57	−23	24	
14	Interas-AE (R)	30	5	5	20	28	68	−40	20	Relegation to 1 Lyga
15	Tauras (R)	30	5	4	21	28	93	−65	19	Relegation to 1 Lyga
16	Vienybė (R)	30	2	1	27	15	125	−110	7	Relegation to 1 Lyga

Source: RSSSF.com
(C) Champions; (R) Relegated

== Results ==
Home \ Away	ATL	BAN	EKR	FBK	GEL	INK	IAE	KAR	LOK	MAS	NEV	PAN	RAN	TAU	VIE	ŽAL
Atlantas		2–0	2–0	0–0	2–1	0–1	1–0	1–2	1–1	3–0	2–0	0–0	3–1	9–0	6–1	0–0
Banga	1–3		1–0	0–3	0–3	0–4	7–0	0–3	1–2	3–0	0–0	1–1	0–1	2–0	9–0	0–1
Ekranas	1–0	2–1		1–0	2–1	2–1	3–0	1–1	2–0	3–1	2–1	3–2	1–0	5–0	2–1	0–2
FBK Kaunas	1–0	5–0	2–1		2–0	1–0	7–0	0–0	1–0	4–1	1–0	5–0	0–0	5–0	8–0	2–2
Geležinis Vilkas	0–2	4–1	0–1	1–0		2–2	2–1	0–0	2–0	0–1	0–1	1–1	0–1	0–1	3–1	1–3
Inkaras	0–0	4–0	2–0	1–0	2–1		3–0	3–1	0–1	4–1	5–2	0–0	1–0	3–0	2–0	0–1
Interas-AE	0–1	0–0	0–2	1–3	2–1	2–2		0–5	1–1	4–1	1–1	0–1	0–1	0–0	6–0	0–4
Kareda Šiauliai	3–0	4–0	3–0	3–1	6–0	3–1	4–1		1–0	7–0	3–1	3–0	3–1	5–1	8–1	1–1
Lokomotyvas	2–0	2–1	0–1	0–3	0–0	0–1	2–0	0–2		4–1	1–0	0–0	2–3	2–0	3–0	0–1
Mastis	1–1	2–0	1–2	1–0	0–0	1–3	2–1	0–5	1–0		1–2	0–1	+:- (Note: The match between Mastis and Ranga-Politechnika was rated with a goalless win for Mastis.)	3–0	4–0	0–2
Nevėžis	0–1	1–0	0–3	0–2	3–0	1–0	1–0	0–6	0–3	2–1		0–1	1–1	2–2	5–0	0–6
Panerys	1–0	1–3	0–1	1–0	1–1	0–1	1–2	0–2	0–1	7–1	3–0		1–1	4–1	2–0	0–2
Ranga-Politechnika	0–0	2–0	1–3	2–1	3–0	1–3	2–1	0–3	3–5	0–0	4–0	1–1		2–0	3–1	1–1
Tauras	1–2	0–3	2–5	1–2	2–1	0–3	5–1	0–10	0–1	0–3	2–0	2–2	2–2		5–0	0–4
Vienybė	0–5	1–0	0–4	0–3	0–6	1–8	3–4	0–7	0–2	0–0	0–1	0–4	0–4	5–1		0–3
Žalgiris	3–0	6–0	0–0	3–1	3–0	1–0	2–0	1–2	3–0	4–1	1–0	7–0	3–1	7–0	7–0	

Legend: Blue = home team win; Yellow = draw; Red = away team win.
