= 2000 A Lyga =

A Lyga
- Season: 2000
- Dates: 25 May - 4 November
- Champions: FBK Kaunas
- Relegated: FK Kareda Kaunas; KS Polonia Vilnius; FK Banga Gargzdai
- UEFA Champions League: FBK Kaunas
- UEFA Cup: FK Zalgiris; FK Atlantas
- UEFA Intertoto Cup: FK Ekranas

The 2000 A Lyga was the 11th season of top-tier football in Lithuania. The season ran from 25 March to 4 November 2000. Ten teams participated, with FBK Kaunas winning the championship.

== League standings ==
Pos	Team	Pld	W	D	L	GF	GA	GD	Pts	Qualification or relegation
1	FBK Kaunas (C)	36	26	8	2	115	24	+91	86	Qualification to Champions League first qualifying round
2	Žalgiris	36	25	8	3	108	28	+80	83	Qualification to UEFA Cup qualifying round
3	Atlantas	36	21	4	11	70	45	+25	67	Qualification to UEFA Cup qualifying round
4	Ekranas	36	18	8	10	57	31	+26	62	Qualification to Intertoto Cup first round
5	Kareda (R)	36	17	9	10	56	49	+7	60	Relegation to 1 Lyga (Note: Kareda were demoted to the lower league due to the regulations of LFF, as were a reserve team of FBK Kaunas.)
6	Nevėžis	36	11	14	11	31	44	−13	47	
7	Dainava	36	8	9	19	34	66	−32	33	
8	Polonija (Note: Polonija were won the play-off, but were demoted to the lower league due to the regulations of LFF, as were a reserve team of Žalgiris.) (R)	36	6	7	23	27	82	−55	25	Qualification to Relegation play-offs
9	Atletas-Inkaras (O)	36	5	6	25	28	95	−67	21	Qualification to Relegation play-offs
10	Banga (R)	36	3	7	26	19	81	−62	16	Relegation to 1 Lyga

Source: RSSSF.com
(C) Champions; (O) Play-off winners; (R) Relegated

== Results ==
=== First half of season ===
Home \ Away	ATL	AIK	BAN	DAI	EKR	FBK	KAR	NEV	POL	ŽAL
Atlantas		4–1	2–0	2–0	2–0	1–4	1–0	1–2	2–0	4–1
Atletas-Inkaras	1–4		2–1	0–4	1–3	1–3	1–1	2–5	0–3	0–1
Banga	0–5	1–1		1–2	0–0	0–1	0–2	1–2	2–2	1–1
Dainava	1–3	3–1	0–0		0–1	1–4	1–2	1–1	1–1	0–4
Ekranas	3–1	1–1	5–0	2–3		0–4	0–2	0–1	3–0	1–2
FBK Kaunas	5–1	0–0	7–1	0–0	1–1		2–0	0–0	5–0	0–0
Kareda	1–0	1–0	4–2	5–1	0–0	1–5		1–1	2–1	2–1
Nevėžis	1–2	2–0	0–2	1–1	0–1	0–2	0–0		0–0	0–7
Polonija	1–3	3–1	3–0	2–1	0–4	0–5	0–0	0–1		0–4
Žalgiris	1–0	4–0	3–0	4–0	1–0	1–1	2–1	5–0	3–0	

Legend: Blue = home team win; Yellow = draw; Red = away team win.

=== Second half of season ===
Home \ Away	ATL	AIK	BAN	DAI	EKR	FBK	KAR	NEV	POL	ŽAL
Atlantas		3–0	3–1	2–1	0–0	1–3	0–2	2–0	5–1	2–2
Atletas-Inkaras	3–2		1–0	1–2	0–2	1–2	0–3	1–2	2–0	0–8
Banga Gargždai	0–2	1–0		0–1	0–1	0–7	0–3	0–0	1–0	1–2
Dainava	0–1	1–1	2–0		0–1	1–4	0–2	1–1	0–0	1–3
Ekranas	0–0	6–0	3–1	2–0		1–0	3–2	0–0	7–1	1–2
FBK Kaunas	5–3	8–0	8–1	0–2	2–0		6–1	2–0	4–0	3–3
Kareda	1–3	3–1	1–1	2–1	1–1	1–5		2–3	0–2	2–2
Nevėžis	0–0	1–1	1–0	4–0	0–2	0–5	0–0		0–0	0–0
Polonija	1–2	1–2	2–0	0–0	1–2	0–1	1–2	0–2		1–6
Žalgiris	3–1	6–1	2–0	8–1	2–0	1–1	2–3	2–0	9–0	

Legend: Blue = home team win; Yellow = draw; Red = away team win.

== Relegation play-off ==
Team 1	Agg.	Team 2	1st leg	2nd leg
Laisvė Šilutė	1–3	Atletas-Inkaras	0–1	1–2
Klevas Šiauliai	3–4	Polonija	3–3	0–1
