= Dainius Saulėnas =

Lithuanian footballer

Personal information
- Date of birth: 13 March 1979 (age 47)
- Place of birth: Vilnius, Lithuania
- Height: 1.72 m (5 ft 7 1/2 in)
- Position: Forward

Senior career*
Years	Team	Apps	(Gls)
1996–2001	Žalgiris	121	(44)
2001	Jagiellonia Białystok	3	(1)
2002–2003	Žalgiris	43	(8)
2004	Vilnius	15	(0)
2005–2009	Ekranas	77	(3)
2010	Narva Trans	19	(2)
2010	Vidzgiris Alytus	14	(3)

International career
1997–1999	Lithuania	3	(0)
- * Club domestic league appearances and goals

Dainius Saulėnas (born 13 March 1979) is a Lithuanian former professional footballer who played as a forward.

== Club career ==
He previously played for Jagiellonia Białystok in Poland.

== International career ==
Saulėnas made three appearances for the Lithuania national team from 1997 to 1999.

== Honours ==
Žalgiris

- A Lyga: 1998–99
- Lithuanian Cup: 1996–97, 2003

Ekranas

- A Lyga: 2008
