= Emilijus Zubas =

Lithuanian footballer (born 1990)

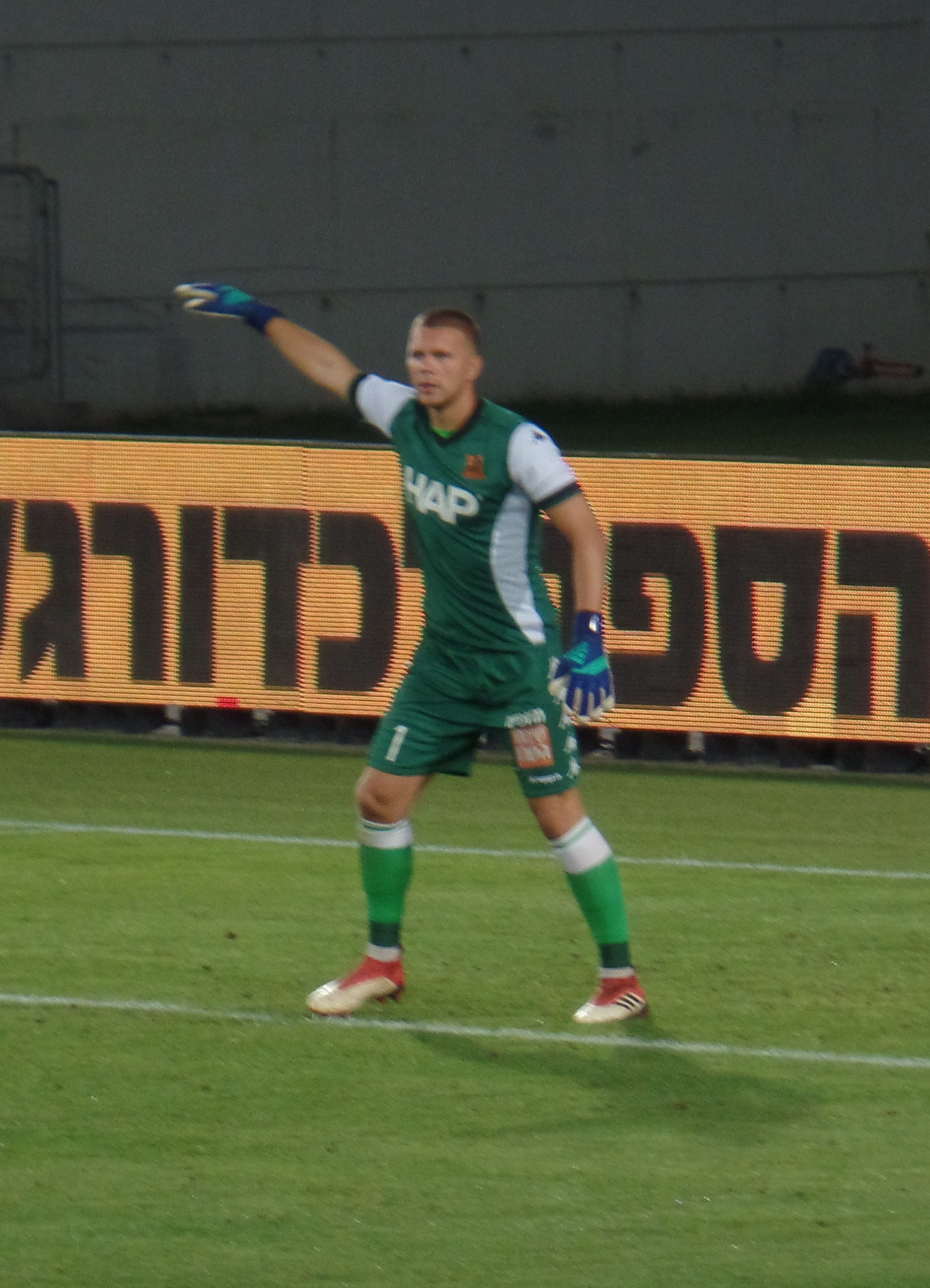

Personal information
- Date of birth: 10 July 1990 (age 36)
- Place of birth: Panevėžys, Lithuania
- Height: 1.90 m (6 ft 3 in)
- Position: Goalkeeper

Youth career
- FK Ekranas

Senior career*
Years	Team	Apps	(Gls)
2008–2010	FK Ekranas-2	19	(1)
2010–2012	FK Ekranas	58	(0)
2013–2015	Daugava Rīga	0	(0)
2013	→ GKS Bełchatów (loan)	15	(0)
2013	→ AEK Larnaca (loan)	0	(0)
2014	→ Viborg FF (loan)	0	(0)
2014–2015	→ GKS Bełchatów (loan)	10	(0)
2015–2016	Podbeskidzie Bielsko-Biała	34	(0)
2016–2020	Bnei Yehuda	123	(0)
2020–2021	Adana Demirspor	27	(0)
2021–2023	FC Arouca	4	(0)
2023–2024	Hapoel Tel Aviv	43	(0)
Total		333	(1)

International career
2011–2012	Lithuania U21	8	(0)
2013–2024	Lithuania	19	(0)
- * Club domestic league appearances and goals

Emilijus Zubas (born 10 July 1990) is a Lithuanian former professional footballer who played as a goalkeeper.

== Club career ==
=== Daugava Rīga ===
Before the start of the 2013 Latvian Higher League season, Zubas signed a long-term contract with Daugava Rīga, moving from the Lithuanian A Lyga club FK Ekranas. With Artūrs Vaičulis filling the first keeper's spot, Zubas was loaned out to the Polish Ekstraklasa club GKS Bełchatów. Despite remarkable individual performance, his club was relegated from the Ekstraklasa and Zubas returned to Daugava Rīga. For the second half of the 2013 season, he was loaned out to the Cypriot First Division club AEK Larnaca. Before the start of the 2014 season, Zubas was loaned to the Danish Superliga club Viborg FF. In July 2014, Zubas was recalled from loan and filled in Daugava's entry for the UEFA Europa League match against Aberdeen. Following the match, he was yet again sent out on loan, returning to his former club GKS Bełchatów.

=== GKS Bełchatów ===
In January 2013, Zubas joined Polish Ekstraklasa club GKS Bełchatów on loan. Despite GKS's relegation at the end of the season, Zubas was repeatedly praised for his performance and form, which resulted in his first call-up to the Lithuanian national team. He was also voted as the best goalkeeper of the 2012–13 Ekstraklasa season.

== Honours ==
Ekranas

- A Lyga: 2011, 2012
- Lithuanian Football Cup: 2010–11

Bnei Yehuda

- Israel State Cup: 2016–17, 2018–19

Individual

- Ekstraklasa Goalkeeper of the Season: 2012–13
- Ekstraklasa Player of the Month: March 2013
