= 2002 A Lyga =

A Lyga
- Season: 2002
- Dates: 6 April-4 November
- Champions: FBK Kaunas
- Relegated: FK Gelezinis Vilkas; FK Nevezis
- UEFA Champions League: FBK Kaunas
- UEFA Cup: FK Atlantas; FK Ekranas
- UEFA Intertoto Cup: FK Zalgiris

The Lithuanian A Lyga 2002 was the 13th season of top-tier football in Lithuania. The season started on 6 April 2002 and ended on 9 November 2002. 9 teams participated with FBK Kaunas winning the championship.

== League standings ==
Pos	Team	Pld	W	D	L	GF	GA	GD	Pts	Qualification or relegation
1	FBK Kaunas (C)	32	24	6	2	85	20	+65	78	Qualification to Champions League first qualifying round
2	Atlantas	32	20	7	5	58	23	+35	67	Qualification to UEFA Cup qualifying round
3	Ekranas	32	16	7	9	43	25	+18	55	Qualification to UEFA Cup qualifying round
4	Žalgiris	32	12	11	9	46	37	+9	47	Qualification to Intertoto Cup first round
5	Inkaras (R)	32	13	7	12	34	29	+5	46	Defunct after end of season
6	Sūduva	32	11	8	13	44	50	−6	41	
7	Sakalas	32	8	10	14	30	56	−26	34	
8	Geležinis Vilkas (R)	32	4	6	22	26	75	−49	18	Qualification to Relegation play-offs
9	Nevėžis (R)	32	2	6	24	19	70	−51	12	Relegation to 1 Lyga

Source: RSSSF.com
(C) Champions; (R) Relegated

== Results ==
=== First half of season ===
Home \ Away	ATL	EKR	FBK	GEL	INK	NEV	SAK	SŪD	ŽAL
Atlantas		2–1	0–0	4–0	3–0	1–0	4–1	3–1	1–3
Ekranas	3–1		1–0	0–1	0–1	4–1	3–1	2–0	0–0
FBK Kaunas	1–0	1–0		3–0	3–0	10–0	2–1	5–0	2–0
Geležinis Vilkas	0–1	0–2	1–4		0–1	3–4	0–0	1–1	1–3
Inkaras	0–2	1–0	0–1	3–1		3–0	0–1	2–0	0–2
Nevėžis	1–4	0–2	0–2	1–2	0–1		0–2	0–2	0–0
Sakalas	1–2	1–1	0–6	3–1	0–0	0–0		2–0	0–3
Sūduva	1–4	1–0	1–5	1–0	1–1	2–0	1–1		1–1
Žalgiris	0–1	1–0	2–2	2–0	2–1	1–0	3–1	3–0	

Legend: Blue = home team win; Yellow = draw; Red = away team win.

=== Second half of season ===
Home \ Away	ATL	EKR	FBK	GEL	INK	NEV	SAK	SŪD	ŽAL
Atlantas		0–0	1–1	5–2	0–1	0–0	3–0	0–0	0–0
Ekranas	1–4		2–2	3–1	2–1	1–0	0–1	4–1	0–0
FBK Kaunas	1–1	0–1		4–1	3–0	5–2	4–1	4–1	3–0
Geležinis Vilka	1–0	0–3	0–2		0–8	1–0	1–1	0–4	1–1
Inkaras	1–2	0–0	0–1	1–0		1–0	1–1	0–0	2–0
Nevėžis	1–3	1–3	1–3	1–1	0–2		0–3	1–0	0–0
Sakalas	0–2	0–0	0–1	3–2	1–1	1–1		1–4	1–0
Sūduva	0–1	0–1	1–1	4–2	2–0	2–1	7–1		3–1
Žalgiris	1–3	2–3	2–3	2–2	1–1	5–3	3–0	2–2	

Legend: Blue = home team win; Yellow = draw; Red = away team win.

== Relegation play-off ==
Team 1	Agg.	Team 2	1st leg	2nd leg
Šviesa	2–2 (a)	Geležinis Vilkas	1–0	1–2

== See also ==
- 2002 LFF Lyga
