= Marius Skinderis =

Lithuanian footballer

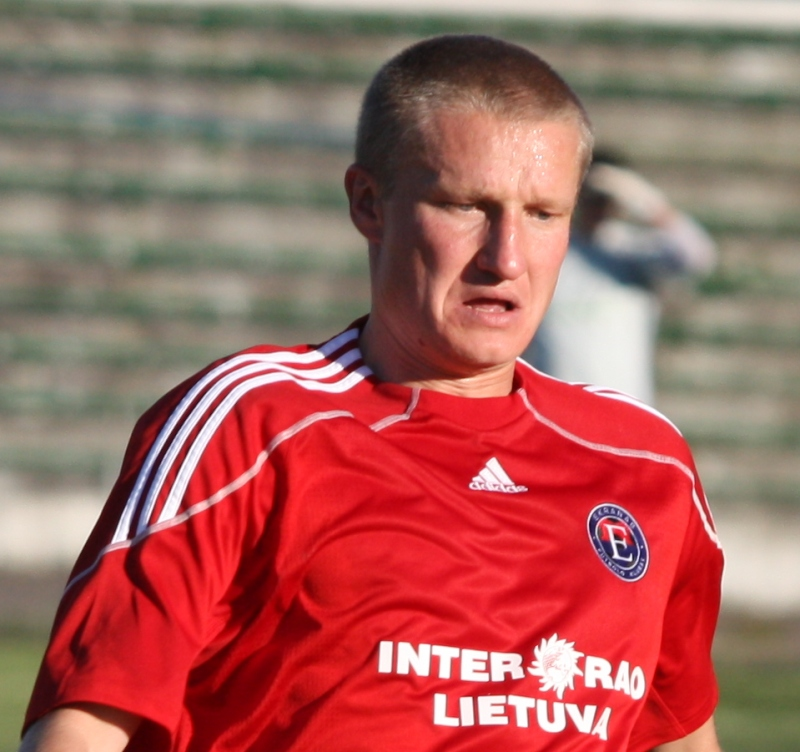

Personal information
- Date of birth: 13 October 1974 (age 52)
- Place of birth: Panevėžys, Lithuanian SSR, Soviet Union
- Height: 1.88 m (6 ft 2 in)
- Position: Defender

Team information
- Current team: Omonia (assistant)

Senior career*
Years	Team	Apps	(Gls)
1993–1994	Ekranas Panevėžys	15	(3)
1995–1996	Kareda-Sakalas Šiauliai	24	(0)
1996–1998	Ekranas Panevėžys	51	(2)
1998	Žalgiris Vilnius	0	(0)
1998–2000	GKS Bełchatów	63	(0)
2001	Stal Alchevsk	10	(2)
2001	Araks Ararat	0	(0)
2001–2002	Metalurh Donetsk	1	(0)
2001–2002	→ Metalurh-2 Donetsk	13	(1)
2002	Spartak Yerevan	18	(0)
2003–2004	Liepājas Metalurgs	37	(0)
2005–2006	Naftan Novopolotsk	35	(0)
2007–2009	Sūduva Marijampolė	72	(0)
2010–2011	Ekranas Panevėžys	18	(0)

International career
1997–2002	Lithuania	16	(0)

Managerial career
- 2014: Ekranas Panevėžys (assistant)
- 2015: Panevėžys (assistant)
- 2017–2018: Nevėžis
- 2018–2020: RFS (assistant)
- 2021: Ludogorets Razgrad (assistant)
- 2021–2022: Hajduk Split (assistant)
- 2022–2023: OFI (assistant)
- 2024–: Omonia (assistant)
- * Club domestic league appearances and goals

Marius Skinderis (born 13 October 1974) is a Lithuanian former professional footballer who played as a defender. He is currently the assistant manager of Omonia.

Skinderis has made 16 appearances for the Lithuania national football team.

== Honours ==
Kareda Kaunas

- Lithuanian Cup: 1995–96, 1997–98

Sūduva

- Lithuanian Cup: 2008–09

Ekranas

- A Lyga: 2010, 2011
- Lithuanian Cup: 2009–10, 2010–11
