= 2010–11 Lithuanian Football Cup =

Tournament details
- Country: Lithuania

The 2010–11 Lithuanian Football Cup is the 22nd season of the Lithuanian annual football knock-out tournament. The competition started on 23 May 2010 with the matches of the First Round and will end in May 2011 with the Final. Ekranas are the defending champions.

The winner of this competition will earn a place in the second qualifying round of the 2011–12 UEFA Europa League.

== First round ==
The matches were played around 23 May 2010.

Team 1	Score	Team 2
FK Rezervai Vilnius	0–2 a.e.t.	FK Kruša Basica Vilnius
FK Venta Kuršėnai	3–1	FK Trakai
FK Snoras Vilnius	2–1	FK Troja Vilnius
FK Advoko Vilnius	2–6	Akmenė
FK Žeimena Pabradė	1–2	Legionas Lavoriškės
FK Gariūnai Vilnius	3–0	Centras Alytus
Trivartis Joniškis	0–6	FM Granitas Vilnius
Švyturys Marijampolė	3–1	Dainava Veisiejai
FC KUPSC Šiauliai	4–1	FK Terra Troleibusas Vilnius
FK Narjanta Kupiskis	2–1	FK Faze Vilnius
Saulininkas Šiauliai	0–1	FK Baltai Kaišiadorys
FK Viltis Vilnius	5–0	FK Rytas Vilnius
Grifas Šiauliai	1–2	Jambo Klaipėda
FK Stickers Vilnius	0–3 w.o.	Ozas
Arpas Vilnius	1–2	FK Prelegentai Vilnius
SK Kairiai Knituva Šiauliai	2–3 a.e.t.	Polonija
FK Spartakas Ukmergė	1–1 a.e.t. 4–5 pen	FK Fanai Šiauliai
91 United Kaunas	0–0 a.e.t. 6–5 pen	Sanžilė Pasvalys
FK TEC Vilnius	0–0 a.e.t. 2–4 pen	LiCS Vilnius

The following teams received byes to the second round:

Euforija Vilnius, FTB Flintas Kaunas, Fortas Kaunas, FK Kiemas Vilnius, FK Olimpija Vilnius, FK Ozo Tapyrai Vilnius, Pagėgiai, FK Perfectus Sport Marijampolė, FK Pipirini Rokiškis, FK Reo LT Vilnius, FK Sakuona-Klarksonas Plikiai, FK Tauras Šiauliai, Visas Labas Kaunas

== Second round ==
The matches were played around 13 June 2010.

Team 1	Score	Team 2
Akmenė	2–2 a.e.t. 1–4 pen	FK Gariunai Vilnius
FK Pipirini Rokiskis	4–1	FK Snoras Vilnius
FK Prelegentai Vilnius	4–1	Euforija Vilnius
FK Baltai Kaišiadorys	4–3	Ozas
FK Ozo Tapyrai Vilnius	3–2	FTB Flintas Kaunas
FK Kruša Basica Vilnius	5–2	FC KUPSC Šiauliai
Visas Labas Kaunas	2–9	FK Reo LT Vilnius
FK Venta Kuršėnai	10–0	FK Narjanta Kupiškis
FK Fanai Šiauliai	1–5 a.e.t.	'FM Granitas Vilnius
91 United Kaunas	0–0 a.e.t. 4–3 pen	FK Kiemas Vilnius
FK Olimpija Vilnius	0–7	FK Sakuona-Klarksonas Plikiai
Jambo Klaipėda	0–2	Legionas Lavoriškės
LiCS Vilnius	1–0	FK Viltis Vilnius
FK Tauras Šiauliai	5–0	FK Perfectus Sport Marijampolė
Svyturys Marijampolė	4–2	Polonija
Fortas Kaunas	1–7	Pagėgiai

== Third round ==
The matches were played around 11 July 2010.

Team 1	Score	Team 2
FK Gariūnai Vilnius	1–3 a.e.t.	FK Reo LT Vilnius
Švyturys Marijampolė	1–0	FK Prelegentai Vilnius
FK Baltai Kaišiadorys	1–3	91 United Kaunas
FK Venta Kuršėnai	5–2	FK Pipirini Rokiškis
FK Tauras Šiauliai	3–0	FK Ozo Tapyrai Vilnius
FM Granitas Vilnius	7–2	FK Kruša Basica Vilnius
Legionas Lavoriškės	1–0	Pagėgiai
FK Sakuona-Klarksonas Plikiai	4–1 a.e.t.	LiCS Vilnius

== Fourth round ==
FK Tauras Šiauliai received a bye to the Fifth Round. These matches were played on 3, 4 and 10 August 2010.

Team 1	Score	Team 2
Lietava	1–3	FK Lifosa Kedainiai
Nevėžis	2–0	FK Venta Kuršėnai
91 United Kaunas	1–0	Švyturys Marijampolė
Kaunas	12–0	Legionas Lavoriškės
Atlantas	4–1	FK Sakuona-Klarksonas Plikiai
Minija	0–2	FM Granitas Vilnius
FK Vidzgiris	2–1	FK Reo LT Vilnius

== Fifth round ==
These matches took place on 24 and 25 August 2010.

Team 1	Score	Team 2
Kaunas	1–0	Šilutė
FK Lifosa Kedainiai	0–2	FK Vidzgiris
Mažeikiai	1–3	Klaipėda
Atletas	5–0	Alytis
Kruoja	2–0	Atlantas
Žalgiris	2–2 (a.e.t.); 2–3 (pen)	Banga
91 United Kaunas	2–3 (a.e.t.)	FM Granitas Vilnius
FK Tauras Šiauliai	0–7	Nevėžis

== Sixth Round ==
These matches took place on 29 September and 2 October 2010

Team 1	Score	Team 2
FM Granitas Vilnius	1-2	Klaipėda
Kaunas	3-0	Atletas
FK Vidzgiris	4-2	Kruoja
Banga	4-3	Nevėžis

== Quarterfinals ==
These matches took place on 3 November 2010.

Team 1	Score	Team 2
Banga	2-0	Klaipėda
FK Vidzgiris	0-1	FK Ekranas
Šiauliai	1-0	Sūduva
Tauras	2-3 aet	Kaunas

== Semifinals ==
The 4 winners from the previous round entered this stage of the competition. Unlike the previous rounds of the competition, this was played over two legs. The first legs were played on 16 March 2011 and the second legs were played on 13 April 2011.

Team 1	Agg.	Team 2	1st leg	2nd leg
Šiauliai	2–4	FK Ekranas	0–2	2–2
Kaunas	1–6	Banga	0–5	1–1

== Final ==
The final of the 2010/11 Lithuanian Football Cup took place on 14 May 2011.

Team 1	Score	Team 2
FK Ekranas	4–2 (a.e.t.)	Banga
