= 2003 A Lyga =

A Lyga
- Season: 2003
- Dates: 4 April-31 October
- Champions: FBK Kaunas
- Relegated: Sakalas Siauliai
- UEFA Champions League: FBK Kaunas
- UEFA Cup: FK Ekranas; FK Zalgiris
- UEFA Intertoto Cup: FK Vetra; FK Atlantas

The Lithuanian A Lyga 2003 was the 14th season of top-tier football in Lithuania. The season started on 4 April 2003 and ended on 31 October 2003. 8 teams participated with FBK Kaunas winning the championship.

== League standings ==
Pos	Team	Pld	W	D	L	GF	GA	GD	Pts	Qualification or relegation
1	FBK Kaunas (C)	28	21	5	2	64	20	+44	68	Qualification to Champions League first qualifying round
2	Ekranas	28	18	8	2	50	19	+31	62	Qualification to UEFA Cup first qualifying round
3	Vėtra	28	13	8	7	42	22	+20	47	Qualification to Intertoto Cup first round
4	Žalgiris	28	9	7	12	37	37	0	34	Qualification to UEFA Cup first qualifying round
5	Atlantas	28	9	6	13	27	30	−3	33	Qualification to Intertoto Cup first round
6	Sūduva	28	8	8	12	39	45	−6	32	
7	Šviesa	28	7	5	16	25	38	−13	26	
8	Sakalas (R)	28	1	5	22	13	86	−73	8	Withdrawn and relegation to lower league (Note: Sakalas was demoted to a lower league. Its place was taken by FK Šilutė.)

(C) Champions; (R) Relegated

== Results ==
=== First half of season ===
Home \ Away	ATL	EKR	FBK	SAK	SŪD	ŠVI	VĖT	ŽAL
Atlantas		0–1	0–1	6–1	1–1	1–0	1–0	2–1
Ekranas	3–1		2–1	1–0	3–1	3–0	3–1	1–1
FBK Kaunas	0–1	2–0		3–1	3–3	1–0	0–0	3–0
Sakalas	0–0	0–3	1–5		2–4	0–0	0–1	1–2
Sūduva	1–0	0–0	0–1	0–1		0–1	0–2	2–2
Sviesa	0–2	0–2	0–2	3–0	2–1		0–5	0–0
Vėtra	0–0	0–2	0–1	1–1	1–0	1–0		1–1
Žalgiris	2–0	0–0	1–2	2–0	0–1	2–2	1–3	

Legend: Blue = home team win; Yellow = draw; Red = away team win.

=== Second half of season ===
Home \ Away	ATL	EKR	FBK	SAK	SŪD	ŠVI	VĖT	ŽAL
Atlantas		0–1	1–3	4–0	3–3	0–0	2–1	0–1
Ekranas	1–0		2–2	2–1	2–2	2–1	2–3	3–0
FBK Kaunas	1–0	2–0		2–1	4–1	1–0	1–1	1–0
Sakalas	0–0	0–4	0–10		0–4	1–4	1–1	0–4
Sūduva	3–0	0–0	2–5	2–1		3–1	1–0	1–2
Sviesa	3–0	1–3	0–3	2–0	1–1		1–2	0–1
Vėtra	1–0	0–0	1–2	9–0	2–1	1–0		4–1
Žalgiris	1–2	0–2	0–2	7–0	5–1	0–3	0–0	

Legend: Blue = home team win; Yellow = draw; Red = away team win.

== See also ==
- 2003 LFF Lyga
