= 2006 Lithuanian football leagues =

LFF Lyga
- Season: 2006

Final tables of the Lithuanian Championship in 2006 are presented below. The Lithuanian Football Federation (LFF) organized three football leagues: A Lyga (the highest), 1 Lyga (second-tier), and 2 Lyga (third-tier), which comprised three regional zones.

== A Lyga ==
Pos	Team	Pld	W	D	L	GF	GA	GD	Pts	Qualification or relegation
1	FBK Kaunas (C)	36	28	4	4	85	30	+55	88	Qualification to Champions League first qualifying round
2	Ekranas	36	20	7	9	63	39	+24	67	Qualification to UEFA Cup first qualifying round
3	Vėtra	36	17	10	9	49	35	+14	61	Qualification to Intertoto Cup first round
4	Žalgiris	36	14	12	10	52	39	+13	54	
5	Sūduva	36	15	8	13	48	44	+4	53	Qualification to UEFA Cup first qualifying round
6	Atlantas	36	14	10	12	46	41	+5	52	
7	Vilnius	36	11	14	11	46	40	+6	47	
8	Šiauliai	36	10	11	15	42	46	−4	41	
9	Šilutė (R)	36	5	3	28	25	77	−52	18	Qualification to Relegation play-offs
10	Nevėžis (R)	36	4	5	27	35	100	−65	17	Relegation to 1 Lyga

Source: www2.omnitel.net
(C) Champions; (R) Relegated

== 1 Lyga ==
Pos	Team	Pld	W	D	L	GF	GA	GD	Pts
1	Kauno Jėgeriai	34	23	7	4	75	28	+47	76
2	Alytis Alytus	34	22	7	5	69	23	+46	73
3	Atlantas-2 Klaipėda	34	19	8	7	70	35	+35	65
4	Kruoja Pakruojis	34	17	9	8	71	36	+35	60
5	Rodiklis Kaunas	34	17	7	10	70	44	+26	58
6	Vėtra-2 Vilnius	34	15	7	12	64	40	+24	52
7	Interas Visaginas	34	15	7	12	59	47	+12	52
8	LKKA ir Teledema Kaunas	34	15	7	12	50	53	−3	52
9	Žalgiris-2 Vilnius	34	13	7	14	42	42	0	46
10	FC Vilnius-2	34	10	12	12	51	51	0	42
11	Sūduva-2 Marijampolė	34	12	5	17	44	65	−21	41
12	Banga Gargždai	34	9	12	13	44	49	−5	39
13	KFK Šiauliai-2	34	11	6	17	51	69	−18	39
14	Vilkmergė Ukmergė	34	10	8	16	40	51	−11	38
15	Lietava Jonava	34	9	11	14	43	56	−13	38
16	Atletas Kaunas	34	8	10	16	39	47	−8	34
17	Geležinis Vilkas Vilnius	34	7	10	17	37	55	−18	31
18	Babrungas Plungė	34	3	2	29	24	152	−128	11

== 2 Lyga ==
=== 2 Lyga zone South ===
Pos	Team	Pld	W	D	L	GF	GA	GD	Pts
1	FSK Anykšǒiai	18	12	1	5	37	23	+14	37
2	Vidzgiris Alytus	18	11	2	5	47	19	+28	35
3	Sveikata Kybartai	18	11	2	5	37	24	+13	35
4	Spyris Kaunas	18	10	4	4	35	26	+9	34
5	Utenis Utena	18	7	4	7	29	30	−1	25
6	FK Prienai	18	6	3	9	38	41	−3	21
7	Nevėžis-2 Kėdainiai	18	6	3	9	28	35	−7	21
8	SC-Savingė Kaišiadorys	18	5	6	7	21	33	−12	21
9	LVDK Kaunas	17	4	2	11	28	35	−7	14
10	FK Kalvarija	17	3	1	13	12	46	−34	10

=== 2 Lyga zone West ===
Pos	Team	Pld	W	D	L	GF	GA	GD	Pts
1	SM Šilutė-2	20	16	3	1	88	12	+76	51
2	Sakuona Plikiai	20	17	0	3	96	23	+73	51
3	Tauras ir ERRA Tauragė	20	13	3	4	71	28	+43	42
4	Švyturys Klaipėda	20	12	3	5	55	23	+32	39
5	Glestum Klaipėda	20	12	3	5	48	22	+26	39
6	Minija Kretinga	20	9	4	7	40	30	+10	31
7	Bangele Gargždai	20	8	1	11	40	42	−2	25
8	Salantas Salantai	20	5	1	14	23	66	−43	16
9	Piritas Klaipėda	20	4	2	14	25	48	−23	14
10	FK Pagėgiai	20	3	1	16	18	96	−78	10
11	FK Skuodas	20	0	1	19	11	125	−114	1

=== 2 Lyga zone North ===
Pos	Team	Pld	W	D	L	GF	GA	GD	Pts
1	Ekranas-2 Panevėžys	21	15	4	2	42	16	+26	49
2	Kražantė Kelmė	21	13	4	4	44	22	+22	43
3	FK Mažeikiai	21	11	5	5	57	26	+31	38
4	Rinkuškiai Biržai	21	8	3	10	27	28	−1	27
5	Juventa-99 Šiauliai	21	7	6	8	25	22	+3	27
6	Venta Kuršėnai	21	6	5	10	26	35	−9	23
7	Mastis Telšiai	21	5	3	13	22	39	−17	18
8	SC Akmenė-Šiauliai-3	21	4	0	17	23	78	−55	12
