= 2009–10 Lithuanian Football Cup =

Tournament details
- Country: Lithuania

The 2009–10 Lithuanian Football Cup is the 21st season of the Lithuanian annual football knock-out tournament. The competition started around 28 May 2009 with the matches of the First Round and will end in May 2010 with the Final. FK Sūduva are the defending champions.

The winner of this competition earned a place in the second qualifying round of the 2010–11 UEFA Europa League.

== First round ==
In this round entered 35 teams from the Lithuanian third, fourth and fifth divisions. The matches were played around 28 May 2009.

Team 1	Score	Team 2
KUPSC Šiauliai	3–1	Saulininkas Šiauliai
Kiemas Vilnius	0–2	Stickers Vilnius
Tera-Troleibusas Vilnius	1–2	Švyturys Marijampolė
Minija Kretinga	0–0 aet 4–2 p	Gariūnai Vilnius
Knituva Kairiai	3–3 aet 5–4 p	Baltai Kaišiadorys
Ozas Vilnius	1–2	Visas Labas Kaunas
Žygis Joniškis	5–1	Trivartis Vilnius
Prelegentai Vilnius	2–0	Fortūna Vilnius
Vidzgiris Alytus	3–1	TEC Vilnius
Lifosa Kedainiai	2–2 aet 4–5 p	Orša Vilnius
Akademija Klaipėda	10–0	Futera Klaipėda
Aitvaras Šiauliai	2–3	Sakuona Plikiai
Narjanta Kupiškis	0–3	Fazė Vilnius
Rezervai Vilnius	2–4	Rytas Vilnius
LiCS Vilnius	2–1	Creditinfo Lietuva Vilnius
Troja Vilnius	0–3	FK Atlantas Klaipėda
Jambo Klaipėda	0–4	FBK Kaunas
Walkover to next round: Venta Kursenai

== Second round ==
This round featured eighteen winners from the first round. The matches were played around 25 June 2009.

Team 1	Score	Team 2
FBK Kaunas	13–0	Žygis Joniškis
Visas Labas Kaunas	4–2	Prelegentai Vilnius
Vidzgiris Alytus	2–3	Venta Kuršėnai
Knituva Kairiai	1–2 aet	LiCS Vilnius
FK Atlantas Klaipėda	7–1	Akademija Klaipėda
Orsa Vilnius	1–2	Fazė Vilnius
Minija Kretinga	2–2 aet 4–3 p	Švyturys Marijampolė
KUPSC Šiauliai	0–2	Sakuona Plikiai
Stickers Vilnius	8–0	Rytas Vilnius

== Third round ==
Seven teams from the 2009 I Lyga, Lithuania's second division, entered the competition in this round and joined the nine winners from the second round. The matches were played between 27 July and 9 August 2009.

Team 1	Score	Team 2
Mažeikiai	2–2 aet 5–6 p	Sakuona Plikiai
Lietava Jonava	1–2	VMFD Žalgiris Vilnius
Stickers Vilnius	0–3	Venta Kuršėnai
Glestum Klaipėda	0–2	Šilutė
Visas Labas Kaunas	3–0	Fazė Vilnius
Minija Kretinga	1–5	Nevėžis Kėdainiai
FBK Kaunas	2–0	FK Atlantas Klaipėda
Alytis Alytus	2–1	LiCS Vilnius

== Fourth round ==
This round featured eight winners from the third round. The matches were played on 18 August 2009.

Team 1	Score	Team 2
Nevėžis Kėdainiai	1–5	Šilutė
Sakuona Plikiai	4–2	Visas Labas Kaunas
Venta Kuršėnai	2–3 aet	VMFD Žalgiris Vilnius
FBK Kaunas	5–1	Alytis Alytus

== Fifth round ==
Four teams ranked fifth through eighth from the 2009 A Lyga entered the competition in this round and joined the four winners from the fourth round. The matches were played on 21 October 2009.

Team 1	Score	Team 2
Kruoja Pakruojis	1–2	Šilutė
Sakuona Plikiai	2–1 aet	VMFD Žalgiris Vilnius
Tauras Tauragė	2–1	LKKA ir Teledema Kaunas
Banga Gargždai	0–4	FBK Kaunas

== Quarterfinals ==
Four teams ranked first through fourth from the 2009 A Lyga entered the competition in this round and joined the four winners from the fifth round. The matches were played on 7 and 8 November 2009.

Team 1	Score	Team 2
Tauras Tauragė	1–1 aet 3–4 p	Vėtra Vilnius
FBK Kaunas	3–0	Šiauliai
Šilutė	1–1 aet 5–6 p	Ekranas Panevėžys
Sakuona Plikiai	2–8	Sūduva Marijampolė

== Semifinals ==
The first legs were played on March 31, 2010. The second legs were played on April 14, 2010. Second semifinal game in Marijampolė between FK Vėtra and FK Sūduva ended in some controversy. While full-time ended in a draw, during added time each team scored a goal. After the final whistle FK Vėtras players left the field thinking that the game ended in their victory on the away goal rule. But since in LFF Cup the away goal rule does not apply for goals scored during the added time, FK Vėtra premature celebrations were stopped by the referee and players had to return to the field for a penalty shootout which was won by FK Vėtra nonetheless.

Team 1	Agg.	Team 2	1st leg	2nd leg
Kaunas	1–4	Ekranas Panevėžys	1–2	0–2
Vėtra Vilnius	3–3 (p) 4–2	Sūduva Marijampolė	1–1	2–2 (aet)

== Final ==
The final is to be held at the S. Darius and S. Girėnas Stadium in Kaunas.

15 May 2010
17:10 EEDT

Ekranas Panevėžys	2–1	Vėtra Vilnius
Galkevičius 69'; Varnas 89'		45' Ražanauskas

S. Darius and S. Girėnas Stadium, Kaunas
Attendance: 1300
Referee: Edmundas Gaigalas
