= Nerijus Vasiliauskas =

Lithuanian footballer

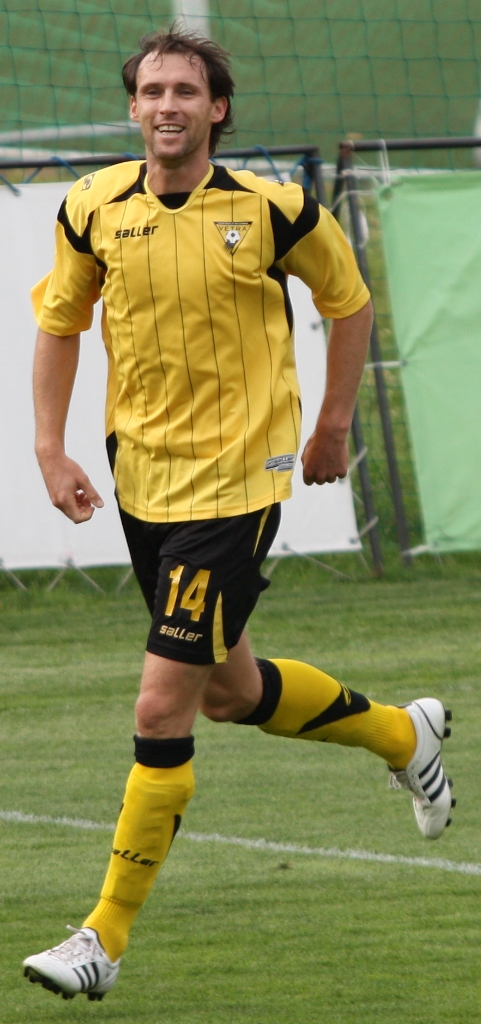

Personal information
- Full name: Nerijus Vasiliauskas
- Date of birth: 20 June 1977 (age 49)
- Place of birth: Jonava, Lithuanian SSR
- Height: 1.86 m (6 ft 1 in)
- Position: Midfielder

Senior career*
Years	Team	Apps	(Gls)
1995–1999	Žalgiris	51	(19)
1996–1997	→ Žalgiris-Volmeta Vilnius	24	(2)
2000	Lokomotiv Nizhny Novgorod	5	(1)
2001	Žalgiris	19	(11)
2002–2003	Wisła Płock	10	(1)
2004–2005	Vėtra	30	(7)
2005–2007	Tavriya Simferopol	39	(4)
2008	Žalgiris	11	(3)
2009	Vėtra	20	(4)
2010	Sillamäe Kalev	21	(9)
2011	Fakyrai-MRU Vilnius		
2011	Jonava		

International career
1997–2002	Lithuania	6	(2)
- * Club domestic league appearances and goals

Nerijus Vasiliauskas (born 20 June 1977) is a Lithuanian former professional footballer who played as a midfielder.

== Honours ==
Žalgiris

- A Lyga: 1998–99

Individual

- A Lyga top scorer: 1999
