= Yevhen Mohil =

Ukrainian footballer

Personal information
- Full name: Yevhen Ruslanovych Mohil
- Date of birth: 11 January 1999 (age 27)
- Place of birth: Kyiv, Ukraine
- Height: 1.94 m (6 ft 4 in)
- Position: Striker

Team information
- Current team: Dordoi Bishkek
- Number: 11

Youth career
- 2009–2010: Youth Sportive School Kyiv
- 2010–2012: Dynamo Kyiv
- 2012–2016: Piddubny Olympic College

Senior career*
| Years | Team | Apps | (Gls) |
| 2016–2017 | Lutsk | 3 | (1) |
| 2017 | Kovel-Volyn Kovel | 4 | (0) |
| 2017–2018 | Volyn Lutsk | 3 | (0) |
| 2018–2019 | Olimpik Donetsk | 0 | (0) |
| 2019–2020 | Podillya Khmelnytskyi | 0 | (0) |
| 2020–2021 | Rubikon Kyiv | 20 | (2) |
| 2021 | → Olimpik Donetsk (loan) | 0 | (0) |
| 2022–2024 | Nevėžis | 46 | (22) |
| 2024 | KSZO Ostrowiec Świętokrzyski | 4 | (1) |
| 2024–2025 | Nevėžis | | |
| 2026– | Dordoi Bishkek | 0 | (0) |
- * Club domestic league appearances and goals as of 19:57, 18 June 2025 (UTC)

Yevhen Ruslanovych Mohil (Ukrainian: Євген Русланович Могіль; born 11 January 1999) is a Ukrainian professional footballer who plays as a striker for Kyrgyz Premier League club Dordoi Bishkek.

== Career ==
Born in Kyiv, Mohil is a product of three of the city's youth academies.

In January 2021, he joined Ukrainian Premier League side Olimpik Donetsk on loan.
