= Adebayo Akinfenwa =

English footballer (born 1982)

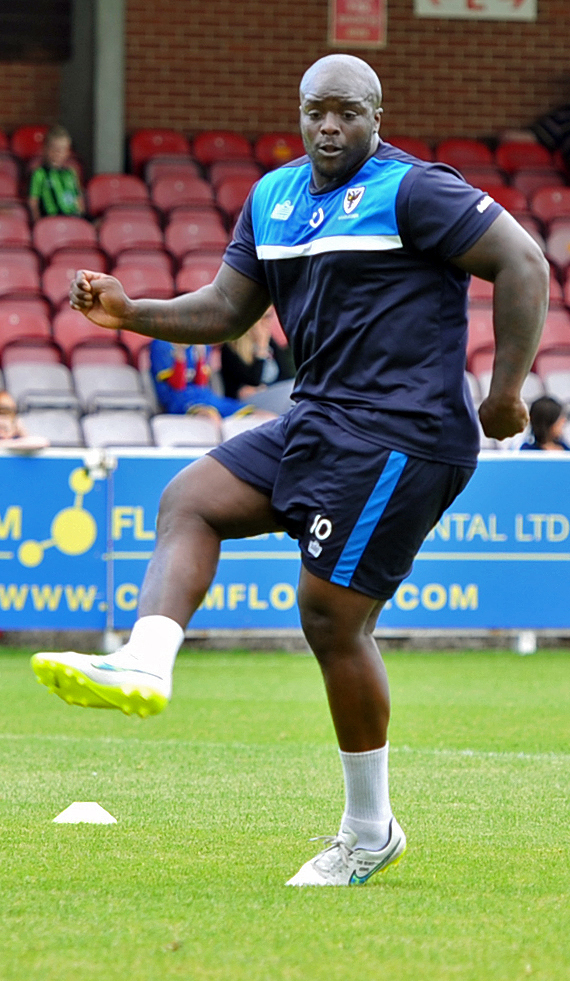
- Akinfenwa in training with AFC Wimbledon in 2015

Personal information
- Full name: Saheed Adebayo Akinfenwa
- Date of birth: 10 May 1982 (age 44)
- Place of birth: Islington, England
- Height: 6 ft 1 in (1.85 m)
- Position: Striker

Youth career
- 2000–2001: Watford

Senior career*
Years	Team	Apps	(Gls)
2001–2002	Atlantas	22	(5)
2002	Laisvė Šilutė	0	(0)
2002	Barry Town	9	(6)
2003	Boston United	3	(0)
2003	Leyton Orient	1	(0)
2003–2004	Rushden & Diamonds	0	(0)
2004	Doncaster Rovers	9	(4)
2004–2005	Torquay United	37	(14)
2005–2007	Swansea City	59	(14)
2007–2008	Millwall	7	(0)
2008–2010	Northampton Town	88	(37)
2010–2011	Gillingham	44	(11)
2011–2013	Northampton Town	80	(34)
2013–2014	Gillingham	34	(10)
2014–2016	AFC Wimbledon	83	(19)
2016–2022	Wycombe Wanderers	219	(52)
2023	Faversham Town	2	(0)
Total		697	(206)
- * Club domestic league appearances and goals

Saheed Adebayo Akinfenwa (born 10 May 1982) is an English former professional footballer who played as a striker. Nicknamed "The Beast", he was renowned for his huge physical prowess and goalscoring ability, in a career where he amassed more than 200 goals.

Akinfenwa's professional breakthrough came at Doncaster Rovers, having spent time up until then in the lower leagues of English football as well as spells in Lithuania and Wales. Following a short but successful time at Doncaster, Akinfenwa moved to his seventh club, Torquay United. He proved to be a goal threat but left the struggling team the following season to join Swansea City. After spending two seasons with the Welsh club, he joined League One side Millwall and later moved to Northampton Town. Akinfenwa spent six years switching from Northampton to Gillingham, where his goal-scoring ability was still apparent. In June 2014, he signed for League Two side AFC Wimbledon, and two years later Wycombe Wanderers, where he remained until his retirement in 2022. His last professional match was at Wembley Stadium in the League One play-off final against Sunderland on 21 May 2022.

== Early life ==
Akinfenwa was born in Islington, North London, and is of Yoruba Nigerian descent. His father is a Muslim and his mother is a Christian. As a child, he supported Liverpool and his favourite player was John Barnes.

== Career ==
=== Early career ===
As a teenager, Akinfenwa joined the Lithuanian club FK Atlantas on the advice of his agent, whose Lithuanian wife's brother knew a member of the coaching staff there. While with the club Akinfenwa scored the winning goal in the 2001 Lithuanian Football Cup final and played in the UEFA Cup qualifying rounds for two successive seasons. He received racial abuse from fans in the country, later saying "Coming from London, where nobody would disrespect me, this was just brazen". He spent two years at the club, as well as one month at another Lithuanian team Laisvė Šilutė, before returning to the UK early in 2003, where he joined Welsh Premier League champions Barry Town. Akinfenwa helped Barry to Welsh Cup and Welsh Premier League silverware during his time at Jenner Park. However, just a handful of matches into his stint, the club suffered a financial crisis and released its professional playing staff. Akinfenwa quickly joined Boston United in October 2003, scoring a last minute winner on his debut against Swindon Town in the Football League Trophy. Unable to settle, he moved to Leyton Orient the following month, but was released after one month. In December 2003 he moved to Rushden & Diamonds and in February 2004 joined Doncaster Rovers, his fifth club of the season.

=== Torquay United ===
In July 2004, Akinfenwa changed clubs again, signing for Torquay United, as a replacement for David Graham. He scored 14 league goals during the 2004–05 season and was named the supporter's Player of the Season but was unable to help the club avoid relegation to League Two. He declined to sign a new contract with Torquay at the end of the season.

=== Swansea City ===
In July 2005, Akinfenwa moved to Swansea City, who were ordered to pay an £85,000 fee as compensation, significantly below the £300,000 asking price Torquay had set for his signature. He scored on his debut against Tranmere Rovers, and this was also the first competitive goal scored at Swansea's new Liberty Stadium. He scored the winning goal in the 2006 Football League Trophy Final, in which Swansea beat Carlisle United 2–1. He also helped Swansea reach the League One promotion play-off final in his first season. After a 2–2 draw, the match went to a penalty shoot-out but Akinfenwa was one of two Swansea players to miss with their penalties, granting promotion to Barnsley. He was a regular the following season, until a broken right leg in the 2–0 defeat at home to Scunthorpe United ended his season. This followed a fractured left shin the previous October.

=== Millwall ===
At the end of the 2006–07 season, he rejected a new contract with Swansea, and agreed to sign for Swindon Town on 29 June 2007. However, he failed a medical.

After a period of rehabilitation and training at Gillingham, he joined League One team Millwall on a month-to-month contract in November 2007. However he failed to score any goals in seven appearances.

=== Northampton Town ===
On 18 January 2008 Akinfenwa signed a deal with Northampton Town until the end of the 2007–08 season. He made his debut against Swindon Town, where he came off the bench to score a late equaliser in a 1–1 draw. He then had the same impact in his home debut, scoring the equaliser in a 1–1 draw against Leeds United. Despite not featuring in the following game against Yeovil Town, he started the next home match against Gillingham, and scored two goals in a 4–0 win. He scored three further goals that season.

On 30 May 2008, Akinfenwa signed a new one-year contract at Northampton despite declared interest from Leyton Orient and Grimsby Town. He started the 2008–09 season well, scoring twice in three matches by the end of September.

Akinfenwa ended his stay at Northampton in May 2010. He had been offered a new deal but Northampton could not agree a deal with him within an agreed timeframe.

=== Gillingham ===
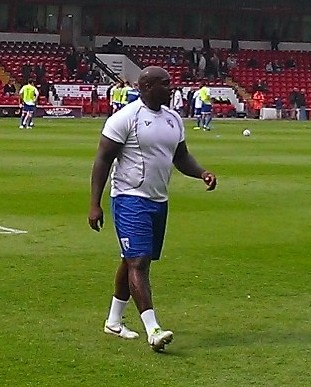
Akinfenwa warming up for Gillingham in 2014

On 29 July 2010, he signed for Gillingham on a one-year contract, and scored on his debut with a header against Cheltenham Town. Whilst at the Gills, Akinfenwa was able to form a strong partnership with Cody McDonald and the pair were able to score 36 goals between them that season.

=== Return to Northampton Town ===
Akinfenwa was offered a new contract by Gillingham at the conclusion of 2010–11 season, but chose instead to return to Sixfields on 25 May 2011, after new Cobblers manager Gary Johnson brought him in to "capture the imagination of the supporters". He scored his first goal against Bristol Rovers on 16 August. On 10 November 2012 in a match against Accrington Stanley, Akinfenwa scored his first, and to date only, professional hat-trick. Three years later, with Northampton struggling financially, Akinfenwa auctioned off the shirt he wore in this match and donated the proceeds to a supporters' trust, raising £440. Northampton Town released him at the end of the 2012–13 season.

=== Return to Gillingham ===
Akinfenwa re-signed for Gillingham on a free transfer on 2 July 2013. After reigniting his successful partnership with Cody McDonald, scoring 10 goals over the course of the 2013–14 season and coming third in their Supporters Player of the Year awards, Akinfenwa left the club on expiry of his one-year contract.

=== AFC Wimbledon ===
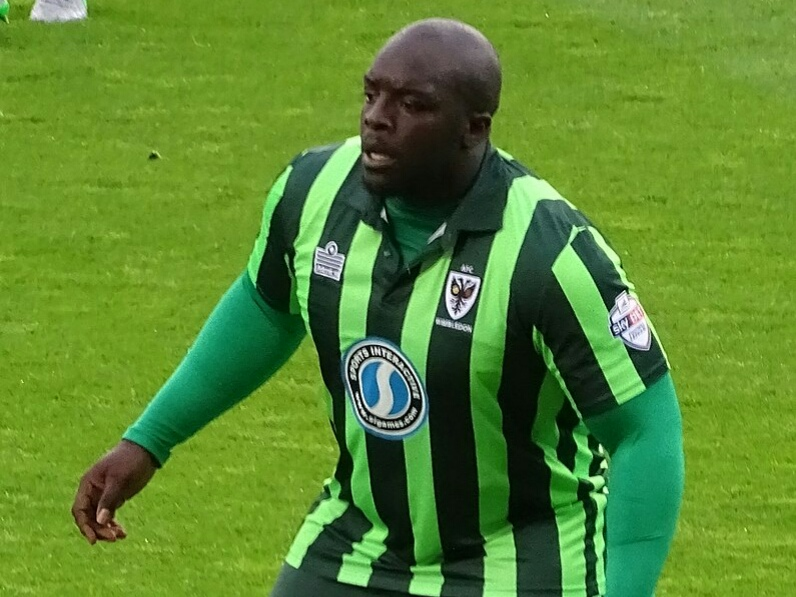
Akinfenwa playing for AFC Wimbledon in 2015

On 20 June 2014, he signed for League Two side AFC Wimbledon, who had pursued his signature for 14 months. In the third round of the FA Cup on 5 January 2015, in which AFC Wimbledon hosted Liverpool at Kingsmeadow, Akinfenwa equalised against the club he supports, albeit in a 1–2 defeat. On 8 June 2015, Akinfenwa extended his contract with Wimbledon, spurning interests from clubs in League One and Major League Soccer. On 30 May 2016, after scoring a penalty in a 2–0 win against Plymouth Argyle in the League Two Play-off Final, Akinfenwa was released from his contract. He told Sky Sports in his post-match interview: "I think I'm technically unemployed, so any managers hit me up on the WhatsApp and get me a job."

=== Wycombe Wanderers ===
Following his departure from AFC Wimbledon, Akinfenwa signed for Wycombe Wanderers. In April 2018, he was nominated for the EFL League Two Player of the Season award. With his strike against Doncaster Rovers on 29 February 2020, Akinfenwa became Wycombe's record goal scorer in the English Football League with 54 goals. On 13 July 2020, Akinfenwa and Wycombe won the 2020 League One play-off final over Oxford gaining promotion to the Championship for the first time in both the player's career and the club's history. Akinfenwa finished the season as the club's joint-top league goal scorer with 10 goals.

On 8 July 2021, Akinfenwa signed a new one-year contract with the club. He confirmed that it would be his last season in professional football, and indicated that after football he was considering moving into acting or professional wrestling. Akinfenwa's last game for Wycombe was the 2022 EFL League One play-off final, where he featured as a 75th minute substitute but could not prevent a 2–0 loss to Sunderland.

=== Post-professional retirement ===
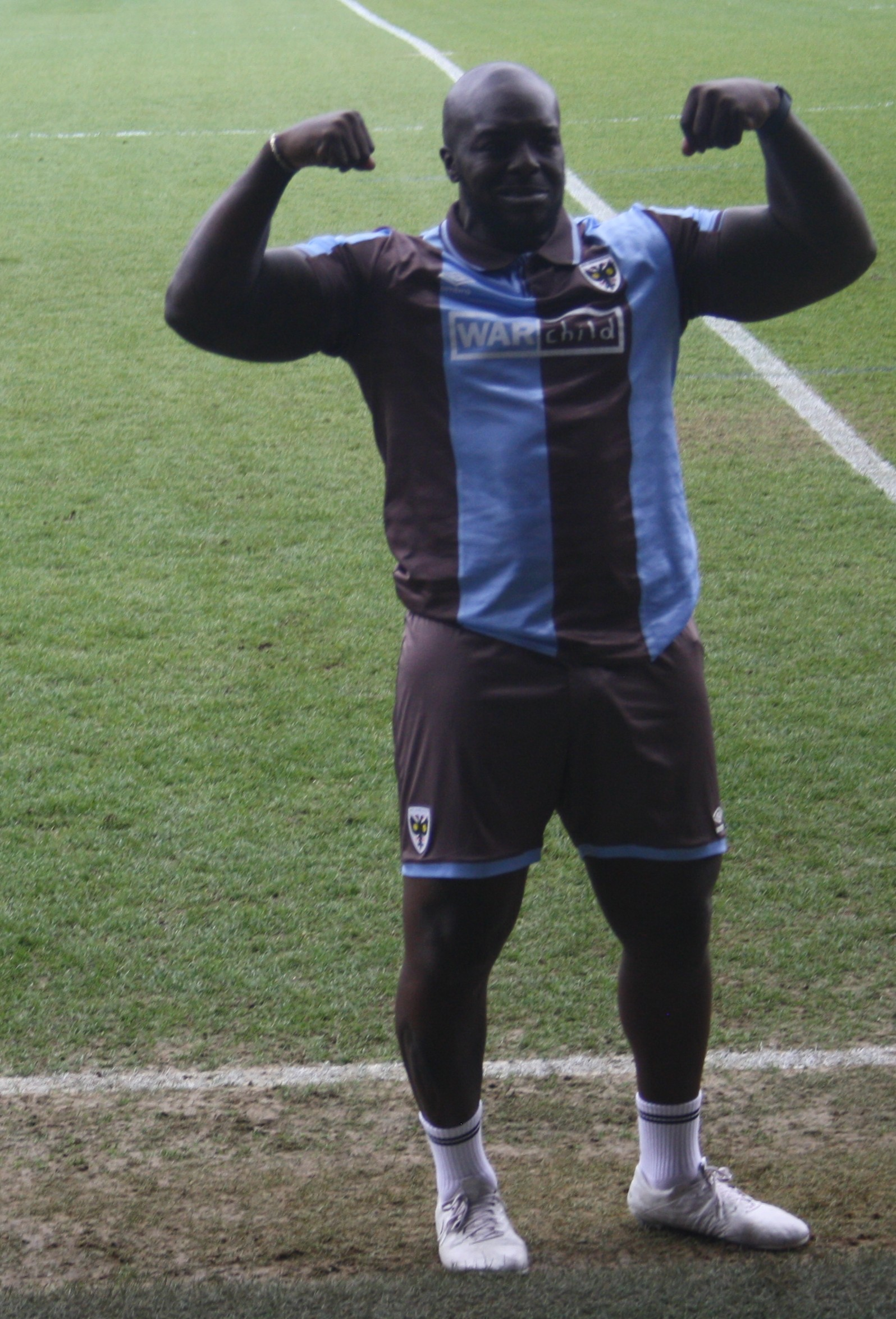
Akinfenwa playing in Will Nightingale's testimonial match on 1 June 2025, doing his signature pose.

In March 2022, Akinfenwa was set to make his professional wrestling debut at Progress 146. He was supposed to tag with Anthony Ogogo against Malik and Kosta Konstantino, but pulled out at the last minute for unspecified reasons.

On 11 July 2022, Akinfenwa appeared in a pre-season friendly for Isthmian League North Division side Hashtag United against Walthamstow. Akinfenwa featured for the entire first half before being substituted during the half-time break. Hashtag United confirmed that Akinfenwa would not be joining the team full-time due to his personal schedule and potential injury issues.

In March 2023, Akinfenwa came out of retirement and joined Faversham Town of the Isthmian League. He made his debut against Lancing on 11 March 2023. On 25 March 2023, Akinfenwa had a 94th minute penalty saved by outfield player Harrison Pont on his home debut for Faversham, against rivals Sittingbourne.

In 2025, Akinfenwa was named as part of the line-up for the television show Celebrity SAS: Who Dares Wins.

== Personal life ==
Although Akinfenwa observed Ramadan as a child, he is now a Christian. He is a close friend of Clarke Carlisle, his former teammate at Northampton Town.

Akinfenwa has been ranked as the strongest footballer in the world in various editions of the FIFA videogame series. In September 2014 he was invited to attend the launch party for FIFA 15 alongside various celebrities and Premier League players, including Rio Ferdinand, George Groves and Lethal Bizzle. Akinfenwa reportedly weighs around 100 kilograms (16 st; 220 lb) and can bench press 180 kg (28 st; 400 lb).

He runs a clothing label called Beast Mode On which plays on his strong man reputation. His autobiography The Beast: My Story was published by Headline Publishing in 2017.

== Career statistics ==
Appearances and goals by club, season and competition
Club	Season	League			National Cup (Note: Appearances in Lithuanian Cup, Welsh Cup and FA Cup)		League Cup		EFL Trophy		Play-offs (Note: Appearances in League One play-offs and League Two play-offs)		Europe (Note: Appearances in UEFA Cup and UEFA Champions League)		Total	
Club	Season	Division	Apps	Goals	Apps	Goals	Apps	Goals	Apps	Goals	Apps	Goals	Apps	Goals	Apps	Goals
Atlantas	2001	A Lyga	18	4	2	1	—		—		—		2	0	22	5
Atlantas	2002	A Lyga	4	1	1	0	—		—		—		0	0	5	1
Atlantas	Total		22	5	3	1	—		—		—		2	0	27	6
Laisvė Šilutė	2002	I Lyga	0	0	1	1	—		—		—		—		1	1
Barry Town	2002–03	Welsh Premier League	8	6	1	0	—		—		—		—		9	6
Barry Town	2003–04	Welsh Premier League	1	0	0	0	—		—		—		2	0	3	0
Barry Town	Total		9	6	1	0	—		—		—		2	0	12	6
Boston United	2003–04	Third Division	3	0	0	0	0	0	1	1	—		—		4	1
Leyton Orient	2003–04	Third Division	1	0	1	0	0	0	0	0	—		—		2	0
Rushden & Diamonds	2003–04	Second Division	0	0	0	0	0	0	0	0	—		—		0	0
Doncaster Rovers	2003–04	Third Division	9	4	0	0	0	0	0	0	—		—		9	4
Torquay United	2004–05	League One	37	14	1	0	1	0	2	2	—		—		41	16
Swansea City	2005–06	League One	34	9	1	0	1	1	6	5	2	0	—		44	15
Swansea City	2006–07	League One	25	5	4	1	1	0	1	0	—		—		31	6
Swansea City	Total		59	14	5	1	2	1	7	5	2	0	—		75	21
Millwall	2007–08	League One	7	0	2	0	0	0	0	0	—		—		9	0
Northampton Town	2007–08	League One	15	7	0	0	0	0	0	0	—		—		15	7
Northampton Town	2008–09	League One	33	13	0	0	3	2	0	0	—		—		36	15
Northampton Town	2009–10	League Two	40	17	2	0	1	0	1	0	—		—		44	17
Northampton Town	Total		88	37	2	0	4	2	1	0	—		—		95	39
Gillingham	2010–11	League Two	44	11	1	0	1	0	0	0	—		—		46	11
Northampton Town	2011–12	League Two	39	18	1	0	1	0	1	0	—		—		42	18
Northampton Town	2012–13	League Two	41	16	2	0	2	0	3	1	3	0	—		51	17
Northampton Town	Total		80	34	3	0	3	0	4	1	3	0	—		93	35
Gillingham	2013–14	League One	34	10	2	0	1	0	0	0	—		—		37	10
AFC Wimbledon	2014–15	League Two	45	13	4	1	1	0	2	1	—		—		52	15
AFC Wimbledon	2015–16	League Two	38	6	0	0	1	0	0	0	3	2	—		42	8
AFC Wimbledon	Total		83	19	4	1	1	0	2	1	3	2	—		94	23
Wycombe Wanderers	2016–17	League Two	42	12	4	2	1	0	5	4	—		—		52	18
Wycombe Wanderers	2017–18	League Two	42	17	3	1	1	0	0	0	—		—		46	18
Wycombe Wanderers	2018–19	League One	36	7	0	0	2	1	1	0	—		—		39	8
Wycombe Wanderers	2019–20	League One	32	10	2	0	1	0	1	0	3	0	—		39	10
Wycombe Wanderers	2020–21	Championship	33	1	2	0	0	0	—		—		—		35	1
Wycombe Wanderers	2021–22	League One	34	5	1	0	2	1	0	0	2	0	—		39	6
Wycombe Wanderers	Total		219	52	12	3	7	2	7	4	5	0	—		250	61
Faversham Town	2022–23	IL South East Division	2	0	0	0	0	0	—		—		—		2	0
Career total			697	206	38	7	21	5	24	14	13	2	4	0	797	234

== Honours ==
FK Atlantas

- Lithuanian Football Cup: 2000–01

Barry Town

- Welsh Premier League: 2002–03
- Welsh Cup: 2002–03

Swansea City

- Football League Trophy: 2005–06

AFC Wimbledon

- Football League Two play-offs: 2016

Wycombe Wanderers

- EFL League One play-offs: 2020

Individual

- EFL League Two Player of the Month: November 2012
- EFL Team of the Season: 2017–18
- PFA Team of the Year: 2017–18 League Two
- Torquay United Player of the Year: 2004–05
- Northampton Town Player of the Year: 2009–10
- AFC Wimbledon Player of the Year: 2014–15
- Wycombe Wanderers Player of the Season: 2016–17, 2017–18
- Sir Tom Finney Award: 2023
