= Sakuona Plikiai =

FK Sakuona Plikiai
- Full name: Futbolo klubas Sakuona
- Founded: 1998; 28 years ago
- Capacity: klaipėdos DDA, Klaipėda
- Chairman: Česlovas Kavarza
- Manager: Česlovas Kavarza
- League: LFF III Lyga (Klaipėda)
- 2025: 5th
Home colours	Away colours

FK Sakuona is a Lithuanian football team from Plikiai in Klaipėda region.

== History ==
The first football club in Plikiai was established in 1919 under the name SV Plicken.

The current club was established in 1988 and called Švyturys, by the name of kolkhoz where it was located. After the independence, the club was renamed to SK Plikiai in 1992. Recently, for sponsorship reasons the club bore names Sakuona and Rūgpienių kaimas.

FK Plikiai won 2001/2002 the LFF III Lyga championship and were promoted to the LFF II Lyga. In 2009/2010 season FK Plikiai made headlines by reaching the LFF Cup quarterfinals having eliminated famous FK Žalgiris..

== Previous names ==
- 1988 – Švyturys
- 1992 – Liverpulis
- 1998 – SK Plikiai
- 2002 – Sakuona

== Achievements ==
- Winners of LFF III Lyga
  - 2001–22, 2018, 2019, 2021
- Runners up of LFF II Lyga
  - 2006, 2007–08, 2010–11
