= Maksym Morozov =

Ukrainian footballer

Personal information
- Full name: Maksym Alentynovych Morozov
- Date of birth: 28 September 1978 (age 48)
- Place of birth: Kerch, Crimean Oblast, Ukrainian SSR
- Height: 1.80 m (5 ft 11 in)
- Position: Midfielder

Youth career
- DYuSSh Kerch

Senior career*
Years	Team	Apps	(Gls)
1995	Ocean Kerch	6	(0)
1995–1998	Shakhtar-2 Donetsk	68	(1)
1998–1999	Yavir Sumy	27	(2)
2000	Metallurg Lipetsk	19	(1)
2001	Metallurg Krasnoyarsk	15	(0)
2002	Salyut-Energiya Belgorod	12	(3)
2003	Fakel Voronezh	25	(1)
2004	Darida Minsk Raion	12	(1)
2005	Mika Ashtarak	21	(4)
2006	Atlantas Klaipėda	32	(13)
2007	Salyut-Energiya Belgorod	38	(11)
2008	Metallurg-Kuzbass Novokuznetsk	30	(2)
2009	Mika Yerevan	14	(0)
- * Club domestic league appearances and goals

Maksym Alentynovych Morozov (Russian: Максим Алентинович Морозов) (born 28 September 1978) is a retired Ukrainian footballer.
