= Edgaras Mastianica =

Lithuanian footballer

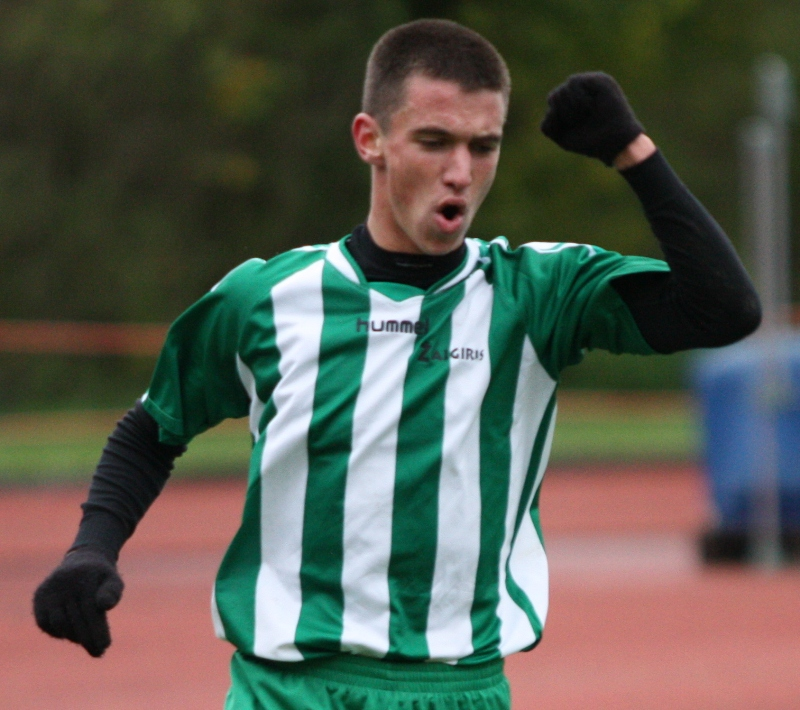

Personal information
- Date of birth: 26 October 1988 (age 38)
- Place of birth: Lithuanian SSR, Soviet Union
- Height: 1.74 m (5 ft 9 in)
- Position: Midfielder

Youth career
- 2005: Vėtra
- 2006–2007: Žalgiris Vilnius

Senior career*
Years	Team	Apps	(Gls)
2008–2011	Žalgiris Vilnius	71	(5)
2012	Atlantas	19	(0)
2012	Sillamäe Kalev	17	(0)
2013	Granitas Klaipėda	25	(18)
2014	Dnepr Mogilev	14	(1)
2015–2016	Utenis Utena	50	(9)
2018–2019	Peimari United		

International career^{‡}
2010	Lithuania U21	2	(0)
- * Club domestic league appearances and goals as of 14 December 2016 ‡ National team caps and goals as of 14 April 2014

Edgaras Mastianica (born 26 October 1988) is a Lithuanian former professional footballer who most recently played for Peimari United in Finland.
