= 1998–99 A Lyga =

A Lyga
- Season: 1998–99
- Champions: FK Zalgiris
- Relegated: Zalgiris-2 Vilnius; Kauno Jegarai; FK Lokomotyvas; Mastis Telsiai
- UEFA Champions League: FK Zalgiris
- UEFA Cup: Kareda Siauliai; FBK Kaunas
- UEFA Intertoto Cup: FK Ekranas

The Lithuanian A Lyga 1998–99 was the ninth season of top-tier football in Lithuania. The season started on 10 July 1998 and ended on 13 June 1999. 13 teams participated and FK Žalgiris Vilnius won the championship.

== Final table ==
Pos	Team	Pld	W	D	L	GF	GA	GD	Pts	Qualification or relegation
1	Žalgiris (C)	23	18	5	0	68	8	+60	59	Qualification to Champions League first qualifying round
2	Kareda Šiauliai	23	18	4	1	67	11	+56	58	Qualification to UEFA Cup qualifying round
3	FBK Kaunas	23	18	3	2	57	14	+43	57	Qualification to UEFA Cup qualifying round
4	Ekranas	23	12	5	6	45	20	+25	41	Qualification to Intertoto Cup first round
5	Inkaras	23	11	4	8	34	27	+7	37	
6	Atlantas	23	8	4	11	34	33	+1	28	
7	Banga	23	7	5	11	18	30	−12	26	
8	Nevėžis	23	7	4	12	17	36	−19	25	
9	Dainava	23	8	1	14	24	53	−29	25	
10	Žalgiris-2 (Note: Žalgiris-2 were demoted to the lower league due to the regulations of LFF, as were a reserve team of Žalgiris.) (R)	23	6	3	14	25	60	−35	21	Relegation to 1 Lyga
11	Jėgeriai (Note: Jėgeriai were demoted to the lower league due to the regulations of LFF, as were a reserve team of FBK Kaunas.) (R)	23	6	2	15	22	48	−26	20	Relegation to 1 Lyga
12	Lokomotyvas (Note: Lokomotyvas were won the play-off, but later were withdrew from the league and dissolved.) (R)	23	4	0	19	12	47	−35	12	Qualification to Relegation play-offs
13	Mastis (R)	12	1	0	11	4	40	−36	3	Withdrawn and relegation to lower league (Note: Mastis were withdrew from the league after twelve rounds.)

Source: RSSSF.com
(C) Champions; (R) Relegated

== Results ==
Home \ Away	ATL	BAN	DAI	EKR	FBK	INK	JĖG	KAR	LOK	MAS	NEV	ŽAL	ŽL2
Atlantas		0–1	1–3	1–1	1–2	3–1	7–1	0–3	3–1		0–1	1–2	2–0
Banga	0–0		2–0	0–2	2–1	0–0	1–2	1–2	2–0	3–1	2–1	1–3	1–1
Dainava	2–1	0–0		0–5	0–1	1–2	0–1	0–2	2–0		2–3	1–3	2–1
Ekranas	0–0	4–0	3–1		1–2	2–0	1–0	2–2	2–1		2–2	-:+ (Note: The match between Ekranas and Žalgiris was rated with a goalless win for Žalgiris.)	4–0
FBK Kaunas	1–0	1–0	12–0	2–1		4–2	3–0	1–1	2–0		3–0	1–1	5–1
Inkaras	2–1	2–0	2–1	0–3	0–2		0–0	1–3	2–0	5–1	3–0	0–2	3–0
Jėgeriai	1–3	0–0	2–3	1–2	0–5	0–4		1–2	3–1	3–0	2–1	0–1	0–2
Kareda Šiauliai	6–0	5–1	3–0	1–1	2–0	2–1	4–0		7–0	9–0	2–0	0–0	3–1
Lokomotyvas	1–5	0–1	0–2	0–1	1–2	0–1	1–0	0–1		1–0	0–1	0–1	0–3
Mastis	0–1		0–1	0–8	0–1							0–6	2–1
Nevėžis	0–2	1–0	0–1	1–0	0–2	0–0	2–1	0–3	1–2	1–0		1–1	0–0
Žalgiris	2–0	3–0	5–0	3–0	1–1	1–1	3–0	1–0	5–1		6–0		8–0
Žalgiris-2	2–2	1–0	4–2	3–0	0–3	1–2	2–4	0–4	0–2		2–1	0–10	

Legend: Blue = home team win; Yellow = draw; Red = away team win.

== Relegation play-off ==
Team 1	Agg.	Team 2	1st leg	2nd leg
Lietava Jonava	4–5	Lokomotyvas	3–0	1–5
