= Robertas Ringys =

Lithuanian footballer

Personal information
- Date of birth: 2 September 1979 (age 47)
- Height: 1.74 m (5 ft 8 1/2 in)
- Position: Midfielder

Senior career*
Years	Team	Apps	(Gls)
1996–1999	FK Atlantas	34	(4)
2000–2001	FK Žalgiris Vilnius	57	(5)
2002	FBK Kaunas	0	(0)
2002	FC Krylia Sovetov Samara	0	(0)
2003	FK Žalgiris Vilnius	10	(1)
2003–2004	FK Liepājas Metalurgs	4	(0)
2004–2005	FK Atlantas	28	(1)

International career
2001–2002	Lithuania	4	(0)
- * Club domestic league appearances and goals as of 1 January 2009

Robertas Ringys (born 2 September 1979) is a Lithuanian retired professional footballer. He played 3 games in the 2002 UEFA Intertoto Cup for FC Krylia Sovetov Samara.
