= Simas Skinderis =

Lithuanian footballer

Personal information
- Date of birth: 17 February 1981 (age 45)
- Place of birth: Panevėžys, Lithuanian SSR
- Height: 1.83 m (6 ft 0 in)
- Position: Goalkeeper

Team information
- Current team: FK Nevėžis

Senior career*
Years	Team	Apps	(Gls)
1997–2000	Ekranas	18	(0)
2001	Dainava Alytus	16	(0)
2002	Inkaras Kaunas	12	(0)
2002–2003	Atlantas	29	(0)
2004	Šilutė	13	(0)
2004	Torpedo-SKA Minsk	11	(0)
2005–2006	Naftan Navapolatsk	31	(0)
2007	Akzhayik	14	(0)
2009–2011	Minsk	54	(0)
2012	Belshina Babruysk	17	(0)
2013	Slavia Mozyr	13	(0)
2014–2016	Haradzieja	29	(0)
2017	Nevėžis	1	(0)
- * Club domestic league appearances and goals as of 18 December 2016

Simas Skinderis (born 17 February 1981) is a retired Lithuanian professional footballer. He has played as goalkeeper in clubs in Lithuania, Kazakhstan and Belarus.

He ended his career in 2017 while playing for Nevėžis in the LFF I Lyga. Skinderis has since resided in Belarus since 2009 and is a coach for a private football academy.

In a January 2021 interview with Russian news portal Tribuna, Skinderis expressed support for the regime of Alexander Lukashenko and made controversial statements about the protest movement of 2020-2021, saying that "Belarusians have a slightly kolkhoz-like mentality and you have to treat them more harshly" and that "order needs to be preserved and no gay-parades should be started etc". His remarks were criticized by sports journalist Alexander Ivulin.
