= Plikiai =

Town in Lithuania

- Town
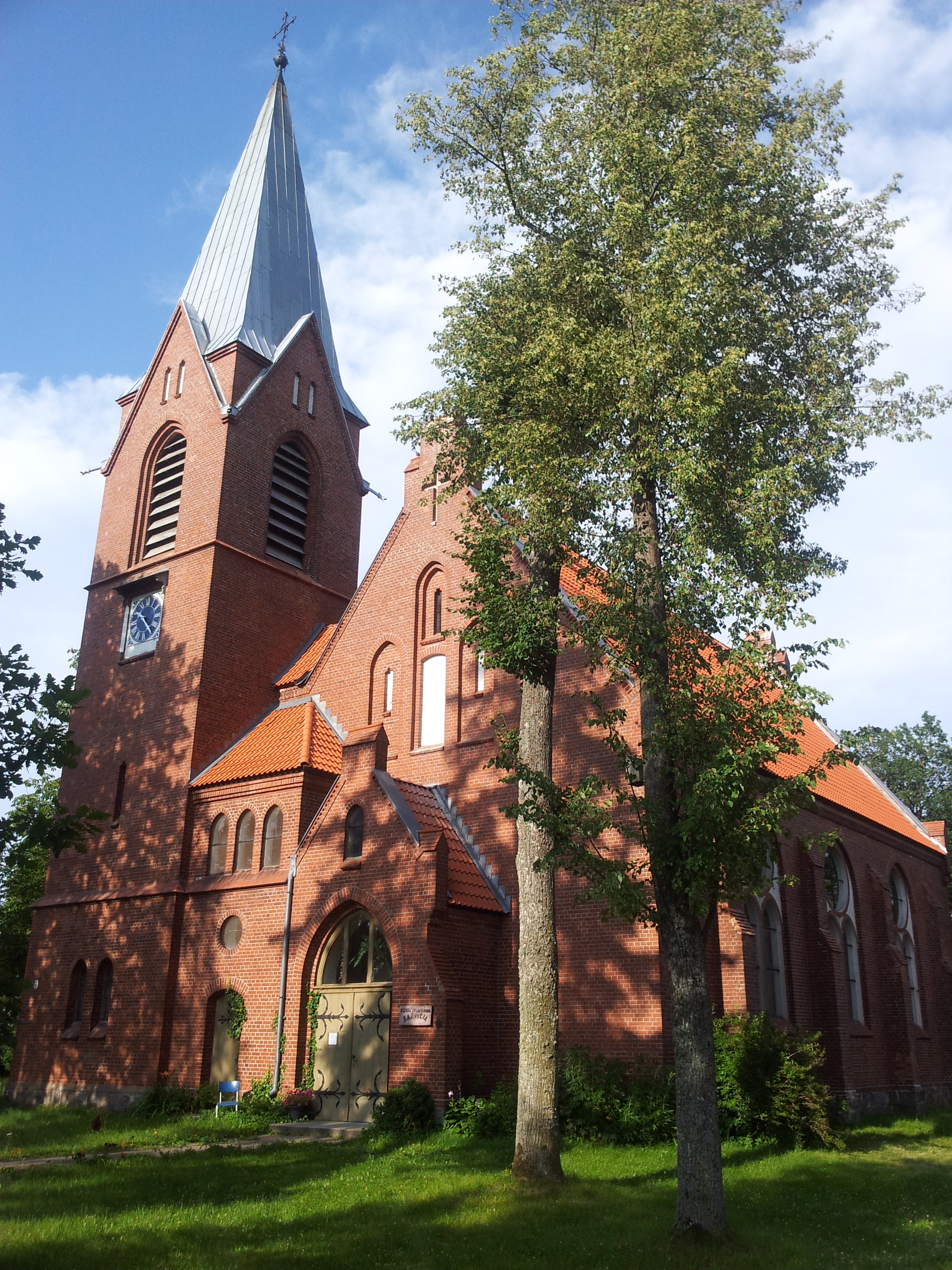
- Plikiai Evangelical Lutheran Church

- Location of Plikiai
- Coordinates: 55°47′20″N 21°16′40″E
- Country: Lithuania
- County: Klaipėda County
- Municipality: Klaipėda district municipality
- Eldership: Kretingalė eldership
- Capital of: Kretingalė eldership

Population (2011)
  - Total: 607
- Time zone: UTC+2 (EET)
  - Summer (DST): UTC+3 (EEST)

Plikiai is a town in western Lithuania, in the ethnocultural region of Lithuania Minor.

== History ==
In the 1880s, Plikiai had a population of 208, Lithuanian by ethnicity, and Lutheran by confession. A Lutheran parish was founded in 1891 and consisted of 25 villages.
