= KS Polonia Wilno =

Lithuanian football club

- Full name: Klub Sportowy Polonia Wilno
- Nicknames: Biało-Czerwoni (transl. The White and Reds); Duma Wilna (transl. Pride of Vilnius)
- Founded: 18 March 1990; 35 years ago
- Dissolved: 2014
- Ground: LFF Stadium
- Capacity: 5422
- Website: Klub Sportowy Polonia Wilno on Facebook
Home colours	Away colours

KS Polonia Wilno (Lithuanian: FK Polonija Vilnius) was a football club based in Vilnius, Lithuania. Polonia was formed in 1990 by Poles from Vilnius.

== History ==
The club was founded on March 18, 1990, as Klub Sportowy Polaków na Litwie „Polonia” (transl. Sports Club of Lithuanian Poles; Polonia denoting the Polish diaspora and Wilno being the Polish name for Vilnius). The club's first president was Janusz Jaszczanin. The name of the club's hometown, Vilnius, was subsequently added as the Lithuanian authorities forbade the club to cover all of Lithuania. In 1999 the club was called Ardena, but in 2000 returned to the name Polonia. In the 2010 season the club participated in the fourth tier, finishing fourth. The following season, the club competed in the II Lyga, the third tier in the league pyramid. The team led, by Wiktor Filipowicz, took first place and was promoted to the I Lyga. The club also competed in the Lithuanian Football Cup, reaching the quarter finals. In the 2012 season, Polonia took off in the I Lyga, where at the end of the season they finished 5th place, and ended in the last 16 of the Lithuanian Football Cup. On October 13, 2012, the team played a friendly match against Polonia Warsaw at the invitation of the Warsaw fans. In the following season, the club was on the verge of bankruptcy. Finally, on April 9, 2014, Polonia Wilno withdrew from the League, which is equivalent to its dissolution. The cause was financial problems.

Name chronology:

- 1990-1993: Polonia Wilno
- 1994: Polonia-Janusz Wilno
- 1995-1998: Polonia Wilno
- 1999: Ardena Wilno
- since 2000: Polonia Wilno

== Honours ==
The club's honours:

- I Lyga (II)
  - 5 th: 2012–13
- Lithuanian Football Cup
  - 1/8 finals: 2011–12
