= FK Kruoja Pakruojis =

Lithuanian association football club

- Full name: Kruoja Pakruojo futbolo klubas 2001
- Founded: 2001
- Dissolved: 2016
- Ground: Pakruojis stadium, Pakruojis
- Capacity: 2,000
Home colours	Away colours

FK Kruoja Pakruojis was a Lithuanian football club from the city of Pakruojis. The team first played in the A Lyga, Lithuania's top football division, in 2009. They were promoted after FBK Kaunas and Atlantas Klaipėda voluntarily withdrew. The team's colours are yellow and blue. The club plays at Pakruojis stadium (capacity 2000). In August 2015, Kruoja withdrew from A Lyga and dissolved due to recurring allegations of match fixing, among other reasons.

== Honours ==
=== League ===
- A Lyga
  - Runners-up: 2014
  - 4th place: 2012

=== Cup ===
Round of 32: 2006, 2009-10

== European record ==
Season	Competition	Round	Opponent	Home	Away	Aggregate
2013–14	UEFA Europa League	1Q	(Belarus) Dinamo Minsk	0–3	0–5	0–8
2015–16	UEFA Europa League	1Q	(Poland) Jagiellonia Białystok	0–1	0–8	0–9

Notes

- 1Q: First qualifying round

== Managers ==
- (Lithuania) Aidas Dambrauskas (July 1, 2009–10)
- (Lithuania) Albertas Klimavičius (Jan 1, 2011 – Aug 7, 2011)
- (Lithuania) Aidas Dambrauskas (2012)
- (France) Sébastien Roques (Jan 1, 2013 – March 20, 2013)
- (Kazakhstan) Vladimir Cheburin (Feb 21, 2014–Dec, 2014)
- (Portugal) Divaldo Da Silva (Jan 2015 – Jun 2015)
- (Lithuania) Aidas Dambrauskas (July 1, 2015– Aug 2015)
