= FK Ekranas =

Football club in Lithuania

Panevėžio Ekranas
- Full name: Football Club Ekranas
- Nickname: Mėlynai Raudoni (The Blue-Reds)
- Founded: 1964; 62 years ago 2020; 6 years ago
- Dissolved: 2015; 11 years ago
- Ground: Žemynos stadionas
- Chairman: Tomas Malinauskas
- Manager: Darius Maciulevičius
- League: II Lyga
- 2026: I Lyga, 15th of 16 (relegated)
Home colours	Away colours

Panevėžio Ekranas is a Lithuanian football club, from the Lithuanian city of Panevėžys. It won 7 top-tier champion and 5 national cup titles throughout its existence.

== History ==
The club was founded in 1964 and for 24 years competed in the top tier of Lithuanian football. However, at the end of 2014 season the club ran into financial difficulties, failed to meet admission criteria to A Lyga for the 2015 season and was subsequently declared bankrupt. A new club FK Panevėžys was formed to represent the city of Panevėžys, which managed to pass licensing criteria for the 2015 I Lyga season. FK Ekranas was declared bankrupt in 2016. In 2020 FK Ekranas was restored. They are currently at the 2nd tier of Lithuanian football.

FK Ekranas won Lithuanian championships in 1985 (Soviet Lithuania), 1993, 2005, 2008, 2009, 2010, 2011 and 2012, the Lithuanian Cup in 1985 (Soviet Lithuania), 1998, 2000, 2010 and 2011 and the Lithuanian Super Cup in 1998, 2006, 2010, 2011 and 2012.

On 5 November 2004, before the A Lyga champion-deciding match against FBK Kaunas, the club was controversially expelled from the top division by the National Football Club Association (NFKA) for alleged match fixing, but reinstated a day later.

In August 2006 FK Ekranas won the first Baltic Champion's Cup tournament in Liepāja after beating Estonian champions TVMK Tallinn 6–4 and drawing with the home side Liepājas Metalurgs 1–1.

In 2015, the club filed for bankruptcy and was dissolved following the unsuccessful attempts to save the team.

== Honours ==
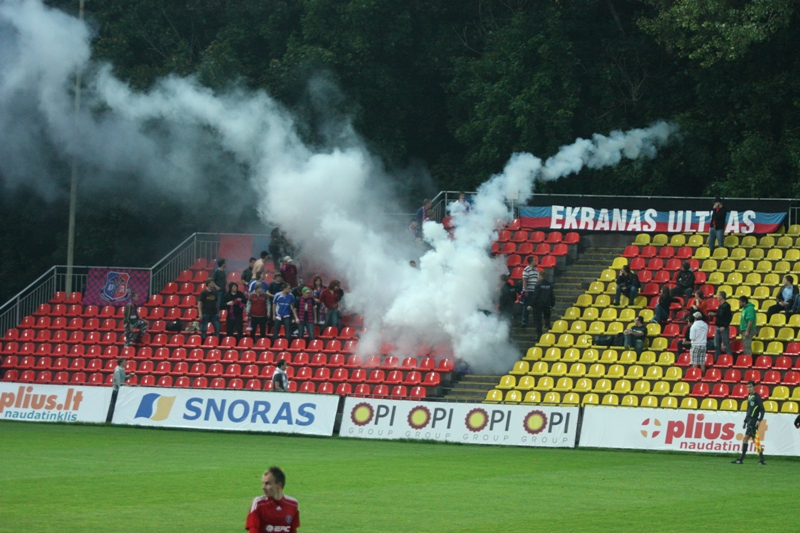
Ekranas fans. Pirmoji Armada

- A Lyga
  - Winners (7): 1992–93, 2005, 2008, 2009, 2010, 2011, 2012
  - Runners-up (4): 1990, 2003, 2004, 2006
- II Lyga
  - Winners (1): 2021
- Lithuanian Cup
  - Winners (5): 1985, 1998, 2000, 2010, 2011
  - Runners-up (5): 1972, 1994, 2003, 2006, 2012
- Lithuanian Super Cup
  - Winners (4): 1998, 2006, 2010, 2011
  - Runners-up (1): 2009
- Lithuanian SSR Championship
  - Winners (1): 1985

== Participation in Lithuanian Championships ==
Year	Division	Position	Year	Division	Position	Year	Division	Position
1991	A Lyga	4th	2000	A Lyga	4th	2010	A Lyga	1st
1991–92	A Lyga	5th	2001	A Lyga	4th	2011	A Lyga	1st
1992–93	A Lyga	1st	2002	A Lyga	3rd	2012	A Lyga	1st
1993–94	A Lyga	3rd	2003	A Lyga	2nd	2013	A Lyga	3rd
1994–95	A Lyga	8th	2004	A Lyga	2nd	2014	A Lyga	6th
1995–96	A Lyga	7th	2005	A Lyga	1st			
1996–97	A Lyga	5th	2006	A Lyga	2nd			
1997–98	A Lyga	3rd	2007	A Lyga	3rd			
1998–99	A Lyga	4th	2008	A Lyga	1st			
1999	A Lyga	5th	2009	A Lyga	1st			

== UEFA club competition results ==
Updated 23 July 2013

Competition	P	W	D	L	GF	GA
Champions League	20	5	3	12	19	40
UEFA Cup / UEFA Europa League	18	7	2	9	17	36
Cup Winners Cup	2	0	1	1	4	5
Intertoto Cup	8	2	1	5	7	12
Total	48	14	7	27	47	93

Season	Cup	Rnd	Opponent	Home	Away	Aggregate
1993–94	Champions League	1Q	(Malta) Floriana	0–1	0–1	0–2
1998–99	Cup Winners Cup	1Q	(Cyprus) Apollon Limassol	1–2	3–3	4–5
1999	Intertoto Cup	1R	(Romania) Ceahlăul Piatra Neamț	0–1	0–1	0–2
2000–01	UEFA Cup	Q	(Belgium) Lierse S.K.	0–3	0–4	0–7
2001	Intertoto Cup	1R	(Slovakia) FC Artmedia Bratislava	1–1	1–1	2–2*
2003–04	UEFA Cup	Q	(Hungary) Debreceni VSC	1–1	1–2	2–3
2004–05	UEFA Cup	1Q	(Luxembourg) F91 Dudelange	1–0	2–1	3–1
2004–05	UEFA Cup	2Q	(Norway) Odd Grenland	2–1	1–3	3–4
2005–06	UEFA Cup	1Q	(Republic of Ireland) Cork City	0–2	1–0	1–2
2006–07	Champions League	1Q	(Albania) Elbasani	3–0	0–1	3–1
2006–07	Champions League	2Q	(Croatia) Dinamo Zagreb	1–4	2–5	3–9
2007–08	UEFA Cup	1Q	(Faroe Islands) B36 Tórshavn	3–2	3–1	6–3
2007–08	UEFA Cup	2Q	(Norway) Vålerenga	1–1	0–6	1–7
2008	Intertoto Cup	1R	(Estonia) Narva Trans	1–0	3–0	4–0
2008	Intertoto Cup	2R	(Norway) Rosenborg	1–3	0–4	1–7
2009–10	Champions League	2Q	(Azerbaijan) Baku	2–2	2–4	4–6
2010–11	Champions League	2Q	(Finland) HJK Helsinki	1–0	0–2	1–2
2011–12	Champions League	2Q	(Malta) Valletta	1–0	3–2	4–2
2011–12	Champions League	3Q	(Belarus) BATE Borisov	0–0	1–3	1–3
2011–12	Europa League	Play-Off	(Israel) Hapoel Tel Aviv	1–0	0–4	1–4
2012–13	Champions League	2Q	(Republic of Ireland) Shamrock Rovers	2–1	0–0	2–1
2012–13	Champions League	3Q	(Belgium) Anderlecht	0–6	0–5	0–11
2012–13	Europa League	Play-Off	(Romania) Steaua București	0–2	0–3	0–5
2013–14	Champions League	2Q	(Iceland) Fimleikafélag Hafnarfjarðar	0–1	1–2	1–3
2014–15	Europa League	1Q	(Northern Ireland) Crusaders	1–2	1–3	2–5

*FC Artmedia Bratislava victory after the penalty shootout.

1Q – 1st Qualifying Round; 2Q – 2nd Qualifying Round; 1R – 1st Round; 2R – 2nd Round

== Famous players ==
FK Ekranas players famous internationally and legends from the club or Lithuania. Players whose name is listed in bold represented their countries while playing for Ekranas.

- (Lithuania) **Marius Stankevičius** (1998–2001)
- (Lithuania) Edgaras Česnauskis (2000–2003)
- (Lithuania) Deividas Česnauskis (1997–2000)
- (Lithuania) **Saulius Mikoliūnas** (2003)
- (Lithuania) **Arūnas Klimavičius** (2000–2007)
- (Lithuania) Ignas Dedura (2011–2013)
- (Lithuania) **Andrius Velička** (2011–2012)

=== Notable players ===
- (Lithuania) Vytautas Černiauskas
- (Lithuania) Emilijus Zubas
- (Lithuania) Vykintas Slivka
- (Lithuania) Dainius Glaveckas
- (Lithuania) Andrius Jokšas
- (Lithuania) Vaidas Slavickas
- (Lithuania) Irmantas Stumbrys
- (Lithuania) Mantas Savėnas
- (Lithuania) Edvinas Girdvainis
- (Serbia) Dušan Matović
- (Serbia) Marko Anđelković
- (Serbia) Dejan Đenić
- (Australia) Aleksandar Susnjar
- (Brazil) Elivelto
- (Latvia) Vīts Rimkus
- (Estonia) Taavi Rähn
- (Moldova) Serghei Pogreban
- (Canada) Stephen Ademolu
- (Lithuania) Deimantas Bička
- (Lithuania) Marius Skinderis
- (Lithuania) Simas Skinderis
- (Lithuania) Vaidotas Šlekys
- (Lithuania) Dominykas Galkevicius
- (Lithuania) Mantas Samusiovas
- (Lithuania) Ramūnas Radavičius

== Managerial history ==
From–to	Names
1964–76	(Lithuania) Algimantas Balilionis
1972–75	(Lithuania) Fulgentas Bižys
1980–89	(Lithuania) Mindaugas Kaušpėdas
1989–07	(Lithuania) Virginijus Liubšys
2007	(Lithuania) Saulius Širmelis
2007–08	(Lithuania) Darius Butkus
20 July 2008 – 30 June 2009	(Lithuania) Saulius Širmelis
2 June 2009 – 25 April 2013	(Lithuania) Valdas Urbonas
May 2013 – November 2014	(Lithuania) Valdas Dambrauskas
