= 2009 A Lyga =

A Lyga
- Season: 2009
- Champions: Ekranas; 5th league title
- Champions League: Ekranas
- Europa League: Sūduva; Šiauliai; Tauras
- Baltic League: Ekranas; Sūduva; Šiauliai; Tauras; Banga
- Matches played: 112
- Goals scored: 302 (2.7 per match)
- Top goalscorer: Valdas Trakys (20)
- Biggest home win: Sūduva 6-0 Kruoja
- Biggest away win: LKKA ir Teledema 2-7 Sūduva; Kruoja 0-5 Šiauliai; Banga 0-5 Vėtra
- Highest scoring: LKKA ir Teledema 2-7 Sūduva

The Lithuanian A Lyga 2009 was the 20th season of top-tier football in Lithuania. The season started on 4 April 2009 and ended on 31 October 2009. Ekranas successfully defended their title.

== Promotion and relegation ==
Šilutė were relegated to the I Lyga after finishing the 2008 season in last place. They were replaced by I Lyga champions Tauras.

== Pre-season controversy ==
The Lithuanian top football division was shaken to its core after FBK Kaunas and Atlantas withdrew their participation on 20 March 2009. Both teams cited serious differences with the Lithuanian Football Federation over the way the league has been led in the past as a reason. This was the second blow to the league within two weeks after Žalgiris were denied a license for this season because of excessive financial problems on 6 March 2009.

As a consequence, the chairman of the National Football Clubs' Association (NFKA), Gintaras Ugianskis, resigned from his post. Further, the organization of the league was put into the hands of the LFF.

The 2009 A Lyga consists of eight teams chosen from all teams of both A Lyga and I Lyga. Teams with a higher 2008 season rank had a preference to enter. Clubs being interested in a participation could submit their application until 26 March 2009.

On 27 March 2009, the LFF announced the three replacement teams. Banga Gargždai, LKKA ir Teledema Kaunas and Kruoja Pakruojis were appointed to the league. Further, the LFF classified FBK Kaunas and Atlantas to play in the third-tier II Lyga because of "unethical conduct and other irregularities" while Žalgiris were granted a license for the second-level I Lyga.

== Clubs ==
Location of teams in the A Lyga 2009

Club	Location	Stadium	Capacity	Current manager
Banga	Gargždai	Gargždai Stadium	800	(Lithuania) Vytautas Jančiauskas
Ekranas	Panevėžys	Aukštaitija Stadium	4,000	(Lithuania) Valdas Urbonas
Kruoja	Pakruojis	Pakruojis Stadium	1,000	(Lithuania) Aidas Dambrauskas
LKKA ir Teledema	Kaunas	Kaunas LŽŪU stadium	1,000	(Lithuania) Viačislavas Novikovas
Sūduva	Marijampolė	Sūduva Stadium	6,260	(Lithuania) Gedeminas Jarmalavičius
Šiauliai	Šiauliai	Savivaldybė Stadium	2,430	(Lithuania) Deivis Kančelskis
Tauras	Tauragė	Vytauto Stadium	1,600	(Latvia) Jurijs Popkovs
Vėtra	Vilnius	Vėtra Stadium	5,300	(Lithuania) Virginijus Liubšys

== League table ==
Pos	Team	Pld	W	D	L	GF	GA	GD	Pts	Qualification
1	Ekranas (C)	28	18	9	1	58	20	+38	63	Qualification to Champions League second qualifying round
2	Vėtra (Note: Vėtra were denied the UEFA license for the 2010–11 season and therefore will not represent Lithuania in the UEFA Europa League. Since the finalists of the 2009–10 Lithuanian Football Cup are Vėtra and Champions League-qualified Ekranas, all Europa League spots were awarded to teams based on their league positions. Therefore, Sūduva and Šiauliai qualified for the second, while Tauras qualified for the first qualifying round of the UEFA Europa League.)	28	16	9	3	55	22	+33	57	
3	Sūduva	28	14	11	3	55	22	+33	53	Qualification to Europa League second qualifying round
4	Šiauliai	28	13	3	12	40	34	+6	42	Qualification to Europa League second qualifying round
5	Tauras	28	10	8	10	26	22	+4	38	Qualification to Europa League first qualifying round
6	Banga	28	7	6	15	25	49	−24	27	
7	LKKA ir Teledema	28	4	3	21	19	63	−44	15	
8	Kruoja	28	2	7	19	24	70	−46	13	

Source: futbolas.lt (in Lithuanian)
Rules for classification: 1) points; 2) head-to-head points; 3) head-to-head goal difference; 4) head-to-head goals scored; 5) goal difference; 6) number of goals scored.
(C) Champions

== Results ==
Every team will play each other four times, twice at home and twice on the road, for a total of 28 games.

First half of season
Home \ Away	BAN	EKR	KRU	L&T	SŪD	ŠIA	TAU	VĖT
Banga		1–2	3–0	1–0	0–0	3–2	1–1	0–5
Ekranas	1–0		4–0	3–0	2–2	2–0	2–1	2–3
Kruoja	2–0	2–2		1–1	0–1	0–5	2–2	0–3
LKKA ir Teledema	0–2	1–1	3–2		2–7	0–2	0–3	0–2
Sūduva	4–0	1–1	6–0	2–0		1–0	3–0	1–1
Šiauliai	4–0	0–1	2–1	0–1	0–1		1–0	2–1
Tauras	0–0	0–1	2–0	1–0	0–2	1–0		1–1
Vėtra	2–2	0–0	6–1	3–1	0–0	2–1	1–0	

Source: futbolas.lt (in Lithuanian)
Legend: Blue = home team win; Yellow = draw; Red = away team win.

Second half of season
Home \ Away	BAN	EKR	KRU	L&T	SŪD	ŠIA	TAU	VĖT
Banga		0–3	4–2	0–1	1–1	1–2	0–2	0–1
Ekranas	5–1		3–0	3–0	4–2	2–0	1–0	1–1
Kruoja	1–2	2–2		2–1	0–1	1–3	0–3	2–2
LKKA ir Teledema	1–2	0–3	2–1		0–4	1–4	0–1	0–1
Sūduva	1–1	1–1	3–1	4–2		5–1	0–0	1–1
Šiauliai	3–0	0–3	0–0	1–1	1–1		2–0	1–0
Tauras	1–0	1–1	1–1	3–0	1–0	0–1		0–0
Vėtra	2–0	1–2	3–0	4–1	2–0	5–2	2–1	

Source: futbolas.lt (in Lithuanian)
Legend: Blue = home team win; Yellow = draw; Red = away team win.

== Top goalscorers ==
Last updated: 26 October 2009; Source: futbolas.lt (in Lithuanian)

Pos.	Player	Club	Goals
1	(Lithuania) Valdas Trakys	Ekranas	20
2	(Lithuania) Tadas Kijanskas	Vėtra	11
2	(Lithuania) Mantas Kuklys	Šiauliai	11
2	(Lithuania) Ričardas Beniušis	Sūduva	11
5	(Lithuania) Egidijus Varnas	Ekranas	10
6	(Lithuania) Povilas Lukšys	Sūduva	9
6	(Lithuania) Mindaugas Grigalevičius	Vėtra	9
8	(Nigeria) Israel Awenayeri Douglas	Banga	8
8	(Lithuania) Igoris Morinas	Kruoja	8
8	(Lithuania) Andrius Urbšys	Sūduva	8
