= FK Nevėžis =

Lithuanian football club

- Full name: Futbolo Klubas Nevėžis
- Founded: 1962; 64 years ago
- Ground: Kėdainiai Stadium; Kėdainiai, Lithuania
- Capacity: 3,000
- Chairman: Saulius Skibiniauskas
- Manager: Vitalijus Stankevičius
- League: 1 Lyga
- 2025: 1 Lyga, 15th
- Website: https://www.fknevezis.lt/site_base/index.php?option=com_frontpage&Itemid=1
Home colours	Away colours

FK Nevėžis is a professional football club from the city of Kėdainiai, Lithuania.

== Achievements ==
- Three times Lithuanian champion (1966, 1972, 1973).
- Twice runner-up (1968, 1969).
- Three times won Bronze medals (1967, 1970, 1979).

The club was selected by the Lithuanian Football Federation to represent Lithuania in the 2015, 2017, and 2019 editions of the UEFA Regions' Cup. Their best placement was 3rd in a group in the Intermediate Round in 2019.

Old Logo from 2008

== Participation in Lithuanian Championships ==
Season	Tier	League	Position	References	Notes
2000	1.	A lyga	6.		
2001	1.	A lyga	7.		
2002	1.	A lyga	9.		▼ Relegation
2003	2.	I lyga	13.		
2004	2.	I lyga	3.		▲ Promotion
2005	1.	A lyga	10.		
2006	1.	A lyga	10.		▼ Relegation
2007	2.	I lyga	3.		
2008	2.	I lyga	9.		
2009	2.	I lyga	4.		
2010	2.	I lyga	3.		
2011	2.	I lyga	2.		
2012	2.	I lyga	2.		
2013	2.	I lyga	2.		
2014	2.	I lyga	8.		
2015	2.	I lyga	6.		
2016	2.	I lyga	4.		
2017	2.	I lyga	7.		
2018	2.	I lyga	4.		
2019	2.	I lyga	5.		
2020	2.	I lyga	1.		▲ Promotion
2021	1.	A lyga	10.		
2022	2.	I lyga	3.		
2023	2.	I lyga	3.		
2024	2.	Pirma lyga	6.		
2025	2.	Pirma lyga	15.		

== Current squad ==
Note: Flags indicate national team as defined under FIFA eligibility rules; some limited exceptions apply. Players may hold more than one non-FIFA nationality.

No.	Pos.	Nation	Player
1	GK	LTU	Audrius Likša
3	DF	LTU	Karolis Gvildys
4	DF	ANG	Bruno Pedro
6	DF	NGR	Nurudeen Abiola Biliaminu
7	MF	LTU	Jonas Supronas
8	MF	JPN	Yuta Suzuki
9	MF	GEO	Nika Toklikishvili
10	MF	JPN	Genta Washizaki
11	FW	UKR	Yevheniy Mohil
12	MF	LTU	Ąžuolas Smagurauskas
13	FW	LTU	Lukas Berednikovas
17	MF	LTU	Vakaris Skibiniauskas

No.	Pos.	Nation	Player
18	DF	JPN	Soichiro Suzuki
22	MF	LTU	Arminas Lukoševičius
24	DF	LTU	Augustas Aksinavičius
30	MF	LTU	Mantas Monkelis
34	GK	LTU	Robertas Granauskas
35	MF	LTU	Rokas Župerka
44	DF	LTU	Myroslav Tsebenko
99	DF	LTU	Karolis Rukuiža
—	GK	LTU	Povilas Survila
—	MF	CMR	Wilfried Teikeu

== Managers ==
- (Lithuania) Vitalijus Stankevčius (December 2017 – May 2021)
- (Lithuania) Darius Gvildys (since May 2021)
- (Lithuania) Algirdas Surgautas (since August 2024 – April 2025
- (Latvia) Dmitrijs Kalašnikovs, June 2025 – October 2025
- (Lithuania) Vitalijus Stankevičius (October 2025 – present)

== See also ==
- 2017 FK Nevėžis season
