= 2013–14 Lithuanian Football Cup =

Tournament details
- Country: Lithuania
- Teams: 48

Final positions
- Champions: Žalgiris
- Runners-up: Banga

The 2013–14 Lithuanian Football Cup is the twenty-fifth season of the Lithuanian annual football knock-out tournament. The competition started on 4 June 2013 with the matches of the first round and is scheduled to end in May 2014. Žalgiris are the defending champions.

The winners will qualify for the first qualifying round of the 2014–15 UEFA Europa League.

== First round ==
The matches started on 4 June 2013 and ended on 6 July 2013.

Team 1	Score	Team 2
4 June
Medelyno Bėgiai (4)	2–0	SFK Rotalis (3)
8 June
Adiada (4)	0–5	Gariūnai (3)
13 June
Pietų IV (5)	0–7	Šilas (2)
14 June
Savanoris (4)	w/o	Centras (4)
15 June
Geležinis Vilkas (5)	0–3	Kuršiai (4)
21 June
Saulininkas (4)	5–0	Prelegentai (4)
23 June
Sarema (4)	5–10	Kupsc (4)
25 June
Rytas (5)	2–2 (4–2p)	Narjanta (4)
26 June
Venta (3)	1–7	Klaipėdos Granitas (2)
27 June
Sakuona-Klarksonas (4)	1–4 (a.e.t.)	Baltija (2)
28 June
Katastrofa (5)	1–4	Aksa-United (4)
29 June
Minija (4)	2–10	TAIP (4)
30 June
Pipirini (4)	2–6	Švyturys (4)
Trivartis (5)	2–6	Spyris (2)
5 July
MRU (3)	w/o	Žygis (3)
6 July
Jambo (4)	1–5	F.B.K. Kaunas (3)

== Second round ==
The matches started on 8 August 2013 and ended on 31 August 2013.

Team 1	Score	Team 2
8 August
Gariūnai (3)	0–1	Klaipėdos Granitas (2)
15 August
Kuršiai (4)	2–2 (5–6p)	Švyturys (4)
19 August
MRU (3)	4–1	Šilas (2)
20 August
F.B.K. Kaunas (3)	1–4	Spyris (2)
30 August
Rytas (5)	0–10	Kupsc (4)
TAIP (4)	4–0	Baltija (2)
Medelyno Bėgiai (4)	1–3	Saulininkas (4)
31 August
Aksa-United (4)	0–0 (0–2p)	Savanoris (4)

== Third round ==
The matches started on 24 September 2013 and ended on 25 September 2013.

Team 1	Score	Team 2
24 September
Kupsc (4)	0–5	Palanga (2)
TAIP (4)	3–0	Spyris (2)
Švyturys (4)	1–5	MRU (3)
25 September
Klaipėdos Granitas (2)	3–0	Šilutė (2)
Nevėžis (2)	6–0	Lietava (2)
Lokomotyvas (2)	0–3	Trakai (2)
Savanoris (4)	2–4	Polonija (2)
Saulininkas (4)	1–4	Tauras (1)

== Fourth round ==
The matches started on 1, 2 & 16 October 2013.

Team 1	Score	Team 2
1 October
Trakai (2)	1–1 (4–2p)	Sūduva (1)
2 October
Palanga (2)	1–4	Kruoja (1)
Tauras (1)	0–2	Banga (1)
Šiauliai (1)	1–0	Ekranas (1)
TAIP (4)	1–2	Klaipėdos Granitas (2)
Atlantas (1)	1–2	Žalgiris (1)
MRU (3)	4–3 (a.e.t.)	Polonija (2)
16 October
Nevėžis (2)	4–5	Dainava (1)

== Quarter-final ==
This round of the competition is to be played over two-legs. The eight winners from the previous round compete at this stage.

Team 1	Agg.	Team 2	1st leg	2nd leg
Šiauliai (1)	1–1	Klaipėdos Granitas (2)	1–1	0–0
Dainava (1)	2–5	Banga (1)	2–1	0–4
Trakai (2)	6–2	MRU (3)	3–0	3–2
Žalgiris (1)	4–2	Kruoja (1)	2–1	2–1

=== First legs ===
22 October 2013	Dainava	2–1	Banga	Alytus Stadium, Alytus
19:00	Bartkevičius 50' (pen.); Strauka 83'		Ivanauskas 19'	Attendance: 100; Referee: Sergejus Slyva

23 October 2013	Trakai	3–0	MRU	Trakų naujasis stadionas, Trakai
15:00	Moroz 29' (pen.); Lemezis 50'; Misiuk 86'			Attendance: 70; Referee: Robertas Valikonis

23 October 2013	Šiauliai	1–1	Klaipėdos Granitas	Savivaldybė Stadium, Šiauliai
18:00	Medžiaušis 70'		Mastianica 35'	Attendance: 250; Referee: Nerijus Dunauskas

23 October 2013	Žalgiris	2–1	Kruoja	LFF Stadium, Vilnius
19:00	Janušauskas 42'; Kuklys 66'		Pocevičius 64'	Attendance: 400; Referee: Darius Petraška

=== Second legs ===
6 November 2013	Kruoja	1–2 (2–4 agg.)	Žalgiris	Pakruojis city stadium, Pakruojis
13:00	Vėževičius 60'		Biliński 90'; Komolov 90+2'	Attendance: 150; Referee: Sergejus Slyva

6 November 2013	Klaipėdos Granitas	0–0 (1–1 agg.)	Šiauliai	Central stadium of Klaipėda, Klaipėda
18:00				Attendance: 400; Referee: Nerijus Dunauskas

6 November 2013	Banga	4–0 (5–2 agg.)	Dainava	Gargždai Stadium, Gargždai
18:30	Duda 22'; Staponka 35'; Salamanavičius 79'; Gudauskas 90+1'			Attendance: 500; Referee: Audrius Žuta

6 November 2013	MRU	2–3 (2–6 agg.)	Trakai	Trakų naujasis stadionas, Trakai
20:00	Pusvaškis 48'; Švaikevičius 80'		Romeiko 14'; Moroz 38' (pen.), 90+3'	Attendance: 200; Referee: Jurijus Paškovskis

== Semi-final ==
This round of the competition is to be played over two-legs. The four winners from the previous round compete at this stage.

Team 1	Agg.	Team 2	1st leg	2nd leg
Trakai (2)	0 – 1	Žalgiris (1)	0–1	0–0
Banga (1)	3–1	Klaipėdos Granitas (2)	2–0	1–1

=== First legs ===
8 April 2014	Trakai	0–1	Žalgiris	Trakų naujasis stadionas, Trakai
19:00			Nyuiadzi 74'	Attendance: 2500; Referee: Gediminas Mažeika

9 April 2014	Banga	2–0	Klaipėdos Granitas	Gargždai Stadium, Gargždai
19:00	Arlauskis 26'; Shevchuk 40'			Attendance: 1100; Referee: Sergejus Slyva

=== Second legs ===
29 April 2014	Žalgiris	0–0 (1–0 agg.)	Trakai	LFF Stadium, Vilnius
				Attendance: 3000; Referee: Nerijus Dunauskas

30 April 2014	Klaipėdos Granitas	1–1 (1–3 agg.)	Banga	Central stadium of Klaipėda, Klaipėda
	Artyom Stezhka 90+2' (o.g.)		34' Urbaitis	Attendance: 1000; Referee: Gediminas Mažeika

== Final ==
17 May 2014

Žalgiris	2–1	Banga
Wilk 13'; Pilibaitis 38'		Grigaitis 57'

Utenio stadionas, Utena
Attendance: 4,000
Referee: Sergejus Slyva
