= 2015 LFF I Lyga =

I Lyga
- Season: 2015
- Champions: Lietava
- Top goalscorer: Laurynas Stonkus
- Biggest home win: Žalgiris B 12–0 Tauras
- Biggest away win: Tauras 2–8 Šilutė
- Highest scoring: Žalgiris B 12–0 Tauras

2015 LFF I Lyga was a Lithuanian second-tier football league season which started on March 28, 2015 and finished on October 31. It consisted of 18 teams.

== Clubs (2015) ==
Locations of the 2015 I Lyga teams

Team	Home city	Home ground
Lietava	Jonava	Jonava City stadium
Žalgiris B	Vilnius	LFF Stadium
Palanga	Palanga	Palanga City stadium
Banga	Gargždai	Gargždai City stadium
Trakai-2	Trakai	Trakai City stadium
Šilas	Kazlų Rūda	FK "Šilas" stadium
Panevėžys	Panevėžys	Aukštaitija Stadium
Nevėžis	Kėdainiai	Kėdainiai City stadium
Šilutė	Šilutė	Šilutė City stadium
FBK Kaunas	Kaunas	Darius and Girėnas Stadium
Lokomotyvas	Radviliškis	Radviliškis City stadium
Džiugas	Telšiai	Telšiai City stadium
Kražantė	Kelmė	Kelmė City stadium
Auska	Alytus	Alytus City stadium
Minija	Kretinga	Kretinga City stadium
MRU	Vilnius	LFF Stadium
Tauras	Tauragė	Tauragė City stadium
Kruoja-2	Pakruojis	Pakruojis City stadium

== 2015 I Lyga Table ==
Pos	Team	Pld	W	D	L	GF	GA	GD	Pts	Qualification or relegation
1	Lietava (C, P)	34	25	5	4	103	24	+79	80	Promotion to A Lyga
2	Žalgiris-B	34	24	4	6	112	37	+75	76	
3	Banga	34	24	5	5	77	28	+49	77	
4	Šilas	34	22	4	8	82	45	+37	70	
5	Palanga	34	19	7	8	84	38	+46	64	
6	Nevėžis	34	20	3	11	77	59	+18	63	
7	Trakai-2	34	19	3	12	81	52	+29	60	
8	Panevėžys	34	18	7	9	79	48	+31	55	
9	Šilutė	34	14	5	15	59	52	+7	47	
10	FC Džiugas	34	12	5	17	43	51	−8	41	
11	Lokomotyvas	34	12	3	19	52	72	−20	39	
12	F.B.K. Kaunas	34	10	7	17	49	64	−15	37	
13	Kražantė	34	10	5	19	52	101	−49	35	
14	MRU	34	9	7	18	46	65	−19	34	
15	Auska	34	10	6	18	41	66	−25	33	
16	Minija	34	6	7	21	46	74	−28	25	
17	Tauras	34	7	1	26	41	150	−109	22	
18	Kruoja-2 (D)	34	3	0	31	17	114	−97	9	Withdrawn (Note: On 25 August 2015, Kruoja Pakruojis withdrew from the 2015 A Lyga after repeated accusations of match-fixing and breach of fairplay regulations. Since more than half of the matches had been played at the time of the withdrawal, the results from played matches are maintained and matches scheduled to take place after the withdrawal will be decided as 3–0 losses.)

Updated to match(es) played on 25 October 2015. Source: PirmaLyga Soccerway
Rules for classification: 1) Points; 2) Play-off (only if deciding champion); 3) Head-to-head points; 4) Head-to-head goal difference; 5) Goal difference; 6) Goals scored; 7) Matches won; 8) Highest placed Reserves-team in the Reserve league.
(C) Champions; (D) Disqualified; (P) Promoted

== See also ==
- 2015 A Lyga
