= 2016 LFF I Lyga =

I Lyga
- Season: 2016
- Champions: Šilas
- Matches: 240
- Goals: 947 (3.95 per match)
- Top goalscorer: Artur Skuratovič (31 goals)
- Biggest home win: Vytis 14-0 Minija (15 October 2016)
- Biggest away win: Šilutė 0-8 Nevėžis (23 June 2016); F.B.K. Kaunas 0-8 Hegelmann Litauen (5 October 2016)
- Highest scoring: Vytis 14-0 Minija (15 October 2016)
- Longest winning run: Šilas; Nevėžis (7 games)
- Longest unbeaten run: Palanga (18 games)
- Longest winless run: Lokomotyvas; F.B.K. Kaunas (17 games)
- Longest losing run: F.B.K. Kaunas (14 games)
- Highest attendance: 1,000; Banga v DFK Dainava (25 March 2016)
- Lowest attendance: 20; F.B.K. Kaunas v Hegelmann Litauen (5 October 2016)
- Total attendance: 48,548
- Average attendance: 204

2016 LFF I Lyga is a Lithuanian second-tier football league season which started on 25 March 2016 and will finish on 6 November 2016. It consists of 16 teams.

== Teams ==
Locations of the 2016 LFF I Lyga teams

=== Stadiums, personnel and sponsorship ===
Team	Head coach	Captain	Kitmaker	Sponsor	Stadium	Capacity
Banga	(Lithuania) Vaidas Žutautas	(Lithuania) Aurelijus Staponka	Nike	Litana, Neogroup	Gargždai Stadium, Gargždai	2,323
DFK Dainava	(Lithuania) Darius Gvildys	(Lithuania) Linas Savastas	Legea	TonyBet	Alytus Stadium, Alytus	3,748
Džiugas	(Lithuania) Deivis Kančelskis	(Lithuania) Andrius Lipskis	Joma	TonyBet	Telšiai Central Stadium, Telšiai	2,400
Hegelmann Litauen	(Lithuania) Dainius Bučma	(Lithuania) Marius Miškinis	Joma	BC Žalgiris	Darius and Girėnas Stadium, Kaunas	9,180
F.B.K. Kaunas	(Lithuania) Mantas Babianskas	(Lithuania) Kristijonas Gedgaudas	Rind	—	Darius and Girėnas Stadium, Kaunas	9,180
Kražantė	(Lithuania) Rytis Tavoras	(Lithuania) Deividas Lunskis	Hummel	—	Kelmė stadium, Kelmė	300
Lokomotyvas	(Lithuania) Marijus Rimas	(Lithuania) Justas Gulbinas	Joma	—	Radviliškis central stadium, Radviliškis	800
Minija	(Lithuania) Gediminas Petrauskas	(Lithuania) Audrius Tolis	Joma	—	Kretinga stadium, Kretinga	900
Nevėžis	(Lithuania) Vitalijus Stankevičius	(Lithuania) Nerijus Kestenis	Hummel	Daumantų	Kėdainiai Stadium, Kėdainiai	3,000
Palanga	(Lithuania) Valdas Trakys	(Lithuania) Gvidas Juška	Jako	Gabija****	Palanga Stadium, Palanga	1,212
Panevėžys	(Lithuania) Virginijus Liubšys	(Lithuania) Mantas Savėnas	Adidas	Kalnapilis	Aukštaitija Stadium, Panevėžys	4,000
Šilas	(Lithuania) Gediminas Jarmalavičius	(Lithuania) Andrius Urbšys	Adidas	Frameda, Rasa Active Life	Kazlų Rūda stadium, Kazlų Rūda	700
Šilutė	(Lithuania) Svajūnas Česnulis	(Lithuania) Donatas Surblys	Hummel	—	Šilutė Stadium, Šilutė	3,000
Trakai B	(Lithuania) Marius Bezykornovas		Nike	Ecoil	Trakai Stadium, Trakai	200
Vytis	(Lithuania) Algimantas Liubinskas	(Lithuania) Tadas Gražiūnas	Adidas	Forgiven	LFF Stadium, Vilnius	5,067
Žalgiris B	(Lithuania) Andrius Skerla	(Lithuania) Martin Moroz	Nike	TOP Sport	LFF Stadium, Vilnius	5,067

== League table ==
Pos	Team	Pld	W	D	L	GF	GA	GD	Pts	
1	Šilas (Note: Šilas, who won the league and received promotion to the 2017 A Lyga, decided to refuse and relegate themselves after being accused of match-fixing. As there were none involvement of the club detected, they will compete in the 2017 II Lyga South zone.) (C, R)	30	23	3	4	95	25	+70	72	Originally promoted, but relegated to II Lyga, see note for more.
2	Palanga	30	21	7	2	96	29	+67	70	Qualification to Promotion play-offs
3	Vytis	30	19	3	8	102	34	+68	60	
4	Nevėžis	30	17	9	4	76	38	+38	60	
5	Panevėžys	30	17	8	5	68	35	+33	59	
6	Banga	30	15	7	8	62	31	+31	52	
7	Džiugas	30	15	3	12	51	44	+7	48	
8	Žalgiris B (I)	30	14	3	13	62	61	+1	45	Ineligible for promotion
9	DFK Dainava	30	13	4	13	57	46	+11	43	
10	Hegelmann Litauen (Note: Hegelmann Litauen finished in 11th place, but they were considered as Kauno Žalgiris reserve squad in the 2016 season and were forced to move down as their parent club finished last in the 2016 A Lyga. Despite their decision to become fully independent after the season and Kauno Žalgiris remaining in the first tier after Šilas match-fixing scandal, they will compete in the 2017 II Lyga South zone.) (R, D)	30	13	3	14	55	56	−1	42	Relegation to II Lyga despite being in a non relegation spot, see note for more.
11	Trakai B (I)	30	9	3	18	44	59	−15	30	Ineligible for promotion
12	Šilutė	30	8	6	16	38	60	−22	30	
13	Kražantė (Note: Despite Kražantė finishing in the 13th place club failed to receive I Lyga's license and had to be relegated into the lower tier. They decided not to seek II Lyga license and will play in the 2017 III Lyga Šiauliai County championship instead.) (D, R)	30	8	4	18	47	86	−39	28	Relegation to II Lyga originally, but later did not compete, see notes for more.
14	Lokomotyvas (Note: Lokomotyvas finished 14th and should have been relegated, but received a chance to remain in the league as Hegelmann Litauen took the last relegation place due to regulations preventing senior and reserve teams competing in the same division. Despite that club decided not to seek I Lyga's license and because of that still had to be relegated into the lower tier. Lokomotyvas failed to receive II Lyga's license and decided to stop competing in the outdoor competitions, remaining participants of the futsal A Lyga.) (D, R)	30	6	5	19	42	86	−44	23	Relegation to II Lyga originally, but later did not compete, see notes for more.
15	F.B.K. Kaunas (R)	30	4	1	25	25	134	−109	13	Relegation to II Lyga
16	Minija (R)	30	3	1	26	27	123	−96	10	Relegation to II Lyga

Source: Pirma Lyga
Rules for classification: 1) Points; 2) Play-off (only if deciding champion); 3) Head-to-head points; 4) Head-to-head goal difference; 5) Goal difference; 6) Goals scored; 7) Matches won;
(C) Champions; (D) Disqualified; (I) Ineligible for promotion; (R) Relegated

== Attendance ==
Average home attendance
Team	GP	Total	High	Low	Average
Banga	14	7,424	1,000	250	531
Panevėžys	15	6,261	820	101	418
DFK Dainava	15	5,753	700	100	384
Šilas	15	5,027	750	60	336
Džiugas	15	4,570	700	200	305
Vytis	15	3,165	430	30	211
Nevėžis	15	2,953	473	60	197
Palanga	15	2,619	300	54	175
Minija	15	2,073	250	30	139
Kražantė	15	1,587	200	30	106
Žalgiris B	15	1,554	200	45	104
Hegelmann Litauen	15	1,409	200	30	94
Šilutė	15	1,350	200	30	90
F.B.K. Kaunas	15	1,025	193	20	69
Lokomotyvas	14	893	120	30	64
Trakai B	15	885	100	30	59
Total	238	48,548	318	116	204

Highest attendance
Rank	Round	Home team	Score	Away team	Attendance	Date	Stadium
1	1	Banga	1–1	DFK Dainava	1,000	25 March 2016	Gargždai Stadium
2	10	Panevėžys	0–1	Žalgiris B	820	27 May 2016	Aukštaitija Stadium
3	7	Banga	2–0	Palanga	814	6 May 2016	Gargždai Stadium
4	4	Banga	7–0	Minija	800	15 April 2016	Gargždai Stadium
5	30	Šilas	2–1	Banga	750	23 October 2016	Kazlų Rūda stadium
