= Žemaitijos Taurė =

- Organiser(s): Telšiai County Football Federation
- Founded: 2015; 11 years ago
- Region: Samogitia
- Teams: 8–10
- Current champions: Pakruojis (1st title)
- Most championships: Šilutė; Banga; Džiugas; Pakruojis (1 title)
- Broadcaster: Futbolo.TV
- Website: TAFF.lt

The Žemaitijos Taurė (transl. Samogitian Cup) is an annual pre-season football tournament between teams from Samogitia. It is organized by the Telšiai County Football Federation and takes place in early March at the Telšiai Artificial Football Pitch in Telšiai, Lithuania.

== History ==
The origins of the tournament seeks Samogitian Championship, which was started in the mid-1930s, with Džiugas winning the first three tournaments of 1935, 1936, 1937. The first modern Samogitia Cup was organised by Telšiai County Football Federation in 2015 to mark the 80 years from the birth of original tournament. It's hosted by Džiugas and held on 8–21 March as simple round-robin tournament. Šilutė won the inaugural tournament after defeating Džiugas 2–1 in the last round.

The format for later editions was changed a little bit as additional games for 1st, 3rd and 5th places were added after the group competitions. The amount of participating teams has also been expanded from 8 to 10 participants. Banga won the second edition of the cup. Hosts Džiugas finally became champions in 2017 tournament. Pakruojis occurred as the fourth different winner in 2018 beating hosts Džiugas by a goal difference in the overall table as rules of the tournament were reverted to the first year format due to a decline in participating teams number.

The competition was discontinued in 2019, though a U-17 tournament was organized instead.

== Winners ==
Year	Winners	Runners-up	Third place	Top Scorer	Ref
2015	Šilutė	Džiugas	Kražantė	(Canada) Cazz Warren (Džiugas)	
2016	Banga	Palanga	Džiugas	(Lithuania) Algimantas Bačanskis (Banga)	
2017	Džiugas	Pakruojis	Palanga	(Belarus) Maksim Lukashevich (Palanga)	
2018	Pakruojis	Džiugas	Minija	(Lithuania) Donatas Strockis (Pakruojis)	

== Performance by team ==
Žemaitijos Taurė hosts Džiugas are the only team that have participated in all four tournaments. Together with Palanga and Minija, they make the only three clubs that have finished as medalists throughout every appearance in the competitions.

Team	Winners	Runners-up	Third place
(Lithuania) Džiugas	1 (2017)	2 (2015, 2018)	1 (2016)
(Lithuania) Pakruojis	1 (2018)	1 (2017)	–
(Lithuania) Šilutė	1 (2015)	–	–
(Lithuania) Banga	1 (2016)	–	–
(Lithuania) Palanga	–	1 (2016)	1 (2017)
(Lithuania) Kražantė	–	–	1 (2015)
(Lithuania) Minija	–	–	1 (2018)
