= Povilas Valinčius =

Lithuanian footballer

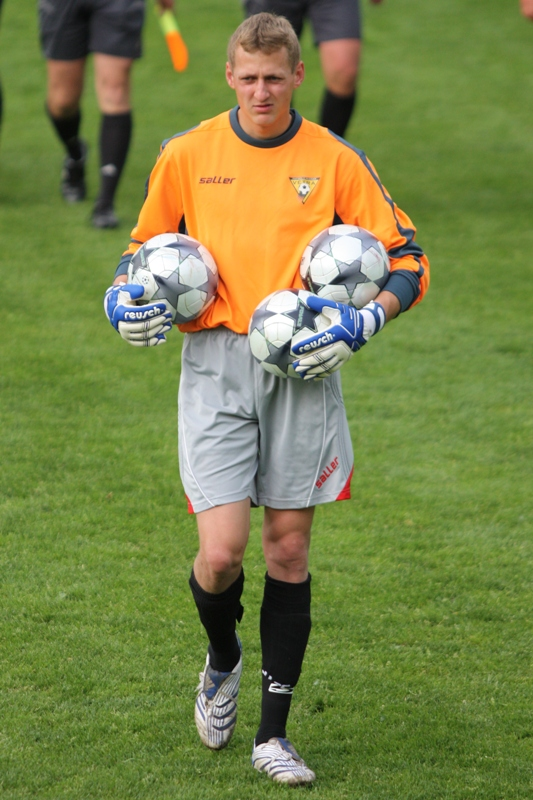
- Valinčius in 2009

Personal information
- Date of birth: 16 May 1989 (age 37)
- Place of birth: Marijampolė, Lithuanian SSR
- Height: 1.90 m (6 ft 3 in)
- Position: Goalkeeper

Youth career
- 2006–2009: Vėtra

Senior career*
Years	Team	Apps	(Gls)
2009–2010	Vėtra	10	(0)
2010–2012	Sūduva Marijampolė	41	(0)
2012–2014	Petrolul Ploiești	4	(0)
2014–2015	MRU Vilnius	?	(?)
2015–2016	Šiauliai	32	(0)
2016–2017	Atlantas	26	(0)
2017	Šilas	0	(0)
2017–2018	Jonava	10	(0)

International career^{‡}
2009–2010	Lithuania U-21	2	(0)
- * Club domestic league appearances and goals as of 25 October 2017 ‡ National team caps and goals as of 20 June 2010

Povilas Valinčius (born 16 May 1989 in Marijampolė) is a Lithuanian footballer who most recently played as a goalkeeper for Lithuanian A Lyga club Jonava.

== Career ==
After departure from Petrolul Ploiești, Valinčius joined MRU Vilnius until the end of the season. He signed with A Lyga side Šiauliai in 2015 and helped them to avoid direct relegation from the league.

Afterwards goalkeeper signed a one-year deal with Atlantas.

On 11 January 2017, Povilas Valinčius joined I Lyga champions Šilas, but he didn't debuted in an official competition as team decided to retire to II Lyga and release all high-earning players after match-fixing scandal in friendlies.

Valinčius joined another A Lyga side Jonava on 12 May 2017.
