= FC Pakruojis =

Lithuanian football club

Pakruojis
- Full name: Futbolo centras "Pakruojis"
- Founded: January 2016; 9 years ago
- Dissolved: 2019; 6 years ago
- Ground: Pakruojis Stadium
- Capacity: 2,000
- Coordinates: 55°58′57.0″N 23°51′53.5″E
- Chairman: Rimantas Čeponis
- Manager: Aidas Dambrauskas
- League: defunct
- 2019: ▼15th (I Lyga) (relegation)
- Website: https://www.facebook.com/fcpakruojis/
Home colours	Away colours

Futbolo centras Pakruojis, commonly known as Pakruojis, was a Lithuanian football club located in Pakruojis, center of Pakruojis District.

== History ==
Club was created in January 2016 after the dissolution of another Pakruojis-based club, Kruoja. Despite publicly denying any links with Kruoja, club attracted many of their footballers and also former Kruoja head coach Aidas Dambrauskas. They played in 2016 Žemaitijos Taurė, but remained last in A Lyga. Team was hoping to compete in the 2016 LFF I Lyga, but failed to obtain I Lyga license and played in II Lyga West zone instead. They won the competition by 13 points margin and secured promotion to I Lyga.

Before the start of the 2017 season the club once again competed in the Žemaitijos Taurė, where this time they finished second, losing to hosts Džiugas 3–0 in the final. Club started their league campaign really well and even managed to climb to the top of the league after 14 rounds, but soon after had a winless streak of 6 games and didn't recover, finally ending the season in 9th place.

In the 2018 LFF I Lyga season, after the first half of the championship, the team was in second position, but after parting with several players in the transfer window lost match after match and eventually finished in seventh position.

In 2019 LFF I Lyga season, FC Pakruojis struggled, and after 19 game losing streak finished last in the league, and were relegated. They have conceded 63 goals in their last 6 games.

In 2020, they defunct and not played in any competitions.

== Stadium ==
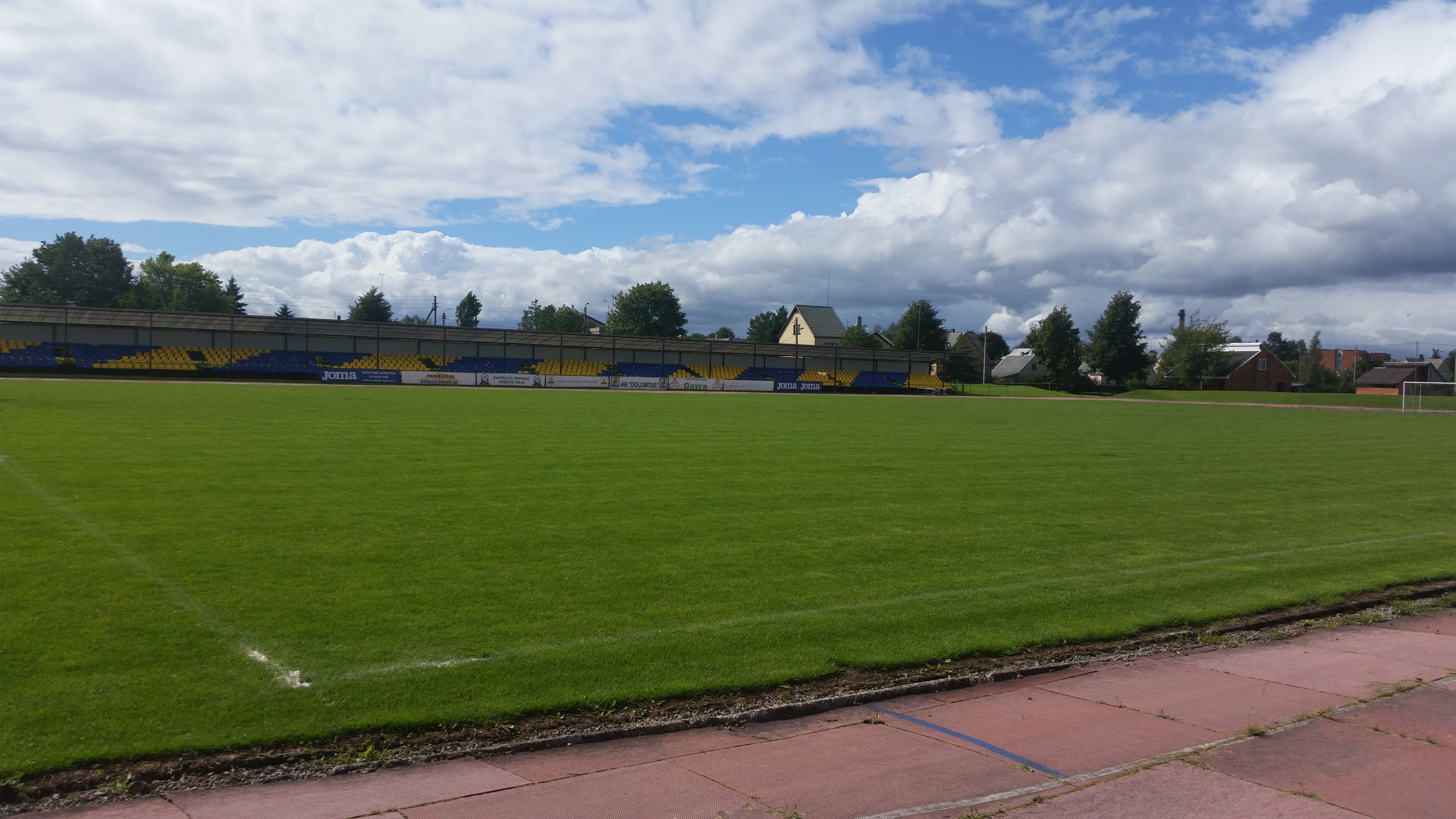
Stadium of FC Pakruojis.

Club play their home matches in Pakruojis Stadium. The current capacity of the stadium is 2,000 seats.

== Honours ==
The club's honours:

- II Lyga West Zone
  - Winners: 2016

== Recent seasons ==
The recent season-by-season performance of the club:

Season	Division	Tier	Position	Cup
2016	II Lyga West zone	III	1st ↑	Second round (56 teams)
2017	LFF I Lyga	II	9	First round (44 teams)
2018	LFF I Lyga	II	7	1/16 final
2019	LFF I Lyga	II	15 ↓	1/16 final

↑ Promoted	↓ Relegated
