= 2014 A Lyga =

A Lyga
- Season: 2014
- Champions: Žalgiris
- Relegated: Dainava
- Champions League: Žalgiris
- Europa League: Kruoja
- Matches: 180
- Goals: 559 (3.11 per match)
- Top goalscorer: Niko Tokić (19)
- Biggest home win: Atlantas 12-0 Dainava
- Biggest away win: Dainava 0-8 Žalgiris; Dainava 0-8 Sūduva
- Highest scoring: Atlantas 12-0 Dainava

The 2014 A Lyga, also known as SMSCredit.lt A Lyga for sponsoring purposes, is the 25th season of the A Lyga, the top-tier association football league of Lithuania. The season starts on 8 March 2014 and ends on 29 November 2014. VMFD Žalgiris Vilnius are the defending champions.

== Changes from 2013 ==
The league changed its number of teams for the fifth time in a row, increasing it from nine teams in 2013 A Lyga to ten sides, because it 2 new clubs from I Lyga, it is FK Trakai and FK Klaipėdos Granitas. As a consequence, the schedule increased from 32 to 36 matches per team, with each team playing every other team four times in total, twice at home and twice away.

=== Stadiums and locations ===
Location of teams in the 2014 A Lyga

Club	Location	Stadium	Capacity	2013 season
FK Atlantas	Klaipėda	Central stadium of Klaipėda	4940	2nd
FK Banga Gargždai	Gargždai	Gargždai Stadium	2000	6th
FK Dainava Alytus	Alytus	Alytus Stadium	3748	8th
FK Ekranas	Panevėžys	Aukštaitija Stadium	4000	3rd
FK Klaipėdos Granitas	Klaipėda	Central stadium of Klaipėda	4940	I Lyga, 1st
FK Kruoja Pakruojis	Pakruojis	Pakruojis Stadium	2000	5th
FK Sūduva Marijampolė	Marijampolė	ARVI Football Arena	6250	4th
FK Šiauliai	Šiauliai	Savivaldybė Stadium	4000	7th
FK Trakai	Trakai	LFF Stadium	5500	I Lyga, 3rd
VMFD Žalgiris Vilnius	Vilnius	LFF Stadium	5500	1st

== League table ==
Pos	Team	Pld	W	D	L	GF	GA	GD	Pts	Qualification or relegation
1	Žalgiris (C)	36	25	9	2	92	17	+75	84	Qualification to Champions League second qualifying round
2	Kruoja	36	19	9	8	67	34	+33	66	Qualification to Europa League first qualifying round (Note: The winners of the 2014–15 Lithuanian Football Cup competition will qualify for the first qualifying round of the 2015–16 UEFA Europa League.)
3	Atlantas	36	19	8	9	76	36	+40	65	Qualification to Europa League first qualifying round
4	Trakai	36	18	9	9	65	38	+27	63	Qualification to Europa League first qualifying round
5	Sūduva	36	17	11	8	70	38	+32	62	
6	Ekranas (R)	36	12	9	15	51	58	−7	45	Relegation to I Lyga
7	Šiauliai	36	12	4	20	50	63	−13	40	
8	Klaipėdos Granitas	36	9	10	17	47	67	−20	37	
9	Banga (R)	36	8	6	22	29	65	−36	30	Relegation to I Lyga
10	Dainava (R)	36	2	3	31	12	143	−131	9	Relegation to I Lyga

Source: soccerway.com
Rules for classification: 1) points; 2) goal difference; 3) number of goals scored.
(C) Champions; (R) Relegated

== Results ==
=== First half of season ===
Home \ Away	ATL	BAN	DAI	EKR	KLG	KRU	SŪD	ŠIA	TRA	ŽAL
Atlantas		0–0	6–0	2–2	2–0	1–3	1–0	1–0	0–2	0–1
Banga	0–2		6–0	0–0	0–0	0–1	0–1	1–2	1–0	1–2
Dainava	0–7	2–0		0–3	0–5	0–5	0–8	0–6	1–7	0–8
Ekranas	2–1	0–0	6–0		1–1	1–2	0–2	3–1	2–2	0–0
Klaipėdos Granitas	2–2	1–0	2–0	1–3		2–2	0–2	3–0	0–0	2–1
Kruoja	1–1	0–1	4–0	2–0	2–2		1–1	1–0	0–1	0–0
Sūduva	1–1	0–1	5–0	2–2	5–1	0–1		2–0	0–1	0–3
Šiauliai	3–1	1–2	5–0	2–0	1–0	1–1	1–4		0–2	0–0
Trakai	0–0	2–2	4–0	2–0	2–0	1–4	3–4	2–1		1–1
Žalgiris	4–0	1–0	9–1	1–0	1–1	2–0	8–1	3–1	1–1	

Source: soccerway.com
Legend: Blue = home team win; Yellow = draw; Red = away team win.

=== Second half of season ===
Home \ Away	ATL	BAN	DAI	EKR	KLG	KRU	SŪD	ŠIA	TRA	ŽAL
Atlantas		3–1	12–0	4–0	3–0	1–0	2–2	4–0	1–0	2–1
Banga	1–2		3–1	0–1	0–6	1–4	1–3	1–3	0–4	1–5
Dainava	0–4	0–0		1–2	0–0	2–0	0–6	0–1	0–2	0–3
Ekranas	0–3	4–1	2–1		2–3	3–2	1–2	2–3	2–1	1–3
Klaipėdos Granitas	0–3	1–2	2–0	2–4		1–5	1–1	0–0	2–3	1–6
Kruoja	4–1	0–1	3–2	1–0	3–1		2–1	4–1	2–2	0–0
Sūduva	0–0	2–0	0–0	0–0	4–1	1–2		2–0	0–0	1–1
Šiauliai	0–3	4–1	4–1	0–0	1–2	1–5	2–4		3–1	1–2
Trakai	3–0	4–0	1–0	5–1	2–1	0–0	1–3	3–1		0–2
Žalgiris	3–0	3–0	2–0	5–1	4–0	1–0	0–0	2–0	3–0	

Source: soccerway.com
Legend: Blue = home team win; Yellow = draw; Red = away team win.

== Top goalscorers ==
Pos.	Player	Club	Goals
1	(Croatia) Niko Tokić	Šiauliai	19
2	(Lithuania) Linas Pilibaitis	Žalgiris	17
3	(Lithuania) Ričardas Beniušis	Kruoja	15
3	(Lithuania) Lukas Kochanauskas	Trakai	15
5	(Brazil) Elivelto	Ekranas	13
5	(Lithuania) Evaldas Razulis	Atlantas	13
5	(Lithuania) Tomas Radzinevičius	Sūduva	13
