= 2015 A Lyga =

A Lyga
- Season: 2015
- Champions: Žalgiris
- Champions League: Žalgiris
- Europa League: Trakai; Atlantas
- Matches: 180
- Goals: 573 (3.18 per match)
- Top goalscorer: Tomas Radzinevičius
- Biggest home win: 6-0 (2 Matches)
- Biggest away win: Kl.Granitas 1-8 Sūduva
- Highest scoring: Kl.Granitas 1-8 Sūduva

The 2015 A Lyga, also known as SMSCredit.lt A Lyga for sponsoring purposes was the 26th season of the A Lyga, the top-tier association football league of Lithuania. The season started in February 2015 and ended in November 2015. Žalgiris Vilnius are the defending champions.

== Teams ==
FK Ekranas and FK Banga failed to obtain a license to play in the A Lyga and were relegated alongside FK Dainava, which finished last in the 2014 A Lyga. They were replaced by FC Stumbras and FK Spyris from Kaunas, giving the city two football teams in the highest league for the first time since 2002, and FK Utenis from Utena. All three teams make their debut at the top level.

=== Stadiums and locations ===
Club	Location	Stadium	Capacity	2014 season
FK Atlantas	Klaipėda	Central stadium of Klaipėda	5,000	3rd
FK Klaipėdos Granitas	Klaipėda	Central stadium of Klaipėda	5,000	8th
FK Kruoja Pakruojis	Pakruojis	Pakruojis Stadium	2,000	2nd
FK Spyris Kaunas	Kaunas	Darius and Girėnas Stadium	9,180	I Lyga, 5th
FK Stumbras	Kaunas	Darius and Girėnas Stadium	9,180	I Lyga, 1st
FK Sūduva Marijampolė	Marijampolė	ARVI Football Arena	6,250	5th
FK Šiauliai	Šiauliai	Savivaldybė Stadium	4,000	7th
FK Trakai	Trakai	LFF Stadium	5,500	4th
FK Utenis Utena	Utena	Utenis Stadium	3,000	I Lyga, 3rd
FK Žalgiris Vilnius	Vilnius	LFF Stadium	5,500	1st

=== Kit manufacturer and sponsors ===
Club	Kit manufacturer	Sponsors
Atlantas	Jako	
Granitas	Errea	Orakulas
Kruoja	Errea	
Spyris	Joma	BC Žalgiris
Stumbras	Hummel	Novecorum Group
Sūduva	Joma	Sumeda
Šiauliai	Patrick	Gubernija
Trakai	Nike	Ecoil
Utenis	Hummel	Utenos Alus
Žalgiris	Kappa	TOP Sport

== League table ==
Pos	Team	Pld	W	D	L	GF	GA	GD	Pts	Qualification or relegation
1	Žalgiris Vilnius (C)	36	31	1	4	104	25	+79	94	Qualification to Champions League second qualifying round (Note: Žalgiris Vilnius qualified for the Europa League first qualifying round by winning the 2015–16 Lithuanian Football Cup. However, since they already qualified for European competition based on their league position, the spot awarded to the cup winners was passed down the league.)
2	Trakai	36	27	3	6	92	33	+59	84	Qualification to Europa League first qualifying round
3	Atlantas	36	21	7	8	65	34	+31	70	Qualification to Europa League first qualifying round
4	Sūduva Marijampolė	36	21	4	11	76	34	+42	67	Qualification to Europa League first qualifying round
5	Spyris Kaunas	36	13	6	17	47	74	−27	45	
6	Utenis Utena	36	11	9	16	41	50	−9	42	
7	Stumbras Kaunas	36	11	8	17	51	74	−23	41	
8	Klaipėdos Granitas (D)	36	6	9	21	37	83	−46	27	Disqualified (Note: On 29 October 2015, Klaipėdos Granitas was disqualified from the 2015 A Lyga after breach of fairplay regulations. Klaipėdos Granitas, made an appeal, but The Appeals Committee upheld the decision. Since more than half of the matches had been played at the time of the withdrawal, the results from played matches were maintained and matches scheduled to take place after the withdrawal were decided as 3–0 losses.)
9	Šiauliai (D, R)	36	5	5	26	37	94	−57	20 (Note: Head-to-head record: Kruoja Pakruojis–Šiauliai 2–2, Šiauliai–Kruoja Pakruojis 1–0, Kruoja Pakruojis–Šiauliai 2–3, Šiauliai–Kruoja Pakruojis 3–0)	Disqualified
10	Kruoja Pakruojis (D, R)	36	4	8	24	23	72	−49	20	Withdrawn and relegation to I Lyga (Note: On 25 August 2015, Kruoja Pakruojis withdrew from the 2015 A Lyga after repeated accusations of match-fixing and breach of fairplay regulations. Since more than half of the matches had been played at the time of the withdrawal, the results from played matches were maintained and matches scheduled to take place after the withdrawal were decided as 3–0 losses.)

Source: UEFA Soccerway
Rules for classification: 1) Points; 2) Play-off (only if deciding champion); 3) Head-to-head points; 4) Head-to-head goal difference; 5) Goal difference; 6) Goals scored; 7) Matches won; 8) Highest placed Reserves-team in the Reserve league.
(C) Champions; (D) Disqualified; (R) Relegated

== Results ==
=== First half of season ===
Home \ Away	ATL	KLG	KRU	SPY	STU	SŪD	ŠIA	TRA	UTE	ŽAL
Atlantas		0–1	3–1	2–0	2–0	0–1	5–0	5–1	1–1	4–2
Klaipėdos Granitas	1–2		0–3	1–1	1–5	1–2	2–2	2–4	2–1	0–2
Kruoja	1–2	1–1		1–2	1–1	1–3	2–2	0–2	1–0	0–2
Spyris	1–0	2–1	0–2		1–4	2–1	2–1	0–3	2–1	0–1
Stumbras	2–2	1–1	2–0	2–4		0–2	3–1	2–3	0–1	0–4
Sūduva	1–1	3–1	3–0	5–1	1–1		6–0	0–1	0–1	1–2
Šiauliai	0–0	0–0	1–0	1–2	1–1	0–3		3–1	0–2	1–6
Trakai	2–0	5–0	1–1	2–0	3–1	4–1	4–0		5–1	2–1
Utenis	1–2	1–3	0–0	2–3	1–1	1–1	1–0	1–0		0–2
Žalgiris	2–0	6–0	3–0 (Note: walkover)	4–0	4–1	2–0	3–2	1–2	2–0	

Legend: Blue = home team win; Yellow = draw; Red = away team win.

=== Second half of season ===
Home \ Away	ATL	KLG	KRU	SPY	STU	SŪD	ŠIA	TRA	UTE	ŽAL
Atlantas		1–1	3–0 (Note: walkover)	2–1	4–1	2–1	4–1	1–0	1–0	0–1
Klaipėdos Granitas	1–5		2–0	2–2	0–3	1–8	4–1	1–4	1–2	1–2
Kruoja	0–3	0–3		0–3	0–3	1–2	2–3	0–3	2–1	2–2
Spyris	1–1	4–1	1–1		1–1	0–1	3–2	1–5	1–1	2–4
Stumbras	0–2	1–1	3–0	1–0		0–4	3–2	0–5	3–1	1–7
Sūduva	3–1	1–0	3–0	5–1	3–0		5–0	0–1	3–0	1–3
Šiauliai	0–2	3–0	3–0	1–2	11–2	0–2		2–4	0–2	1–4
Trakai	5–1	3–0	0–0	5–0	3–1	2–0	4–0		2–1	0–2
Utenis	0–0	0–0	3–0	4–1	3–1	0–0	3–2	1–1		0–3
Žalgiris	0–1	2–0	3–0	3–0	4–0	3–0	5–0	3–0	4–3	

Legend: Blue = home team win; Yellow = draw; Red = away team win.

== Top goalscorers ==
Pos.	Player	Club	Goals
1	(Lithuania) Tomas Radzinevičius	Sūduva	28
2	(Armenia) David Arshakyan	Trakai	25
3	(Russia) Andrey Panyukov	Atlantas	20
4	(Lithuania) Artūras Rimkevičius	Stumbras	20
5	(Lithuania) Darvydas Šernas	Žalgiris	17
6	(Lithuania) Linas Pilibaitis	Žalgiris	16
7	(Lithuania) Andrius Velička	Spyris	12
