= VJSM Kelmė =

Association football team in the III Lyga

Kelmės FK-VJSM
- Full name: Kelmės futbolo klubas ir VJSM
- Nickname: Joker
- Founded: 2006; 19 years ago
- Ground: Kelmė Stadium
- Capacity: 1,000
- Coordinates: 55°37′40″N 22°56′00″E
- Chairman: Edvardas Jokantas
- Manager: vacant
- League: III Lyga (Šiauliai)
- 2021: 8th in III Lyga, šiauliai Zone
Home colours	Away colours

Kelmės Futbolo Klubas-VJSM, commonly known as Kelmės FK-VJSM, is a Lithuanian football club located in Kelmė, center of Kelmė District. During the 2015 and 2016 seasons in the I Lyga, the team was known as Kražantė. In 2019 season the club is playing in the II Lyga Western Zone.

== History ==
The team was established in 2006 as VJSM Kelmė, VJSM being an abbreviation for Children and Youngsters Sports School. The team started in the 4th tier of the Lithuanian football.

In 2010, the team was renamed to "Kaslita" for sponsorship reasons.

In 2011, the club qualified for the II Lyga, Western zone, the third tier of Lithuanian football.

In the 2015 and 2016 seasons, VJSM Kelmė contested in the I Lyga. During this time, match fixing scandals took place and some players were disqualified from participating in any football activities. In 2017, the team lost sponsorship from the municipality of Kelmė and was relegated to the III Lyga.

In 2018, the team changed its name to Kelmės FK-VJSM and played in the III Lyga. The team finished the season in seventh place. Gilbertas Kerpė and Deividas Nikolajevas scored three goals, making them the top scorers in the team.

In 2019, the club applied for a license to participate in II Lyga, and was granted one. The team is playing in the Western Zone, which comprises 10 teams.

== Confusion about the use of name "Kražantė" ==
- To the end of the 2006 season, there was another basketball and football club in Kelmė, named "Kražantė". This club was dissolved at the end of the 2006 season.
- At the beginning of the 2006 season, VJSM or Kelmės FK-VJSM was formed. This club used the name Kražantė between 2013 and 2017, but they remained a different entity from FK Kražantė Kelmė.

== Historical names ==
- 2006 – Kelmės VJSM
- 2008 – Kelmės FK-VJSM
- 2010 – Kelmės Kaslita
- 2013 – Kelmės Kražantė
- 2018 – Kelmės FK-VJSM

== Honors ==
In the 2015 and 2016 seasons, Kelmės FK-VJSM (in that period was known as Kražantė) played in the I Lyga and finished seasons at 13th position.

=== Colors ===
Black, yellow, and green.

KELMĖS FK-VJSM	KELMĖS FK-VJSM	KELMĖS FK-VJSM

=== Kit changes ===
Traditional 2006–2012	2015–2016 Home	2015–2016; Away	2017—present Home kit	2017-present Away kit

== Recent seasons ==
Season	Division	Place
2014	II Lyga (Vakarai)	5
2015	LFF I lyga	13
2016	LFF I lyga	13
2017	III Lyga (Šiauliai)	9
2018	III Lyga (Šiauliai)	7
2019	II Lyga (Vakarai)	8
2020	III Lyga (Šiauliai)	2
2021	III Lyga (Šiauliai)	8

== Stadium ==
Kelmės FK-VJSM play their home matches in Kelmė Stadium. The current capacity of the stadium is 300 seats.

== Current squad ==
The list of squad members as of August 7, 2018.

- Lukas Jurgėlas
- Arūnas Korsakas
- Tomas Januška
- Lukas Jakštas
- Modestas Bučas
- Modestas Gedminas
- Kornelijus Petrauskas
- Ignas Dauskurdis
- Aurimas Černakauskas
- Dominykas Petrauskas
- Edgaras Jasiulaitis
- Gilbertas Kerpė
- Deividas Nikolajevas
