= Marijampolė City =

Football club in Marijampolė, Lithuania

- Full name: Sudovian Youth Football Academy
- Founded: 2018; 7 years ago
- Chairman: Stela Omilevičienė
- League: I Lyga
- 2022: 5th
- Website: http://www.mcity.lt
Home colours	Away colours

Marijampolė City, FA Suvalkija, Suvalkijos jaunimo futbolo klubo akademija (Sudovian Youth Football Academy) is a football club based in the city of Marijampolė, Lithuania.

In 2022 Marijampolė City merged with the second tier I Lyga club FK Šilas Kazlų Rūda. The merger kept Marijampolė City name.

== History ==
- 2018 - the club was founded as a football academy by the initiative of football enthusiasts, parents and businessmen. The club have set ambitious goals to become nationally and internationally renown academy.
- 2019 - the club applied for the II Lyga license and was granted one. The club took fifth place in II Lyga Southern Zone.
- 2020 – obtained II Lyga license, but later abandoned plans to compete. The academy continued to work only with children and youth.

=== 2022 season ===
At the beginning of 2022, Marijampolė City merged with I Lyga club FK Šilas (Futbolo klubas Šilas). FK Šilas have been having disputes over funding with Kazlų Rūda city council, and after the merger moved to Marijampolė. As Marijampolė City did not have a senior team at this time, the senior team was essentially FK Šilas, rebadged to Marijampolė City. The club applied to the Lithuanian Football Federation (LFF) with a request to change its name and logo, and the request was granted. New club name and logo came into use from the start of round 6 in the I Lyga and from the start of the first round in the Hegelmann LFF Cup.

== Seasons ==
Season	Level	League	Position	@	LFF Cup
2019	3.	Antra lyga (Pietų zona)	5th		Round 1 of 16
2022.	2.	Pirma lyga	5th		Quarterfinals

== Current squad ==
As of 12 February 2023

Note: Flags indicate national team as defined under FIFA eligibility rules; some limited exceptions apply. Players may hold more than one non-FIFA nationality.

No.	Pos.	Nation	Player
13	MF	GEO	Luka Koberidze
17	FW	LTU	Lukas Tupčiauskas
—	GK	LTU	Povilas Kučauskas
—	DF	LTU	Emilis Galeckas
—	DF	LTU	Dovydas Kazlauskas
—	DF	LTU	Naglis Kulikauskas
—	DF	LTU	Mangirdas Rutkauskas
—	DF	LTU	Gytis Urba
—	DF	LTU	Žilvinas Zubrickas
—	MF	LTU	Audrius Brokas

No.	Pos.	Nation	Player
—	MF	LTU	Tomas Janušauskas
—	MF	LTU	Deividas Karpavičius
—	MF	LTU	Paulius Kuconis
—	MF	LTU	Tadas Kvietkauskas
—	MF	LTU	Džiugas Omilevičius
—	MF	LTU	Tomas Krunkaitis
—	FW	LTU	Evaldas Grigaitis
—	FW	LTU	Artūras Pečiulis
—	FW	LTU	Žygimantas Pečkys
—	FW	LTU	Povilas Savickas
