= Davydas Arlauskis =

Lithuanian footballer

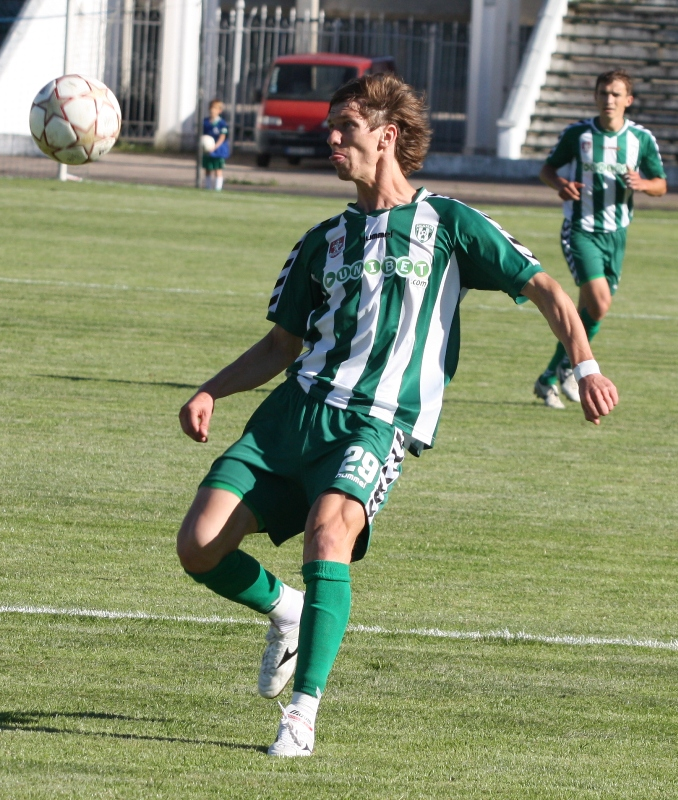

Personal information
- Full name: Davydas Arlauskis
- Date of birth: 18 November 1986 (age 39)
- Place of birth: Telšiai, Lithuanian SSR, Soviet Union
- Height: 1.87 m (6 ft 2 in)
- Position: Defender

Youth career
- Mastis Telšiai

Senior career*
| Years | Team | Apps | (Gls) |
| 2005–2008 | FK Šiauliai | 32 | (0) |
| 2008 | Unirea Urziceni | 0 | (0) |
| 2008–2010 | FK Banga Gargždai | 12 | (1) |
| 2010–2011 | FK Žalgiris Vilnius | 21 | (0) |
| 2011–2012 | Tauras Tauragė | 24 | (1) |
| 2012–2013 | FK Atlantas | 19 | (0) |
| 2013–2014 | FK Kruoja Pakruojis | 24 | (0) |
| 2014 | FK Banga Gargždai | 19 | (1) |
| 2014–2015 | MRU-TiuMenas | 0 | (0) |
| 2015–2016 | Egersund | 0 | (0) |
| 2016–2022 | Džiugas | 96 | (7) |
| Total | | 247 | (10) |

International career^{‡}
| 2005–2007 | Lithuania U21 | 5 | (0) |
- * Club domestic league appearances and goals as of 22 July 2026 ‡ National team caps and goals as of 5 June 2007

Davydas Arlauskis (born 18 November 1986 in Telšiai, USSR) is a Lithuanian former footballer, who played as defender.

His brother Giedrius Arlauskis is also a footballer.
