= Nikolaj Misiuk =

Lithuanian footballer (born 1987)

Personal information
- Date of birth: 4 January 1987 (age 39)
- Place of birth: Vilnius, Lithuanian SSR
- Height: 1.95 m (6 ft 5 in)
- Position: Forward

Youth career
- 2003–2004: Žalgiris Vilnius

Senior career*
Years	Team	Apps	(Gls)
2004	Žalgiris Vilnius	2	(0)
2005–2006	Tom Tomsk	0	(0)
2007–2008	Žalgiris Vilnius	32	(3)
2008	Doxa Drama	5	(0)
2009	Znicz Pruszków	10	(0)
2009	Trans Narva	3	(0)
2010	Neman Grodno	11	(1)
2010	FBK Kaunas	4	(0)
2011	Tauras Tauragė	19	(6)
2011	POL/AE Maroni		
2012	Zagłębie Sosnowiec	11	(0)
2012–2013	Trakai	26	(14)
2014–2015	MRU Vilnius	11	(6)
2015	Lokomotyvas Radviliškis	15	(9)
2016	Vilnius Vytis	14	(12)
2016	Lokomotyvas Radviliškis	11	(8)
2017–2018	Vilnius Vytis	40	(19)
- * Club domestic league appearances and goals

Nikolaj Misiuk (born 4 January 1987) is a Lithuanian former professional footballer who played as a forward.

== Career ==
Born in Vilnius, he made 58 appearances in the A Lyga for Žalgiris, FBK Kaunas and Tauras Tauragė. Misiuk also played in the Meistriliiga for Narva Trans and the Belarusian Premier League for Neman Grodno. In 2011, he made one appearance in the second qualifying round of the UEFA Europa League, and spent time on trial with Plymouth Argyle.
