= Pakruojis Manor =

Lithuanian architectural site

Coordinates: 55°59′10″N 23°52′45″E

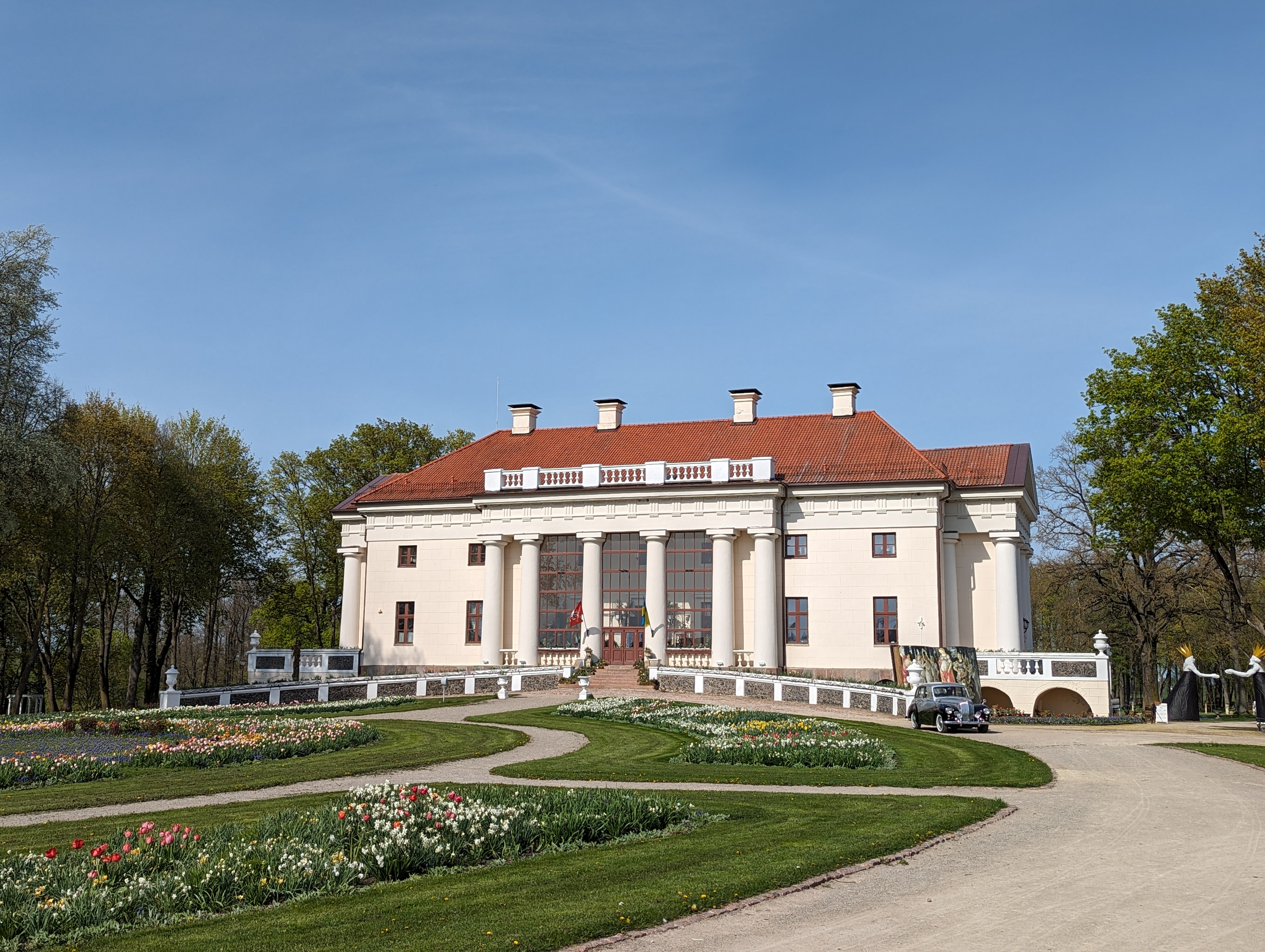
Pakruojis Manor

Pakruojis Manor is a former residential manor 2 kilometers from Pakruojis, Lithuania, on the right bank of the Kruoja river. Built in the 19th century currently it is reconstructed and used as a hotel, restaurant and a tourist attraction.

== Gallery ==
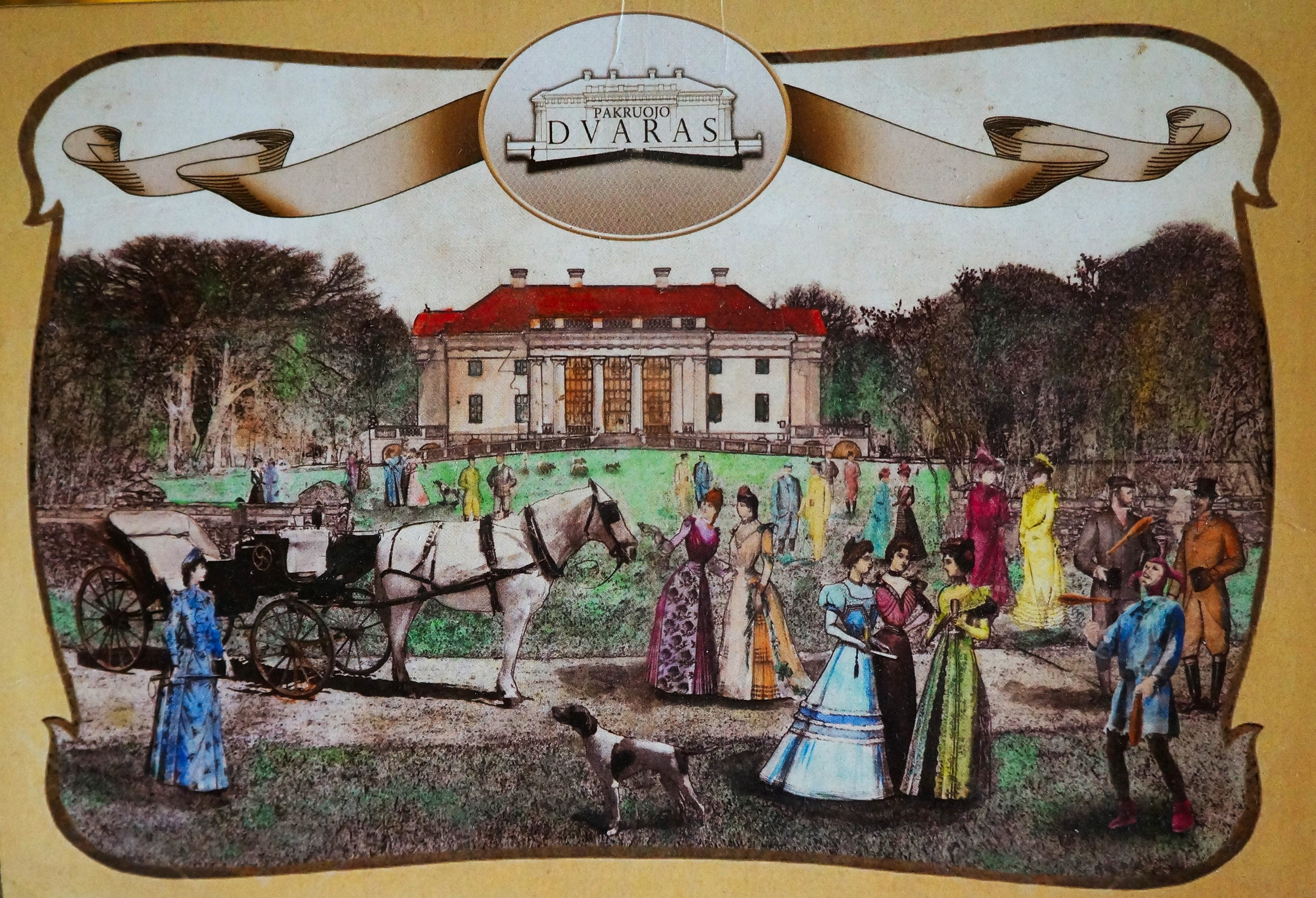
Painting of the manor and the park

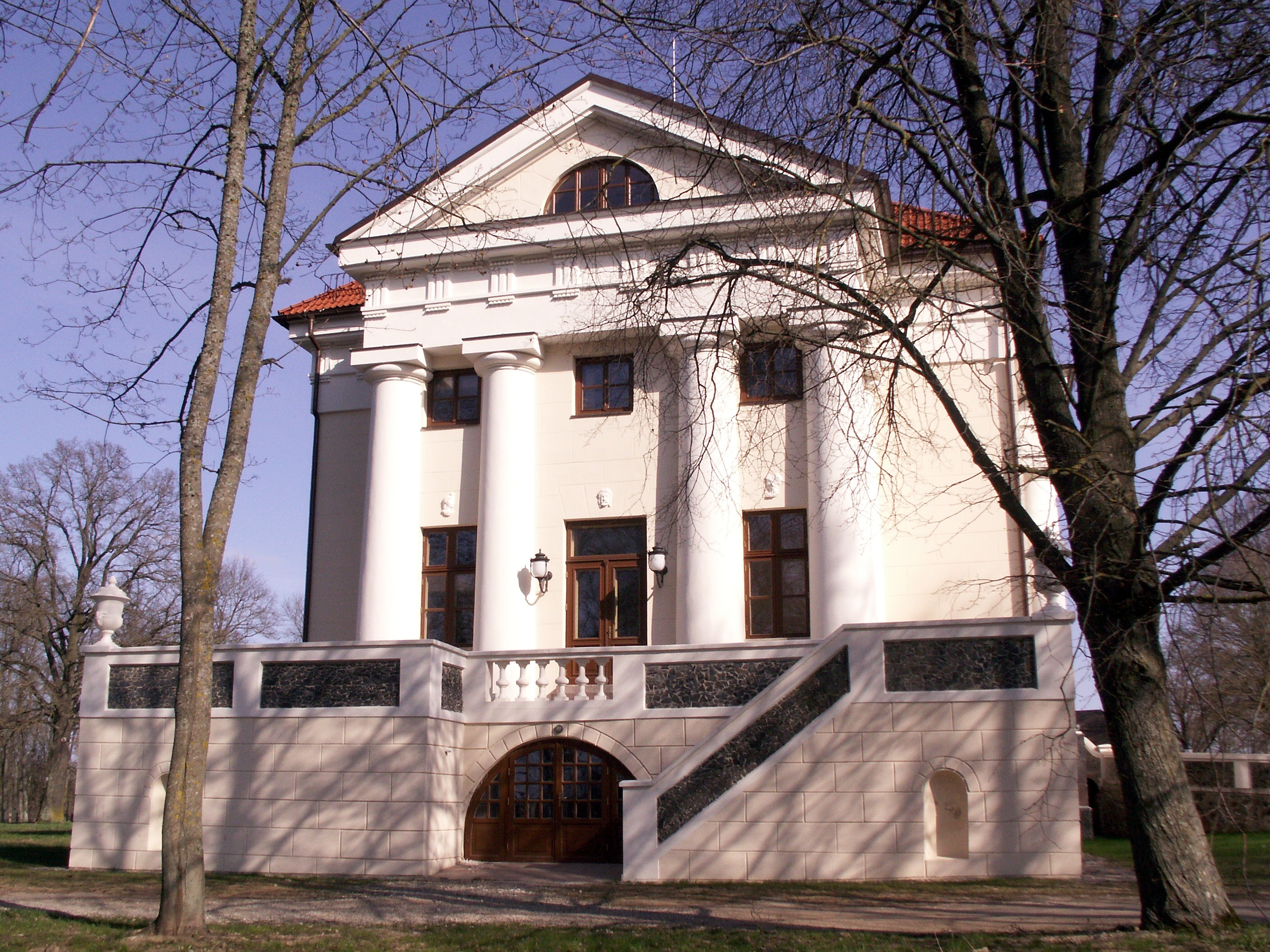
Western facade

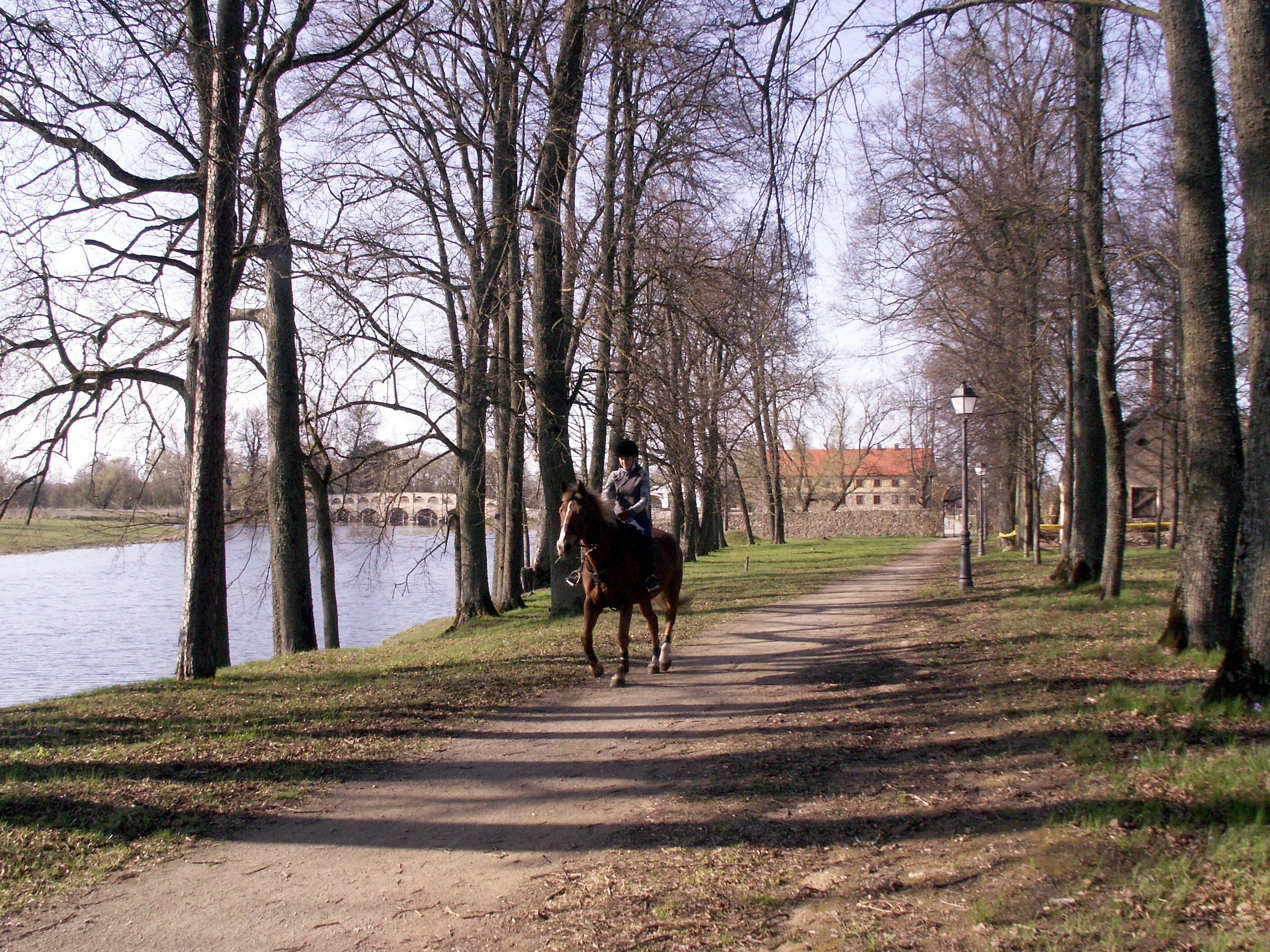
Riding in the manor park

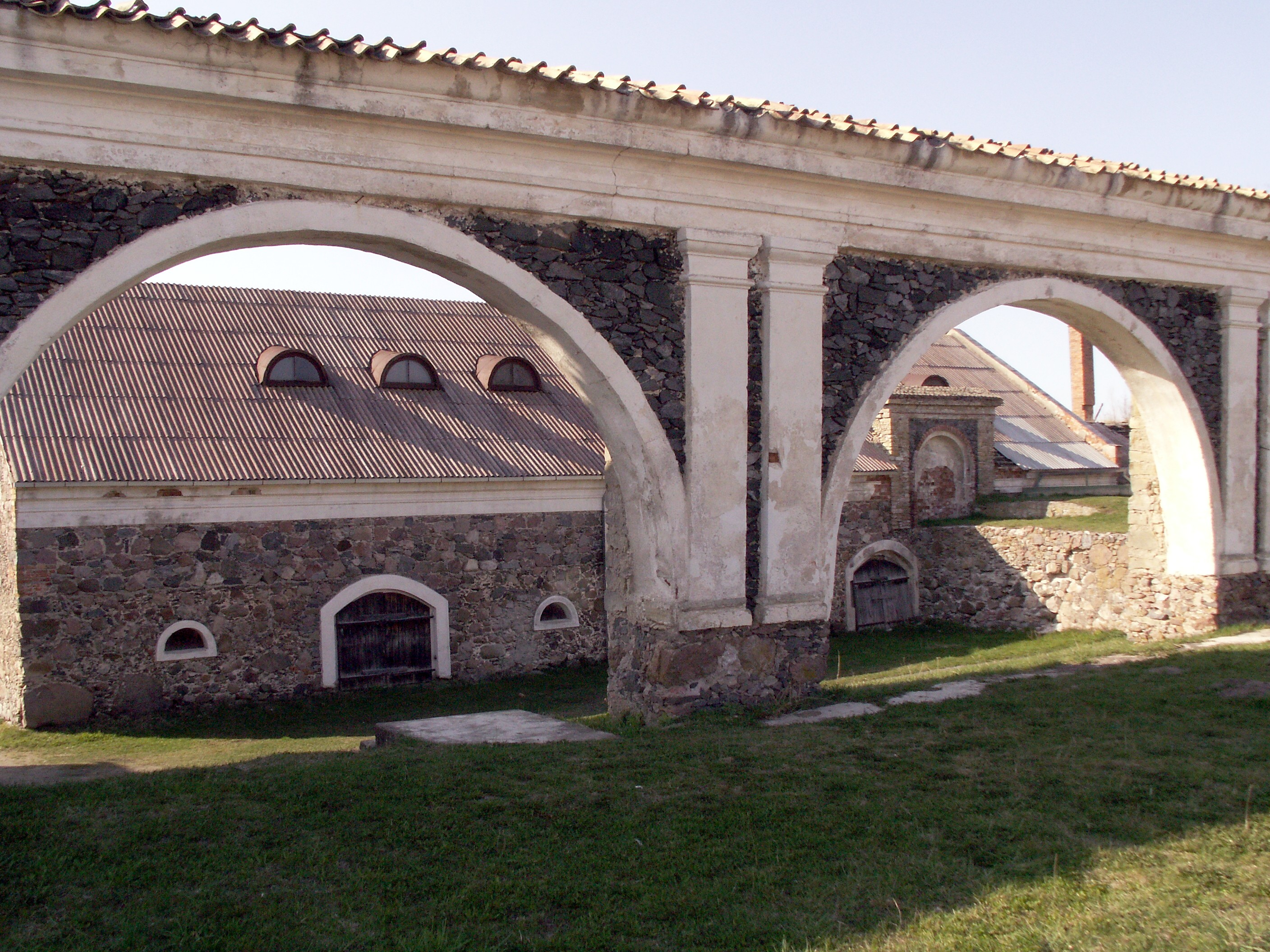
Arcade

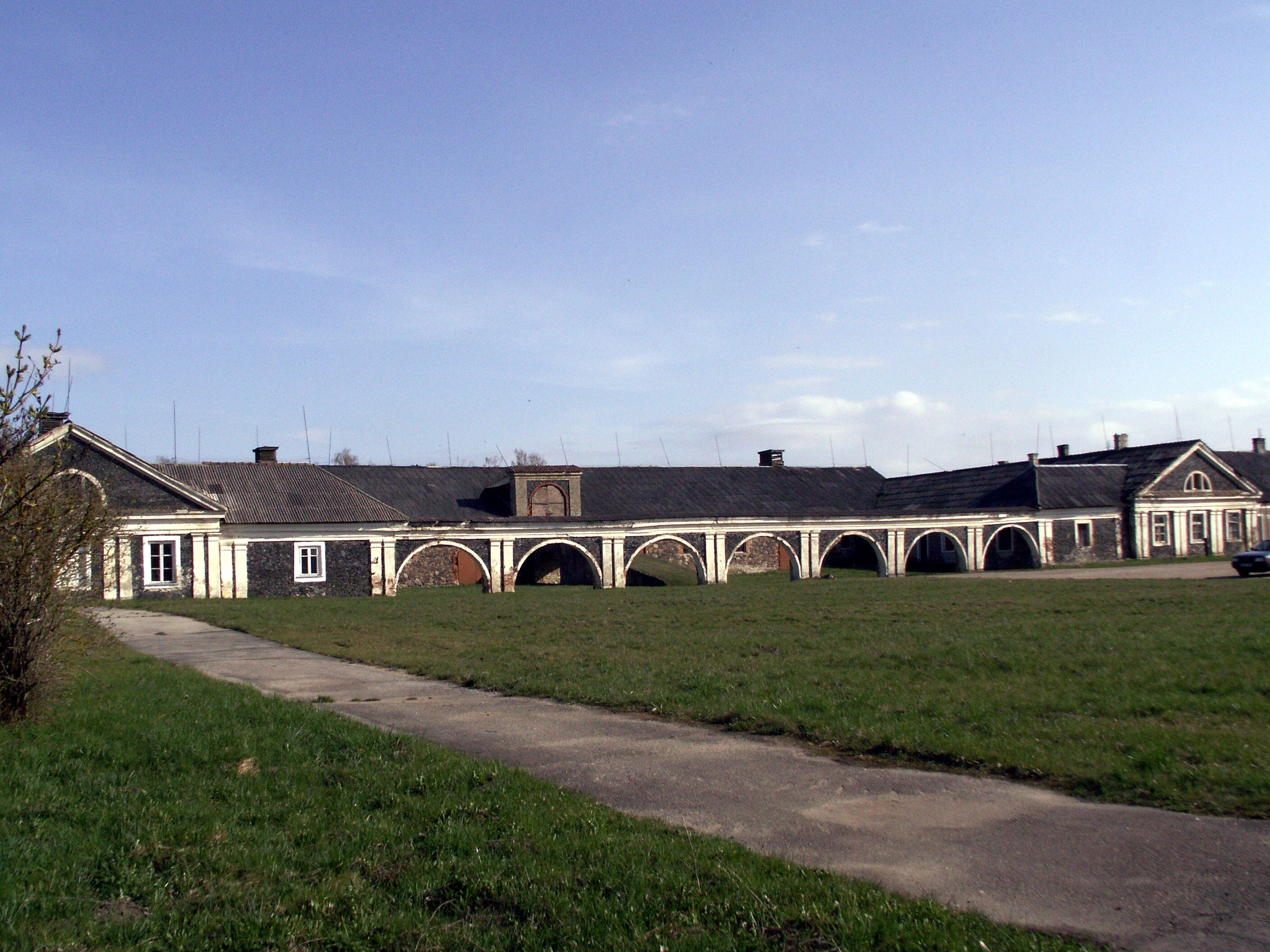
Outbuildings

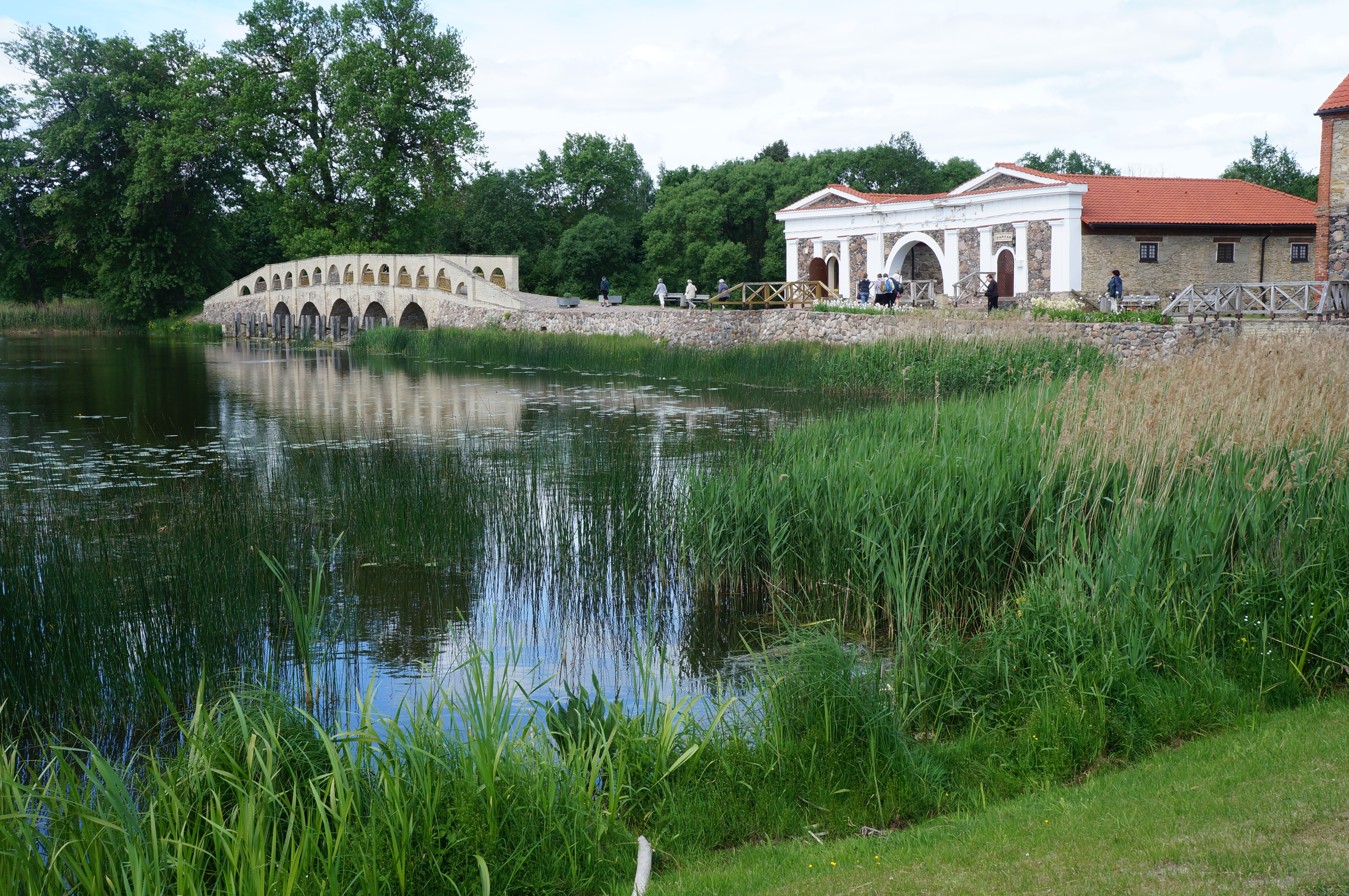
Bridge

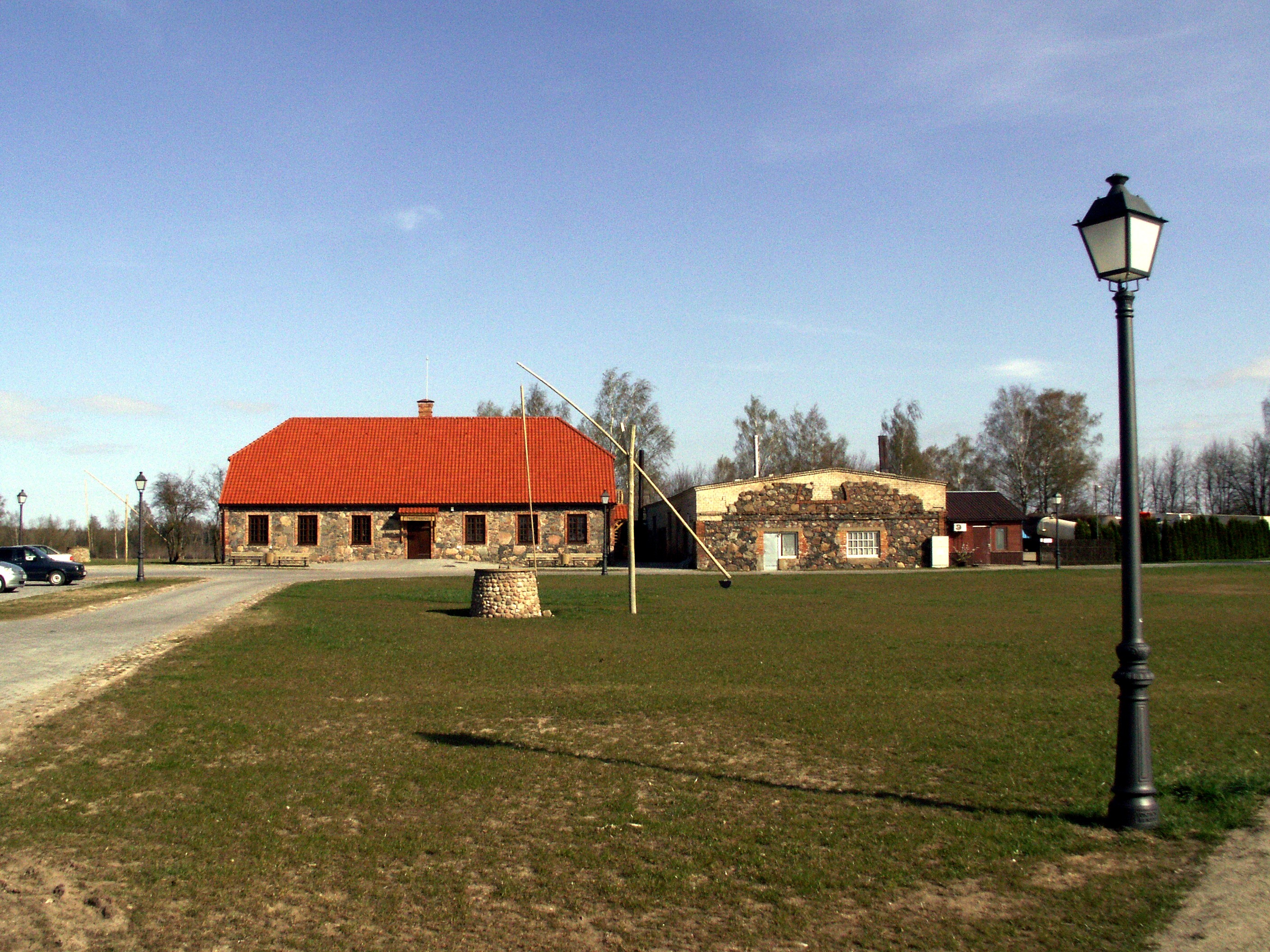

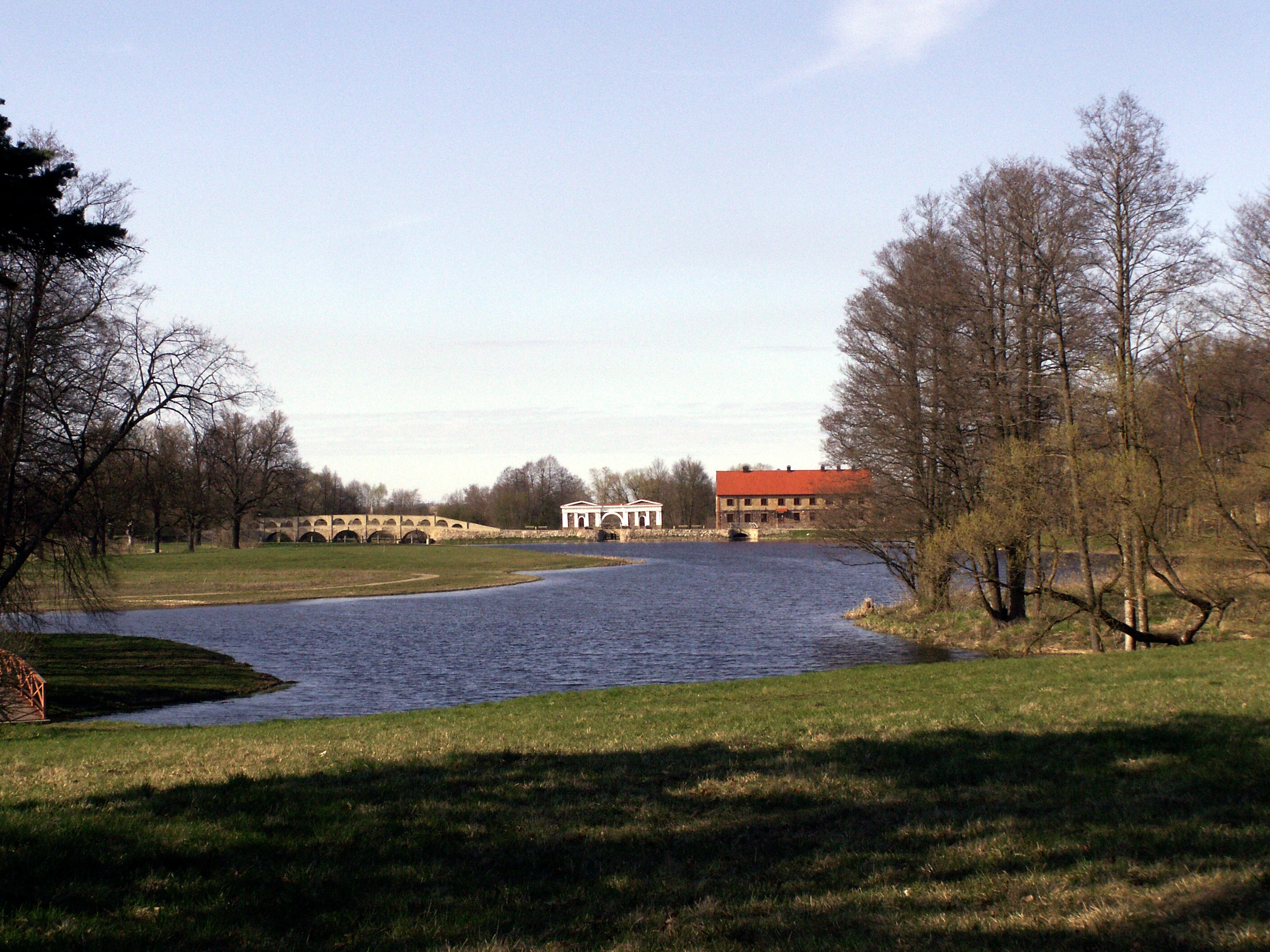
Ponds

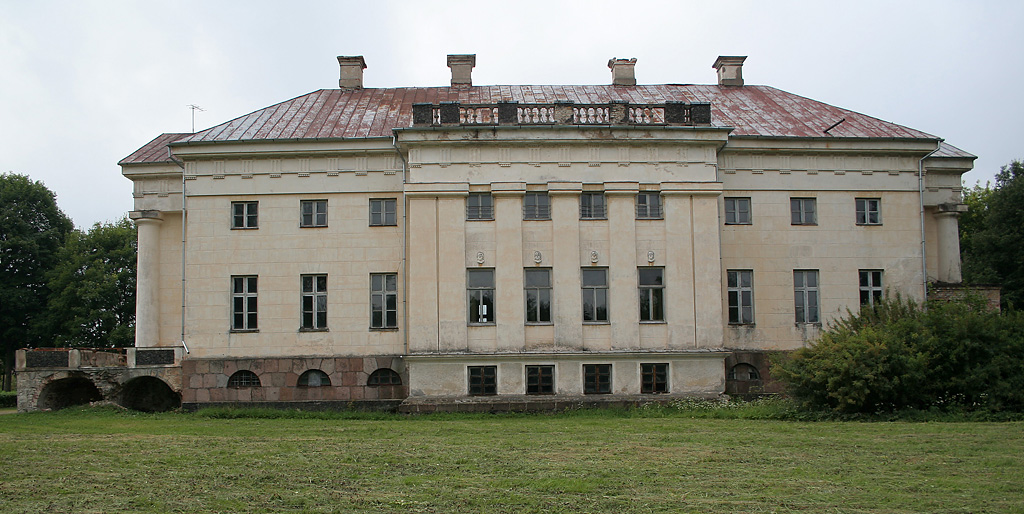
Before reconstruction
