= Kazlų Rūda Air Base =

Kazlų Rūda
- IATA: none; ICAO: EYKR

Summary
- Airport type: Military
- Owner: Soviet Air Forces, Lithuanian Air Force
- Location: Kazlų Rūda
- Elevation AMSL: 243 ft / 74 m
- Coordinates: 54°48′24″N 023°31′54″E

Maps
- Location of the airport in Lithuania
- Interactive map of Kazlų Rūda

Runways
Direction	Length		Surface
Direction	ft	m	Surface
		2,250	Concrete

Kazlų Rūda Air Base (Lithuanian: Kazlų Rūdos aerodromas) is an air strip in Lithuania located 5 km northeast of Kazlų Rūda. It was built from 1975 during the Soviet times for military purposes and officially opened in 1977. The concrete runway was 2,250 metres (7,380 ft) in length. The site was used by the Soviet 7th Guards Mountain Air Assault Division. It had a secret underground facility that became publicly known only in 1993 when last Soviet soldiers left the compound. Today it is abandoned.

In 2012 British investors proposed converting the site into a Formula Two race track.
