= Eugen von Keyserling =

Baltic-German arachnologist (1832–1889)

Eugen von Keyserling (22 March 1833 in Pockroy, Lithuania – 4 April 1889 in Dzierżoniów, Silesia) was a Baltic-German arachnologist.

He studied in the University of Tartu.

He was the author of Die Spinnen Amerikas, and completed Die Arachniden Australiens (1871–1883) on behalf of Ludwig Carl Christian Koch.
