= Pakruojis Stadium =

Multi-purpose stadium in Pakruojis, Lithuania

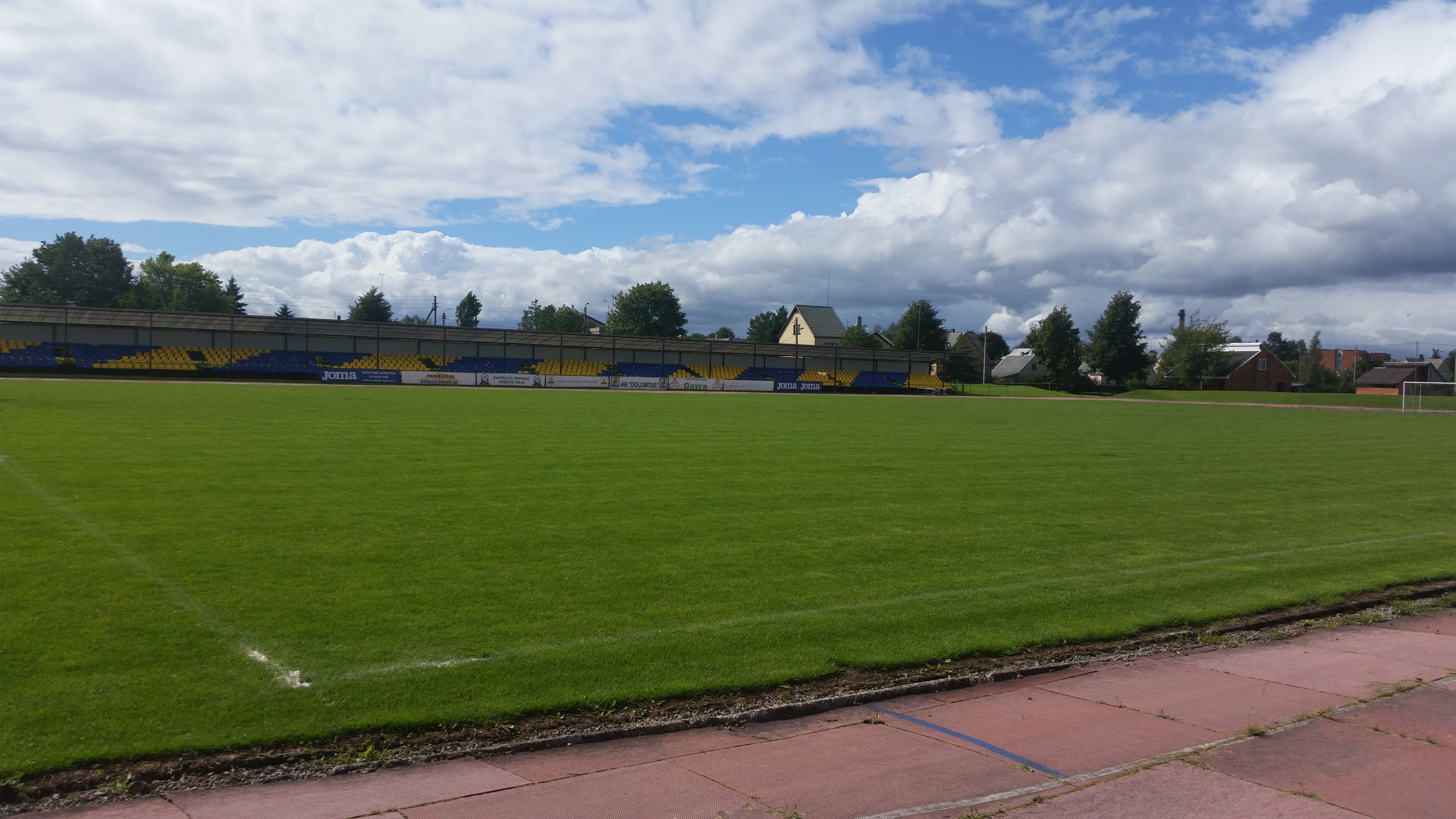
- UEFA Category 1 stadium
- Interactive map of Pakruojis Stadium
- Full name: Pakruojis City Stadium
- Address: Stadiono g. 1
- Location: Pakruojis, Lithuania
- Coordinates: 55°58′57.0″N 23°51′53.5″E
- Owner: Pakruojis District Municipality
- Capacity: 2,000
- Surface: Grass

Construction
- Built: 1989
- Expanded: 2010

Tenant
- FC Pakruojis (I Lyga)

Pakruojis City Stadium is a multi-purpose stadium in Pakruojis, Lithuania. It opened in 1989 and is used mostly for football matches. It is the home arena for FC Pakruojis and former A Lyga club FK Kruoja.

In 2010 stadium was renovated. Capacity was increased to 2,000 seats, new technical area added. It currently holds 1st UEFA stadiums category.
