= Maksim Lukashevich =

Belarusian footballer

Personal information
- Date of birth: 28 March 1992 (age 34)
- Place of birth: Belarus
- Height: 1.80 m (5 ft 11 in)
- Position: Forward

Youth career
- 2009–2011: Minsk

Senior career*
Years	Team	Apps	(Gls)
2012	Minsk	2	(0)
2013	Tauras Tauragė	24	(3)
2014	Rechitsa-2014	10	(0)
2014	Tauras Tauragė	13	(10)
2015	Šilutė	26	(21)
2016–2017	Palanga	38	(25)
2017	Koralas Klaipėda	16	(14)
2018–2019	Neman Grodno	18	(0)
2020	Svidník	0	(0)
2020	Smorgon	12	(1)
2021	Maxline Rogachev	0	(0)
2021	Neptūnas	12	(9)

International career
2012	Belarus U21	3	(0)
- * Club domestic league appearances and goals as of 31 December 2021

Maksim Lukashevich (Belarusian: Максiм Лукашэвiч; Russian: Максим Лукашевич; born 28 March 1992) is a Belarusian footballer.

== Career ==
He started in Minsk. later he moved to Lithuania and played for Tauras Tauragė, Šilutė, Palanga and Koralas Klaipėda.

In 2020 he signed with Smorgon. However, he left in March 2020 to join 1. FK Svidník in Slovakia. However, due to the COVID-19 pandemic, he never played an official game for the club. After returning to Belarus in the summer 2020, he joined Smorgon.

In February 2021, he joined Maxline Rogachev and in the summer 2021 he returned to Lithuania and signed with Neptūnas.
