= FK MRU Vilnius =

Lithuanian football club

- Full name: FK MRU Vilnius
- Founded: 2012
- Ground: LFF stadium, Vilnius
- Capacity: 5067
- Chairman: Alvidas Raškauskas
- Manager: Gediminas Paberžis
- 2015: 14th, LFF I lyga

FK MRU Vilnius was a Lithuanian football team. The team plays in the Lithuanian Football Cup.

== Current squad ==
Note: Flags indicate national team as defined under FIFA eligibility rules; some limited exceptions apply. Players may hold more than one non-FIFA nationality.

No.	Pos.	Nation	Player
1	GK	LTU	Andžej Likša
2	DF	LTU	Tomas Statkevičius
4	DF	LTU	Romanas Juška
5	DF	LTU	Rokas Janilionis
7	FW	LTU	Paulius Osauskas
9	FW	LTU	Nikolaj Misiuk
10	MF	LTU	Erikas Grigaitis
11	MF	LTU	Gediminas Paberžis
12	GK	LTU	Vaidas Sabaliauskas
13	MF	LTU	Tomas Misiūnas
14	MF	CMR	Serge Tatiefang
15	MF	RUS	Ivan Makotra

No.	Pos.	Nation	Player
16	MF	LTU	Vilius Drazdauskas
17	MF	LTU	Arminas Lukoševičius
18	MF	LTU	Daniel Sadovski
19	MF	LTU	Edvardas Pšelenskis
21	MF	LTU	Deivydas Malkevičius
22	FW	LTU	Tadas Švaikevičius
23	DF	LTU	Ruslanas Kliukoitis
25	DF	LTU	Paulius Drublionis
28	GK	LTU	Arnold Gudalevič
29	DF	LTU	Ričardas Dobrovolskis
37	MF	LTU	Justinas Baltrimavičius
77	MF	LTU	Aivydas Ruškys

== Competition history ==
Lithuania

Season	Div.	Pos.	Pl.	W	D	L	Goals	Pts
2013	3rd	3	24	14	7	3	55–23	49
2014	2nd	2	24	14	5	5	54–19	47
2015	2nd	14	34	9	7	18	46–65	34
