= FK Klaipėdos Granitas =

Defunct association football club in Lithuania

- Full name: Futbolo Klubas Klaipėdos Granitas
- Founded: 2012
- Dissolved: 2016
- Ground: Klaipėdos dirbtinės dangos stadionas, Klaipėda
- Capacity: 1,000
- Manager: Donata Maksvytytė
- League: None
- 2015: A Lyga, 8th of 10 (disqualified for violations of the principles of fair play (between))
Home colours	Away colours

FK Klaipėdos Granitas was a Lithuanian football club based in Klaipėda, Lithuania. The club was founded in 2012 and dissolved in 2016 following a match-fixing scandal. It was notorious for its involvement in match-fixing and the falsification of results.
