= FBK Kaunas (2012) =

F.B.K. Kaunas
- Full name: Futbolo Bendruomenes Klubas Kaunas
- Nickname: Geltonai-Žali (Yellow-Greens)
- Founded: 2012
- Dissolved: 2016
- Ground: NFA stadionas Kaunas; Lithuania
Home colours	Away colours

Futbolo Bendruomenes Klubas Kaunas (Football Community Club Kaunas), commonly known as F.B.K. Kaunas, was a Lithuanian football club from the city of Kaunas. This phoenix club was founded in 2012 by the fans who wanted to maintain the legacy and name of FBK Kaunas, following the winding-up of FBK Kaunas.

== History ==
Unhappy with the boards decision to close the club, the supporters decided to form a new club in 2012. Futbolo Bendruomenes Klubas Kaunas was formed. F.B.K. Kaunas legally was not a successor of FBK Kaunas and it was not using original club's licence to participate in the championship. The club was rather considered to be a spiritual successor of the old club.

F.B.K. Kaunas started the 2012 season in the 4th tier. It was a huge success as Kaunas managed to get a 2nd place and by that gain promotion to the 2013 II Lyga. The 2013 season ended in a 6th-place finish and in the 2014 season F.B.K. Kaunas managed to win the II Lyga, therefore gaining promotion to the second tier of Lithuanian football. The 2015 season in I Lyga ended in a 12th place which was acceptable bearing in mind that the club had a mid-table budget. The 2016 season was a massive blow to the club as F.B.K. Kaunas ended in a 15th place and therefore got relegated.

In the beginning of 2017 the club announced that the club will not participate in any tournaments in the 2017 season due to financial problems.

== Seasons ==
=== National ===
Season	Div.	Pos.	Pl.	W	D	L	Goals	Pts	Top Scorer	Cup	Supercup	Baltic League	Europe	Notes
2012	4th	2	15	7	6	2	40–20	27	(Lithuania) Ramūnas Macežinskas	1/4	dnq	dnq	dnq	Promoted to II Lyga
2013	3rd	6	24	9	4	11	52–47	31	(Spain) Juan Sevilla	1/64	dnq	dnq	dnq	
2014	3rd	1	26	20	3	3	69–19	63	(Spain) Juan Sevilla	1/32	dnq	dnq	dnq	Promoted to I Lyga
2015	2nd	12	34	10	7	17	44–64	37	(Mexico) Josuetl Hernandez	1/16	dnq	dnq	dnq	
2016	2nd	15	30	4	1	25	25–134	13	(Lithuania) Eimantas Stonkus	1/32	dnq	dnq	dnq	Relegated to II Lyga

== Titles ==
=== National ===
- II Lyga
  - Winners (1): 2014
- III Lyga
  - Runners up (1): 2012

== Former managers ==
- (Lithuania) Artūras Ramoška (April 2012 – Jan 13)
- (Lithuania) Audrius Statkevičius (Mar 2013 – Jan 14)
- (Lithuania) Mantas Babianskas (Mar 2014 – Dec 2016 )

== Partnership ==
- (England) Thamesmead Town
