= FK Kražantė Kelmė =

Lithuanian football club

FK Kražantė
- Full name: Kelmės krepšinio ir futbolo klubas "Kražantė"
- Nickname(s): "vundertymas"
- Founded: 1926 as LFLS; 1994 as Kražantė
- Dissolved: 2006; 19 years ago
- Ground: Kelmė Stadium
- Capacity: 2,000
- Chairman: Arūnas Kazakevičius
- Manager: Kęstas Banys; Viktoras Sėjūnas
- League: II Lyga (Šiaurė)
- 2006: 2nd
Home colours	Away colours

Kražantė active sections
- Football
- Basketball

FK Kražantė (lt Kelmės krepšinio ir futbolo klubas "Kražantė") was a Lithuanian football team from the city of Kelmė. In 2001 season was in First division I Lyga. The team dissolved in 2006.

== History ==
Refounded in 1994 as part of basketball and football club "Kražantė" in Kelmė.

The team was dissolved after the 2006 season.

== Seasons ==
Season	Level	League	Place	Web	Movements
1994–1995	4.	Ketvirta lyga (Vakarai)	1.		▲ Promotion ▲
1995–1996	3.	Trečia lyga	10.		
1996–1997	3.	Trečia lyga	5.		
1997–1998	3.	Antra lyga (Vakarai)	5.		
1998–1999	3.	Antra lyga (Vakarai)	4.		
1999	3.	Antra lyga (Vakarai)	3.		
2000	3.	Antra lyga (Vakarai)	2.		▲ Promotion ▲
2001	2.	Pirma lyga	13.		▼ Relegation ▼
2002	3.	Antra lyga (Šiaurė)	6.		
2003	3.	Antra lyga (Šiaurė)	9.		
2004	3.	Antra lyga (Šiaurė)	2.		
2005	3.	Antra lyga (Šiaurė)	1.		
2006	3.	Antra lyga (Šiaurė)	2.		

== Colors ==
- Green and white. Later was green/yellow.

Kražantė	Kražantė	Kražantė

== Kit evoliution ==
Home kit (1994—2006)	Away kit (1994—2003)	Away kit (2003—2006)
