= Kazlų Rūda =

- Town
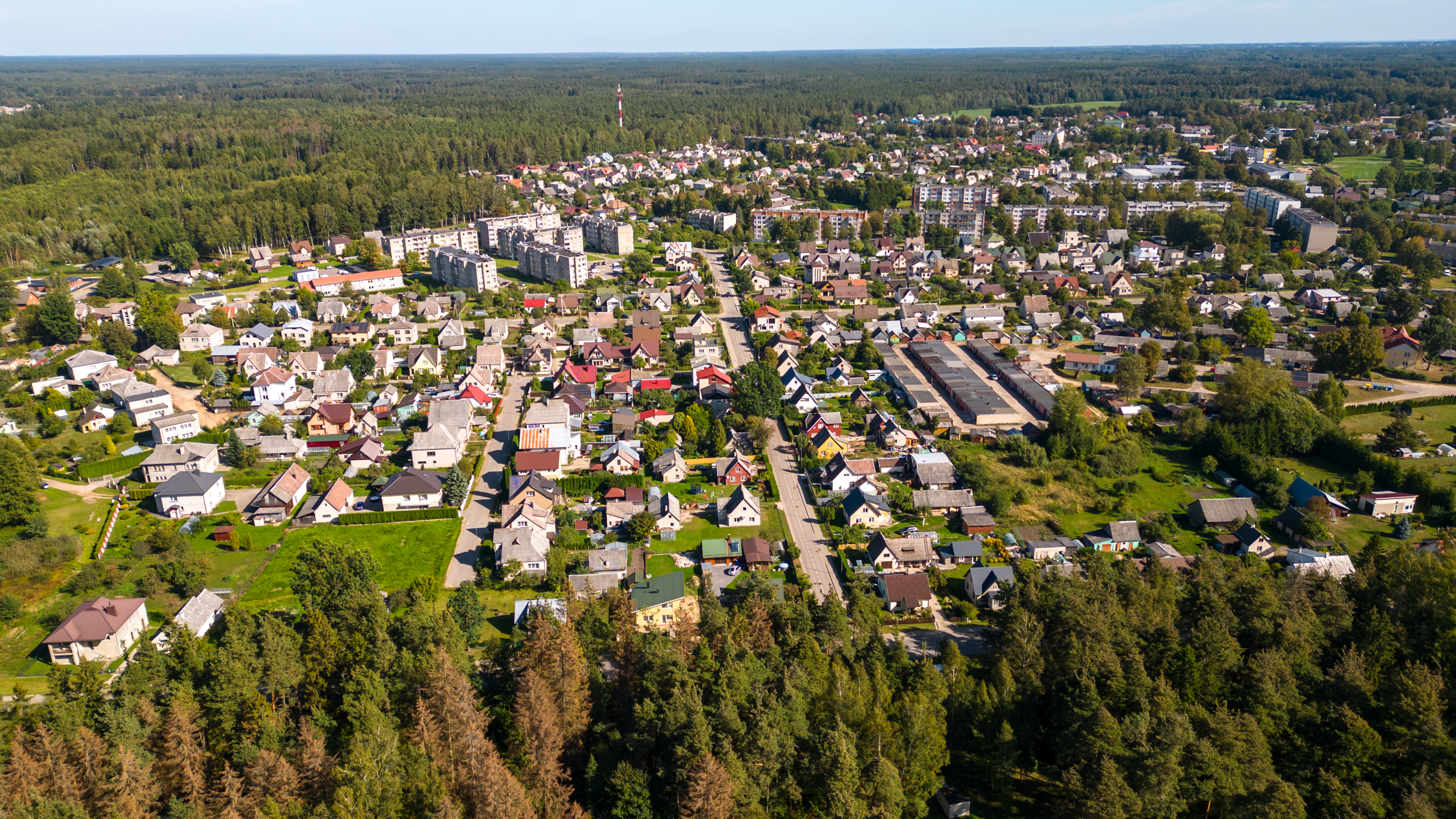
- Aerial view of Kazlų Rūda

- Coat of arms

- Location of Kazlų Rūda
- Coordinates: 54°45′0″N 23°30′0″E
- Country: Lithuania
- Ethnographic region: Suvalkija
- County: Marijampole County
- Municipality: Kazlų Rūda municipality
- Eldership: Kazlų Rūda eldership
- Capital of: Kazlų Rūda municipality Kazlų Rūda eldership
- First mentioned: 1744

Government
  - Mayor: Mantas Varaška

Population (2020)
  - Total: 5,666
- Time zone: UTC+2 (EET)
  - Summer (DST): UTC+3 (EEST)
- Website: Official website

Kazlų Rūda is a city in the Marijampole County in southern Lithuania. It is located 27 km (17 miles) north from Marijampolė. The city is surrounded by forests, but a railway line crosses the city and divides it into almost equal parts.

The former Soviet Army Kazlų Rūda airbase is 5 km (3.1 mi) northeast of Kazlų Rūda.

== History ==
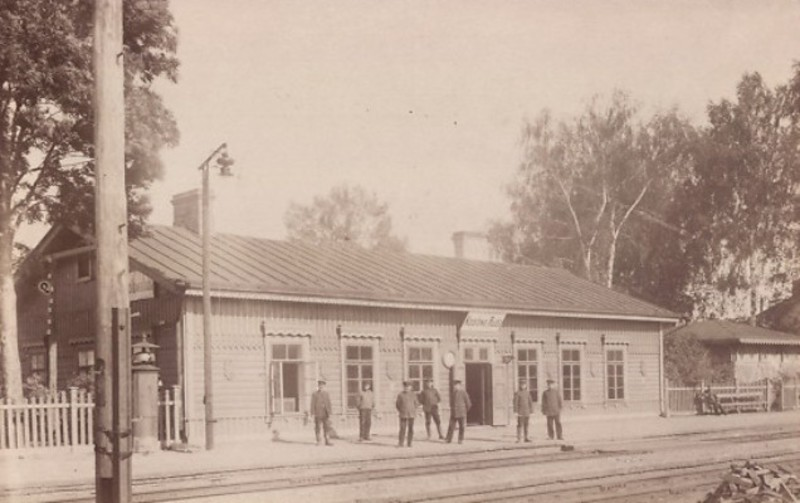
Train station during World War I

The settlement was founded by Polish Masurian grubbers. In the 19th century, iron was mined here and iron axes etc. were produced.

During World War I, it was occupied by Germany. During World War II, it was occupied by the Soviet Union from 1940, by Nazi Germany from 1941, and then once again by the Soviet Union from 1944.

== Economy ==
Inter IKEA Holding operates a manufacturing plant in the city.

== Sport ==
- FK Šilas Kazlų Rūda football club;
- FK Kazlų Rūda football club;
- Kazlų Rūdos miesto stadionas (Stadium of Kazlų Rūda);
- Sports center of Kazlų Rūda;

== Twin towns – sister cities ==
Kazlų Rūda is twinned with six cities:

- Frombork, Poland
- Sondershausen, Germany
- Lwówek, Poland
- Koriukivka, Ukraine
- Olecko, Poland
- Gołdap, Poland
