= FK Lokomotyvas Radviliškis =

Former football club in Lithuania

- Full name: FK Lokomotyvas Radviliškis
- Founded: 2012
- Dissolved: 2016; 10 years ago
- Ground: Radviliškis Sąjūdis Stadium
- Capacity: 432
- League: I Lyga
- 2015: I Lyga, 11th
Home colours	Away colours

FK Lokomotyvas Radviliškis was a Lithuanian football team from Radviliškis. The team played in the Lithuanian Football Cup and I Lyga.

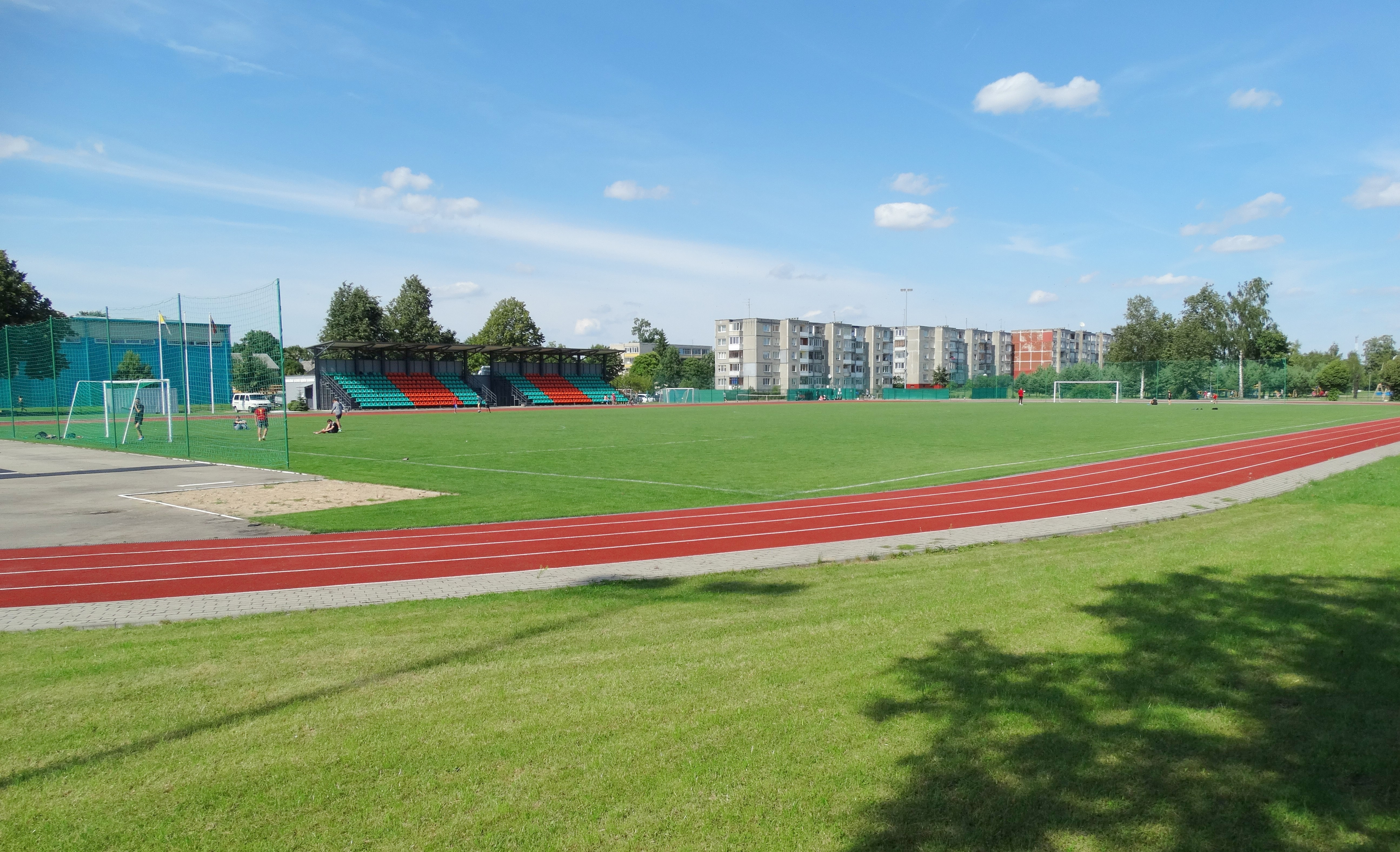
Radviliškis Sąjūdis Stadium

== Current squad ==
Note: Flags indicate national team as defined under FIFA eligibility rules; some limited exceptions apply. Players may hold more than one non-FIFA nationality.

No.	Pos.	Nation	Player
12	GK	LTU	Ronaldas Grižas
4	DF	LTU	Valdas Pocevičius
9	DF	LTU	Elvis Daraškevičius
19	DF	LTU	Saimonas Vitkauskas
20	DF	LTU	Tomas Sirevičius
88	DF	LTU	Karolis Mikutavičius
--	DF	LTU	Ignas Šapola
7	MF	LTU	Daniel Sadovski

No.	Pos.	Nation	Player
10	MF	LTU	Giedrius Barevičius
11	MF	LTU	Marius Ligeika
21	MF	LTU	Deividas Maciulevičius
29	MF	LTU	Edvinas Mučinis
85	MF	LTU	Justas Gulbinas
--	MF	LTU	Marijus Rimas
5	FW	LTU	Armantas Verbiejus
8	FW	LTU	Karolis Šidlauskis
41	FW	LTU	Tomas Bielickas
