= FK Šilas Kazlų Rūda =

Lithuanian football club

Šilas
- Full name: Futbolo klubas "Šilas"
- Nickname: Kazlųrūdiškiai
- Founded: 1940; 86 years ago
- Dissolved: 2022; 4 years ago (became Marijampolė City)
- Ground: Kazlų Rūdos miesto stadionas
- Capacity: 700
- Chairman: Vidmantas Narbutaitis
- Manager: Gediminas Jarmalavičius
- Website: www.fksilas.lt
| Home colours | Away colours |

FK Šilas was a Lithuanian football club from the city of Kazlų Rūda. The team competes in the I Lyga, in second tier of Lithuanian football since 2021.

In 2022, after a merger, the club was renamed to Marijampolė City, and moved to Marijampolė.

== History ==
Šilas was founded in 1940 as FK Ąžuolas. The club has been renamed several times in the following years.

In 2016 Šilas won I Lyga and hoped for promotion to A Lyga, but after a match fixing scandal were relegated to II Lyga. The club was officially declared entering administration, and therefore were not allowed to play in A Lyga or I Lyga. As FK Šilas lost place in A Lyga, FK Kauno Žalgiris got saved from the relegation to I Lyga.

The club finished in 10th position in II lyga in 2017, but recovered the next year and became one of the leaders of the II Lyga. In 2020 Šilas won II Lyga Southern zone championship and was promoted to 2021 I Lyga. Šilas successfully obtained 2021 I Lyga licence and reached the third place same season.

In 2022, after disputes over funding with Kazlų Rūda city council, FK Šilas struck a deal with Marijampolė City, and moved to Marijampolė.

== Honours ==
=== Domestic ===
- (Lithuania) Pirma lyga (D2)
  - Winners: 2016
- (Lithuania) II Lyga, Southernern Zone (D3)
  - Winners: 2020
  - Runners-up: 2018, 2019

== Recent seasons ==
| Season | Level | Division | Position | Link | Movements |
|---|---|---|---|---|---|
| 2012 | 3. | Antra lyga (Pietūs) | 4. | | ▲ Promotion to 2013 I Lyga |
| 2013 | 2. | Pirma lyga | 4. | | |
| 2014 | 2. | Pirma lyga | 5. | | |
| 2015 | 2. | Pirma lyga | 4. | | |
| 2016 | 2. | Pirma lyga | 1. | | ▼ Relegation to 2017 II Lyga |
| 2017 | 3. | Antra lyga (Pietūs) | 10. | | |
| 2018 | 3. | Antra lyga (Pietūs) | 2. | | |
| 2019 | 3. | Antra lyga (Pietūs) | 2. | | |
| 2020 | 3. | Antra lyga (Pietūs) | 1. | | ▲ Promotion to 2021 I Lyga |
| 2021 | 2. | Pirma lyga | 3. | | |

== Kit evoliution ==
- In 2021 team wearing Joma`s kits.
- First (home) kits is green jersey, shorts and socks.
- Second (away) kits is black jersey, shorts and socks.

=== Colours ===
- ???? – 2021

| FK ŠILAS | FK ŠILAS |

=== Kit changes ===
| 2012 (Home) | 2012 (Away) | 2016 (Home) | 2016 (Away) | 2021 (Home) | 2021 (Away) | 2021 GK home | 2021 GK away |

== Stadium ==
Club play their home matches in Kazlų Rūda Stadium (lt. Kazlų Rūdos miesto stadionas). The current capacity of the stadium is 1,000 seats.

== Current squad ==
As of 6 May 2021

Note: Flags indicate national team as defined under FIFA eligibility rules; some limited exceptions apply. Players may hold more than one non-FIFA nationality.

| No. | Pos. | Nation | Player |
|---|---|---|---|
| 1 | GK | LTU | Povilas Kučauskas |
| 3 | DF | LTU | Andrius Lekeckas |
| 4 | DF | LTU | Haroldas Serbenta |
| 5 | DF | LTU | Dovydas Kazlauskas |
| 6 | MF | LTU | Paulius Kuconis |
| 7 | MF | LTU | Mindaugas Minevičius |
| 8 | MF | LTU | Augustas Dubickas |
| 10 | FW | BRA | Higor |
| 11 | MF | JPN | Abe Kakeru |

| No. | Pos. | Nation | Player |
|---|---|---|---|
| 12 | GK | LTU | Giedrius Zenkevičius |
| 13 | MF | JPN | Hiroya Kiyomoto |
| 14 | FW | JPN | Tomochika Obara |
| 15 | DF | LTU | Ignas Raštutis |
| 17 | MF | LTU | Deividas Karpavičius |
| 19 | MF | LTU | Ignas Zigmantas |
| 20 | MF | LTU | Audrius Brokas |
| 23 | MF | LTU | Tadas Kvietkauskas |
| 29 | DF | LTU | Matas Bulota |
| 92 | DF | BLR | Ilya Tsyvilka |
| 98 | FW | LTU | Povilas Savickas |

== Staff ==
| Position | Name |
|---|---|
| Chairman | (Lithuania) Vidmantas Narbutaitis |
| Head coach | (Lithuania) Gediminas Jarmalavičius |
| Assistant coach | (Lithuania) Evaldas Grigaitis |

== Managers ==
- (Lithuania) Saulius Vikertas (unknown – 11 December 2015)
- (Lithuania) Gediminas Jarmalavičius (11 December 2015 – March 10, 2017)
- (Lithuania) Saulius Vikertas (10 March 2017 – unknown)
- (Lithuania) Gediminas Jarmalavičius (2021)

== Notable players ==
FK Šilas players who have either appeared for their respective national team at any time or received an individual award while at the club. Players whose name is listed in bold represented their countries while playing for Šilas.

Lithuania

- (Lithuania) Ričardas Beniušis
