= Pakruojis =

- City
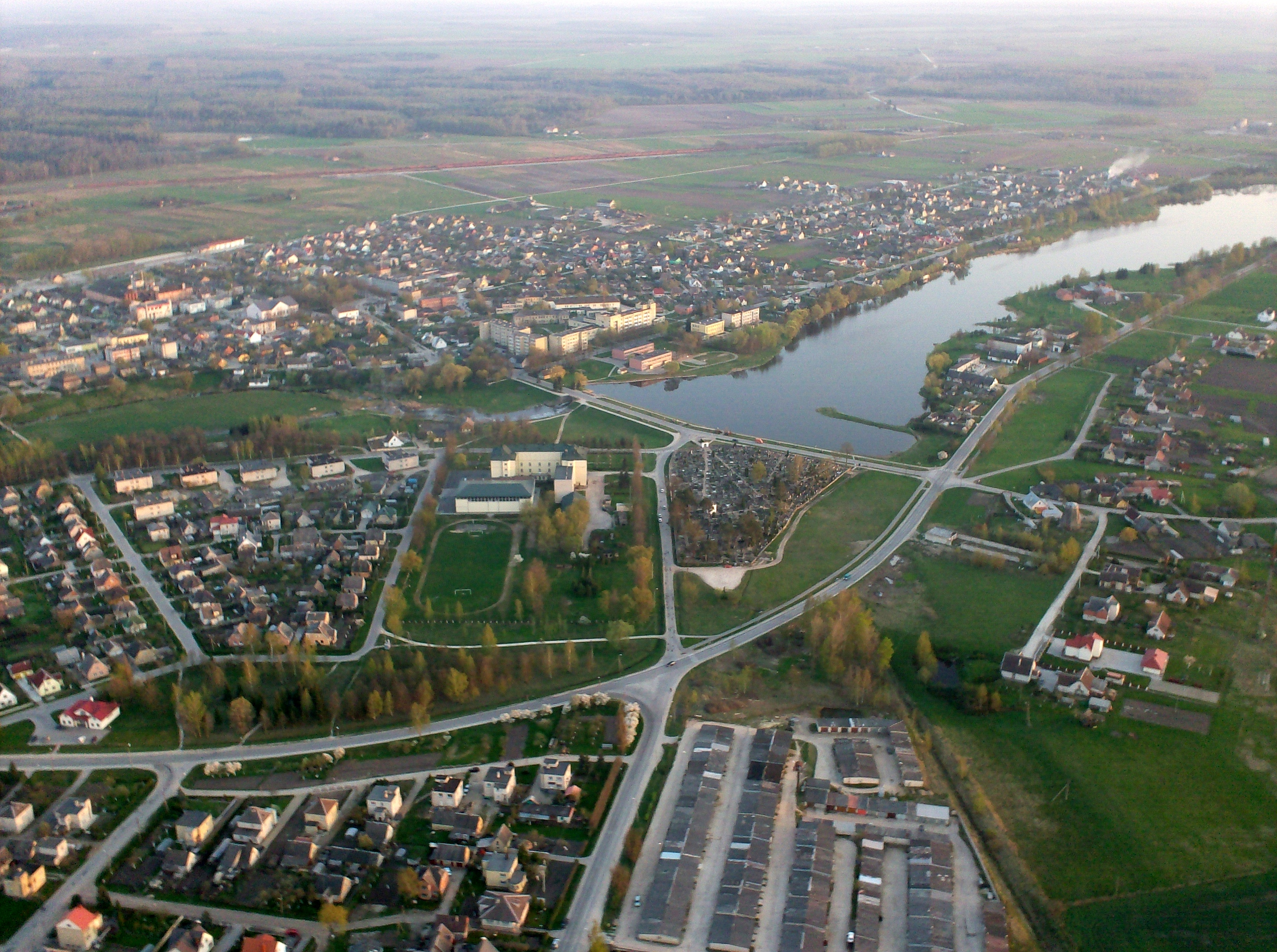

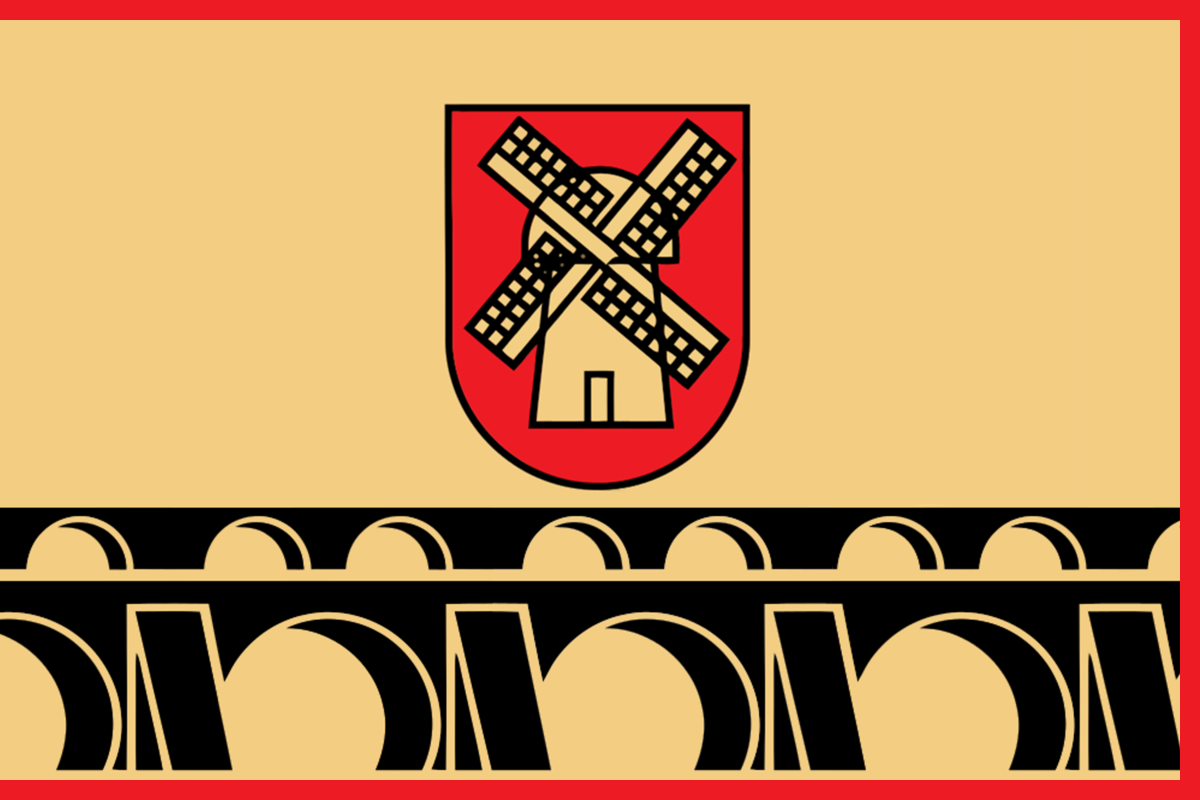
- Flag Coat of arms

- Location of Pakruojis
- Coordinates: 55°58′N 23°52′E
- Country: Lithuania
- Ethnographic region: Aukštaitija
- County: Šiauliai County
- Municipality: Pakruojis district municipality
- Eldership: Pakruojis eldership
- Capital of: Pakruojis district municipality Pakruojis eldership
- First mentioned: 1531
- Granted city rights: 1950

Population (2020)
  - Total: 4,352
- Time zone: UTC+2 (EET)
  - Summer (DST): UTC+3 (EEST)

Pakruojis is a city in northern Lithuania. It is situated on the Kruoja River, which has a dam above the city. Forty three buildings of the manor, mentioned in 1531 still survive.

== History ==
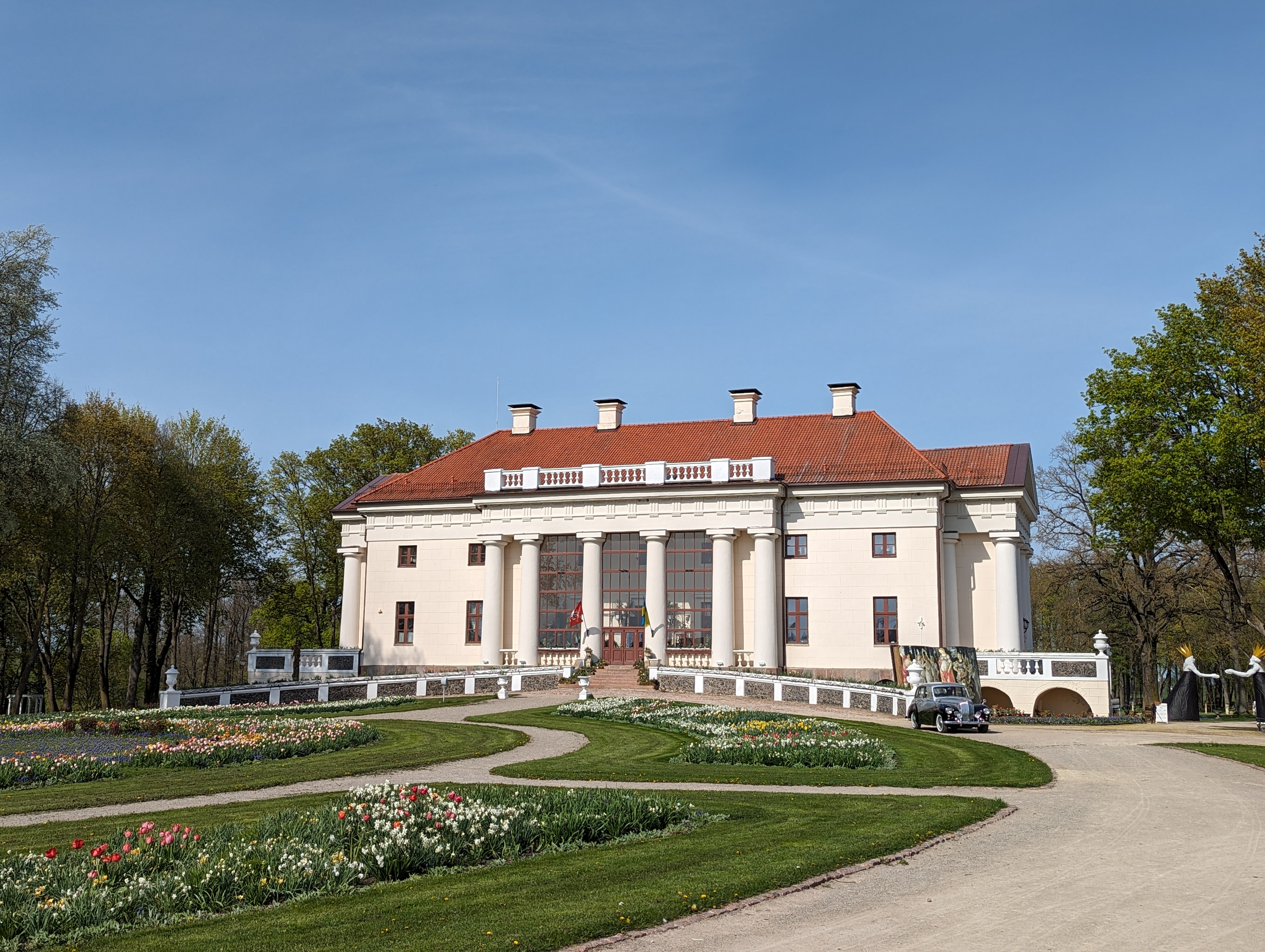
Pakruojis Manor

Pakruojis and it neighbourhood are within the boundaries of the inhabited area of the Semigallian tribe. For a long time it was thought that the town was founded in 1585, when the town and Pakruojis manor were mentioned in land ownership records. This date has entered several encyclopedias. However, historian Algimantas Miškinis discovered that Pakruojis was first mentioned in 1531. On July 10, 1613 the first church of Pakruojis had inaugural service in it new building. Sigismund III Vasa granted rights for two annual fairs.

Landowners von Ropp, who owned Pakruojis Manor from the beginning of 19th century, had a great influence on the development of the city.

In 1801 the oldest wooden synagogue of Pakruojis in Lithuania was built.

During World War II, it was occupied by the Soviet Union from 1940, then by Nazi Germany from 1941, and then re-occupied by the Soviets in 1944. In July and August, 1941, German soldiers with the help of local white armbanders massacred a total of 400 Jews from Pakruojis district in the nearby Morkakalnis forest.

Pakruojis wooden synagogue survived World War II. It is the largest and the oldest of the wooden synagogues that survives in Lithuania, but had been in deteriorating condition for a long time. On May 3, 2009 the synagogue suffered severe damage in a possible arson fire,; it underwent restoration 2014–2016 and was reopened in May 2017.

In 1950 Pakruojis was granted city rights.

In 1982 a railway from Radviliškis was upgraded and narrow railway replaced with wide railway.

In 1993 the coat of arms of Pakruojis was approved.

== International relations ==
=== Twin towns — sister cities ===
Pakruojis is twinned with:

- Mariestad, Sweden
- Bauska, Latvia

== Notable people ==
- Eugen von Keyserling (1833–1889), German-Baltic arachnologist
- Vilma Bardauskienė (born 1953), long jumper
