= 1974 LFF Lyga =

LFF Lyga
- Season: 1974

The 1974 LFF Lyga was the 53rd season of the LFF Lyga football competition in Lithuania. It was contested by 25 teams, and Tauras Siauliai won the championship.

== Group Zalgiris ==
Pos	Team	Pld	W	D	L	GF	GA	GD	Pts
1	Tauras Siauliai	24	16	5	3	49	15	+34	37
2	Pazanga Vilnius	24	12	7	5	35	21	+14	31
3	Statybininkas Siauliai	24	11	8	5	38	18	+20	30
4	Ekranas Panevezys	24	11	8	5	27	18	+9	30
5	Atletas Kaunas	24	11	6	7	28	20	+8	28
6	Banga Kaunas	24	10	6	8	30	21	+9	26
7	Ausra Vilnius	24	7	9	8	23	22	+1	23
8	Statyba Panevezys	24	5	12	7	15	22	−7	22
9	Elektronika Vilnius	24	7	7	10	15	27	−12	21
10	Inkaras Kaunas	24	6	9	9	13	25	−12	21
11	Sviesa Vilnius	24	5	6	13	21	34	−13	16
12	Politechnika Kaunas	24	6	3	15	17	43	−26	15
13	Granitas Klaipėda	24	3	6	15	14	39	−25	12

Source: rsssf.com

== Group Nemunas ==
Pos	Team	Pld	W	D	L	GF	GA	GD	Pts
1	Vienybe Ukmerge	22	16	3	3	69	17	+52	35
2	Atmosfera Mazeikiai	22	16	3	3	53	11	+42	35
3	Dainava Alytus	22	15	4	3	44	11	+33	34
4	Nevezis Kedainiai	22	16	1	5	39	19	+20	33
5	Suduva Kapsukas	22	12	4	6	29	16	+13	28
6	Sveikata Kybartai	22	10	0	12	20	35	−15	20
7	Kooperatininkas Plunge	22	6	7	9	29	38	−9	19
8	Chemikas Kedainiai	22	5	5	12	23	30	−7	15
9	Cementas N. Akmene	22	5	4	13	17	47	−30	14
10	Minija Kretinga	22	5	3	14	21	46	−25	13
11	Tauras Taurage	22	4	3	15	25	66	−41	11
12	Utenis Utena	22	3	1	18	19	52	−33	7

Source: rsssf.com

== Final ==
Pos	Team	Pld	W	D	L	GF	GA	GD	Pts
1	Tauras Siauliai	10	7	2	1	19	6	+13	16
2	Vienybe Ukmerge	10	6	2	2	16	10	+6	14
3	Atmosfera Mazeikiai	10	4	2	4	17	13	+4	10
4	Dainava Alytus	10	2	4	4	11	17	−6	8
5	Statybininkas Siauliai	10	2	3	5	11	19	−8	7
6	Pazanga Vilnius	10	1	3	6	9	18	−9	5

Source: rsssf.com
