= 1969 LFF Lyga =

LFF Lyga
- Season: 1969

The 1969 LFF Lyga was the 48th season of the LFF Lyga football competition in Lithuania. It was contested by 17 teams, and Statybininkas Siauliai won the championship.

== League standings ==
Pos	Team	Pld	W	D	L	GF	GA	GD	Pts
1	Statybininkas Siauliai	32	20	9	3	56	17	+39	49
2	Nevezis Kedainiai	32	20	7	5	63	26	+37	47
3	Inkaras Kaunas	32	18	7	7	46	20	+26	43
4	Atletas Kaunas	32	15	12	5	45	19	+26	42
5	Statyba Panevezys	32	16	9	7	50	31	+19	41
6	Lima Kaunas	32	14	11	7	48	29	+19	39
7	Politechnika Kaunas	32	15	8	9	37	26	+11	38
8	Vienybe Ukmerge	32	13	7	12	40	33	+7	33
9	Granitas Klaipėda	32	10	10	12	26	27	−1	30
10	Minija Kretinga	32	10	10	12	32	36	−4	30
11	Ekranas Panevezys	32	11	5	16	40	49	−9	27
12	Pazanga Vilnius	32	7	12	13	34	49	−15	26
13	Banga Kaunas	32	8	9	15	27	43	−16	25
14	Suduva Kapsukas	32	9	5	18	26	54	−28	23
15	Tauras Taurage	32	6	10	16	22	42	−20	22
16	Elnias Siauliai	32	3	9	20	21	57	−36	15
17	Zalgiris N. Vilnia	32	4	6	22	23	78	−55	14

Source: rsssf.com
