= 1975 LFF Lyga =

LFF Lyga
- Season: 1975

The 1975 LFF Lyga was the 54th season of the LFF Lyga football competition in Lithuania. It was contested by 26 teams, and Dainava Alytus won the championship.

== Group Žalgiris ==
Pos	Team	Pld	W	D	L	GF	GA	GD	Pts
1	Tauras Šiauliai	26	14	9	3	34	16	+18	37
2	Ekranas Panevėžys	26	14	7	5	33	24	+9	35
3	Pazanga Vilnius	26	10	14	2	31	16	+15	34
4	Atletas Kaunas	26	13	7	6	37	18	+19	33
5	Kelininkas Kaunas	26	11	9	6	37	26	+11	31
6	Politechnika Kaunas	26	12	6	8	36	29	+7	30
7	Statybininkas Šiauliai	26	9	10	7	33	24	+9	28
8	Granitas Klaipėda	26	11	6	9	31	29	+2	28
9	Sviesa Vilnius	26	8	8	10	25	28	−3	24
10	Ausra Vilnius	26	7	9	10	30	40	−10	23
11	Inkaras Kaunas	26	7	5	14	17	29	−12	19
12	Statyba Panevezys	26	5	9	12	20	39	−19	19
13	Banga Kaunas	26	3	7	16	12	34	−22	13
14	Elektronika Vilnius	26	3	4	19	12	36	−24	10

Source: rsssf.com

== Group Nemunas ==
Pos	Team	Pld	W	D	L	GF	GA	GD	Pts
1	Dainava Alytus	22	17	3	2	50	12	+38	37
2	Suduva Kapsukas	22	15	5	2	52	14	+38	35
3	Nevezis Kėdainiai	22	16	3	3	52	18	+34	35
4	Kooperatininkas Plungė	22	12	4	6	38	21	+17	28
5	Vienybe Ukmergė	22	10	7	5	44	23	+21	27
6	Atmosfera Mažeikiai	22	8	7	7	34	25	+9	23
7	Chemikas Kėdainiai	22	8	4	10	35	41	−6	20
8	Tauras Tauragė	22	8	2	12	32	57	−25	18
9	Sveikata Kybartai	22	6	3	13	29	45	−16	15
10	Cementas N. Akmenė	22	6	1	15	23	44	−21	13
11	Banga Gargzdai	22	4	1	17	15	60	−45	9
12	Minija Kretinga	22	1	2	19	9	53	−44	4

Source: rsssf.com

== Final ==
Pos	Team	Pld	W	D	L	GF	GA	GD	Pts
1	Dainava Alytus	10	6	4	0	12	3	+9	16
2	Pazanga Vilnius	10	4	3	3	12	7	+5	11
3	Suduva Kapsukas	10	5	1	4	15	10	+5	11
4	Tauras Šiauliai	10	3	4	3	7	7	0	10
5	Nevezis Kėdainiai	10	1	4	5	8	16	−8	6
6	Ekranas Panevėžys	10	2	2	6	7	18	−11	6

Source: rsssf.com
