= 1973 LFF Lyga =

LFF Lyga
- Season: 1973

The 1973 LFF Lyga was the 52nd season of the LFF Lyga football competition in Lithuania. It was contested by 26 teams, and Nevezis Kedainiai won the championship.

== Group Zalgiris ==
Pos	Team	Pld	W	D	L	GF	GA	GD	Pts
1	Pazanga Vilnius	26	17	5	4	45	18	+27	39
2	Granitas Klaipėda	26	16	3	7	47	17	+30	35
3	Atletas Kaunas	26	14	5	7	36	17	+19	33
4	Ekranas Panevezys	26	14	3	9	36	28	+8	31
5	Elektronika Vilnius	26	10	8	8	24	26	−2	28
6	Banga Kaunas	26	8	11	7	30	24	+6	27
7	Tauras Siauliai	26	10	7	9	33	28	+5	27
8	Statyba Panevezys	26	10	7	9	28	34	−6	27
9	Statybininkas Siauliai	26	8	7	11	19	21	−2	23
10	Politechnika Kaunas	26	9	5	12	21	34	−13	23
11	Inkaras Kaunas	26	6	10	10	23	31	−8	22
12	Zalgiris N. Vilnia	26	7	7	12	24	36	−12	21
13	KKI Kaunas	26	6	5	15	21	36	−15	17
14	Automobilininkas Klapeda	26	1	9	16	19	56	−37	11

Source: rsssf.com

== Group Nemunas ==
Pos	Team	Pld	W	D	L	GF	GA	GD	Pts
1	Nevezis Kedainiai	22	17	3	2	66	25	+41	37
2	Dainava Alytus	22	14	6	2	48	19	+29	34
3	Suduva Kapsukas	22	14	5	3	39	17	+22	33
4	Vienybe Ukmerge	22	9	9	4	39	18	+21	27
5	Atmosfera Mazeikiai	22	8	6	8	25	24	+1	22
6	Chemikas Kedainiai	22	8	5	9	31	29	+2	21
7	Tauras Taurage	22	7	5	10	29	38	−9	19
8	Cementas N. Akmene	22	6	5	11	23	43	−20	17
9	Minija Kretinga	22	5	6	11	27	37	−10	16
10	Kooperatininkas Plunge	22	5	5	12	29	45	−16	15
11	Sveikata Kybartai	22	5	3	14	28	58	−30	13
12	Mastis Telsiai	22	4	2	16	29	60	−31	10

Source: rsssf.com

== Final ==
Pos	Team	Pld	W	D	L	GF	GA	GD	Pts
1	Nevezis Kedainiai	10	5	2	3	16	10	+6	12
2	Granitas Klaipėda	10	5	2	3	11	7	+4	12
3	Dainava Alytus	10	3	5	2	9	7	+2	11
4	Atletas Kaunas	10	5	1	4	9	9	0	11
5	Pazanga Vilnius	10	4	2	4	5	9	−4	10
6	Suduva Kapsukas	10	1	2	7	6	14	−8	4

Source: rsssf.com

=== Playoff ===
- Nevezis Kedainiai 3-0 Granitas Klaipėda
