= 1977 LFF Lyga =

Annual soccer tournament

LFF Lyga
- Season: 1977

The 1977 LFF Lyga was the 56th season of the LFF Lyga football competition in Lithuania. It was contested by 27 teams, and Statybininkas Siauliai won the championship.

== Group Zalgiris ==
Pos	Team	Pld	W	D	L	GF	GA	GD	Pts
1	Kelininkas Kaunas	14	8	6	0	34	9	+25	22
2	Statybininkas Siauliai	14	7	6	1	19	8	+11	20
3	Tauras Siauliai	14	8	4	2	20	11	+9	20
4	Banga Kaunas	14	7	6	1	18	12	+6	20
5	Sviesa Vilnius	14	7	5	2	17	8	+9	19
6	Granitas Klaipėda	14	6	6	2	20	9	+11	18
7	Atletas Kaunas	14	7	2	5	20	20	0	16
8	Inkaras Kaunas	14	5	5	4	15	14	+1	15
9	Pazanga Vilnius	14	4	5	5	14	14	0	13
10	Statyba Panevezys	14	4	2	8	24	27	−3	10
11	Ausra Vilnius	14	2	6	6	10	16	−6	10
12	Politechnika Kaunas	14	1	8	5	8	17	−9	10
13	Ekranas Panevezys	14	0	8	6	9	21	−12	8
14	Kibirkstis Vilnius	14	1	3	10	7	34	−27	5
15	Zvejas Klaipeda	14	1	2	11	7	22	−15	4

Source: rsssf.com

== Group Nemunas ==
Pos	Team	Pld	W	D	L	GF	GA	GD	Pts
1	Vienybe Ukmerge	11	10	1	0	37	7	+30	21
2	Atmosfera Mazeikiai	11	8	3	0	22	3	+19	19
3	Nevezis Kedainiai	11	8	2	1	26	4	+22	18
4	Dainava Alytus	11	7	2	2	21	5	+16	16
5	Suduva Kapsukas	11	5	2	4	19	10	+9	12
6	Kooperatininkas Plunge	11	5	2	4	20	16	+4	12
7	Sveikata Kybartai	11	4	1	6	17	27	−10	9
8	Automobilininkas Jonava	11	4	0	7	12	40	−28	8
9	Minija Kretinga	11	3	1	7	14	26	−12	7
10	Impulsas Telsiai	11	2	0	9	12	25	−13	4
11	Tauras Taurage	11	1	2	8	10	25	−15	4
12	Banga Gargzdai	11	0	2	9	3	25	−22	2

Source: rsssf.com

== Final ==
Pos	Team	Pld	W	D	L	GF	GA	GD	Pts
1	Statybininkas Siauliai	14	9	3	2	17	10	+7	21
2	Kelininkas Kaunas	14	7	4	3	26	9	+17	18
3	Atmosfera Mazeikiai	14	7	4	3	19	15	+4	18
4	Dainava Alytus	14	7	3	4	19	12	+7	17
5	Nevezis Kedainiai	14	6	2	6	18	14	+4	14
6	Vienybe Ukmerge	14	6	1	7	28	24	+4	13
7	Tauras Siauliai	14	3	0	11	17	35	−18	6
8	Banga Kaunas	14	2	1	11	7	32	−25	5

Source: rsssf.com
