= 1976 LFF Lyga =

LFF Lyga
- Season: 1976

The 1976 LFF Lyga was the 55th season of the LFF Lyga football competition in Lithuania. It was contested by 26 teams, and Atmosfera Mazeikiai won the championship.

== Group Zalgiris ==
Pos	Team	Pld	W	D	L	GF	GA	GD	Pts
1	Ausra Vilnius	13	9	2	2	20	8	+12	20
2	Kelininkas Kaunas	13	8	3	2	22	8	+14	19
3	Pazanga Vilnius	13	7	3	3	16	8	+8	17
4	Tauras Siauliai	13	6	5	2	23	15	+8	17
5	Statybininkas Siauliai	13	6	3	4	16	9	+7	15
6	Granitas Klaipėda	13	6	2	5	19	11	+8	14
7	Statyba Panevezys	13	5	2	6	14	15	−1	12
8	Sviesa Vilnius	13	3	6	4	13	14	−1	12
9	Atletas Kaunas	13	3	5	5	12	18	−6	11
10	Inkaras Kaunas	13	3	5	5	11	18	−7	11
11	Banga Kaunas	13	3	4	6	5	10	−5	10
12	Ekranas Panevezys	13	4	1	8	12	25	−13	9
13	Elektronas Vilnius	13	3	2	8	11	21	−10	8
14	Politechnika Kaunas	13	3	1	9	9	23	−14	7

Source: rsssf.com

== Group Nemunas ==
Pos	Team	Pld	W	D	L	GF	GA	GD	Pts
1	Vienybe Ukmerge	11	8	3	0	22	5	+17	19
2	Dainava Alytus	11	8	2	1	25	9	+16	18
3	Atmosfera Mazeikiai	11	7	3	1	26	5	+21	17
4	Nevezis Kedainiai	11	6	3	2	17	4	+13	15
5	Suduva Kapsukas	11	5	3	3	23	9	+14	13
6	Sveikata Kybartai	11	5	1	5	12	7	+5	11
7	Tauras Taurage	11	3	3	5	9	16	−7	9
8	Cementas N. Akmene	11	3	3	5	7	23	−16	9
9	Kooperatininkas Plunge	11	2	2	7	11	29	−18	6
10	Minija Kretinga	11	2	2	7	6	16	−10	6
11	Banga Gargzdai	11	2	1	8	7	21	−14	5
12	Impulsas Telsiai	11	1	2	8	5	26	−21	4

Source: rsssf.com

== Final ==
Pos	Team	Pld	W	D	L	GF	GA	GD	Pts
1	Atmosfera Mazeikiai	14	8	3	3	27	14	+13	19
2	Vienybe Ukmerge	14	7	3	4	20	15	+5	17
3	Pazanga Vilnius	14	7	3	4	15	17	−2	17
4	Dainava Alytus	14	6	4	4	17	12	+5	16
5	Kelininkas Kaunas	14	7	1	6	21	14	+7	15
6	Nevezis Kedainiai	14	6	3	5	24	17	+7	15
7	Tauras Siauliai	14	4	4	6	19	25	−6	12
8	Ausra Vilnius	14	0	1	13	6	35	−29	1

Source: rsssf.com
