= 1970 LFF Lyga =

LFF Lyga
- Season: 1970

The 1970 LFF Lyga was the 49th season of the LFF Lyga football competition in Lithuania. It was contested by 17 teams, and Atletas Kaunas won the championship.

== League standings ==
Pos	Team	Pld	W	D	L	GF	GA	GD	Pts
1	Atletas Kaunas	32	22	6	4	60	16	+44	50
2	Politechnika Kaunas	32	19	6	7	45	28	+17	44
3	Nevezis Kedainiai	32	16	9	7	50	26	+24	41
4	Inkaras Kaunas	32	16	9	7	36	18	+18	41
5	Statybininkas Siauliai	32	13	13	6	42	25	+17	39
6	Dainava Alytus	32	15	8	9	37	30	+7	38
7	Vienybe Ukmerge	32	14	8	10	44	35	+9	36
8	Granitas Klaipėda	32	11	11	10	42	29	+13	33
9	Minija Kretinga	32	12	8	12	50	35	+15	32
10	Statyba Panevezys	32	12	8	12	27	29	−2	32
11	Ekranas Panevezys	32	11	7	14	29	37	−8	29
12	Banga Kaunas	32	7	14	11	31	30	+1	28
13	Lima Kaunas	32	11	6	15	38	45	−7	28
14	Pazanga Vilnius	32	9	8	15	19	42	−23	26
15	Tauras Taurage	32	8	6	18	40	66	−26	22
16	Elfa Vilnius	32	6	6	20	22	58	−36	18
17	Suduva Kapsukas	32	2	3	27	14	77	−63	7

Source: rsssf.com
