= 1968 LFF Lyga =

LFF Lyga
- Season: 1968

The 1968 LFF Lyga was the 47th season of the LFF Lyga football competition in Lithuania. It was contested by 16 teams, and Statyba Panevezys won the championship.

== League standings ==
Pos	Team	Pld	W	D	L	GF	GA	GD	Pts
1	Statyba Panevezys	30	22	8	0	69	19	+50	52
2	Nevezis Kedainiai	30	22	7	1	64	15	+49	51
3	Statybininkas Siauliai	30	18	6	6	62	19	+43	42
4	Inkaras Kaunas	30	16	6	8	54	36	+18	38
5	Atletas Kaunas	30	11	11	8	26	21	+5	33
6	Zalgiris N. Vilnia	30	13	6	11	33	42	−9	32
7	Politechnika Kaunas	30	12	6	12	45	38	+7	30
8	Elnias Siauliai	30	11	8	11	30	38	−8	30
9	Saliutas/Pazanga Vilnius	30	9	9	12	30	32	−2	27
10	Banga Kaunas	30	11	5	14	29	35	−6	27
11	Granitas Klaipėda	30	8	10	12	22	28	−6	26
12	Suduva Kapsukas	30	9	8	13	37	45	−8	26
13	Lima Kaunas	30	7	8	15	34	60	−26	22
14	Minija Kretinga	30	6	8	16	33	50	−17	20
15	Linu audiniai Plunge	30	5	3	22	30	59	−29	13
16	Autoparkas Kaunas	30	3	5	22	21	82	−61	11

Source: rsssf.com
