= 1961–62 LFF Lyga =

LFF Lyga
- Season: 1961–62

The 1961–62 LFF Lyga was the 41st season of the LFF Lyga football competition in Lithuania. It was contested by 24 teams, and Atletas Kaunas won the championship.

== Group I ==
Pos	Team	Pld	W	D	L	GF	GA	GD	Pts
1	Inkaras Kaunas	22	14	6	2	58	15	+43	34
2	Elnias Siauliai	22	12	7	3	49	27	+22	31
3	Cementininkas N.Akmene	22	12	7	3	36	22	+14	31
4	Politechnika Kaunas	22	11	4	7	49	33	+16	26
5	Linu audiniai Plunge	22	9	7	6	43	24	+19	25
6	Dainava Alytus	22	9	4	9	33	39	−6	22
7	Nevezis Kedainiai	22	8	3	11	38	47	−9	19
8	Tauras Taurage	22	7	5	10	42	51	−9	19
9	Mastis Telsiai	22	5	5	12	36	43	−7	15
10	Audra Klaipeda	22	4	7	11	25	55	−30	15
11	Ausra Vilnius	22	4	6	12	23	46	−23	14
12	Baldininkas Ukmerge	22	4	5	13	32	62	−30	13

Source: rsssf.com

== Group II ==
Pos	Team	Pld	W	D	L	GF	GA	GD	Pts
1	Atletas Kaunas	22	16	4	2	60	18	+42	36
2	Granitas Klaipėda	22	15	4	3	57	22	+35	34
3	Lima Kaunas	22	15	2	5	52	27	+25	32
4	Metalas Vilkaviskis	22	10	5	7	35	34	+1	25
5	Maistas Panevezys	22	10	2	10	63	37	+26	22
6	Kauno audiniai	22	9	3	10	38	41	−3	21
7	Elfa Vilnius	22	8	5	9	35	53	−18	21
8	Sesupe Kapsukas	22	9	1	12	42	47	−5	19
9	Raud. zvaigzde Vilnius	22	7	5	10	36	48	−12	19
10	Minija Kretinga	22	5	4	13	31	48	−17	14
11	Sakalas Siauliai	22	3	5	14	22	54	−32	11
12	Elektra Mazeikiai	22	5	0	17	36	78	−42	10

Source: rsssf.com

== Final ==
Pos	Team	Pld	W	D	L	GF	GA	GD	Pts
1	Atletas Kaunas	26	20	4	2	65	19	+46	44
2	Granitas Klaipėda	26	18	4	4	68	27	+41	40
3	Inkaras Kaunas	26	16	6	4	62	23	+39	38
4	Cementininkas N.Akmene	26	14	8	4	41	25	+16	36
5	Lima Kaunas	26	16	3	7	57	34	+23	35
6	Elnias Siauliai	26	12	8	6	53	36	+17	32
7	Politechnika Kaunas	26	12	4	10	55	40	+15	28
8	Metalas Vilkaviskis	26	11	6	9	41	42	−1	28

Source: rsssf.com
