= 1971 LFF Lyga =

LFF Lyga
- Season: 1971

The 1971 LFF Lyga was the 50th season of the LFF Lyga football competition in Lithuania. It was contested by 16 teams, and Pazanga Vilnius won the championship.

== League standings ==
Pos	Team	Pld	W	D	L	GF	GA	GD	Pts
1	Pazanga Vilnius	30	17	9	4	48	21	+27	43
2	Granitas Klaipėda	30	15	9	6	42	22	+20	39
3	Vienybe Ukmerge	30	14	10	6	44	19	+25	38
4	Minija Kretinga	30	13	8	9	40	33	+7	34
5	Atletas Kaunas	30	11	11	8	25	19	+6	33
6	Inkaras Kaunas	30	10	12	8	30	21	+9	32
7	Dainava Alytus	30	10	11	9	29	29	0	31
8	Statyba Panevezys	30	11	7	12	38	32	+6	29
9	Statybininkas Siauliai	30	9	11	10	22	29	−7	29
10	Nevezis Kedainiai	30	8	12	10	25	29	−4	28
11	Banga Kaunas	30	8	11	11	26	33	−7	27
12	Ekranas Panevezys	30	6	14	10	26	36	−10	26
13	Chemikas Kedainiai	30	9	8	13	27	43	−16	26
14	Politechnika Kaunas	30	9	7	14	37	45	−8	25
15	Drobe Kaunas	30	5	11	14	23	38	−15	21
16	Inzinerija Vilnius	30	5	9	16	23	56	−33	19

Source: rsssf.com
