= 1966 LFF Lyga =

LFF Lyga
- Season: 1966

The 1966 LFF Lyga was the 45th season of the LFF Lyga football competition in Lithuania. It was contested by 15 teams, and Nevezis Kedainiai won the championship.

== League standings ==
Pos	Team	Pld	W	D	L	GF	GA	GD	Pts
1	Nevezis Kedainiai	28	16	9	3	57	22	+35	41
2	Statybininkas Siauliai	28	16	8	4	39	20	+19	40
3	Saliutas Vilnius	28	16	6	6	41	17	+24	38
4	Inkaras Kaunas	28	15	3	10	49	31	+18	33
5	Lima Kaunas	28	12	9	7	42	34	+8	33
6	Statyba Panevėžys	28	14	4	10	41	32	+9	32
7	Elnias Siauliai	28	9	11	8	30	30	0	29
8	Linu audiniai Plunge	28	11	7	10	32	38	−6	29
9	Vimpelas Kaunas	28	8	11	9	31	25	+6	27
10	Poli Kaunas	28	9	9	10	28	26	+2	27
11	Atletas Kaunas	28	7	11	10	36	42	−6	25
12	Cementininkas N.Akmene	28	7	10	11	26	48	−22	24
13	Minija Kretinga	28	7	6	15	30	40	−10	20
14	Baltija Klaipeda	28	5	9	14	31	37	−6	19
15	Elektra Mazeikiai	28	1	1	26	9	80	−71	3

Source: rsssf.com
