= 1960–61 LFF Lyga =

LFF Lyga
- Season: 1960–61

The 1960–61 LFF Lyga was the 40th season of the LFF Lyga football competition in Lithuania. It was contested by 24 teams, and Elnias Šiauliai won the championship.

== Group I ==
Pos	Team	Pld	W	D	L	GF	GA	GD	Pts
1	MSK Panevėžys	22	17	3	2	79	26	+53	37
2	Elnias Šiauliai	22	17	2	3	60	15	+45	36
3	Linų Audiniai Plungė	22	12	4	6	45	25	+20	28
4	KPI Kaunas	22	12	3	7	50	28	+22	27
5	MSK Tauragė	22	10	5	7	37	39	−2	25
6	Žalgiris Naujoji Vilnia	22	11	1	10	42	39	+3	23
7	Spartakas-2 Vilnius/ Troleibusas Vilnius	22	9	3	10	34	54	−20	21
8	KKI Kaunas	22	8	3	11	38	29	+9	19
9	Raudonasis Spalis Kaunas	22	7	3	12	32	47	−15	17
10	Kooperatininkas Alytus	22	5	4	13	27	42	−15	14
11	EAG Kėdainiai	22	4	2	16	20	68	−48	10
12	RMG Radviliškis	22	2	3	17	23	75	−52	7

Source: rsssf.com

== Group II ==
Pos	Team	Pld	W	D	L	GF	GA	GD	Pts
1	Baltija Klaipėda	22	14	3	5	60	28	+32	31
2	Inkaras Kaunas	22	14	3	5	42	21	+21	31
3	Lima Kaunas	22	12	2	8	46	37	+9	26
4	Raudonoji Žvaigždė Vilnius	22	10	6	6	36	33	+3	26
5	Kooperatininkas Vilkaviškis	22	11	2	9	46	36	+10	24
6	Melioratorius/Laisvė Kretinga	22	9	4	9	37	41	−4	22
7	Mastis Telšiai	22	9	3	10	44	38	+6	21
8	Statybininkas Šiauliai	22	10	1	11	34	52	−18	21
9	Cementininkas Naujoji Akmenė	22	9	2	11	37	39	−2	20
10	Šešupė Kapsukas	22	8	3	11	43	42	+1	19
11	Lokomotyvas Vilnius	22	6	2	14	25	40	−15	14
12	Kooperatininkas Ukmergė	22	3	3	16	40	47	−7	9

Source: rsssf.com

== Final ==
Pos	Team	Pld	W	D	L	GF	GA	GD	Pts
1	Elnias Šiauliai	3	1	2	0	6	2	+4	4
2	Baltija Klaipėda	3	1	1	1	6	6	0	3
3	Inkaras Kaunas	3	1	1	1	6	7	−1	3
4	MSK Panevėžys	3	1	0	2	7	10	−3	2

Source: rsssf.com
