= 1972 LFF Lyga =

LFF Lyga
- Season: 1972

The 1972 LFF Lyga was the 51st season of the LFF Lyga football competition in Lithuania. It was contested by 15 teams, and Nevezis Kedainiai won the championship.

== League standings ==
Pos	Team	Pld	W	D	L	GF	GA	GD	Pts
1	Nevezis Kedainiai	28	16	7	5	45	26	+19	39
2	Pazanga Vilnius	28	17	4	7	55	30	+25	38
3	Dainava Alytus	28	14	7	7	35	19	+16	35
4	Atletas Kaunas	28	12	8	8	34	24	+10	32
5	Banga Kaunas	28	12	8	8	34	30	+4	32
6	Statyba Panevezys	28	11	9	8	30	33	−3	31
7	Vienybe Ukmerge	28	11	8	9	33	26	+7	30
8	Tauras Siauliai	28	9	12	7	30	31	−1	30
9	Statybininkas Siauliai	28	8	12	8	26	25	+1	28
10	Inkaras Kaunas	28	10	7	11	27	30	−3	27
11	Suduva Kapsukas	28	9	7	12	32	36	−4	25
12	Granitas Klaipėda	28	8	8	12	35	35	0	24
13	Ekranas Panevezys	28	5	11	12	29	42	−13	21
14	Politechnika Kaunas	28	5	6	17	18	38	−20	16
15	Minija Kretinga	28	3	6	19	17	55	−38	12

Source: rsssf.com
