= 1943–44 LFF Lyga =

LFF Lyga
- Season: 1943–44
- Champions: none (abandoned)

The 1943–44 LFF Lyga was the 23rd season of the LFF Lyga football competition in Lithuania. It was abandoned.

== League standings ==
Pos	Team	Pld	W	D	L	GF	GA	GD	Pts
1	Tauras Kaunas	14	10	2	2	41	19	+22	22
2	Perkūnas Kaunas	15	10	2	3	42	16	+26	22
3	Gubernija Šiauliai	15	10	2	3	46	30	+16	22
4	LGSF Vilnius	14	7	0	7	30	36	−6	14
5	LGSF Kaunas	15	6	1	8	45	33	+12	13
6	Kovas Kaunas	15	5	2	8	27	43	−16	12
7	MSK Panevėžys	15	4	3	8	26	43	−17	11
8	Šarūnas Vilnius	14	3	3	8	21	41	−20	9
9	LFLS Kaunas	15	2	3	10	22	39	−17	7

Source: rsssf.com
