= 1962–63 LFF Lyga =

LFF Lyga
- Season: 1962–63

The 1962–63 LFF Lyga was the 42nd season of the LFF Lyga football competition in Lithuania. It was contested by 24 teams, and Statyba Panevezys won the championship.

== Group I ==
Pos	Team	Pld	W	D	L	GF	GA	GD	Pts
1	Maistas/Statyba Panevezys	22	17	5	0	66	21	+45	39
2	Statybininkas Siauliai	22	10	5	7	36	30	+6	25
3	Zalgiris N.Vilnia	22	8	8	6	25	24	+1	24
4	Lima Kaunas	22	7	9	6	32	26	+6	23
5	Tauras Taurage	22	6	11	5	40	39	+1	23
6	Atletas Kaunas	22	7	8	7	25	17	+8	22
7	Kauno audiniai	22	9	3	10	42	47	−5	21
8	Metalas Vilkaviskis	22	8	5	9	25	35	−10	21
9	Cementininkas N.Akmene	22	7	6	9	23	22	+1	20
10	Baltija Klaipeda	22	6	7	9	35	43	−8	19
11	Baldininkas Ukmerge	22	6	5	11	33	55	−22	17
12	Nevezis Kedainiai	22	3	4	15	31	54	−23	10

Source: rsssf.com

== Group II ==
Pos	Team	Pld	W	D	L	GF	GA	GD	Pts
1	Poli Kaunas	22	16	5	1	49	12	+37	37
2	Inkaras Kaunas	22	15	6	1	46	16	+30	36
3	Minija Kretinga	22	11	4	7	47	27	+20	26
4	Elfa Vilnius	22	9	5	8	38	38	0	23
5	Granitas Klaipėda	22	9	5	8	30	34	−4	23
6	Linu audiniai Plunge	22	9	3	10	33	34	−1	21
7	Elnias Siauliai	22	8	4	10	33	33	0	20
8	Elektra Mazeikiai	22	8	1	13	31	48	−17	17
9	Mastis Telsiai	22	6	5	11	22	46	−24	17
10	Dainava Alytus	22	7	2	13	28	37	−9	16
11	Suduva Kapsukas	22	6	3	13	20	40	−20	15
12	Ekranas Vilnius	22	5	3	14	28	40	−12	13

Source: rsssf.com

== League standings ==
Pos	Team	Pld	W	D	L	GF	GA	GD	Pts
1	Statyba Panevezys	26	21	5	0	79	26	+53	47
2	Poli Kaunas	26	18	6	2	60	17	+43	42
3	Inkaras Kaunas	26	18	6	2	52	18	+34	42
4	Minija Kretinga	26	12	5	9	54	34	+20	29
5	Lima Kaunas	26	8	11	7	37	31	+6	27
6	Elfa Vilnius	26	10	7	9	48	47	+1	27
7	Statybininkas Siauliai	26	10	6	10	41	47	−6	26
8	Zalgiris N.Vilnia	26	8	9	9	25	31	−6	25

Source: rsssf.com
