= 1967 LFF Lyga =

LFF Lyga
- Season: 1967

The 1967 LFF Lyga was the 46th season of the LFF Lyga football competition in Lithuania. It was contested by 15 teams, and Saliutas Vilnius won the championship.

== League standings ==
Pos	Team	Pld	W	D	L	GF	GA	GD	Pts
1	Saliutas Vilnius	28	17	9	2	43	11	+32	43
2	Inkaras Kaunas	28	16	8	4	33	14	+19	40
3	Nevezis Kedainiai	28	13	11	4	34	12	+22	37
4	Statyba Panevėžys	28	16	4	8	42	19	+23	36
5	Minija Kretinga	28	11	11	6	36	25	+11	33
6	Politechnika Kaunas	28	11	8	9	34	26	+8	30
7	Statybininkas Siauliai	28	9	11	8	35	26	+9	29
8	Zalgiris N. Vilnia	28	7	12	9	28	27	+1	26
9	Atletas Kaunas	28	7	12	9	19	23	−4	26
10	Lima Kaunas	28	10	5	13	26	38	−12	25
11	Linu audiniai Plunge	28	9	4	15	18	39	−21	22
12	Chemikas Klaipėda	28	7	6	15	19	39	−20	20
13	Banga Kaunas	28	5	8	15	17	39	−22	18
14	Baltija Klaipėda	28	7	4	17	16	47	−31	18
15	Elnias Siauliai	28	6	5	17	22	37	−15	17

Source: rsssf.com
