= 1987 LFF Lyga =

LFF Lyga
- Season: 1987

The 1987 LFF Lyga was the 66th season of the LFF Lyga football competition in Lithuania. It was contested by 17 teams, and Tauras Taurage won the championship.

== League standings ==
Pos	Team	Pld	W	D	L	GF	GA	GD	Pts
1	Tauras Taurage	32	23	7	2	48	15	+33	53
2	SRT Vilnius	32	25	3	4	65	18	+47	53
3	Inkaras Kaunas	32	19	8	5	60	27	+33	46
4	Atmosfera Mazeikiai	32	18	8	6	51	28	+23	44
5	Ekranas Panevezys	32	20	3	9	65	36	+29	43
6	Granitas Klaipėda	32	14	9	9	44	32	+12	37
7	Statybininkas Siauliai	32	12	8	12	42	35	+7	32
8	Banga Kaunas	32	12	8	12	45	33	+12	32
9	Nevezis Kedainiai	32	11	9	12	45	51	−6	31
10	Kelininkas Kaunas	32	12	7	13	27	28	−1	31
11	Aidas Kaunas	32	11	4	17	39	54	−15	26
12	Atletas Kaunas	32	8	9	15	25	40	−15	25
13	Poringe Alytus	32	7	10	15	31	56	−25	24
14	Sveikata Kybartai	32	7	8	17	19	47	−28	22
15	Tauras Siauliai	32	5	6	21	29	61	−32	16
16	Ausra Vilnius	32	2	11	19	29	63	−34	15
17	Utenis Utena	32	5	4	23	27	67	−40	14

Source: rsssf.com

=== Playoff ===
- Tauras Taurage 2-2 (3-2) SRT Vilnius
