= 1957 LFF Lyga =

LFF Lyga
- Season: 1957

The 1957 LFF Lyga was the 36th season of the LFF Lyga football competition in Lithuania. It was contested by 14 teams, and Elnias Šiauliai won the championship.

== League standings ==
| Pos | Team | Pld | W | D | L | GF | GA | GD | Pts |
|---|---|---|---|---|---|---|---|---|---|
| 1 | Elnias Šiauliai | 26 | 20 | 5 | 1 | 73 | 11 | +62 | 45 |
| 2 | Inkaras Kaunas | 26 | 18 | 5 | 3 | 59 | 26 | +33 | 41 |
| 3 | Linų Audiniai Plungė | 26 | 13 | 8 | 5 | 37 | 30 | +7 | 34 |
| 4 | Elfa Vilnius | 26 | 14 | 4 | 8 | 59 | 25 | +34 | 32 |
| 5 | MSK Panevėžys | 26 | 11 | 8 | 7 | 60 | 48 | +12 | 30 |
| 6 | Spartakas Vilnius | 26 | 13 | 4 | 9 | 52 | 41 | +11 | 30 |
| 7 | Raudonasis Spalis Kaunas | 26 | 14 | 1 | 11 | 62 | 45 | +17 | 29 |
| 8 | Lima Kaunas | 26 | 11 | 6 | 9 | 40 | 33 | +7 | 28 |
| 9 | KPI Kaunas | 26 | 12 | 3 | 11 | 37 | 37 | 0 | 27 |
| 10 | Raudonoji Žvaigždė Vilnius | 26 | 8 | 5 | 13 | 27 | 32 | −5 | 21 |
| 11 | Spartakas Kaunas | 26 | 5 | 3 | 18 | 15 | 55 | −40 | 13 |
| 12 | Švyturys Klaipėda | 26 | 5 | 2 | 19 | 28 | 67 | −39 | 12 |
| 13 | RPK Vilkaviškis | 26 | 3 | 6 | 17 | 24 | 60 | −36 | 12 |
| 14 | Spartakas Vilnius Youth | 26 | 4 | 2 | 20 | 25 | 88 | −63 | 10 |

Source: rsssf.com
