= 1945 LFF Lyga =

LFF Lyga
- Season: 1945

The 1945 LFF Lyga was the 24th season of the LFF Lyga football competition in Lithuania. Spartakas Kaunas won the championship.

== Kaunas Group ==
| Pos | Team | Pld | W | D | L | GF | GA | GD | Pts |
|---|---|---|---|---|---|---|---|---|---|
| 1 | Dinamo Kaunas | 3 | 3 | 0 | 0 | 11 | 2 | +9 | 6 |
| 2 | Spartakas Kaunas | 3 | 2 | 0 | 1 | 24 | 6 | +18 | 4 |
| 3 | Kovas Kaunas | 3 | 1 | 0 | 2 | 6 | 11 | −5 | 2 |
| 4 | Žalgiris Kaunas | 3 | 0 | 0 | 3 | 1 | 23 | −22 | 0 |

Source: rsssf.com

== Vilnius Group ==
| Pos | Team | Pld | W | D | L | GF | GA | GD | Pts |
|---|---|---|---|---|---|---|---|---|---|
| 1 | Dinamo Vilnius | 2 | 2 | 0 | 0 | 12 | 1 | +11 | 4 |
| 2 | Spartakas Vilnius | 2 | 1 | 0 | 1 | 4 | 3 | +1 | 2 |
| 3 | KN Vilnius | 2 | 0 | 0 | 2 | 1 | 13 | −12 | 0 |

Source: rsssf.com

== Šiauliai Group ==
- Spartakas Šiauliai 8-4 Žalgiris Šiauliai

== Suduva Group ==
- Žalgiris Marijampolė 3-3; 8-0 Sveikata Kybartai

== Quarterfinal ==
- Sodyba Klaipėda 1-0 Tauras Tauragė
- Spartakas Kaunas 8-2 Žalgiris Marijampolė
- Spartakas Šiauliai 12-1 Džiugas Telšiai
- Dinamo Vilnius 15-0 MSK Panevėžys

== Semifinal ==
- Spartakas Kaunas 3-1 Sodyba Klaipėda
- Dinamo Vilnius 6-0 Spartakas Šiauliai

== Final ==
- Spartakas Kaunas 4-0 Dinamo Vilnius
