= 1982 LFF Lyga =

LFF Lyga
- Season: 1982

The 1982 LFF Lyga was the 61st season of the LFF Lyga football competition in Lithuania. It was contested by 16 teams, and Pazanga Vilnius won the championship.

== League standings ==
Pos	Team	Pld	W	D	L	GF	GA	GD	Pts
1	Pazanga Vilnius	29	18	10	1	54	20	+34	46
2	Granitas Klaipėda	29	17	8	4	45	23	+22	42
3	Tauras Siauliai	29	16	8	5	41	22	+19	40
4	Kelininkas Kaunas	29	14	11	4	47	19	+28	39
5	Ekranas Panevezys	29	11	11	7	40	24	+16	33
6	Atmosfera Mazeikiai	29	11	11	7	23	17	+6	33
7	Ausra Vilnius	29	11	8	10	34	33	+1	30
8	Statybininkas Siauliai	29	9	10	10	23	22	+1	28
9	Banga Kaunas	29	11	5	13	35	35	0	27
10	Vienybe Ukmerge	29	9	8	12	38	38	0	26
11	Statyba Jonava	29	7	11	11	35	36	−1	25
12	Inkaras Kaunas	29	4	13	12	18	34	−16	21
13	Atletas Kaunas	29	5	10	14	18	32	−14	20
14	Politechnika Kaunas	29	6	8	15	29	46	−17	20
15	Sirvinta Vilkaviskis	29	4	3	22	20	72	−52	11
16	Jaunimo rinktine	15	2	3	10	5	32	−27	7

Source: rsssf.com
