= 1948 LFF Lyga =

LFF Lyga
- Season: 1948

The 1948 LFF Lyga was the 27th season of the LFF Lyga football competition in Lithuania. It was contested by 19 teams, and Elnias Šiauliai won the championship.

== North ==
Pos	Team	Pld	W	D	L	GF	GA	GD	Pts
1	Audra Klaipėda	8	6	0	2	28	13	+15	12
2	Žalgiris Šiauliai	8	5	1	2	17	13	+4	11
3	Žalgiris Tauragė	8	5	0	3	28	17	+11	10
4	ASK Kaunas	8	4	1	3	22	21	+1	9
5	Vėliava Šiauliai	8	4	0	4	24	11	+13	8
6	Spartakas Plungė	8	3	1	4	18	26	−8	7
7	Žalgiris Panevėžys	8	3	1	4	9	15	−6	7
8	Spartakas Šiauliai	8	3	0	5	16	24	−8	6
9	GSK Klaipėda	8	1	0	7	15	37	−22	2

Source: rsssf.com

== South ==
Pos	Team	Pld	W	D	L	GF	GA	GD	Pts
1	Spartakas Vilnius	9	7	0	2	28	14	+14	14
2	Elnias Šiauliai	9	6	1	2	28	13	+15	13
3	Dinamo Vilnius	9	5	1	3	22	13	+9	11
4	Audiniai Kaunas	9	5	1	3	24	15	+9	11
5	Spartakas Kaunas	9	3	3	3	15	18	−3	9
6	Inkaras Kaunas	9	4	1	4	16	22	−6	9
7	KKI Kaunas	9	4	1	4	10	16	−6	9
8	Lokomotyvas Kaunas	9	1	3	5	11	22	−11	5
9	Žalgiris Ukmergė	9	1	3	5	11	25	−14	5
10	Žalgiris Marijampolė	9	1	2	6	15	22	−7	4

Source: rsssf.com

== Final ==
Pos	Team	Pld	W	D	L	GF	GA	GD	Pts
1	Elnias Šiauliai	5	4	0	1	22	11	+11	8
2	Žalgiris Tauragė	5	3	1	1	14	10	+4	7
3	Spartakas Vilnius	5	2	1	2	15	11	+4	5
4	Dinamo Vilnius	5	1	3	1	10	10	0	5
5	Audra Klaipėda	5	1	1	3	5	7	−2	3
6	Žalgiris Šiauliai	5	0	2	3	7	24	−17	2
7	Inkaras Kaunas	5	5	0	0	21	11	+10	10
8	Audiniai Kaunas	5	4	0	1	9	3	+6	8
9	Spartakas Plungė	5	3	0	2	10	8	+2	6
10	Spartakas Kaunas	5	2	0	3	3	9	−6	4
11	Vėliava Šiauliai	5	1	0	4	7	13	−6	2
12	ASK Kaunas	5	0	0	5	5	11	−6	0
13	Lokomotyvas Kaunas	6	5	0	1	11	1	+10	10
14	Žalgiris Ukmergė	6	5	0	1	8	9	−1	10
15	Spartakas Šiauliai	6	3	1	2	0	0	0	7
16	Žalgiris Marijampolė	6	3	1	2	2	5	−3	7
17	GSK Klaipėda	6	2	0	4	3	9	−6	4
18	KKI Kaunas	6	1	0	5	0	0	0	2
19	Žalgiris Panevėžys	6	1	0	5	0	0	0	2

Source: rsssf.com
