= 1942–43 LFF Lyga =

LFF Lyga
- Season: 1942–43

The 1942–43 LFF Lyga was the 22nd season of the LFF Lyga football competition in Lithuania. Tauras Kaunas won the championship.

== Kaunas Group ==
| Pos | Team | Pld | W | D | L | GF | GA | GD | Pts |
|---|---|---|---|---|---|---|---|---|---|
| 1 | Tauras Kaunas | 8 | 5 | 2 | 1 | 24 | 10 | +14 | 12 |
| 2 | Perkūnas Kaunas | 8 | 3 | 4 | 1 | 29 | 18 | +11 | 10 |
| 3 | Kovas Kaunas | 8 | 3 | 2 | 3 | 14 | 21 | −7 | 8 |
| 4 | LGSF Kaunas | 8 | 3 | 0 | 5 | 16 | 24 | −8 | 6 |
| 5 | LFLS Kaunas | 8 | 1 | 2 | 5 | 11 | 21 | −10 | 4 |

Source: rsssf.com

== Vilnius Group ==
| Pos | Team | Pld | W | D | L | GF | GA | GD | Pts |
|---|---|---|---|---|---|---|---|---|---|
| 1 | LGSF Vilnius | 4 | 4 | 0 | 0 | 12 | 1 | +11 | 8 |
| 2 | LFLS Vilnius | 4 | 1 | 0 | 3 | 11 | 11 | 0 | 2 |
| 3 | Šarūnas Vilnius | 4 | 1 | 0 | 3 | 7 | 18 | −11 | 2 |

Source: rsssf.com

== Šiauliai Group ==
| Pos | Team | Pld | W | D | L | GF | GA | GD | Pts |
|---|---|---|---|---|---|---|---|---|---|
| 1 | Gubernija Šiauliai | 11 | 10 | 0 | 1 | 46 | 14 | +32 | 20 |
| 2 | Sakalas Šiauliai | 11 | 7 | 2 | 2 | 31 | 18 | +13 | 16 |
| 3 | Wermachtfeld | 11 | 5 | 3 | 3 | 22 | 22 | 0 | 13 |
| 4 | Žaibas Kuršėnai | 11 | 5 | 0 | 6 | 34 | 23 | +11 | 10 |
| 5 | Žaibas Joniškis | 7 | 4 | 1 | 2 | 24 | 12 | +12 | 9 |
| 6 | Šarūnas Šiauliai | 11 | 2 | 1 | 8 | 15 | 31 | −16 | 5 |
| 7 | Metalas Šiauliai | 6 | 0 | 1 | 5 | 3 | 36 | −33 | 1 |
| 8 | Tauras Tauragė | 6 | 0 | 0 | 6 | 6 | 25 | −19 | 0 |

Source: rsssf.com

== Panevėžys Group ==
| Pos | Team | Pld | W | D | L | GF | GA | GD | Pts |
|---|---|---|---|---|---|---|---|---|---|
| 1 | MSK Panevėžys | 7 | 7 | 0 | 0 | 57 | 2 | +55 | 14 |
| 2 | LGSF Panevėžys | 4 | 3 | 0 | 1 | 9 | 8 | +1 | 6 |
| 3 | Grandis Rokiškis | 7 | 2 | 0 | 5 | 12 | 25 | −13 | 4 |
| 4 | Vilkas Biržai | 7 | 2 | 0 | 5 | 6 | 22 | −16 | 4 |
| 5 | Sakalas Obeliai | 7 | 2 | 0 | 5 | 11 | 38 | −27 | 4 |

Source: rsssf.com

== Sūduva Group ==
- Sveikata Kybartai 3-0 Dainava Alytus

== Jonava Group ==
- LFLS Jonava

== Žemaitija Group ==
- Džiugas Telšiai

== Quarterfinal ==
- Gubernija Šiauliai 3-0 Džiugas Telšiai
- LGSF Vilnius 3-1 LFLS Jonava
- Tauras Kaunas 5-0 Sveikata Kybartai

== Semifinal ==
- MSK Panevėžys 2-1 LGSF Vilnius
- Tauras Kaunas 5-1 Gubernija Šiauliai

== Final ==
- Tauras Kaunas 4-1 MSK Panevėžys
