= 1965 LFF Lyga =

LFF Lyga
- Season: 1965

The 1965 LFF Lyga was the 44th season of the LFF Lyga football competition in Lithuania. It was contested by 16 teams, and Inkaras Kaunas won the championship.

== League standings ==
Pos	Team	Pld	W	D	L	GF	GA	GD	Pts
1	Inkaras Kaunas	30	18	10	2	73	26	+47	46
2	Saliutas Vilnius	30	17	9	4	68	18	+50	43
3	Statyba Panevėžys	30	17	4	9	63	36	+27	38
4	Nevezis Kedainiai	30	15	6	9	55	35	+20	36
5	Statybininkas Siauliai	30	12	9	9	43	31	+12	33
6	Elnias Siauliai	30	11	11	8	43	36	+7	33
7	Baltija Klaipeda	30	12	9	9	46	43	+3	33
8	Lima Kaunas	30	12	9	9	33	36	−3	33
9	Elektra Mazeikiai	30	14	3	13	49	53	−4	31
10	Minija Kretinga	30	13	4	13	50	45	+5	30
11	Poli Kaunas	30	10	5	15	55	46	+9	25
12	Linu audiniai Plunge	30	7	10	13	43	60	−17	24
13	Elfa Vilnius	30	10	2	18	37	72	−35	22
14	Tauras Taurage	30	8	5	17	33	58	−25	21
15	Alytis Alytus	30	5	6	19	32	74	−42	16
16	Atletas Kaunas	30	5	6	19	25	79	−54	16

Source: rsssf.com
