= 1955 LFF Lyga =

LFF Lyga
- Season: 1955

The 1955 LFF Lyga was the 34th season of the LFF Lyga football competition in Lithuania. It was contested by 12 teams, and Lima Kaunas won the championship.

== League standings ==
Pos	Team	Pld	W	D	L	GF	GA	GD	Pts
1	Lima Kaunas	20	11	7	2	38	16	+22	29
2	Raudonasis Spalis Kaunas	20	14	1	5	49	23	+26	29
3	Elfa Vilnius	20	12	4	4	35	26	+9	28
4	Inkaras Kaunas	20	9	6	5	39	31	+8	24
5	KPI Kaunas	20	10	4	6	33	30	+3	24
6	Spartakas Vilnius	20	11	1	8	50	38	+12	23
7	MSK Panevėžys	20	8	4	8	44	38	+6	20
8	Elnias Šiauliai	20	5	5	10	34	44	−10	15
9	Trinyčiai Klaipėda	20	5	3	12	29	25	+4	13
10	Gubernija Šiauliai	20	4	2	14	20	62	−42	10
11	JJPF Kaunas	20	2	1	17	18	56	−38	5

Source: rsssf.com

=== Playoff ===
- Lima Kaunas 3-0 Raudonasis Spalis Kaunas
