= 1988 LFF Lyga =

LFF Lyga
- Season: 1988

The 1988 LFF Lyga was the 67th season of the LFF Lyga football competition in Lithuania. It was contested by 16 teams, and SRT Vilnius won the championship.

== League standings ==
Pos	Team	Pld	W	D	L	GF	GA	GD	Pts
1	SRT Vilnius	30	18	11	1	70	26	+44	47
2	Inkaras Kaunas	30	16	13	1	47	20	+27	45
3	Ekranas Panevezys	30	17	8	5	52	20	+32	42
4	Kelininkas Kaunas	30	14	9	7	46	31	+15	37
5	Atmosfera Mazeikiai	30	16	5	9	49	31	+18	37
6	Banga Kaunas	30	12	12	6	39	22	+17	36
7	Tauras Taurage	30	14	7	9	48	37	+11	35
8	Granitas Klaipėda	30	12	8	10	65	34	+31	32
9	Statybininkas Siauliai	30	11	8	11	32	31	+1	30
10	Vienybe Ukmerge	30	12	5	13	38	49	−11	29
11	Poringe Alytus	30	8	12	10	41	48	−7	28
12	Suduva Marijampole	30	6	10	14	39	43	−4	22
13	Atletas Kaunas	30	7	8	15	34	43	−9	22
14	Statyba Jonava	30	7	4	19	31	62	−31	18
15	Nevezis Kedainiai	30	5	7	18	37	59	−22	17
16	Automobilistas Klaipeda	30	1	1	28	17	129	−112	3

Source: rsssf.com
