= 1984 LFF Lyga =

LFF Lyga
- Season: 1984

The 1984 LFF Lyga was the 63rd season of the LFF Lyga football competition in Lithuania. It was contested by 18 teams, and Granitas Klaipėda won the championship.

== League standings ==
Pos	Team	Pld	W	D	L	GF	GA	GD	Pts
1	Granitas Klaipėda	34	23	7	4	76	26	+50	53
2	Ekranas Panevezys	34	20	8	6	54	34	+20	48
3	SRT Vilnius	34	17	12	5	56	33	+23	46
4	Pazanga Vilnius	34	18	9	7	46	29	+17	45
5	Banga Kaunas	34	14	12	8	45	29	+16	40
6	Statyba Jonava	34	15	10	9	42	48	−6	40
7	Utenis Utena	34	15	4	15	40	41	−1	34
8	Statybininkas Siauliai	34	12	10	12	42	44	−2	34
9	Tauras Siauliai	34	12	9	13	47	46	+1	33
10	Atmosfera Mazeikiai	34	9	15	10	27	31	−4	33
11	Vienybe Ukmerge	34	12	9	13	46	41	+5	33
12	Kelininkas Kaunas	34	10	11	13	44	46	−2	31
13	Inkaras Kaunas	34	7	17	10	28	34	−6	31
14	Atletas Kaunas	34	9	9	16	26	44	−18	27
15	Nevezis Kedainiai	34	6	11	17	42	57	−15	23
16	Moksleiviu rinktine	34	6	10	18	26	49	−23	22
17	Politechnika Kaunas	34	5	10	19	14	36	−22	20
18	Zalgirietis Vilnius	34	3	13	18	18	51	−33	19

Source: rsssf.com
