= 1983 LFF Lyga =

LFF Lyga
- Season: 1983

The 1983 LFF Lyga was the 62nd season of the LFF Lyga football competition in Lithuania. It was contested by 16 teams, and Pazanga Vilnius won the championship.

== League standings ==
Pos	Team	Pld	W	D	L	GF	GA	GD	Pts
1	Pazanga Vilnius	30	18	8	4	54	28	+26	44
2	Granitas Klaipėda	30	18	5	7	51	30	+21	41
3	Tauras Siauliai	30	15	10	5	51	32	+19	40
4	Atmosfera Mazeikiai	30	14	12	4	39	30	+9	40
5	Banga Kaunas	30	14	10	6	50	33	+17	38
6	Kelininkas Kaunas	30	13	10	7	32	27	+5	36
7	Nevezis Kedainiai	30	14	7	9	34	40	−6	35
8	Ekranas Panevezys	30	10	9	11	38	32	+6	29
9	Statyba Jonava	30	10	9	11	39	30	+9	29
10	Atletas Kaunas	30	10	7	13	29	34	−5	27
11	Politechnika Kaunas	30	8	11	11	25	34	−9	27
12	Vienybe Ukmerge	30	7	12	11	30	35	−5	26
13	Statybininkas Siauliai	30	10	5	15	28	37	−9	25
14	Inkaras Kaunas	30	9	5	16	32	41	−9	23
15	Mokslas Vilnius	30	3	10	17	16	43	−27	16
16	Ausra Vilnius	30	0	4	26	26	68	−42	4

Source: rsssf.com
