= 1951 LFF Lyga =

LFF Lyga
- Season: 1951

The 1951 LFF Lyga was the 30th season of the LFF Lyga football competition in Lithuania. It was contested by 12 teams, and Inkaras Kaunas won the championship.

== League standings ==
Pos	Team	Pld	W	D	L	GF	GA	GD	Pts
1	Inkaras Kaunas	21	19	1	1	90	13	+77	39
2	Elnias Šiauliai	21	13	3	5	51	20	+31	29
3	Kauno audiniai	21	13	2	6	55	29	+26	28
4	Lituanika Kaunas	21	12	3	6	61	35	+26	27
5	Dinamo Vilnius	21	10	2	9	68	33	+35	22
6	Audra Klaipėda	21	10	1	10	36	34	+2	21
7	ASK Kaunas	21	8	5	8	32	36	−4	21
8	Saliutas Vilnius	11	6	4	1	36	17	+19	16
9	Žalgiris Panevėžys	21	4	5	12	28	64	−36	13
10	Žalgiris Kybartai	21	4	3	14	30	59	−29	11
11	Dinamo Utena	21	3	2	16	22	94	−72	8
12	Žalgiris Ukmergė	21	3	1	17	20	95	−75	7

Source: rsssf.com
