= 1964 LFF Lyga =

LFF Lyga
- Season: 1964

The 1964 LFF Lyga was the 43rd season of the LFF Lyga football competition in Lithuania. It was contested by 16 teams, and Inkaras Kaunas won the championship.

== League standings ==
Pos	Team	Pld	W	D	L	GF	GA	GD	Pts
1	Inkaras Kaunas	30	24	2	4	72	18	+54	50
2	Statyba Panevėžys	30	16	8	6	61	32	+29	40
3	Minija Kretinga	30	15	8	7	59	40	+19	38
4	Lima Kaunas	30	15	8	7	50	38	+12	38
5	Elfa Vilnius	30	16	4	10	49	38	+11	36
6	Elnias Siauliai	30	15	6	9	47	41	+6	36
7	Atletas Kaunas	30	12	8	10	33	39	−6	32
8	Statybininkas Siauliai	30	11	8	11	43	36	+7	30
9	Elektra Mazeikiai	30	13	4	13	42	39	+3	30
10	Linu audiniai Plunge	30	10	7	13	44	57	−13	27
11	Poli Kaunas	30	9	8	13	39	51	−12	26
12	Kauno audiniai	30	10	5	15	35	44	−9	25
13	Tauras Taurage	30	8	6	16	39	55	−16	22
14	Metalas Vilkaviskis	30	6	7	17	25	40	−15	19
15	Zalgiris N.Vilnia	30	6	7	17	20	48	−28	19
16	Granitas Klaipėda	30	4	4	22	19	61	−42	12

Source: rsssf.com
