= 1939–40 LFF Lyga =

LFF Lyga
- Season: 1939–40
- Champions: none (abandoned)

The 1939–40 LFF Lyga was the 19th season of the LFF Lyga football competition in Lithuania. It was abandoned.

== Autumn ==
| Pos | Team | Pld | W | D | L | GF | GA | GD | Pts |
|---|---|---|---|---|---|---|---|---|---|
| 1 | LGSF Kaunas | 7 | 5 | 2 | 0 | 22 | 4 | +18 | 12 |
| 2 | Tauras Kaunas | 7 | 4 | 1 | 2 | 16 | 10 | +6 | 9 |
| 3 | LFLS Kaunas | 6 | 4 | 0 | 2 | 19 | 11 | +8 | 8 |
| 4 | CJSO Kaunas | 7 | 4 | 0 | 3 | 11 | 7 | +4 | 8 |
| 5 | MSK Kaunas | 7 | 3 | 1 | 3 | 8 | 10 | −2 | 7 |
| 6 | KSS Telsiai | 6 | 2 | 1 | 3 | 3 | 10 | −7 | 5 |
| 7 | Sakalas Šiauliai | 7 | 2 | 0 | 5 | 6 | 17 | −11 | 4 |
| 8 | Kovas Kaunas | 7 | 0 | 1 | 6 | 8 | 24 | −16 | 1 |

Source: rsssf.com

== Spring ==
=== Kaunas Group ===
| Pos | Team | Pld | W | D | L | GF | GA | GD | Pts |
|---|---|---|---|---|---|---|---|---|---|
| 1 | LGSF Kaunas | 8 | 5 | 3 | 0 | 20 | 3 | +17 | 13 |
| 2 | Tauras Kaunas | 8 | 4 | 3 | 1 | 22 | 13 | +9 | 11 |
| 3 | LFLS Kaunas | 8 | 3 | 2 | 3 | 25 | 17 | +8 | 8 |
| 4 | MSK Kaunas | 8 | 2 | 1 | 5 | 10 | 24 | −14 | 5 |
| 5 | Kovas Kaunas | 8 | 1 | 1 | 6 | 12 | 32 | −20 | 3 |

Source: rsssf.com

=== Žemaitija Group ===
| Pos | Team | Pld | W | D | L | GF | GA | GD | Pts |
|---|---|---|---|---|---|---|---|---|---|
| 1 | Sakalas Šiauliai | 4 | 4 | 0 | 0 | 13 | 3 | +10 | 8 |
| 2 | KSS Telšiai | 4 | 3 | 0 | 1 | 22 | 4 | +18 | 6 |
| 3 | Žinia Šiauliai | 4 | 1 | 1 | 2 | 7 | 7 | 0 | 3 |
| 4 | Makabi Šiauliai | 4 | 1 | 1 | 2 | 5 | 18 | −13 | 3 |
| 5 | Džiugas Telšiai | 4 | 0 | 0 | 4 | 1 | 16 | −15 | 0 |

Source: rsssf.com
