= 1953 LFF Lyga =

LFF Lyga
- Season: 1953

The 1953 LFF Lyga was the 32nd season of the LFF Lyga football competition in Lithuania. It was contested by 13 teams, and Elnias Šiauliai won the championship.

== League standings ==
Pos	Team	Pld	W	D	L	GF	GA	GD	Pts
1	Elnias Šiauliai	21	15	4	2	45	20	+25	34
2	Inkaras Kaunas	21	14	4	3	58	15	+43	32
3	Lima Kaunas	21	12	3	6	41	26	+15	27
4	KPI Kaunas	21	9	6	6	32	25	+7	24
5	JJPF Kaunas	21	9	4	8	24	30	−6	22
6	Lituanika Kaunas	21	8	4	9	40	43	−3	20
7	Dinamo Vilnius	21	8	3	10	26	33	−7	19
8	Trinyčiai Klaipėda	21	8	2	11	34	47	−13	18
9	Spartakas Plungė	21	6	4	11	27	38	−11	16
10	Gubernija Šiauliai	21	5	3	13	14	33	−19	13
11	Elfa Vilnius	11	5	2	4	16	13	+3	12
12	Audiniai Kaunas	21	2	1	18	11	45	−34	5
13	KN Vilnius	11	5	2	4	23	8	+15	12

Source: rsssf.com
