= 1954 LFF Lyga =

LFF Lyga
- Season: 1954

The 1954 LFF Lyga was the 33rd season of the LFF Lyga football competition in Lithuania. It was contested by 12 teams, and Inkaras Kaunas won the championship.

== League standings ==
Pos	Team	Pld	W	D	L	GF	GA	GD	Pts
1	Inkaras Kaunas	19	17	1	1	44	18	+26	35
2	Lima Kaunas	19	12	1	6	27	26	+1	25
3	Elnias Šiauliai	19	11	1	7	57	28	+29	23
4	Raudonasis Spalis Kaunas	20	10	3	7	35	33	+2	23
5	KPI Kaunas	19	8	6	5	32	26	+6	22
6	Spartakas Vilnius	19	7	4	8	39	32	+7	18
7	JJPF Kaunas	19	5	4	10	28	38	−10	14
8	Trinyčiai Klaipėda	19	5	2	12	26	41	−15	12
9	Elfa Vilnius	19	4	4	11	24	46	−22	12
10	KN Vilnius	11	4	3	4	13	11	+2	11
11	Gubernija Šiauliai	19	2	3	14	18	44	−26	7
12	Dinamo Vilnius	0	–	–	–	–	–	—	0

Source: rsssf.com
