= 1980 LFF Lyga =

LFF Lyga
- Season: 1980

The 1980 LFF Lyga was the 59th season of the LFF Lyga football competition in Lithuania. It was contested by 18 teams, and Granitas Klaipeda won the championship.

== League standings ==
| Pos | Team | Pld | W | D | L | GF | GA | GD | Pts |
|---|---|---|---|---|---|---|---|---|---|
| 1 | Granitas Klaipeda | 34 | 20 | 10 | 4 | 67 | 31 | +36 | 50 |
| 2 | Tauras Siauliai | 34 | 19 | 10 | 5 | 48 | 21 | +27 | 48 |
| 3 | Politechnika Kaunas | 34 | 18 | 10 | 6 | 36 | 21 | +15 | 46 |
| 4 | Atmosfera Mazeikiai | 34 | 16 | 11 | 7 | 39 | 24 | +15 | 43 |
| 5 | Kelininkas Kaunas | 34 | 14 | 12 | 8 | 49 | 36 | +13 | 40 |
| 6 | Statybininkas Siauliai | 34 | 12 | 14 | 8 | 41 | 28 | +13 | 38 |
| 7 | Pazanga Vilnius | 34 | 14 | 7 | 13 | 39 | 31 | +8 | 35 |
| 8 | Nevezis Kedainiai | 34 | 11 | 10 | 13 | 42 | 44 | −2 | 32 |
| 9 | Utenis Utena | 34 | 11 | 9 | 14 | 39 | 35 | +4 | 31 |
| 10 | Jaunimas Vilnius | 34 | 9 | 13 | 12 | 40 | 42 | −2 | 31 |
| 11 | Statyba Jonava | 34 | 12 | 7 | 15 | 44 | 48 | −4 | 31 |
| 12 | Ekranas Panevezys | 34 | 12 | 7 | 15 | 36 | 43 | −7 | 31 |
| 13 | Dainava Alytus | 34 | 9 | 12 | 13 | 37 | 46 | −9 | 30 |
| 14 | Vienybe Ukmerge | 34 | 7 | 13 | 14 | 38 | 52 | −14 | 27 |
| 15 | Atletas Kaunas | 34 | 7 | 12 | 15 | 32 | 44 | −12 | 26 |
| 16 | Banga Kaunas | 34 | 7 | 12 | 15 | 31 | 49 | −18 | 26 |
| 17 | Ausra Vilnius | 34 | 10 | 5 | 19 | 28 | 53 | −25 | 25 |
| 18 | Suduva Kapsukas | 34 | 7 | 8 | 19 | 34 | 72 | −38 | 22 |

Source: rsssf.com
