= 1952 LFF Lyga =

LFF Lyga
- Season: 1952

The 1952 LFF Lyga was the 31st season of the LFF Lyga football competition in Lithuania. It was contested by 12 teams, and KN Vilnius won the championship.

== League standings ==
Pos	Team	Pld	W	D	L	GF	GA	GD	Pts
1	KN Vilnius	22	15	5	2	54	14	+40	35
2	Inkaras Kaunas	22	16	1	5	66	27	+39	33
3	Elnias Šiauliai	22	13	3	6	50	26	+24	29
4	Lima Kaunas	22	12	3	7	48	27	+21	27
5	Lituanika Kaunas	22	10	6	6	35	40	−5	26
6	Dinamo Vilnius	22	8	7	7	31	20	+11	23
7	Audiniai Kaunas	22	8	5	9	32	33	−1	21
8	Gubernija Šiauliai	22	7	6	9	28	50	−22	20
9	KPI Kaunas	22	8	3	11	21	34	−13	19
10	Trinyčiai Klaipeda	22	4	8	10	34	36	−2	16
11	Žalgiris Panevėžys	22	3	3	16	29	65	−36	9
12	GSK Kybartai	22	1	4	17	21	77	−56	6

Source: rsssf.com
