= 1989 LFF Lyga =

LFF Lyga
- Season: 1989

The 1989 LFF Lyga was the 68th season of the LFF Lyga football competition in Lithuania. It was contested by 16 teams, and Banga Kaunas won the championship.

== League standings ==
Pos	Team	Pld	W	D	L	GF	GA	GD	Pts	Qualification
1	Banga Kaunas	29	17	9	3	48	16	+32	43	Promotion to Baltic Championship
2	Ekranas Panevezys	29	17	8	4	51	19	+32	42	Promotion to Baltic Championship
3	Sirijus Klaipeda	29	16	7	6	36	21	+15	39	Promotion to Baltic Championship
4	Granitas Klaipėda	29	14	7	8	54	32	+22	35	
5	Tauras Taurage	29	13	9	7	40	26	+14	35	
6	Atmosfera Mazeikiai	29	14	6	9	36	28	+8	34	Promotion to Baltic Championship
7	Gel. Vilkas Vilnius	29	13	8	8	29	24	+5	34	
8	Kelininkas Kaunas	29	12	7	10	43	35	+8	31	
9	Atletas Kaunas	29	11	7	11	34	38	−4	29	
10	Statybininkas Siauliai	29	10	3	16	26	41	−15	23	Promotion to Baltic Championship
11	Vienybe Ukmerge	29	9	4	16	34	37	−3	22	
12	Poringe Alytus	29	7	7	15	27	77	−50	21	
13	Neris Vilnius	29	6	8	15	30	44	−14	20	Promotion to Baltic Championship
14	Suduva Marijampole	29	6	4	19	26	43	−17	16	Promotion to Baltic Championship
15	Lithuania j.r.	15	6	3	6	16	17	−1	15	
16	Statyba Jonava	29	3	5	21	22	54	−32	11	

Source: rsssf.com
