= 1949 LFF Lyga =

LFF Lyga
- Season: 1949

The 1949 LFF Lyga was the 28th season of the LFF Lyga football competition in Lithuania. It was contested by 15 teams, and Elnias Šiauliai won the championship.

== League standings ==
Pos	Team	Pld	W	D	L	GF	GA	GD	Pts
1	Elnias Šiauliai	14	12	0	2	59	19	+40	24
2	Inkaras Kaunas	14	12	0	2	78	9	+69	24
3	Vėliava Šiauliai	14	11	1	2	40	24	+16	23
4	Audiniai Kaunas	14	10	1	3	53	28	+25	21
5	Audra Klaipėda	14	10	1	3	40	15	+25	21
6	ASK Kaunas	14	7	0	7	43	36	+7	14
7	Žalgiris Marijampolė	14	6	1	7	16	23	−7	13
8	Spartakas Plungė	14	6	1	7	22	45	−23	13
9	Spartakas Vilnius	14	5	2	7	30	37	−7	12
10	Dinamo Vilnius	14	6	0	8	26	39	−13	12
11	Žalgiris Kybartai	14	6	0	8	27	41	−14	12
12	Spartakas Kaunas	14	3	2	9	18	36	−18	8
13	Žalgiris Tauragė	14	3	0	11	28	67	−39	6
14	Žalgiris Ukmergė	14	2	1	11	14	45	−31	5
15	Žalgiris Panevėžys	14	1	0	13	17	47	−30	2

Source: rsssf.com

=== Playoff ===
- Elnias Šiauliai 1-0 Inkaras Kaunas

== Bibliography ==
- RSSSF
