= 1978 LFF Lyga =

LFF Lyga
- Season: 1978

The 1978 LFF Lyga was the 57th season of the LFF Lyga football competition in Lithuania. It was contested by 16 teams, and Granitas Klaipėda won the championship.

== League standings ==
Pos	Team	Pld	W	D	L	GF	GA	GD	Pts
1	Granitas Klaipėda	30	15	12	3	45	19	+26	42
2	Statybininkas Siauliai	30	14	11	5	31	16	+15	39
3	Banga Kaunas	30	15	8	7	43	26	+17	38
4	Kelininkas Kaunas	30	14	9	7	41	19	+22	37
5	Atmosfera Mazeikiai	30	13	9	8	33	21	+12	35
6	Tauras Siauliai	30	13	6	11	30	28	+2	32
7	Sviesa Vilnius	30	8	14	8	27	25	+2	30
8	Politechnika Kaunas	30	9	11	10	32	32	0	29
9	Pazanga Vilnius	30	8	12	10	30	31	−1	28
10	Dainava Alytus	30	10	8	12	33	39	−6	28
11	Kooperatininkas Plunge	30	11	5	14	32	44	−12	27
12	Nevezis Kedainiai	30	7	12	11	32	36	−4	26
13	Ekranas Panevezys	30	7	10	13	33	41	−8	24
14	Vienybe Ukmerge	30	9	6	15	33	47	−14	24
15	Atletas Kaunas	30	8	7	15	33	51	−18	23
16	Suduva Kapsukas	30	4	10	16	18	51	−33	18

Source: rsssf.com
