= 1958 LFF Lyga =

LFF Lyga
- Season: 1958

The 1958 LFF Lyga was the 37th season of the LFF Lyga football competition in Lithuania. It was contested by 12 teams, and Elnias Šiauliai won the championship.

== League standings ==
Pos	Team	Pld	W	D	L	GF	GA	GD	Pts
1	Elnias Šiauliai	11	8	1	2	22	11	+11	17
2	Raudonoji Žvaigždė Vilnius	11	6	4	1	18	7	+11	16
3	Spartakas Vilnius	11	7	2	2	25	18	+7	16
4	Inkaras Kaunas	11	4	4	3	19	9	+10	12
5	MSK Panevėžys	11	5	2	4	21	18	+3	12
6	Raudonasis Spalis Kaunas	11	6	0	5	22	20	+2	12
7	Linų Audiniai Plungė	11	4	3	4	12	15	−3	11
8	KPI Kaunas	11	3	4	4	20	10	+10	10
9	Baltija Klaipėda	11	4	1	6	16	25	−9	9
10	Lima Kaunas	11	2	4	5	7	19	−12	8
11	CF Kapsukas	11	3	1	7	14	26	−12	7
12	Elfa Vilnius	11	0	2	9	6	24	−18	2

Source: rsssf.com
