= 1950 LFF Lyga =

LFF Lyga
- Season: 1950

The 1950 LFF Lyga was the 29th season of the LFF Lyga football competition in Lithuania. It was contested by 16 teams, and Inkaras Kaunas won the championship.

== Group I ==
Pos	Team	Pld	W	D	L	GF	GA	GD	Pts
1	Žalgiris Kybartai	7	6	1	0	36	12	+24	13
2	Elnias Šiauliai	7	6	0	1	29	5	+24	12
3	Audiniai Kaunas	7	4	0	3	26	18	+8	8
4	Žalgiris Panevėžys	7	3	2	2	15	16	−1	8
5	Spartakas Vilnius	7	3	0	4	16	16	0	6
6	Žalgiris Ukmergė	7	2	1	4	10	27	−17	5
7	CF Marijampolė	7	1	2	4	13	16	−3	4
8	Žalgiris Tauragė	7	0	0	7	8	43	−35	0

Source: rsssf.com

== Group II ==
Pos	Team	Pld	W	D	L	GF	GA	GD	Pts
1	Inkaras Kaunas	7	7	0	0	35	3	+32	14
2	FSK Kaunas	7	4	1	2	11	12	−1	9
3	Audra Klaipėda	7	4	0	3	21	13	+8	8
4	Dinamo Utena	7	4	0	3	16	12	+4	8
5	Dinamo Vilnius	7	2	2	3	13	18	−5	6
6	ASK Kaunas	7	2	0	5	12	17	−5	4
7	Spartakas Plungė	7	1	2	4	12	20	−8	4
8	Spartakas Kaunas	7	1	1	5	4	29	−25	3

Source: rsssf.com

== Final ==
Pos	Team	Pld	W	D	L	GF	GA	GD	Pts
1	Inkaras Kaunas	14	13	0	1	61	10	+51	26
2	Elnias Šiauliai	14	12	0	2	58	10	+48	24
3	Audra Klaipėda	14	7	0	7	24	41	−17	14
4	FSK Kaunas	14	5	2	7	37	48	−11	12
5	Žalgiris Kybartai	14	6	0	8	21	48	−27	12
6	Dinamo Utena	14	5	0	9	28	28	0	10
7	Audiniai Kaunas	14	4	2	8	30	40	−10	10
8	Žalgiris Panevėžys	14	1	2	11	21	55	−34	4
9	Dinamo Vilnius	7	7	0	0	21	3	+18	14
10	ASK Kaunas	7	3	3	1	22	11	+11	9
11	Žalgiris Ukmergė	7	4	1	2	15	12	+3	9
12	Spartakas Vilnius	7	4	1	2	7	11	−4	9
13	CF Marijampolė	7	3	1	3	9	9	0	7
14	Spartakas Plungė	7	1	1	5	9	17	−8	3
15	Spartakas Kaunas	7	1	1	5	5	15	−10	3
16	Žalgiris Tauragė	7	1	0	6	2	12	−10	2

Source: rsssf.com
