= 1985 LFF Lyga =

LFF Lyga
- Season: 1985

The 1985 LFF Lyga was the 64th season of the LFF Lyga football competition in Lithuania. It was contested by 17 teams, and Ekranas Panevezys won the championship.

== League standings ==
Pos	Team	Pld	W	D	L	GF	GA	GD	Pts
1	Ekranas Panevezys	31	23	4	4	56	18	+38	50
2	Granitas Klaipėda	31	20	6	5	60	20	+40	46
3	SRT Vilnius	31	20	4	7	66	25	+41	44
4	Pazanga Vilnius	31	19	6	6	38	18	+20	44
5	Nevezis Kedainiai	31	12	13	6	42	30	+12	37
6	Banga Kaunas	31	15	7	9	45	23	+22	37
7	Atmosfera Mazeikiai	31	12	7	12	34	32	+2	31
8	Kelininkas Kaunas	31	11	9	11	35	38	−3	31
9	Vienybe Ukmerge	31	11	7	13	34	40	−6	29
10	Utenis Utena	31	11	6	14	32	38	−6	28
11	Tauras Siauliai	31	11	6	14	36	46	−10	28
12	Inkaras Kaunas	31	10	6	15	36	44	−8	26
13	Aidas Kaunas	31	6	12	13	28	46	−18	24
14	Sveikata Kybartai	31	5	9	17	29	65	−36	19
15	Statybininkas Siauliai	31	5	9	17	16	44	−28	19
16	Statyba Jonava	31	4	7	20	26	57	−31	15
17	Jauniu rinktine	16	2	0	14	7	36	−29	4

Source: rsssf.com
