= 1986 LFF Lyga =

LFF Lyga
- Season: 1986

The 1986 LFF Lyga was the 65th season of the LFF Lyga football competition in Lithuania. It was contested by 16 teams, and Banga Kaunas won the championship.

== League standings ==
| Pos | Team | Pld | W | D | L | GF | GA | GD | Pts |
|---|---|---|---|---|---|---|---|---|---|
| 1 | Banga Kaunas | 28 | 19 | 7 | 2 | 50 | 13 | +37 | 45 |
| 2 | Granitas Klaipėda | 28 | 18 | 7 | 3 | 55 | 23 | +32 | 43 |
| 3 | Ekranas Panevezys | 28 | 20 | 3 | 5 | 45 | 21 | +24 | 43 |
| 4 | SRT Vilnius | 28 | 13 | 6 | 9 | 39 | 25 | +14 | 32 |
| 5 | Nevezis Kedainiai | 28 | 12 | 6 | 10 | 31 | 29 | +2 | 30 |
| 6 | Inkaras Kaunas | 28 | 11 | 6 | 11 | 29 | 28 | +1 | 28 |
| 7 | Atmosfera Mazeikiai | 28 | 8 | 11 | 9 | 28 | 33 | −5 | 27 |
| 8 | Aidas Kaunas | 28 | 8 | 9 | 11 | 32 | 31 | +1 | 25 |
| 9 | Sveikata Kybartai | 28 | 7 | 11 | 10 | 19 | 34 | −15 | 25 |
| 10 | Ausra Vilnius | 28 | 7 | 10 | 11 | 23 | 35 | −12 | 24 |
| 11 | Tauras Siauliai | 28 | 8 | 7 | 13 | 31 | 36 | −5 | 23 |
| 12 | Kelininkas Kaunas | 28 | 6 | 11 | 11 | 20 | 27 | −7 | 23 |
| 13 | Utenis Utena | 28 | 7 | 8 | 13 | 30 | 46 | −16 | 22 |
| 14 | Vienybe Ukmerge | 28 | 6 | 7 | 15 | 23 | 45 | −22 | 19 |
| 15 | Kooperatininkas | 28 | 3 | 5 | 20 | 17 | 46 | −29 | 11 |
| 16 | Pazanga Vilnius | 0 | – | – | – | – | – | — | 0 |

Source: rsssf.com
