= Fahad Ishmail =

Somali footballer

Personal information
- Full name: Fahad Abdisamed Ishmail
- Date of birth: 2 September 1996 (age 30)
- Place of birth: Golweyn, Somalia
- Position: Midfielder

Youth career
- 2013–2015: Sheffield United

Senior career*
Years	Team	Apps	(Gls)
- Boston United
2017	FK Minija	5	(0)
2018	Jonava	11	(0)

International career^{‡}
2019–	Somalia	1	(0)
- * Club domestic league appearances and goals as of 00:00, 14 September 2019 (UTC) ‡ National team caps and goals as of 00:00, 14 September 2019 (UTC)

Fahad Abdisamed Ishmail (Somali: Fahad Xabdusamed Ismaciil; born 2 September 1996) is a Somali footballer who last played as a midfielder for Jonava.

== Club career ==
Born in Golweyn, Somalia, Ishmail joined English club Sheffield United as a youth player in 2013. Following his release in 2015, Ishmail played for Boston United, as well as spending time in Norway, playing on trial for Ullern IF. In 2017, Ishmail joined Lithuanian club FK Minija, making five appearances for the club, before signing for Jonava in January 2018, making 11 A Lyga appearances.

== International career ==
On 5 September 2019, Ishmail made his debut for Somalia in a 1–0 win against Zimbabwe, marking Somalia's first ever FIFA World Cup qualification victory.
