= 1979 LFF Lyga =

LFF Lyga
- Season: 1979

The 1979 LFF Lyga was the 58th season of the LFF Lyga football competition in Lithuania. It was contested by 17 teams, and Atmosfera Mazeikiai won the championship.

== League standings ==
Pos	Team	Pld	W	D	L	GF	GA	GD	Pts
1	Atmosfera Mazeikiai	32	22	6	4	46	15	+31	50
2	Kelininkas Kaunas	32	20	9	3	74	35	+39	49
3	Nevezis Kedainiai	32	15	10	7	49	28	+21	40
4	Tauras Siauliai	32	15	8	9	47	32	+15	38
5	Statybininkas Siauliai	32	13	11	8	37	23	+14	37
6	Atletas Kaunas	32	11	13	8	33	28	+5	35
7	Dainava Alytus	32	12	10	10	39	38	+1	34
8	Politechnika Kaunas	32	11	10	11	43	42	+1	32
9	Pazanga Vilnius	32	10	11	11	38	38	0	31
10	Vienybe Ukmerge	32	10	11	11	30	34	−4	31
11	Granitas Klaipėda	32	9	9	14	43	43	0	27
12	Utenis Utena	32	9	9	14	35	45	−10	27
13	Ausra Vilnius	32	9	9	14	22	33	−11	27
14	Banga Kaunas	32	9	9	14	29	46	−17	27
15	Ekranas Panevezys	32	6	10	16	29	56	−27	22
16	Sviesa Vilnius	32	7	7	18	33	52	−19	21
17	Kooperatininkas Plunge	32	5	6	21	30	69	−39	16

Source: rsssf.com
