= 1981 LFF Lyga =

LFF Lyga
- Season: 1981

The 1981 LFF Lyga was the 60th season of the LFF Lyga football competition in Lithuania. It was contested by 18 teams, and Granitas Klaipeda won the championship.

== League standings ==
Pos	Team	Pld	W	D	L	GF	GA	GD	Pts
1	Granitas Klaipeda	34	20	10	4	55	22	+33	50
2	Kelininkas Kaunas	34	20	7	7	44	20	+24	47
3	Pazanga Vilnius	34	18	9	7	35	25	+10	45
4	Tauras Siauliai	34	17	8	9	51	28	+23	42
5	Statybininkas Siauliai	34	15	12	7	41	19	+22	42
6	Atmosfera Mazeikiai	34	13	13	8	34	24	+10	39
7	Vienybe Ukmerge	34	14	11	9	33	25	+8	39
8	Ekranas Panevezys	34	14	9	11	39	34	+5	37
9	Politechnika Kaunas	34	10	15	9	27	26	+1	35
10	Banga Kaunas	34	12	9	13	41	40	+1	33
11	Inkaras Kaunas	34	12	9	13	41	49	−8	33
12	Ausra Vilnius	34	10	12	12	39	38	+1	32
13	Statyba Jonava	34	11	10	13	35	41	−6	32
14	Nevezis Kedainiai	34	10	9	15	42	47	−5	29
15	Sviesa Vilnius	34	10	7	17	36	48	−12	27
16	Dainava Alytus	34	7	7	20	21	55	−34	21
17	Utenis Utena	34	7	4	23	25	42	−17	18
18	Sveikata Kybartai	34	3	6	25	30	86	−56	12

Source: rsssf.com
