= 1934 LFF Lyga =

LFF Lyga
- Season: 1934
- Champions: MSK Kaunas
- Matches played: 73
- Goals scored: 170 (2.33 per match)

The 1934 LFF Lyga was the 13th season of the LFF Lyga football competition in Lithuania. It was contested by 7 teams, and MSK Kaunas won the championship.

== League standings ==
Pos	Team	Pld	W	D	L	GF	GA	GD	Pts
1	MSK Kaunas	11	6	2	3	30	14	+16	14
2	LFLS Kaunas	11	6	2	3	28	12	+16	14
3	LGSF Kaunas	11	6	2	3	31	18	+13	14
4	Kovas Kaunas	11	5	3	3	34	15	+19	13
5	KSS Klaipėda	11	4	2	5	22	33	−11	10
6	Sveikata Kybartai	11	2	3	6	19	36	−17	7
7	Makabi Panevėžys	6	0	0	6	2	38	−36	0

Source: rsssf.com

=== Playoff ===
- MSK Kaunas 2-2; 5-1 LFLS Kaunas
