= 1927 LFF Lyga =

LFF Lyga
- Season: 1927
- Champions: LFLS Kaunas
- Matches played: 52
- Longest winning run: LFLS Kaunas (8 games)
- Longest unbeaten run: LFLS Kaunas (8 games)

The 1927 LFF Lyga was the 6th season of the LFF Lyga football competition in Lithuania. Statistics of the LFF Lyga for the 1927 season. LFLS Kaunas won the championship.

== Kaunas Group ==
Pos	Team	Pld	W	D	L	GF	GA	GD	Pts
1	LFLS Kaunas	8	8	0	0	26	4	+22	16
2	KSK Kaunas	8	4	1	3	18	15	+3	9
3	Kovas Kaunas	8	3	0	5	8	9	−1	6
4	Makabi Kaunas	8	2	1	5	10	20	−10	5
5	Sparta Kaunas	8	1	2	5	4	18	−14	4

Source: rsssf.com

== Klaipėda Group ==
=== North Division ===
Pos	Team	Pld	W	D	L	GF	GA	GD	Pts
1	Spielvereiningung Klaipėda	8	6	1	1	30	18	+12	13
2	KSS Klaipėda	8	6	0	2	40	14	+26	12
3	Freya Klaipėda	8	3	1	4	21	23	−2	7
4	Spielvereiningung Klaipėda II	8	3	1	4	16	27	−11	7
5	Vorwarts Šilutė	8	0	1	7	13	38	−25	1

Source: rsssf.com

=== South Division ===
Pos	Team	Pld	W	D	L	Pts
1	SV Pagėgiai	6	6	0	0	12
2	SV Gudai	6	–	–	–	6
3	SV Juknaičiai	6	–	–	–	4
4	SV Stoniškiai	6	–	–	–	2

Source: rsssf.com

=== Klaipėda Group Final ===
- Sportverein Pagėgiai 2-1 Spielvereiningung Klaipėda

== Šiauliai Group ==
Pos	Team
1	LFLS Šiauliai
2	Makabi Šiauliai

Source: rsssf.com

== Final ==
- LFLS Kaunas 3-1 Sportverein Pagėgiai
