= 1938–39 LFF Lyga =

LFF Lyga
- Season: 1938–39
- Champions: LGSF Kaunas
- Matches: 49
- Goals: 181 (3.69 per match)

The 1938–39 LFF Lyga was the 18th season of the LFF Lyga football competition in Lithuania. It was contested by 8 teams, and LGSF Kaunas won the championship.

== League standings ==
Pos	Team	Pld	W	D	L	GF	GA	GD	Pts
1	LGSF Kaunas	13	8	1	4	31	20	+11	17
2	Kovas Kaunas	13	8	0	5	28	18	+10	16
3	KSS Klaipėda/Telšiai	13	8	0	5	34	31	+3	16
4	Tauras Kaunas	13	5	3	5	21	17	+4	13
5	CJSO Kaunas	13	5	3	5	23	24	−1	13
6	LFLS Kaunas	13	4	3	6	20	25	−5	11
7	MSK Kaunas	13	4	1	8	15	26	−11	9
8	Švyturys Klaipėda	7	1	1	5	9	20	−11	3

Source: rsssf.com
