= 1947 LFF Lyga =

LFF Lyga
- Season: 1947

The 1947 LFF Lyga was the 26th season of the LFF Lyga football competition in Lithuania. It was contested by 10 teams, and Lokomotyvas Kaunas won the championship.

== League standings ==
Pos	Team	Pld	W	D	L	GF	GA	GD	Pts
1	Lokomotyvas Kaunas	17	14	0	3	51	23	+28	28
2	Spartakas Šiauliai	17	11	1	5	58	30	+28	23
3	Žalgiris Klaipėda	17	10	3	4	33	29	+4	23
4	Spartakas Kaunas	17	10	2	5	55	39	+16	22
5	Dinamo Kaunas	17	7	3	7	43	31	+12	17
6	Vėliava Šiauliai	17	7	1	9	51	43	+8	15
7	Žalgiris Marijampolė	17	6	3	8	33	38	−5	15
8	Žalgiris Panevėžys	17	7	1	9	21	33	−12	15
9	Dinamo Vilnius	17	2	0	15	11	49	−38	4
10	Žalgiris Vilnius	9	0	0	9	3	44	−41	0

Source: rsssf.com
