= 2010 A Lyga =

A Lyga
- Season: 2010
- Champions: Ekranas; 6th title
- Relegated: Atletas Kaunas
- Champions League: Ekranas
- Europa League: Sūduva Marijampolė; Tauras Tauragė; Banga Gargždai
- Baltic League: Ekranas; Sūduva Marijampolė; Žalgiris Vilnius; Tauras Tauragė; Šiauliai
- Matches played: 135
- Goals scored: 370 (2.74 per match)
- Top goalscorer: Povilas Lukšys (16 goals)
- Biggest home win: Sūduva 7–0 Klaipėda
- Biggest away win: Klaipėda 0–7 Šiauliai
- Highest scoring: Klaipėda 1–6 Sūduva; Sūduva 7–0 Klaipėda; Klaipėda 0–7 Šiauliai

The 2010 Lithuanian A Lyga was the 21st season of top-tier football in Lithuania. The season began on 20 March 2010 and ended on 14 November 2010. Ekranas were the defending champions and retained the title. This was their sixth league title and third in a row.

== Teams ==
=== Stadia, locations and coaches ===
Location of teams in the 2010 A Lyga

Club	Location	Stadium	Capacity	Current manager
Atletas	Kaunas	S. Darius and S. Girėnas Stadium	9,180	(Lithuania) Saulius Širmelis
Banga	Gargždai	Gargždai Stadium	1,800	(Lithuania) Arminas Narbekovas
Ekranas	Panevėžys	Aukštaitija Stadium	4,000	(Lithuania) Valdas Urbonas
Klaipėda	Klaipėda	Žalgiris Stadium (Klaipėda)	5,000	(Lithuania) Saulius Mikalajūnas
Kruoja	Pakruojis	Pakruojis Stadium	2,000	(Lithuania) Albertas Klimavičius
Mažeikiai	Mažeikiai	Sports Centre Stadium	2,300	(Lithuania) Nerijus Gudaitis
Sūduva	Marijampolė	Sūduva Stadium	6,260	(Lithuania) Donatas Vencevičius
Šiauliai	Šiauliai	Savivaldybė Stadium	3,000	(Lithuania) Deivis Kančelskis
Tauras	Tauragė	Vytauto Stadium	1,600	(Lithuania) Gedeminas Jarmalavičius
Vėtra	Vilnius	Vėtra Stadium	5,300	(Lithuania) Virginijus Liubšys
Žalgiris	Vilnius	Žalgiris Stadium	15,030	(Lithuania) Igoris Pankratjevas

== League table ==
Pos	Team	Pld	W	D	L	GF	GA	GD	Pts	Qualification or relegation
1	Ekranas (C)	27	20	3	4	64	19	+45	63	Qualification to Champions League second qualifying round
2	Sūduva	27	16	8	3	56	16	+40	56 (Note: SŪD: 3 pts, 1-1; ŽAL: 3 pts, 1–1)	Qualification to Europa League second qualifying round
3	Žalgiris	27	16	8	3	47	16	+31	56	
4	Tauras	27	14	5	8	41	27	+14	47	Qualification to Europa League second qualifying round (Note: Žalgiris were denied a licence for UEFA competitions, so Tauras inherited their UEFA Europa League spot.)
5	Šiauliai	27	11	8	8	37	28	+9	41	
6	Banga	27	10	9	8	34	30	+4	39	Qualification to Europa League first qualifying round (Note: Banga were the runners-up of the 2010–11 Lithuanian Football Cup competition to Ekranas. Since Ekranas is qualified for Champions League, Banga entered the first qualifying round of UEFA Europa League as cup runners-up.)
7	Kruoja	27	8	11	8	41	45	−4	35	
8	Klaipėda	27	3	6	18	19	74	−55	15	
9	Mažeikiai	27	2	6	19	17	59	−42	12	
10	Atletas	27	0	6	21	14	56	−42	0 (Note: Atletas were docked 6 points at the start of the season due to irregularities in the licensing process.)	Relegation to I Lyga
—	Vėtra	16	8	6	2	30	13	+17	21 (Note: Vėtra were docked 6 points at the start of the season due to irregularities in the licensing process together with Atletas. They were later docked 3 more points due to debt to former player Almir Sulejmanovič.)	Expelled from competition, disbanded (Note: After round 17 Vėtra were expelled from championship due to financial troubles. All their results were annulled.)

Source: www2.omnitel.net
Rules for classification: 1) points; 2) head-to-head points; 3) head-to-head goal difference; 4) head-to-head goals scored; 5) goal difference; 6) number of goals scored.
(C) Champions

== Results ==
Every team will play each other three times for a total of 30 games.

Note: All Vėtra results listed below were annulled after the club was expelled from championship. They are listed here for information purposes. Matches which were to be competed after Vėtra's exemption have been shaded.

=== First and second rounds ===
Home \ Away	ATL	BAN	EKR	KLA	KRU	MAŽ	SŪD	ŠIA	TAU	VĖT	ŽAL
Atletas		0–0	0–3	0–1	1–2	1–2	0–5	1–2	0–1	0–3	0–2
Banga	3–0		0–3	1–1	0–3	2–1	0–2	2–1	2–1	1–1	1–1
Ekranas	1–0	0–0		2–1	4–1	5–0	1–1	3–1	4–1	3–2	3–0
Klaipėda	1–0	0–3	1–4		1–2	2–2	1–6	0–2	2–3	1–3	0–3
Kruoja	1–1	2–3	0–2	1–1		1–0	0–2	3–3	3–3	1–1	1–1
Mažeikiai	2–2	2–2	0–2	1–1	0–2		1–2	0–1	1–3	1–4	0–1
Sūduva	3–1	0–0	1–1	4–0	2–1	3–0		1–1	3–1		0–0
Šiauliai	1–1	1–0	1–2	2–1	2–2	2–1	0–0		0–1	0–0	1–3
Tauras	2–0	2–0	2–1	2–0	4–0	0–0	0–1	0–0		0–0	1–1
Vėtra	0–0	2–1		1–1	3–0	3–0	3–1				3–1
Žalgiris	4–1	2–0	0–1	3–0	3–1	6–0	1–1	1–0	1–0	2–1	

Source: www2.omnitel.net
Legend: Blue = home team win; Yellow = draw; Red = away team win.

=== Third round ===
Home \ Away	ATL	BAN	EKR	KLA	KRU	MAŽ	SŪD	ŠIA	TAU	VĖT	ŽAL
Atletas			0–5	2–3	0–1		1–4		0–1		
Banga	1–0					6–1		0–1			1–1
Ekranas		2–3		5–0	3–2			2–1			
Klaipėda		1–1			1–1			0–7			0–4
Kruoja		1–1				2–0		2–2			2–2
Mažeikiai	1–1		0–3	1–0			1–3		0–3		
Sūduva		1–0	2–0	7–0	1–2			0–1			
Šiauliai	1–1					1–0			0–1		2–0
Tauras		0–2	0–2	5–0	2–2		2–1				
Vėtra											
Žalgiris	3–0		1–0			2–0	0–0		1–0		

Source: www2.omnitel.net
Legend: Blue = home team win; Yellow = draw; Red = away team win.

== Goalscorers ==
Including matches played on 14 November 2010; Source: Lietuvos futbolo statistika

=== Top goalscorers ===
Pos.	Player	Club	Goals
1	(Lithuania) Povilas Lukšys	Sūduva	16
2	(Latvia) Vits Rimkus	Ekranas	15
3	(Lithuania) Dominykas Galkevičius	Ekranas	12
4	(Lithuania) Artūras Jeršovas	Žalgiris	11
5	(Lithuania) Andrius Urbšys	Sūduva	10
6	(Lithuania) Aurelijus Staponka	Banga	9
7	(Lithuania) Egidijus Varnas	Ekranas	8
7	(Lithuania) Tautvydas Švelna	Kruoja	8
7	(Ukraine) Viktor Raskov	Šiauliai	8
10	(Lithuania) Ramūnas Radavičius	Ekranas	7
10	(Lithuania) Mantas Kuklys	Šiauliai	7
12	3 players		6
15	9 players		5
24	13 players		4
37	18 players		3
55	23 players		2
78	37 players		1
Own goals			7
Total:			370
Games:			135
Average:			2.74
