= 1925 LFF Lyga =

LFF Lyga
- Season: 1925
- Champions: Kovas Kaunas

The 1925 LFF Lyga was the 4th season of the LFF Lyga football competition in Lithuania. It was contested by 13 teams, and Kovas Kaunas won the championship.

== Kaunas Group ==
Pos	Team	Pld	W	D	L	GF	GA	GD	Pts
1	Kovas Kaunas	6	5	0	1	13	4	+9	10
2	LFLS Kaunas	6	3	0	3	11	11	0	6
3	KSK Kaunas	6	2	1	3	10	13	−3	5
4	Makabi Kaunas	6	1	1	4	5	11	−6	3

Source: rsssf.com

== Klaipėda Group ==
Pos	Team	Pld	W	D	L	GF	GA	GD	Pts
1	Freya Klaipėda	10	8	1	1	27	13	+14	17
2	Spielvereiningung Klaipėda	10	7	1	2	36	15	+21	15
3	MTV Klaipėda	10	5	1	4	26	22	+4	11
4	Vorwarts Šilutė	10	3	2	5	14	18	−4	8
5	VfR Klaipėda	10	3	0	7	9	30	−21	6
6	Sportverein Klaipėda	10	1	1	8	8	22	−14	3

Source: rsssf.com

== Šiauliai Group ==
Pos	Team	Pld	W	D	L	GF	GA	GD	Pts
1	LFLS Šiauliai	4	4	0	0	15	3	+12	8
2	Žiežirba Šiauliai	4	2	0	2	4	10	−6	4
3	Makabi Šiauliai	4	0	0	4	2	8	−6	0

Source: rsssf.com

== Final ==
- Kovas Kaunas 2-0 LFLS Šiauliai
