= 1933 LFF Lyga =

LFF Lyga
- Season: 1933
- Champions: Kovas Kaunas
- Matches played: 82
- Goals scored: 155 (1.89 per match)

Statistics of the LFF Lyga for the 1933 season.

== Overview ==
It was contested by 7 teams, and Kovas Kaunas won the championship.

== League standings ==
| Pos | Team | Pld | W | D | L | GF | GA | GD | Pts |
|---|---|---|---|---|---|---|---|---|---|
| 1 | Kovas Kaunas | 12 | 8 | 3 | 1 | 33 | 13 | +20 | 19 |
| 2 | LFLS Kaunas | 12 | 7 | 4 | 1 | 23 | 16 | +7 | 18 |
| 3 | LGSF Kaunas | 12 | 5 | 2 | 5 | 37 | 27 | +10 | 12 |
| 4 | KSS Klaipėda | 12 | 5 | 1 | 6 | 28 | 24 | +4 | 11 |
| 5 | Spielvereiningung Klaipėda | 12 | 5 | 1 | 6 | 11 | 15 | −4 | 11 |
| 6 | Makabi Kaunas | 12 | 1 | 4 | 7 | 13 | 36 | −23 | 6 |
| 7 | Sveikata Kybartai | 12 | 0 | 5 | 7 | 10 | 24 | −14 | 5 |

Source: rsssf.com
