= 1922 LFF Lyga =

LFF Lyga
- Season: 1922
- Champions: LFLS Kaunas I

The 1922 LFF Lyga was the 1st season of the LFF Lyga football competition in Lithuania. It was contested by 6 teams, and LFLS Kaunas I won the championship.

== League standings ==
Pos	Team	Pld	W	D	L	GF	GA	GD	Pts
1	LFLS Kaunas I	9	9	0	0	48	4	+44	18
2	LFLS Šančiai	9	4	2	3	20	7	+13	10
3	LFLS Kaunas II	9	4	0	5	3	29	−26	8
4	Aviacija Kaunas	5	3	1	1	7	5	+2	7
5	Makabi Kaunas	9	3	1	5	5	10	−5	7
6	BAB	9	0	0	9	1	29	−28	0

Source: rsssf.com
