= 1924 LFF Lyga =

LFF Lyga
- Season: 1924
- Champions: Kovas Kaunas

The 1924 LFF Lyga was the 3rd season of the LFF Lyga football competition in Lithuania. It was contested by 10 teams, and Kovas Kaunas won the championship.

== Kaunas Group ==
Pos	Team	Pld	W	D	L	GF	GA	GD	Pts
1	Kovas Kaunas	6	4	1	1	15	5	+10	9
2	LFLS Kaunas	6	3	2	1	17	8	+9	8
3	KSK Kaunas	6	2	0	4	12	17	−5	4
4	Makabi Kaunas	6	1	1	4	5	19	−14	3

Source: rsssf.com

== Klaipėda Group ==
Pos	Team	Pld	W	D	L	GF	GA	GD	Pts
1	Sportverein Klaipėda	5	4	0	1	16	7	+9	8
2	MTV Klaipėda	5	3	0	2	14	10	+4	6
3	MTV Šilutė	5	3	0	2	7	8	−1	6
4	Freya Klaipėda	5	3	0	2	11	15	−4	6
5	Spielvereiningung Klaipėda	5	2	0	3	17	12	+5	4
6	Šarūnas Klaipėda	5	0	0	5	6	19	−13	0

Source: rsssf.com

== Final ==
- Kovas Kaunas 2-1 Sportverein Klaipėda
