= 1941 LFF Lyga =

LFF Lyga
- Season: 1941
- Champions: none (abandoned)

The 1941 LFF Lyga was the 20th season of the LFF Lyga football competition in Lithuania. It was abandoned.

== League standings ==
Pos	Team	Pld	W	D	L	GF	GA	GD	Pts
1	Spartakas Kaunas	5	5	0	0	30	3	+27	10
2	Spartakas Vilnius	4	3	0	1	8	9	−1	6
3	Dinamo Kaunas	2	2	0	0	5	1	+4	4
4	Spartuolis Vilnius	4	2	0	2	11	7	+4	4
5	Spartuolis Kaunas	4	2	0	2	9	8	+1	4
6	Dinamo Vilnius	3	1	0	2	4	12	−8	2
7	Spartuolis Kaunas II	4	0	0	4	3	10	−7	0
8	Spartakas Šiauliai	4	0	0	4	4	24	−20	0

Source: rsssf.com
