= 1936 LFF Lyga =

LFF Lyga
- Season: 1936
- Champions: Kovas Kaunas
- Matches played: 28
- Goals scored: 106 (3.79 per match)

The 1936 LFF Lyga was the 15th season of the LFF Lyga football competition in Lithuania. It was contested by 8 teams, and Kovas Kaunas won the championship.

== League standings ==
Pos	Team	Pld	W	D	L	GF	GA	GD	Pts
1	Kovas Kaunas	7	7	0	0	25	3	+22	14
2	LFLS Kaunas	7	5	0	2	15	13	+2	10
3	LGSF Kaunas	7	4	0	3	12	12	0	8
4	MSK Kaunas	7	3	1	3	13	7	+6	7
5	Tauras Kaunas	7	3	0	4	11	16	−5	6
6	CJSO Kaunas	7	3	0	4	7	15	−8	6
7	KSS Klaipėda	7	2	1	4	18	15	+3	5
8	Šaulys Klaipėda	7	0	0	7	5	25	−20	0

Source: rsssf.com
