= 1946 LFF Lyga =

LFF Lyga
- Season: 1946

The 1946 LFF Lyga was the 25th season of the LFF Lyga football competition in Lithuania. It was contested by 8 teams, and Dinamo Kaunas won the championship.

== League standings ==
Pos	Team	Pld	W	D	L	GF	GA	GD	Pts
1	Dinamo Kaunas	7	6	1	0	32	11	+21	13
2	Spartakas Kaunas	7	5	0	2	27	11	+16	10
3	Lokomotyvas Panevėžys	7	3	3	1	12	14	−2	9
4	Spartakas Šiauliai	7	4	0	3	33	28	+5	8
5	Lokomotyvas Kaunas	7	3	1	3	20	15	+5	7
6	Žalgiris Vilnius	7	1	2	4	9	21	−12	4
7	Audra Klaipėda	7	2	0	5	12	30	−18	4
8	Dinamo Vilnius	7	0	1	6	15	30	−15	1

Source: rsssf.com
