= 1923 LFF Lyga =

LFF Lyga
- Season: 1923
- Champions: LFLS Kaunas

The 1923 LFF Lyga was the 2nd season of the LFF Lyga football competition in Lithuania. It was contested by 4 teams, and LFLS Kaunas won the championship.

== League standings ==
Pos	Team	Pld	W	D	L	GF	GA	GD	Pts
1	LFLS Kaunas	5	3	1	1	12	4	+8	7
2	KSK Kaunas	5	2	1	2	10	13	−3	5
3	Kovas Kaunas	5	1	2	2	6	9	−3	4
4	Makabi Kaunas	3	1	0	2	1	3	−2	2

Source: rsssf.com
