= Toplyga =

- Founded: 1991; 35 years ago
- Country: Lithuania
- Confederation: UEFA
- Number of clubs: 9 (2026) (Note: Following the expulsion of FK Riteriai)*; 10 (2027)
- Level on pyramid: 1
- Relegation to: I Lyga
- Domestic cup(s): LFF Cup; Lithuanian Supercup
- International cup(s): UEFA Champions League; UEFA Europa League; UEFA Conference League
- Current champions: Kauno Žalgiris (2nd title) (2026)
- Most championships: FK Žalgiris (11 titles)
- Broadcaster: LNK
- Website: www.toplyga.lt
- Current: 2026 Toplyga

The Toplyga, previously the A Lyga (2001–2025), is the top division of professional football in Lithuania. It is organized by the Lithuanian Football Federation.

== History ==
The first football league in Lithuania was established in 1924, and in various forms existed until 1939. Due to the Polish–Lithuanian War, clubs from Vilnius did not take part in early period of the Lithuanian football competitions.

Later during the period of Soviet occupation, a Lithuanian amateur top division existed, while professional players played in USSR football competitions. The Lithuanian professional top division was restored in 1990. The naming convention changed several times, but since 1999 the league is consistently referred to as A lyga.

On 5 February 2026, it was officially announced that the new name of the Lithuanian football championship would be renamed to TOPLYGA.

=== Format ===
The league system and size have also stabilized since 1999. League size varied mostly between 8 and 10 teams, with the exceptions of 2011 A Lyga featuring 12 teams, and 2020 A Lyga record low of only 6 teams. The teams play 4 rounds in regular season. The bottom placed team is relegated, while the 9th placed team contests a play-off with the 2nd placed team from the I lyga. The final list of participants often did not correlate to the final results of the previous season, as the participation were rather finalized through the Lithuanian Football Federation league licensing process.

The season usually kicks off in February or March and ends in November. Because of the harsh climate, there are no games in winter, and early spring (April/March) games may be played in indoor arenas on artificial grass, depending on the weather. The winter transfer window opens in early January and lasts until mid March, while the summer transfer window lasts for most of July.

=== European competitions ===
Lithuania sought to participate in the UEFA club competitions immediately after regaining the independence. However, due to political reasons, in 1991 Lithuania was banned by UEFA from continental competitions and Žalgiris was refused licensing to compete as a Lithuanian club rather than a Soviet club. Eventually, Lithuania became affiliated with UEFA in 1992. The A Lyga champion secures the right to play in UEFA Champions League qualification. The runner up and the 3rd-place team secure right to play in UEFA Europa Conference League qualification.

The best Lithuanian club result in UEFA competitions was achieved in 2022-23 UEFA club competition season by FK Žalgiris. The Lithuanian champions reached the group stage in the 2022–23 UEFA Europa Conference League. After the 2022-23 UEFA season, FK Žalgiris was the best performing A lyga club in Europe, taking #130 in UEFA Club Coefficients table.

== Clubs ==
Club	Location	Position in 2024	First season in A Lyga	Seasons in top division	First season of current spell	Top division titles	Last title
Banga	Gargždai	5th	1994	12	2020	—	
DFK Dainava	Alytus	4th	2021	4^{c}	2023	—	
Džiugas^{b}	Telšiai	6th	2021	5	2021	—	
Hegelmann^{b}	Kaunas District	2nd	2021	5	2021	—	
Kauno Žalgiris^{b}	Kaunas	3rd	2015	11	2015	—	
Panevėžys^{b}	Panevėžys	8th	2019	7	2019	1	2023
Riteriai	Vilnius	I Lyga, 1st	2014	11	2025	—	
Sūduva^{a}	Marijampolė	9th	1990	24	2002	3	2019
FA Šiauliai^{b}	Šiauliai	7th	2022	4	2022	—	
Žalgiris^{a}	Vilnius	1st	1990	34	2010	11	2024

^{a} Founding member of the A Lyga
^{b} Never been relegated from the A Lyga
^{c} Two former clubs, named FK Dainava have participated in A lyga in 2001, 2011, 2012, 2013, 2014

Locations of the 2026 Toplyga teams

== Sponsorship ==
Period	Sponsor	Name
1991–1999	No sponsor	Lietuvos Lyga
1999–2000	No sponsor	LFF Lyga
2001–2003	No sponsor	LFF A Lyga
2004–2008	No sponsor	NFKA A Lyga
2009–2011	No sponsor	LFF A Lyga
2012	General Financing	LFF General Financing A Lyga
2013–2016	Credit Service	SMScredit.lt A Lyga
2017–2020	No sponsor	LFF A Lyga
2021–2023	Baltic Bet	Optibet A Lyga
2024–2025	TOPsport	TOPsport A Lyga
2026–	TOPsport	TOPLYGA

The official ball supplier for the A lyga games in 2023 is Adidas. Nike held this contract between 2013 and 2022, when they took over from Adidas.

== Hall of Fame ==
=== Interbellum and WWII ===
After Lithuania gained independence in 1918, the first ever football tournament was held in 1922.

==== Seasons ====
Season	Winner	Runner-up	Third place
**Interbellum** (Independent Lithuania)
1922	**LFLS Kaunas**	LFLS Šančiai	LFLS-2 Kaunas
1923	**LFLS Kaunas**	KSK Kaunas	Kovas Kaunas
1924	**Kovas Kaunas**	Sportverein Klaipėda	LFLS Kaunas / MTV Klaipėda
1925	**Kovas Kaunas**	LFLS Šiauliai	Freya Klaipėda
1926	**Kovas Kaunas**	KSS Klaipėda	LFLS Šiauliai
1927	**LFLS Kaunas**	Sportverein Pagėgiai	LFLS Šiauliai
1928	**KSS Klaipėda**	LFLS Kaunas	LDS Šiauliai
1929	**KSS Klaipėda**	LFLS Kaunas	KSK Kultus Kaunas / Freya Klaipėda
1930	**KSS Klaipėda**	LFLS Kaunas	Sveikata Kybartai / Makabi Šiauliai
1931	**KSS Klaipėda**	Kovas Kaunas	Freya Klaipėda
1932	**LFLS Kaunas**	KSS Klaipėda	LGSF Kaunas
1933	**Kovas Kaunas**	LFLS Kaunas	LGSF Kaunas
1934	**MSK Kaunas**	LFLS Kaunas	LGSF Kaunas
1935	**Kovas Kaunas**	KSS Klaipėda	Sakalas Šiauliai / Šaulys Ukmergė
1936	**Kovas Kaunas**	LFLS Kaunas	LGSF Kaunas
1937	**KSS Klaipėda**	Kovas Kaunas	LFLS Kaunas
1937–38	**KSS Klaipėda**	LGSF Kaunas	Švyturys Klaipėda
1938–39	**LGSF Kaunas**	Kovas Kaunas	KSS Telšiai
1939–40	Competition abandoned		
**World War II** (1st Soviet and German Occupations)
1941	Competition not finished due to World War II (Spartakas Kaunas had the best record)		
1942	**LFLS Kaunas**	MSK Panevėžys	Gubernija Šiauliai / LFLS Vilnius
1942–43	**Tauras Kaunas**	MSK Panevėžys	Gubernija Šiauliai / LGSF Vilnius
1943–44	Competition not finished due to World War II (Tauras Kaunas had the best record)		

Note: In 1924–1930, 1935, 1942, 1942–1943 and 1945 seasons there was no unified league and winners were decided using either a play–off format or a single game between winners of separate divisions.

==== Performance by club ====
Club	Winner	Runner-up	3rd	Winning seasons
Kovas Kaunas	6	4	1	1924, 1925, 1926, 1933, 1935, 1936
KSS Klaipėda	6	3	1	1928, 1929, 1930, 1931, 1937, 1937–38
LFLS Kaunas	5	6	2	1922, 1923, 1927, 1932, 1942
LGSF Kaunas	1	1	4	1938–39
MSK Kaunas	1	–	–	1934
Tauras Kaunas	1	–	–	1942–43

All champions from this period are defunct.

=== Post-War period and the Lithuanian SSR Championship ===
During the Lithuania's Soviet occupation, each soviet republic ran their separate football championship. The clubs could either participate in the competition of the soviet republic, or in the Soviet Union football league system.

==== Seasons ====
Season	Winner	Runner-up	Third place	Top scorer (Team)	Goals
1945	Spartakas Kaunas	Dinamo Vilnius	Sodyba Klaipėda / Spartakas Šiauliai	?	
1946	Dinamo Kaunas	Spartakas Kaunas	Lokomotyvas Panevėžys	?	
1947	Lokomotyvas Kaunas	Spartakas Šiauliai	Žalgiris Klaipėda	?	
1948	Elnias Šiauliai	Žalgiris Tauragė	Spartakas Vilnius	?	
1949	Elnias Šiauliai	Inkaras Kaunas	Vėliava Šiauliai	?	
1950	Inkaras Kaunas	Elnias Šiauliai	Audra Klaipėda	?	
1951	Inkaras Kaunas	Elnias Šiauliai	Audiniai Kaunas	?	
1952	Karininkų Namai Vilnius	Inkaras Kaunas	Elnias Šiauliai	?	
1953	Elnias Šiauliai	Inkaras Kaunas	Lima Kaunas	?	
1954	Inkaras Kaunas	Lima Kaunas	Elnias Šiauliai	?	
1955	Lima Kaunas	Raudonasis Spalis Kaunas	Elfa Vilnius	?	
1956	Linų Audiniai Plungė	Elnias Šiauliai	MSK Panevėžys	(Lithuanian Soviet Socialist Republic) Algimantas Lucinavičius (MSK Panevėžys)	28
1957	Elnias Šiauliai	Inkaras Kaunas	Linų Audiniai Plungė	(Lithuanian Soviet Socialist Republic) Petras Škėlovas (Raudonasis Spalis Kaunas)	22
1958	Elnias Šiauliai	Raudonoji Žvaigždė Vilnius	Spartakas Vilnius	(Lithuanian Soviet Socialist Republic) Petras Škėlovas (Raudonasis Spalis Kaunas)	11
1958–59	Raudonoji Žvaigždė Vilnius	KKI Kaunas	Elnias Šiauliai	?	
1959–60	Elnias Šiauliai	Raudonoji Žvaigždė Vilnius	Linų Audiniai Plungė	(Lithuanian Soviet Socialist Republic) Raimondas Prikockis (Elnias Šiauliai) (Lithuanian Soviet Socialist Republic) A. Stankevičius (Spartakas-2 Vilnius)	15
1960–61	Elnias Šiauliai	Baltija Klaipėda	Inkaras Kaunas	(Lithuanian Soviet Socialist Republic) Algimantas Lucinavičius (Laisvė Kretinga)	22
1961–62	FK Atletas Kaunas	Granitas Klaipėda	Inkaras Kaunas	(Lithuanian Soviet Socialist Republic) Romualdas Kazlauskas (MSK Panevėžys)	22
1962–63	Statyba Panevėžys	Politechnika Kaunas	Inkaras Kaunas	(Lithuanian Soviet Socialist Republic) Vytautas Juknys (Politechnika Kaunas)	23
1964	Inkaras Kaunas	Statyba Panevėžys	FK Minija Kretinga	(Lithuanian Soviet Socialist Republic) Petras Siniakovas (Inkaras Kaunas)	26
1965	Inkaras Kaunas	Saliutas Vilnius	Statyba Panevėžys	(Lithuanian Soviet Socialist Republic) Petras Siniakovas (Inkaras Kaunas)	26
1966	Nevėžis Kėdainiai	Statybininkas Šiauliai	Saliutas Vilnius	(Lithuanian Soviet Socialist Republic) Petras Siniakovas (Inkaras Kaunas)	19
1967	Saliutas Vilnius	Inkaras Kaunas	Nevėžis Kėdainiai	(Lithuanian Soviet Socialist Republic) S. Kuncevičius (Žalgiris Naujoji Vilnia) (Lithuanian Soviet Socialist Republic) J. Mėlinauskas (Inkaras Kaunas) (Lithuanian Soviet Socialist Republic) Kornelijus Skeivys (Statybininkas Šiauliai) (Lithuanian Soviet Socialist Republic) Romas Skeivys (Statybininkas Šiauliai)	13
1968	Statyba Panevėžys	Nevėžis Kėdainiai	Statybininkas Šiauliai	(Lithuanian Soviet Socialist Republic) Romas Jokubaitis (Statyba Panevėžys)	18
1969	Statybininkas Šiauliai	Nevėžis Kėdainiai	Inkaras Kaunas	(Lithuanian Soviet Socialist Republic) V. Paura (Nevėžis Kėdainiai)	17
1970	FK Atletas Kaunas	Politechnika Kaunas	Nevėžis Kėdainiai	(Lithuanian Soviet Socialist Republic) Vytautas Dirmeikis (FK Atletas Kaunas)	20
1971	Pažanga Vilnius	Atlantas Klaipėda	Vienybė Ukmergė	(Lithuanian Soviet Socialist Republic) R. Daunoravičius (Vienybė Ukmergė) (Lithuanian Soviet Socialist Republic) E. Milius (FK Minija Kretinga)	13
1972	Nevėžis Kėdainiai	Pažanga Vilnius	Dainava Alytus	(Lithuanian Soviet Socialist Republic) R. Balčiūnas (Pažanga Vilnius)	13
1973	Nevėžis Kėdainiai	Atlantas Klaipėda	Dainava Alytus	?	
1974	Tauras Šiauliai	Vienybė Ukmergė	Atmosfera Mažeikiai	(Lithuanian Soviet Socialist Republic) R. Daunoravičius (Vienybė Ukmergė)	20
1975	Dainava Alytus	Pažanga Vilnius	Sūduva Kapsukas	(Lithuanian Soviet Socialist Republic) Eugenijus Kurguznikovas (Sūduva Kapsukas) (Lithuanian Soviet Socialist Republic) V. Ščerbakovas (Atletas Kaunas)	17
1976	Atmosfera Mažeikiai	Vienybė Ukmergė	Pažanga Vilnius	?	
1977	Statybininkas Šiauliai	Kelininkas Kaunas	Atmosfera Mažeikiai	(Lithuanian Soviet Socialist Republic) R. Daunoravičius (Vienybė Ukmergė) (Lithuanian Soviet Socialist Republic) Romas Šiaulys (Atmosfera Mažeikiai)	15
1978	Atlantas Klaipėda	Statybininkas Šiauliai	Banga Kaunas	(Lithuanian Soviet Socialist Republic) R. Nausėda (Atletas Kaunas)	13
1979	Atmosfera Mažeikiai	Kelininkas Kaunas	Nevėžis Kėdainiai	?	
1980	Atlantas Klaipėda	Tauras Šiauliai	Politechnika Kaunas	(Lithuanian Soviet Socialist Republic) Edvardas Maliauskas (Atlantas Klaipėda)	16
1981	Atlantas Klaipėda	Kelininkas Kaunas	Pažanga Vilnius	(Lithuanian Soviet Socialist Republic) Vitalijus Stankevičius (Inkaras Kaunas)	21
1982	Pažanga Vilnius	Atlantas Klaipėda	Tauras Šiauliai	(Lithuanian Soviet Socialist Republic) Edvardas Maliauskas (Atlantas Klaipėda)	17
1983	Pažanga Vilnius	Atlantas Klaipėda	Tauras Šiauliai	(Lithuanian Soviet Socialist Republic) Rimantas Viktoravičius (Tauras Šiauliai)	21
1984	Atlantas Klaipėda	Ekranas Panevėžys	SRT Vilnius	(Lithuanian Soviet Socialist Republic) Jurijus Gordejevas (Atlantas Klaipėda)	17
1985	Ekranas Panevėžys	Atlantas Klaipėda	SRT Vilnius	(Lithuanian Soviet Socialist Republic) K. Valantiejus (SRT Vilnius)	16
1986	Banga Kaunas	Atlantas Klaipėda	Ekranas Panevėžys	(Lithuanian Soviet Socialist Republic) G. Anilionis (Banga Kaunas)	17
1987	Tauras Tauragė	SRT Vilnius	Inkaras Kaunas	(Lithuanian Soviet Socialist Republic) Jurijus Gordejevas (SRT Vilnius)	23
1988	SRT Vilnius	Inkaras Kaunas	Ekranas Panevėžys	(Lithuanian Soviet Socialist Republic) Remigijus Bubliauskas (Tauras Tauragė) (Lithuanian Soviet Socialist Republic) Jurijus Gordejevas (SRT Vilnius) (Lithuanian Soviet Socialist Republic) Saulius Vertelis (Atmosfera Mažeikiai)	20
1989	Banga Kaunas	Ekranas Panevėžys	Sirijus Klaipėda	(Lithuanian Soviet Socialist Republic) A. Vertelis (Atmosfera Mažeikiai)	17
Transitional competitions in 1990 included "Baltic League"
1990	Sirijus Klaipėda	Ekranas Panevėžys	Žalgiris Vilnius	(Lithuania) Dalius Bajorūnas (Tauras Šiauliai)	22

Note: The biggest and most notable clubs, such as Žalgiris Vilnius played in Soviet Union's Football Premier League instead of Lithuanian SSR Divisions.

==== Performance by club ====
Club	Winner	Runner-up	3rd	Winning seasons
Elnias Šiauliai^{†}	7	3	3	1948, 1949, 1953, 1957, 1958, 1959–60, 1960–61
Inkaras Kaunas^{†}	5	6	5	1950, 1951, 1954, 1964, 1965
Atlantas Klaipėda^{†}	4	7	-	1978, 1980, 1981, 1984
Karininkų Namai / Raudonoji Žvaigždė / Saliutas Vilnius^{†}	3	3	1	1952, 1958–59, 1967
Nevėžis Kėdainiai	3	2	3	1966, 1972, 1973
Pažanga Vilnius^{†}	3	2	2	1971, 1982, 1983
Statybininkas Šiauliai^{†}	2	2	1	1969, 1977
Statyba Panevėžys^{†}	2	1	3	1962–63, 1968
FK Atletas Kaunas^{†}	2	1	-	1961–62, 1970
Atmosfera Mažeikiai^{†}	2	-	2	1976, 1979
Banga Kaunas^{†}	2	-	1	1986, 1989
Ekranas Panevėžys	1	2	2	1985
Tauras Šiauliai^{†}	1	1	2	1974
SRT Vilnius^{†}	1	1	2	1988
Lima Kaunas^{†}	1	1	1	1955
Spartakas Kaunas^{†}	1	1	-	1945
Tauras Tauragė	1	1	-	1987
Linų Audiniai Plungė	1	-	2	1956
Dainava Alytus	1	-	2	1975
Dinamo Kaunas^{†}	1	-	-	1946
Lokomotyvas Kaunas^{†}	1	-	-	1947

Clubs currently playing in A Lyga are written in Bold.
^{†} - Defunct clubs.

=== Regained Independence and the A Lyga - present ===
As Lithuania regained the independence in 1991, the Lithuanian Football Federation (LFF) was re-established, and A Lyga was shaped same year. The Soviet football divisions dissolved, and the teams that participated in them returned to the Lithuania's national championship.

== List of champions (1991–present) ==
=== Seasons ===
Season	Winner	Runner-up	Third place	Top scorer (Team)	Goals
1991	Žalgiris Vilnius	Lietuvos Makabi Vilnius	Banga Kaunas	(Lithuania) Egidijus Meidus (Vilija Kaunas)	13
1991–92	Žalgiris Vilnius	Panerys Vilnius	Sirijus Klaipėda	(Lithuania) Remigijus Pocius (Granitas Klaipėda & Sakalas Šiauliai) (Lithuania) Vaidotas Šlekys (Ekranas Panevėžys)	14
1992–93	Ekranas Panevėžys	Žalgiris Vilnius	Panerys Vilnius	(Lithuania) Vaidotas Šlekys (Ekranas Panevėžys)	16
1993–94	ROMAR	Žalgiris-EBSW Vilnius	Ekranas Panevėžys	(Lithuania) Vaidotas Šlekys (Ekranas Panevėžys) (Lithuania) Robertas Žalys (FBK Kaunas)	16
1994–95	Inkaras-Grifas Kaunas	Žalgiris-EBSW Vilnius	ROMAR Mažeikiai	(Lithuania) Eimantas Poderis (Žalgiris Vilnius & Inkaras Kaunas)	24
1995–96	Inkaras-Grifas Kaunas	Kareda-Sakalas Šiauliai	Žalgiris Vilnius	(Lithuania) Edgaras Jankauskas (Žalgiris Vilnius)	25
1996–97	Kareda Šiauliai	Žalgiris Vilnius	Inkaras-Grifas Kaunas	(Lithuania) Remigijus Pocius (Kareda Šiauliai)	14
1997–98	Kareda Šiauliai	Žalgiris Vilnius	Ekranas Panevėžys	(Lithuania) Vidas Dančenka (Kareda Šiauliai)	26
1998–99	Žalgiris Vilnius	Kareda Šiauliai	FBK Kaunas	(Lithuania) Artūras Fomenka (Kareda Šiauliai)	14
1999	Žalgiris Kaunas	Žalgiris Vilnius	Atlantas Klaipėda	(Lithuania) Nerijus Vasiliauskas (Žalgiris Vilnius)	10
2000	FBK Kaunas	Žalgiris Vilnius	Atlantas Klaipėda	(Lithuania) Andrius Velička (FBK Kaunas)	26
2001	FBK Kaunas	Atlantas Klaipėda	Žalgiris Vilnius	(Lithuania) Remigijus Pocius (FBK Kaunas)	22
2002	FBK Kaunas	Atlantas Klaipėda	Ekranas Panevėžys	(Lithuania) Audrius Šlekys (FBK Kaunas)	19
2003	FBK Kaunas	Ekranas Panevėžys	Vėtra Rūdiškės	(Lithuania) Ričardas Beniušis (Atlantas Klaipėda & FBK Kaunas)	16
2004	FBK Kaunas	Ekranas Panevėžys	Atlantas Klaipėda	(Lithuania) Povilas Lukšys (Ekranas Panevėžys)	19
2005	Ekranas Panevėžys	FBK Kaunas	Sūduva Marijampolė	(Lithuania) Mantas Savėnas (Ekranas Panevėžys)	27
2006	FBK Kaunas	Ekranas Panevėžys	Vėtra Vilnius	(Ukraine) Serhiy Kuznetsov (Vėtra Vilnius)	18
2007	FBK Kaunas	Sūduva Marijampolė	Ekranas Panevėžys	(Lithuania) Povilas Lukšys (Ekranas Panevėžys)	26
2008	Ekranas Panevėžys	FBK Kaunas	Vėtra Vilnius	(Brazil) Rafael Ledesma (FBK Kaunas)	14
2009	Ekranas Panevėžys	Vėtra Vilnius	Sūduva Marijampolė	(Lithuania) Valdas Trakys (Ekranas Panevėžys)	20
2010	Ekranas Panevėžys	Sūduva Marijampolė	Žalgiris Vilnius	(Lithuania) Povilas Lukšys (Sūduva Marijampolė)	16
2011	Ekranas Panevėžys	Žalgiris Vilnius	Sūduva Marijampolė	(Lithuania) Deivydas Matulevičius (Žalgiris Vilnius)	19
2012	Ekranas Panevėžys	Žalgiris Vilnius	Sūduva Marijampolė	(Lithuania) Artūras Rimkevičius (Šiauliai)	35
2013	Žalgiris Vilnius	Atlantas Klaipėda	Ekranas Panevėžys	(Lithuania) Nerijus Valskis (Sūduva Marijampolė)	27
2014	Žalgiris Vilnius	Kruoja Pakruojis	Atlantas Klaipėda	(Croatia) Niko Tokić (Šiauliai)	19
2015	Žalgiris Vilnius	Trakai	Atlantas Klaipėda	(Lithuania) Tomas Radzinevičius (Sūduva)	28
2016	Žalgiris Vilnius	Trakai	Sūduva Marijampolė	(Serbia) Andrija Kaluđerović (Žalgiris)	20
2017	Sūduva Marijampolė	Žalgiris Vilnius	Trakai	(Lithuania) Darvydas Šernas (Žalgiris)	18
2018	Sūduva Marijampolė	Žalgiris Vilnius	Trakai	(Romania) Liviu Antal (Žalgiris)	23
2019	Sūduva Marijampolė	Žalgiris Vilnius	Riteriai	(Croatia) Tomislav Kiš (Žalgiris)	27
2020	Žalgiris Vilnius	Sūduva Marijampolė	Kauno Žalgiris	(France) Hugo Videmont (Žalgiris)	13
2021	Žalgiris Vilnius	Sūduva Marijampolė	Kauno Žalgiris	(France) Hugo Videmont (Žalgiris)	17
2022	Žalgiris Vilnius	Kauno Žalgiris	Panevėžys	(Brazil) Renan Oliveira (Žalgiris)	17
2023	Panevėžys	Žalgiris Vilnius	FA Šiauliai	(Nigeria) Mathias Oyewusi (Žalgiris)	19
2024	Žalgiris Vilnius	Hegelmann	Kauno Žalgiris	(Romania) Liviu Antal (Žalgiris)	20
2025	Kauno Žalgiris	Hegelmann	Žalgiris Vilnius	(Lithuania) Eligijus Jankauskas (FA Šiauliai)	18
2026	Kauno Žalgiris	Sūduva Marijampolė	Žalgiris Vilnius	(Spain) Xabi Auzmendi (TransInvest)	14

=== Performance by club ===
Club	Winner	Runner-up	3rd	Winning seasons
**Žalgiris Vilnius**	11	13	5	1991, 1991–92, 1998–99, 2013, 2014, 2015, 2016, 2020, 2021, 2022, 2024
FBK Kaunas^{†}	8	2	2	1999, 2000, 2001, 2002, 2003, 2004, 2006, 2007
Ekranas Panevėžys^{†}	7	4	5	1992–93, 2005, 2008, 2009, 2010, 2011, 2012
**Sūduva Marijampolė**	3	5	5	2017, 2018, 2019
Kareda Šiauliai^{†}	2	2	-	1996–97, 1997–98
**Kauno Žalgiris**	2	1	3	2025, 2026
Inkaras Kaunas^{†}	2	-	1	1994–95, 1995–96
Sirijus Klaipėda^{†}	1	-	1	1990
ROMAR Mažeikiai^{†}	1	-	1	1993–94
**Panevėžys**	1	-	1	2023

Current members club are highlighted in Bold.
^{†} - Defunct clubs.

== Top scorers ==
Player name	Goals	Clubs
Povilas Lukšys	192	Alsa Vilnius, FK Ekranas, FK Sūduva
Ričardas Beniušis	171	Inkaras Kaunas, Atlantas Klaipėda, FBK Kaunas, FK Sūduva, FK Kruoja Pakruojis
Remigijus Pocius	163	ROMAR Mažeikiai, FK Kareda, FBK Kaunas
Andrius Velička	136	FBK Kaunas, FK Ekranas, FK Žalgiris, FK Kauno Žalgiris
Tomas Radzinevičius	120	FK Sūduva
Darius Maciulevičius	114	FK Inkaras Kaunas, FBK Kaunas, FC Vilnius, FK Sūduva
Artūras Rimkevičius	109	FBK Kaunas, FK Šilutė, FK Ekranas, FK Šiauliai, FC Stumbras
Eimantas Poderis	108	Inkaras Kaunas, FBK Kaunas
Igoris Morinas	104	FK Panerys Vilnius, FK Žalgiris, FK Kruoja Pakruojis
Mantas Savėnas	103	FK Ekranas

== Most appearances ==
Player name	Appearances	Clubs
Robertas Vėževičius	412	FK Vėtra, FC Šiauliai, FK Kruoja, FC Stumbras, FK Atlantas, FK Sūduva, FK Banga
Vaidas Slavickas	381	FK Ekranas, FK Sūduva
