= LGSF Kaunas =

- Full name: Lietuvos gimnastikos ir sporto federacija
- Founded: 1927
- Dissolved: 1944
- League: Lithuanian football championship

LGSF Kaunas (English: Lithuanian gymnastics and sports federation) was a Lithuanian football club from Kaunas. It was one of the most successful football clubs from Kaunas during interbellum.

== History ==
LGSF was founded on May 17, 1922, by physical education worker Karolis Dineika and professor Juozas Eretas. It was a club that was cultivated by Lithuanian Christian Democrats party. Its basis was Ateitininkai and Pavasarininkai sports sections and independent clubs. Organization had over 80 sections. Until 1930 it published newspaper Jėga ir grožis ("Power and Beauty"). LGSF had strong football, basketball and track and fields teams. It was dissolved in 1944.

Football department was established only in 1927, because this game was disliked by Dineika. In that year the team started playing in B class, in 1928 it was promoted to A class. Team visited Estonia, Latvia, Poland, Netherlands. In 1939 Vilnius department was founded (LGSF Vilnius).

=== International games ===
Opponent	Result	Location	Date
(Czechoslovakia) SK České Budějovice	2–3	Lithuania	1935
(Estonia) Puhkekodu Tallinn	0–5	Tallinn	1935
JS Estonia Tallinn	2–3	Tallinn	1935
(Poland) Polonia Warsaw	2–2	Poland	1939
(Poland) YSK Brest-Litovsk	7–1	Poland	1939
(Poland) Gardin	2–4	Poland	1939
(Poland) Jagiellonia Białystok	5–0	Poland	1939
(Poland) Śmigły Wilno	5–2 and 5–2	Poland	1939

== Achievements ==
- Lithuanian Championship
  - Winners (1): 1938–1939
  - Runners-up (1): 1937–1938
  - Third places (4): 1932, 1933, 1934, 1936
- Runner-up of Lithuanian National Olympics (1938)
