= ŠŠ Kovas Kaunas =

Lithuanian football club from Kaunas

ŠŠ Kovas
- Full name: Šančių šaulių „Kovas“
- Founded: 1921
- Dissolved: 1945
- Chairman: A. Pankratovas
- League: Lithuanian football championship
Home colours	Away colours

Kovas Kaunas was a Lithuanian football club from Kaunas. It was one of the best Lithuanian football clubs during interbellum.

== History ==
Club was founded as LFLS Kaunas (Lietuvos fizinio lavinimosi sąjunga – Lithuanian physical education union) department in Šančiai by Stasys Sabaliauskas. On March 11, 1923, it was renamed "Kovas". It has also played against Latvian, Estonian, Czechoslovak, Austrian, Hungarian and other foreign teams. A. Pankratovas was the last chairman of the club. Kovas sports club also cultivated ice hockey, basketball, boxing, table-tennis and other sports. After Soviet occupation it was reformed to railwaymen team Lokomotyvas Kaunas.

=== Name history ===
- 1921 – LFLS Šančiai
- 1923 – ŠŠ Kovas Kaunas

=== International games ===
Opponent	Result	Location	Date
(Austria) Hakoah Wien	2–1	?	1928
(Czechoslovakia) SK České Budějovice	0–1	Lithuania	1935
(Hungary) Budafok Budapest	2–2	Lithuania	1935
(Nazi Germany) Preussen Gumbinnen	5–1	Kaunas	1937
(Austria) FAC Wien	1–1	Lithuania	1937
(Austria) Rapid Wien	0–0	Lithuania	1937
(Socialist Federal Republic of Yugoslavia) Jugoslavija Beograd	5–2	Lithuania	1938
(Sweden) AIK	2–5	Kaunas	1939-06-19

== Achievements ==
- Lithuanian Championship
  - Winners (6): 1924, 1925, 1926, 1933, 1935, 1936
  - Runners-up (4): 1922, 1931, 1936–1937, 1938–1939
  - Third places (1): 1923
- Final of Kooperacijos (Cooperation) Cup (1924)
