= LFLS Kaunas =

- Full name: Lietuvos fizinio lavinimosi sąjunga
- Nickname: kanarėlės (canaries)
- Founded: September 15, 1920
- Dissolved: 1945
| Home colours | Away colours |

LFLS Kaunas, or Lietuvos Fizinio Lavinimosi Sąjunga Kaunas, was a Lithuanian football club based in Kaunas in the years between World War I and World War II during Lithuania's first period of modern independence. The club was founded in 1919 and was a multicultural squad, which featured four Lithuanians, four Germans, and one player each of English, Jewish, and Serbian descent. It represented Lietuvos fizinio lavinimosi sąjunga (English: Lithuanian physical education union). The club installed the first football field and built the first stadium in Kaunas, published the first Lithuanian sports newspaper ("Lietuvos Sportas", since 1922) and established the Lithuanian football league in 1924. LFLS second team was the only Lithuanian football club's second team which played in the top division during interbellum. It even won third place in 1922.

LFLS Kaunas won four titles in the A Lyga during the interwar period, including the league's first two championships. The club won another league title in 1942, but was dissolved in 1945. It was resurrected for a short time in 1997, but soon it was dissolved again.

== International games ==
| Opponent | Result | Location | Date |
|---|---|---|---|
| (Latvia) YMCA Riga | 0:4 | Kaunas | 1922-06-08 |
| (Germany) Ostas Eydtkuhnen | 1:3 | Kaunas | 1922 |
| (Latvia) LSB Riga | 1:0 | Riga | 1922 |
| (Estonia) Tallinn JK | 1:7 | Kaunas | 1922 |
| (Latvia) Riga FK | 1:8 | Riga | 1929 |
| (Germany) VFB | 2:4 | Kaunas | 1929 |
| (Spain) Europa Barcelona | 2:4 | Kaunas | 1930 |
| (Austria) Wiener AC | 1:10 | Kaunas | 1931 |
| (Latvia) Riga Vanderer | 7:0 | Kaunas | 1934 |
| (Austria) FAC Wien | 1:1 | Lithuania | 1937 |
| (Estonia) Tallinn JK | 6:4 | Tallinn | 1937 |
| (Estonia) Sport Tallinn | 0:0 | Tallinn | 1937 |
| (Mandatory Palestine) Hapoel Eretz Israel | 1:2 | Kaunas | 1937 |

== Achievements ==
- Lithuanian Championship
  - Winners (5): 1922, 1923, 1927, 1932, 1942
  - Runners-up (6): 1928, 1929, 1930, 1933, 1934, 1936
  - Third places (2): 1924, 1936–1937
- Winner of Kooperacijos (Cooperation) Cup (1924)
- Bronze of Lithuanian National Olympics (1938)

== Sources ==
- Algird Fugalewitsch, Eine vergleichende Darstellung der deutschen Sportvereine des Memelgebietes und den Sportvereinen der deutschen Minderheit in Litauen von 1918 bis 1945 (A Comparative Study of German Sport Associations of the Baltics and of the German Minority in Lithuania from 1918 to 1945), Master's Thesis for Christian Albrechts University, Kiel, Germany (1995).
