= FK Saliutas Vilnius =

Saliutas Vilnius
- Full name: FK Saliutas Vilnius
- Founded: 1945
- Dissolved: 1968
- League: Lithuanian SSR Top League

Saliutas Vilnius was a Lithuanian football club from Vilnius.

== History ==
The club, originally called Karininkų Namai, was founded in 1945 as military officers team. In 1951 it was renamed Saliutas, but in 1952 it became Karininkų Namai again. In that year, it won the Lithuanian SSR Top League and the Lithuanian Cup (Tiesa Cup). It also played in the Soviet Cup, where it beat Burevestnik Kisinev (0:0 and 1:0), Dinamo Frunze (walkover), and in eight-final lost to FC Dynamo Moscow (1:4). In 1956, The team's name changed to Raudonoji Žvaigždė. In 1959, many former Spartakas Vilnius players had joined. In 1962, it was re-given the name Saliutas. The club left the Lithuanian SSR Championship in the middle of 1968 season, replaced by Pažanga Vilnius.

=== Name history ===
- 1945 – Karininkų namai (KN Vilnius) (English: Officers' house)
- 1951 – Saliutas
- 1952 – Karininkų namai
- 1956 – Raudonoji žvaigždė (English: Red Star)
- 1962 – Saliutas

== Achievements ==
- Lithuanian SSR Top League
  - Winners (3): 1952, 1958–1959, 1967
  - Runners-up (3): 1958, 1959–1960, 1965
  - Third places (1): 1966
- Lithuanian Cup (Tiesa Cup):
  - Winners (2): 1952, 1963
  - Runners-up (3): 1956, 1965, 1966
