= Elnias Šiauliai =

- Full name: FK Elnias Šiauliai
- Founded: 1947
- Dissolved: 1986
- League: Lithuanian SSR Top League
Home colours	Away colours

Elnias Šiauliai was a Lithuanian football club from Šiauliai.

== History ==
It was founded by Elnias leather and shoes factory. It was the most accomplished football club from Šiauliai during Soviet times. Elnias had the most wins (7) in Lithuanian SSR Top League (1945–1989).

== Achievements ==
- Lithuanian SSR Top League
  - Winners (7): 1948, 1949, 1953, 1957, 1958, 1959–1960, 1960–1961
  - Runners-up (3): 1950, 1951, 1956
  - Third places (3): 1952, 1954, 1958–1959
- Lithuanian Cup (Tiesa Cup):
  - Winners (3): 1950, 1957, 1959
  - Runners-up (1): 1951
- 3rd place in Baltic Radio Cup Tournament (1958)

== Managers ==
- Voldemaras Jaškevičius, 1948–1953
- A. Sipavičius, 1955–1958
- I. Urbonas, 1958–1959
- V. Šambaris, 1959–1960
- S. Rostkauskas, 1961–1965
- H. Jakimavičius, 1966–1968
- R. Jankauskas, 1969–1986
