= FK Minija Kretinga =

Lithuanian football club

FK Minija
- Full name: Football Club Minija
- Founded: 1962; 64 years ago
- Dissolved: 2016; 10 years ago
- Ground: Central Stadium of Kretinga
- Capacity: 900
- League: I Lyga
- 2016: 16th
- Website: http://www.fkminija.lt/
Home colours	Away colours

FK Minija was a Lithuanian football team from the town Kretinga.

== History ==
The club was founded in 1962. In the soviet occupation period played in "A" klasė and Aukščiausia lyga (First tier).

The best season was in 1964, when team took third place in top division. In the same year team won Lithuanian football cup.

In the Lithuanian Independence period the team was in the second or third tier.

In 2015 m. was in 16th position in Pirma lyga (second tier).

In 2016 m. had financial problems, in the squad was lot of youngsters and the team stayed at last position 16.

== Achievements ==
- A klasė
  - Third place: 1964
- Lithuanian Cup
  - Winners: 1964

== Participation in Lithuanian Championships ==
=== Best seasons of Minija ===
Season	Level	League	Place	Weblink	Notes
1964	1.	A klasė	3.		Lithuanian Cup:
1965	1.	A klasė	10.		
1966	1.	A klasė	13.		
1967	1.	A klasė	5.		

=== Recent seasons of Minija ===
Season	Level	League	Place	Weblink	Notes
2013	3.	Antra lyga	8.		
2014	3.	Antra lyga	4.		▲ Promotion to Pirma lyga
2015	2.	Pirma lyga	16.		
2016	2.	Pirma lyga	16.		Defunct after season

== Participation in LFF Cup ==
In 2009/2010 LFF Cup season FK Minija was defeated in the third round by FK Nevėžis 1 – 5

== Squad ==
As of 5 April, 2026

Note: Flags indicate national team as defined under FIFA eligibility rules; some limited exceptions apply. Players may hold more than one non-FIFA nationality.

No.	Pos.	Nation	Player
1	GK	TUR	Daniel Ali Tek
2	GK	LTU	Vykintas Gaudiešius
3	DF	LTU	Ernestas Mockus
5	DF	LTU	Erik Kirjanov
6	MF	MLI	Mohamed Sidibe
7	FW	LTU	Julius Kasparavičius
8	MF	LTU	Deividas Pipiras
9	FW	USA	Diba Nwegbo
10	MF	KOR	Min-woo Lee
11	FW	LTU	Adrijus Putvinas
13	DF	LTU	Gustas Gumbaravičius
14	MF	EST	Nikita Komissarov
15	DF	MLI	Makan Diawara

No.	Pos.	Nation	Player
16	MF	KOR	Chang-hun Song
18	DF	JPN	Riku Takei
19	DF	LTU	Matas Keblys
20	MF	LTU	Ugnius Avizovas
21	FW	LTU	Linas Zingertas
22	GK	LTU	Aleksas Pipiras
23	DF	LTU	Jurgis Jankauskas
26	MF	LTU	Natas Genutis
27	MF	LTU	Sergej Amirzian
32	FW	JPN	Kentaro Oikawa
43	DF	MLI	Bekaye Diawara
45	FW	NGA	Kazeem Aderounmu
