= FK Mažeikiai =

Lithuanian football club

- Full name: Mažeikių futbolo klubas
- Founded: 1995; 31 years ago (refounded, as Mažeikiai)
- Dissolved: 2011; 15 years ago
- Ground: Mažeikių sporto centro stadionas, Mažeikiai
- Capacity: 2,400
Home colours	Away colours

FK Mažeikiai was a Lithuanian football club from city of Mažeikiai.

== History ==
In 1992, the club ROMAR Mažeikiai was founded in Mažeikiai – an acronym for Romas Marcinkevičius, the main investor of the club. In 1993, ROMAR finished the league in sixth position, and in the 1993–94 A Lyga season, it won the Lithuanian championship. In 1995, Romar finished in third position, but because of a financial problems, the club was expelled from the top division.

After the dissolvement of ROMAR, FK Mažeikiai was founded as a phoenix club. It played in lower divisions for most of its existence, but at the end of the 2009 season, the club was promoted to the A lyga. In the Lithuanian top division, they reached the ninth place in both the 2010 and 2011 seasons. However, the club had serious financial problems and was dissolved following the 2011 season.

FK Atmosfera (2012) emerged as a phoenix club.

== Name ==
During its history, the club has changed its name several times:

- 1961 – ETG Mažeikiai
- 1962 – Elektra Mažeikiai
- 1973 – Atmosfera Mažeikiai
- 1990 – Jovaras Mažeikiai
- 1992 – FK Mažeikiai
- 1992 – ROMAR Mažeikiai (new club)
- 1995 – FK Mažeikiai
- 2001 – Nafta Mažeikiai
- 2003 – FK Mažeikiai

== Participation in Lithuanian Championships ==
- 2011 – 9th (A lyga)
- 2010 – 9th (A lyga)
- 2009 – 3rd (1 Lyga)
- 2008 – 1st (2 Lyga West)
- 2007 – 4th (2 Lyga North)
- 2006 – 3rd (2 Lyga North)
- 2005 – 4th (2 Lyga North)
