= Statyba Panevėžys =

- Full name: FK Statyba Panevėžys
- Founded: 1935
- Dissolved: 1977
- Ground: Panevėžys
- League: Lithuanian football championship, Lithuanian SSR Top League
| Home colours | Away colours |

Statyba Panevėžys was a Lithuanian football club from Panevėžys.

== History ==
It was founded as Maisto sporto klubas (MSK) (English: Food Sports Club). In 1962 it was taken over by Panevėžio statybos trestas (English: Panevėžys Construction Trust), and because of that it was renamed "Statyba" (English: Construction). It was dissolved in 1977.

=== Name history ===
- 1935 – MSK Panevėžys
- 1946 – Lokomotyvas Panevėžys
- 1947 – Žalgiris Panevėžys
- 1954 – MSK (Maistas) Panevėžys
- 1962 – Statyba Panevėžys

== Achievements ==
- Lithuanian Championship/LSSR Top League
  - Winners (2): 1962–63, 1968
  - Runners-up (3): 1942, 1942–1943, 1964
  - Third places (3): 1946, 1956, 1965
- Lithuanian Cup (Tiesa Cup):
  - Runners-up (3): 1957, 1967, 1971
