= FK Atletas Kaunas =

- Full name: Kauno futbolo klubas „Atletas“
- Founded: 2005
- Dissolved: 2013
- Ground: Kaunas LŽŪU stadium, Kaunas
- Capacity: 1.000
Home colours	Away colours

FK Atletas Kaunas (formerly LKKA ir Teledema) was a Lithuanian football club from the city of Kaunas. The majority of the players was recruited from the Lithuanian Academy of Physical Education. LKKA ir Teledema earned promotion to the A Lyga, Lithuania's top football division, for the 2009 season after FBK Kaunas and Atlantas Klaipėda voluntarily withdrew their participation. The team played in the A Lyga for the first time in the club's history.
