= FK Inkaras Kaunas =

FK Inkaras
- Full name: Futbolo Klubas Inkaras Kaunas
- Founded: 1937; 89 years ago
- Dissolved: 2003; 23 years ago

FK Inkaras Kaunas was a Lithuanian football team from the city of Kaunas. It was founded in 1937 and dissolved in 2003.

== Achievements ==
- A Lyga: 2

1995, 1996

- Lithuanian SSR Championship: 5

1950, 1951, 1954, 1964, 1965

- Lithuanian Cup: 7

1948, 1949, 1951, 1954, 1965, 1969, 1995

- Lithuanian Supercup: 1

1995

== Season-by-season ==
Lithuania

Season	Div.	Pos.	Pl.	W	D	L	Goals	P	Top Scorer	Cup	Europe	
1991	1st	14	14	2	4	8	7–15	8		1/8		
1991–92	1st	10	25	6	6	13	23–28	18		1/8		
1992–93	1st	9	23	8	6	9	28–28	22		1/8		
1993–94	1st	8	22	4	8	10	22–34	16		1/8		
1994–95	1st	1	22	16	4	2	50–12	32		Winner		
1995–96	1st	1	28	24	3	1	67–9	56		Final	UC	Preliminary round
1996–97	1st	3	28	15	8	5	41–19	53		Final	UC	Preliminary round
1997–98	1st	4	30	19	4	7	60–22	61		1/8	UC	1st qualifying round
1998–99	1st	5	23	11	4	8	34–27	37		1/4	IC	2nd Round
1999	1st	6	18	8	5	5	25–18	29		1/2		
2000	1st	9	36	5	6	25	28–95	21		1/4		
2001	1st	5	36	11	12	13	50–44	45		1/4		
2002	1st	5	32	13	7	12	35–29	41		1/2		

== European cup history ==
Season	Competition	Round	Club	Home	Away	Aggregate	Scored
1995–96	UEFA cup	Preliminary round	(Denmark) Brøndby	0–3	0–3	0–6	
1996–97	UEFA cup	Preliminary round	(Bulgaria) Slavia	1–1	3–4	4–5	
1997–98	UEFA cup	1st qualifying round	(Czech Republic) Boby Brno	3–1	1–6	4–7	
1998–99	Intertoto Cup	1st Round	(Azerbaijan) Bakı Fahlasi	1–0	0–1	1–1 (5–4 pen.)	
		2nd Round	(Germany) Werder	0–1	1–4	1–5	
