= Polish autonomy in the Vilnius Region =

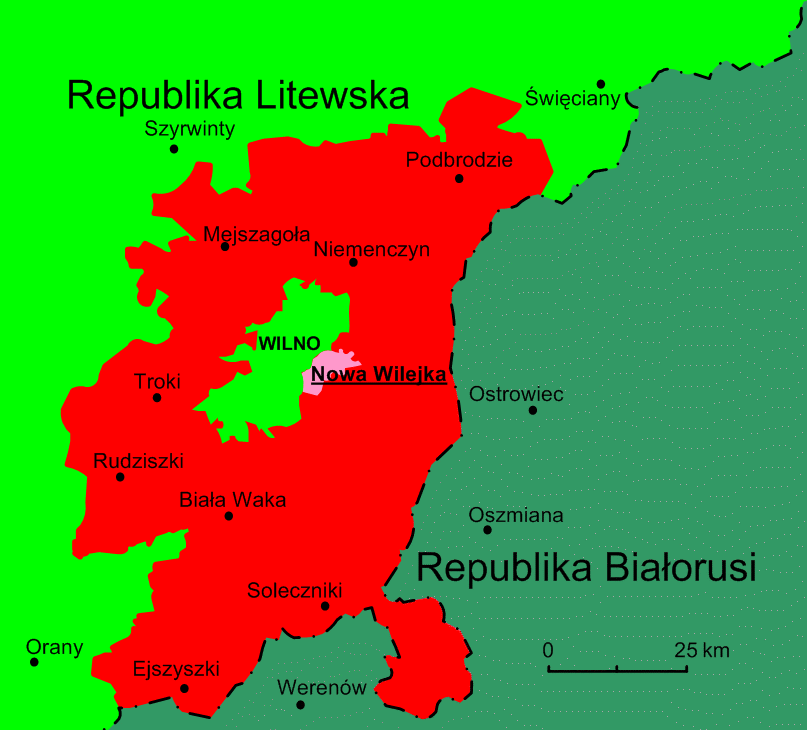
Map showing territory of Polish autonomy in the Vilnius Region

Polish autonomy in the Vilnius Region (Polish: Autonomia Wileńszczyzny; Lithuanian: Vilniaus krašto autonomija) was an idea about a politically autonomous territorial unit for Poles in Lithuania, which began to be discussed in autumn 1988, when Lithuania was regaining its independence from the Soviet Union. As a result of perestroika, under the influence of their own national revival, and also fearing an attempt at Lithuanianization in independent Lithuania, Poles in Lithuania attempted to protect their own cultural identity by establishing autonomy. According to the Polish sociologist Adam Bobryk, this project never gained full support from the Lithuanian authorities, nor was implemented unilaterally by the Poles. The project was subject to several years of discussion and design work in 1988–1991, various groups of the Polish minority differed about its ultimate shape, basically agreeing only that autonomy should cover areas where Poles are the majority, and the Polish language should be given equal status.

On 6 and 15 September 1989, the Šalčininkai and Vilnius municipalities, respectively, declared themselves to be self-governing national territorial districts within the Lithuanian SSR, where Russian, Polish and Lithuanian languages had equal status. Following the re-establishment of Lithuanian independence on 11 March 1990, the Šalčininkai municipality adopted a declaration on 15 May 1990 which stated that the restoration of Lithuanian independence was invalid and that the Lithuanian SSR continues to be a part of the USSR. The closest to its creation was in October 1990, with the adoption by the congress of Polish delegates in Eišiškės of a declaration creating the Polish National-Territorial Region. The declaration was sent to the Lithuanian Parliament for approval, where it was denied by the Lithuanian authorities, who partially accepted Polish demands with the amendment of the Minorities Act on 29 January 1991, which make changes in the fields of language and education, and promised a new administrative division that would take national divisions into account. The latter postulate was never realized. Works on autonomy were continued at the congress in Mostiškės on 22 May 1991, where the deputies agreed on the basic principles of the autonomy system. The attempt to create a Polish autonomy collapsed together with the failed 1991 Soviet coup attempt, because its main supporters, the hard-line Soviet Communists, were defeated. After Lithuania actually regained its independence on 4 September 1991, it suppressed the movement and dissolved the district councils of Vilnius and Šalčininkai.

== Background ==
From 1922 to 1939 Vilnius and its region were part of the Second Polish Republic as the Wilno voivodeship, succeeding the short-lived Polish puppet state of Central Lithuania. During World War II, they briefly returned to Lithuania, but Lithuania was twice occupied by the Soviet Union and once by Nazi Germany. During 1944–1989, these areas were in the Lithuanian Soviet Socialist Republic, part of the USSR, as a result of territorial changes after World War II, but the Vilnius and Šalčininkai districts became isolated from the republic's social and cultural life. This was a result of not only the region's complicated demographic situation, but also by Moscow's specific policy towards the Lithuanian Poles. The Polish historian Krzysztof Buchowski has written: "The Soviet authorities successfully applied the tactic of 'divide and rule' in this case... Time has shown that the tactic was effective." For example, Moscow closed down almost all Lithuanian schools in the two districts in 1950–1955, while Polish schools were established instead of the Lithuanian ones. Lithuanian language was practically not taught in Polish schools.

In two waves of emigration in the years 1945–47 and 1956–1959, at least 243,708 people left for Poland, mainly city dwellers, intellectuals and wealthy peasants. A similar number of people of Polish nationality remained on the territory of Lithuania. Many immigrated from the rest of the Soviet Union to replace those, who left, mainly from the Byelorussian SSR, they were attracted by the possibility of better living conditions. This included Poles from Belarus. As a result of these changes, Poles became a minority, consisting mainly of people with a lower social status, with a low rate of people with higher education, but a high rate of manual workers. Hence, the newcomers were generally the party and economic leaders of these districts. In 1989, Poles made up 7% of Lithuania's population (all national minorities combined 20.4%). Despite the initial attempts Lithuanisation of the Polish population was largely fruitless, but significant portion of Poles became Russified. While in 1959 96.4% of Poles indicated Polish as their native language, in 1989 it was 85%. In 1989, 58% of Poles declared knowledge of Russian as a second language, and only 15.6% of Lithuanian. Nevertheless, 59% of them declared acceptance of using Lithuanian as an official language, while only 8% were in favor of Russian.

According to the historian Alfred E. Senn, the Polish minority was divided into three main groups: Vilnius' inhabitants supported Lithuanian independence, the residents of the southeastern part of Vilnius district and Šalčininkai district were pro-Soviet, while the third group scattered throughout the country did not have a clear position. According to surveys from the spring of 1990, 47% of Poles in Lithuania supported the pro-Soviet Communist party (in contrast to 8% support among ethnic Lithuanians), while 35% supported Lithuanian independence.

When Lithuania started the process of regaining its independence from the Soviet Union in 1988 large part of the Polish minority, still remembering the 1950s attempts to ban Polish, was afraid that the independent Lithuanian government might want to reintroduce the Lithuanization policies. Furthermore, some Lithuanian nationalists, notably the Vilnija organization, founded in 1988, viewed eastern Lithuania's inhabitants as Polonized Lithuanians. Many Poles in Lithuania undoubtedly do have Lithuanian ancestry. Because these Lithuanian nationalists viewed ethnicity as primordial, they argued that the Lithuanian state should work to restore their "true" identity. The pseudoscientific theory of the existence of a separate ethnic group, the so-called "vičuv Litevskich", i.e. descendants of the polonized Lithuanian nobles. The surname ending in -wicz was supposed to prove belonging to the group. These views were disseminated with the passivity of Sąjūdis, also by members of this organization.

There were no formalized political divisions among the activists of the Polish minority. In fact, the only Polish organization undertaking political activity in the first years of independent Lithuania was the Union of Poles in Lithuania (ZPL), established in 1989. In some way, all the activists of the Polish minority were connected with it. An important body, however, formed only on 23 October, was the Polish Parliamentary Faction, grouping Polish deputies to the Supreme Council of Lithuania. The ZPL as a whole basically stood for the establishment of limited territorial autonomy within the framework of independent Lithuania. Within the ZPL, there was also a group of activists who advocated for the aggremment with Lithuanian government, did not raise the topic of territorial autonomy, but rather opted for local government with extended competences. Representatives of this group were, for example, Sąjūdis activist Czesław Okińczyc and Zbigniew Balcewicz. There was also a radical group, represented by Jan Ciechanowicz, which sought fait accompli, and resorted to the help of the central Soviet authorities. In this group there were even ideas of separating the Vilnius region, either as an independent entity or within the framework of the USSR. Such radical tendencies were manifested also by group of Polish activists who were also members of the Communist Party, such as Czesław Wysocki from Šalčininkai. The moderate group, which was somewhere in between those two, was represented by the first president of ZPL, Jan Sienkiewicz.

== History ==
=== Beginning of the autonomous movement ===
On 6 October 1988, the Presidium of the Supreme Soviet of the Lithuanian Soviet Socialist Republic adopted Lithuanian as the sole state language. Nine municipal councils (Avižieniai, Buivydžiai, Grigaičiai, Lavoriškės, Medininkai, Mickūnai, Sudervė, Nemenčinė, Rudamina) issued a protest against this and wanted bilingualism, but the protest was ignored. On 25 January 1989, the Language Law was adopted. According to its enterprises, organizations and institutions were obliged to switch to Lithuanian within two years. As Lithuanian was recognized as the sole state language, toponyms in Lithuania could only be written in Lithuanian and that language had to be used at meetings of local government bodies, in courts and offices. A transitional period was provided. In response, the Rudamina municipality declared itself a Polish national municipality. This was the second such occurrence, as a month before that, on 28 December 1988 Sudervė municipality did it. Within few next months, a total of 16 out of 24 councils in the Vilnius district and 14 out of the 15 in Šalčininkai followed the suit. Meanwhile, on 23 February 1989, Mikhail Gorbachev mentioned for the first time the possibility of establishing autonomous regions within the USSR's republics in a speech in Kyiv.

During its first congress, the SSKPL transformed itself into the Union of Poles in Lithuania. On 12 May 1989, the 1st Congress of Deputies of the Vilnius Region (128 deputies representing towns: Šalčininkai, Eišiškės and Nemenčinė, and from 27 municipal councils of Šalčininkai, Vilnius and Švenčionys districts) was held in Mickūnai and decided to establish the Coordination Council for the Establishment of the Polish Autonomous Region (65 persons, with 5-person presidium).

In response, the Presidium of the Supreme Council of the LSSR issued a statement on 22 June 1989 declaring that the establishment of autonomous regions is unconstitutional. This didn't stop the Coordination Council from presenting a project of the autonomy to the LSSR Supreme Council on 12 July 1989. The projected autonomy's territory included the whole Vilnius and Šalčininkai districts, as well as municipalities in the Trakai, Švenčionys and Širvintos districts, where Poles were in the majority. The state languages were to be Lithuanian and Polish, and Russian was to be the "contact" language. On 6 September 1989, the Šalčininkai District Council declared itself the Polish National-Territorial District (50 votes "for" and 14 "against") On 15 September 1989, the district council of the Vilnius district in Nemenčinė adopted a similar resolution. On 21 September 1989, Presidium of LSSR Supreme Council cancelled both resolutions. After the declaration of Lithuanian independence on 11 March 1990, some institutions were still recognizing the supremacy of the central Soviet authorities, while some recognised the newly established Lithuanian authorities. After the local elections of 24 March 1990, the newly elected Council of the Šalčininkai District with Czesław Wysocki, a member of the Communist Party of Lithuania, declared on 15 May 1990 the district the Šalčininkai Polish National-Territorial District of the Lithuanian Soviet Socialist Republic. Under the declaration, the laws and constitution of the USSR and LSRR were to be applied in the district. On 24 May 1990, the Vilnius district council supported the decision to create a national region, but recognized by an act of 11 March that the territory of Lithuania is "integral and indivisible".

=== Eišiškės congress ===
On 1 June 1990, in the Zavišonys village, the Second Congress of Deputies of the Vilnius Region, elected new Coordinating Council, and called for creation of autonomy. On 6 October 1990, during the second round of the Congress, this time in Eišiškės, two projects clashed. First: autonomy in the nature of a self-governing territorial unit, grouping all lands with a Polish majority, proposed by Ryszard Maciejkianiec, secretary of the ZPL. And the second project (Jan Kucewicz, and Jan Ciechanowicz) was the proclamation of the Autonomous Polish Vilnius Unit with the status of a republic within the USSR. Later Ciechanowicz proposed a compromise project: the declaration of territorial autonomy as part of Lithuania. Only if this proposal was not accepted by Lithuanian authorities, the autonomy would be proclaimed as part of the USSR. If this project also failed, the autonomy would be proclaimed at the next congress as part of Poland. Proposals of Estonian and Latvian delegates for a joint Russian-Polish front in defense of socialism and the integrity of the USSR, as well as a pro-Moscow Polish military units were rejected. In the end, the third project prevailed, proposed by the president of ZPL Jan Mincewicz: the creation of the Polish National and Territorial Unit (Polish: Polski Kraj Narodowo-Terytorialny) as a part of Lithuania, A draft law on its establishment was written and sent to the Supreme Council for consideration. The proposed autonomous country was to include:

- entire Vilnius and Šalčininkai districts
- in the Švenčionys district: the town and municipality of Pabradė, and the municipality of Moguny;
- in the Trakai district: municipalities of Paluknys, Trakai, Senieji Trakai and Kariotiškės;
- in the Širvintos district: the municipality of Jauniūnai.

On 7 and 10 October 1990, councilors of the Šalčininkai and Vilnius regions adopted the congress' resolutions. The Supreme Council of the Republic of Lithuania rejected the project of autonomy for the Vilnius region, instead it solemnly commemorated the anniversaries of 9 and 28 October, that is, the Lithuanian loss of Vilnius in 1920 due to the Żeligowski Mutiny and the return of Vilnius to Lithuania in 1939. On 24 November 1990, a Congress of Representatives of Eastern Lithuania, organized mainly by the Vilnija organization, took place in Vilnius, to which Poles were not invited. The congress participants demanded, among other things, restrictions of the rights of local governments in regions inhabited by Poles and the Lithuanianization of education. Vytautas Landsbergis, Kazimira Prunskienė, and Romualdas Ozolas were present at the congress.

The situation was aggravated by the Law On Identity Cards, passed on 29 November 1990, which did not specify the spelling of names and did not include information on nationality, which was a demand of the Polish minority. In December, two Polish deputies, Jan Ciechanowicz and Alicet Brodawski, went to the Fourth Congress of People's Deputies of the Soviet Union, where they sought help in implementing the demands for autonomy. This was received in Lithuania almost as treason.

=== Attempt at compromise ===
The January Events in Lithuania triggered a wave of solidarity, with all major Polish organizations criticizing Soviet aggression. Lithuania also received support from Poland. This, as well as the fear of Soviet intervention, led to a compromise. Whose main manifestation was the amendments to the Law on National Minorities, adopted on 29 January 1991. The amendments ensured the right to full education in the mother tongue, allowed the use of the minority language on par with the state language in places where the minority was in the majority, and gave the right to national self-determination. In addition, the Supreme Council put forward a proposal to the government to start work on drafting a separate status for the Vilnius district (combining the current Vilnius and Šalčininkai districts). This was a major breakthrough and the fulfillment of a large part of the demands of the Polish minority, but many of the provisions were conditional, moreover, reluctantly introduced by those in power and government officials. Furthermore, a law was passed on 31 January 1991 that allowed data to be entered in personal identity cards only in the Lithuanian alphabet, which significantly affected the way Polish names were written.

=== Lithuanian and Soviet referendums ===
In December 1990, the authorities of the USSR ordered a referendum in which the citizens of the state were to express their opinion whether they were in favor of maintaining the renewed USSR as a federation of sovereign Soviet republics. The date was set for 17 April. The Lithuanian authorities refused to hold a referendum, instead they decided to hold a referendum on 9 February, in which Lithuanians were to answer the question: "Are you for the Lithuanian state to be an independent democratic republic?". In Lithuania as a whole, 90.47% of voters answered the question positively; in the Šalčininkai district, only 52.82% did so, in the Vilnius district 56.59%. Turnout in both regions was also lower than in the rest of the country.

In February Vilnius was visited by Oleg Shenin, a member of the Politburo of the Communist Party of the Soviet Union, who threatened that if Lithuania did not follow the Kremlin-established mechanism of secession, Lithuania might lose the territories which the Soviet Union gained in 1939 after the Soviet invasion of Poland that were later transferred to the Lithuanian SSR. He also threatened that Kremlin may defend inhabitants of "certain territories from the unilateral influence of separatist forces."

Despite warnings that such an action would be illegal, and condemnation from both the ZPL and the Parliamentary Polish Faction, the councils of the Šalčininkai and Vilnius regions organized a Soviet referendum in their areas on 17 March 1991. According to official, unreliable data, in the Šalčininkai region, with a turnout of 76%, 98.7% of voters voted in favor of preserving the reformed USSR. In the Vilnius region, where the turnout was 57.1% (or 48%), 98.1% voted that way.

=== Mostiškės congress ===
On 22 May 1991, the third round of the 2nd Congress took place in the Mostiškės village. Lithuanian politicians Vytautas Landsbergis, Romualdas Ozolas, and Vytenis Andriukaitis were present at the congress. During the meeting, a kind of constitution of Polish autonomy was adopted (195 votes "for", 6 abstained): "Draft act of the Republic of Lithuania regarding Polish national and territorial unit of Vilnius Region" (Polish: Projekt ustawy Republiki Litewskiej w sprawie kraju polskiego narodowo-terytorialnego Wileńszczyzny). The autonomy's capital was Naujoji Vilnia, the anthem was Rota by Maria Konopnicka and the Polish flag was its flag, while Lithuanian and Polish were equal as languages of the administration. Residents of the Unit retained Lithuanian citizenship and gained the right to hold Polish or USSR citizenship. The highest legislative body became the Vilnius Sejm. Which would appoint a management board with executive authority. The Lithuanian government would have the right to appoint "an authorized representative" for the district. The autonomy's area was estimated to be 4,930 square kilometers, with 215,000 inhabitants, of which 66% would be Poles.

The Lithuanian authorities were given a deadline of 3 November 1991 to accept the draft act. Acceptance of it would virtually turn Lithuanian into a federal state. In response, the Eastern Lithuania National Commission, created by the Lithuanian authorities, prepared its own project in early June: "Status of Vilnius District in the constitutional system of Lithuania." It envisioned the merger of Vilnius and Šalčininkai districts into a single Vilnius district in which "the Slavonic ethno-cultural image of Lithuania would be traditionally respected." The project envisioned education in three languages at the high school level, protection of cultural heritage and a proportional system in local elections. It contained no concessions of a political nature.

=== Suppression of the movement ===
After the fall of the coup on 22 August 1991, an independent Lithuania was internationally recognized by most countries by August 29, while the Lithuanian authorities began suppressing the Polish autonomist movement. It was accompanied by a media campaign accusing Poles of supporting the putschists. As early as August 22, the chairman of the Šalčininkai region, Czesław Wysocki, who officially supported the putschists, was suspended. He was officially dismissed from office on 3 September 1991. The region's deputies on the same day recalled Wysocki and his deputy on their own, electing their successors. Disregarding this, in violation of Lithuanian law, the Supreme Council immediately dissolved the Vilnius, Šalčininkai districts and Sniečkus city (now Visaginas) councils on 4 September. Czesław Wysocki and his deputy Adam Monkiewicz left the country. The next day, on 5 September, Poland and Lithuania established official diplomatic relations, while on 6 September the Supreme Soviet of the USSR annulled the annexation of the Baltic republics. On 12 September 1991, the government established its own administration in the Vilnius and Šalčininkai regions, appointing non-Polish speakers as commissioners. The ZPL protested the dissolution of the councils as unlawful and anti-democratic, and demanded an end to the campaign. For several years, a number of investigations were conducted against people involved in the movement for autonomy.

== Kremlin and the autonomy ==
In Lithuanian society, at that time there was a belief that the movement for autonomy was inspired from Moscow or even created by the KGB in order to limit Lithuania's aspirations to independence or detach parts of Lithuanian territory from it. Moscow sought to create a so-called 'Interfront' in Lithuania, following the example of other Baltic states, which would unite national minorities against the titular majority, in order to destabilise the country. However, these efforts were unsuccessful, Lithuania being the only Baltic country where the creation of an Interfront did not take place. On 4 November 1988, the Socialist Movement for Reconstruction in Lithuania "Vienybė/Yedinstvo/Jedność" was founded, opposing the Sąjūdis and advocating the status quo and the continued Soviet occupation of Lithuania. Despite the use of the name in three languages, it mainly represented Russians, Polish participation was small. Nevertheless, the movement used Polish slogans and rhetoric, often in an aggressive and provocative manner. It demanded the creation of a second parliamentary chamber, the Council of Nationalities, appealed to Marxism–Leninism and criticized the ZPL as insufficiently radical. ZPL never established cooperation with Yedinstvo.

Nonetheless, the autonomous movement included people who supported the Soviet system, as well as low-level activists of the communist party. Nevertheless, they were a minority, and the movement itself sought autonomy within Lithuania. The communist party showed no support for autonomous aspirations. Also, the Kremlin did not support the autonomous movement directly, apart from general declarations of support for the autonomous movements in the union republics of the USSR or instrumental attempts to put pressure on the Lithuanian authorities. The role of Oleg Shenin, a member of the Politburo of the Communist Party of the Soviet Union, whose activity was aimed at the counteraction of the opposition of the republic against the Moscow rule was important. He is known to be instrumental in establishing similar ethnic-based subdivisions elsewhere in the collapsing Soviet Union: in Moldova and Transcaucasia.

The KGB was interested in the development of the Polish autonomous movement in Lithuania and the intensification of Polish-Lithuanian antagonism. KGB files show that the ZPL's 11-member board included 3 agents, whose personalities have not been established to this day. The KGB collaborator was certainly Felix Merkulov, a Russian married to a Polish woman, who arrived in Lithuania in 1990 and became involved in Polish organizations, editing, among other things, the ephemeral magazine "Ojczyzna".

== Poland and the autonomy ==
The authorities of post-communist Poland, which originated from the Solidarity movement, essentially dissociated themselves from the autonomous movement of Poles in Lithuania. Poland's foreign policy was based on the so-called Giedroyc Doctrine, which rested on active support for the independence of the countries located between Poland and Russia, primarily Lithuania, Belarus and Ukraine. The doctrine also assumed full recognition of the borders created after World War II. With regard to Polish minorities in the east, Poland offered repatriation programs and cultural support. It did not plan to use them politically, at most as informal ambassadors mediating to foster good relations with the authorities of the countries the Poles inhabited.

Activists for Polish autonomy looked to Poland for support in their plans, primarily after the fall of the August putsch, when Moscow's ability to realistically influence the situation fell dramatically. In August 1991, a delegation from the Polish Parliamentary Faction was received in Warsaw by representatives of the Polish government, parliament and president. According to Anicet Brodawski, their demands were heard, but not supported. Instead, support was offered by Kresy organizations (Federacja Organizacji Kresowych) and small right-wing parties (Polska Partia Niepodległościowa, Partia Konserwatywna, Stronnictwo Wierności Rzeczypospolitej).

== Aftermath ==
Autonomy for the Polish minority in Lithuania after 1991 never became a serious political project again. However, the idea itself, as well as terms such as "autonomist," acquired a pejorative meaning among Lithuanian public opinion. The Law on National Minorities passed in 1989 with amendments in 1991 ceased to function in 2010. Since then, no new law has been passed. Some provisions, such as dual naming in minority-populated areas, never went into effect, as they were deemed to violate the constitution.

In 1999, convictions were handed down against those involved in the autonomy movement under Articles 67 of the Criminal Code ("actions measured against economic entities and institutions of the authorities") and 70 of the Criminal Code ("creation of an anti-state organization and active participation in it.") Former Supreme Council deputy Leon Jankielewicz was sentenced to 2.5 years in prison under Articles 67 and 70. The former deputies of the Šalčininkai Council were convicted under Article 67: Alfred Aliuk for 9 months, Jan Kucewicz for 6 months, Jan Jurołajć and Karol Bilans for one year. After a few months, the appeals court raised all the verdicts. On December 14, the Supreme Court of Lithuania reduced the sentences. Jankielewicz's sentence was reduced from 3.5 to 2 years in prison. The others received a sentence of 2 years of forced labor at their place of residence with a 20% deduction of wages. Ultimately, Jankielewicz was pardoned by President Valdas Adamkus after signing an appeal of Poles supporting Lithuania's admission to NATO.

== Bibliography ==
- Antanavičius, Ugnius (15 October 2019). "Lenkų autonominis judėjimas Lietuvoje 1988-1992 m. – kodėl jis kilo ir kaip klostėsi?" [Polish Autonomy movement in Lithuania 1988-1992 - why did it arise and how did it develop?] (in Lithuanian).
- Bobryk, Adam (2006). Odrodzenie narodowe Polaków w Republice Litewskiej 1987-1997 [Polish National Revival in the Republic of Lithuania 1987-1997] (in Polish). Toruń.
- Bobryk, Adam (2013). Społeczne znaczenie funkcjonowania polskich ugrupowań politycznych w Republice Litewskiej 1989 - 2013 [Social significance of the functioning of Polish political groups in the Republic of Lithuania 1989 - 2013] (in Polish). Siedlce.
- Bobryk, Adam (2015). "The ethnic policy of Lithuania". In Baluk, Walenty (ed.). Ethnic Policy in Contemporary East Central European Countries.
- Bobryk, Adam (2019). "Zagrożenia i aspiracje. Ruch społeczny na rzecz utworzenia autonomii polskiej na Wileńszczyźnie (1988-1991)" [Threats and aspirations. A social movement for the creation of Polish autonomy in the Vilnius region (1988-1991)]. In Lis, Wojciech (ed.). Polacy na Litwie. Przeszłość i teraźniejszość (in Polish).
- Budryte, Dovile (2005). Taming Nationalism?: Political Community Building in the Post-Soviet Baltic States. Aldershot: Ashgate Publishing. ISBN 0-7546-3757-3.
- Clemens, Walter C. (1991). Baltic Independence and Russian Empire. St. Martin's Press. p. 150. ISBN 0-312-04806-8.
- Jundo-Kaliszewska, Barbara (2019). Zakładnicy historii. Mniejszość polska w postradzieckiej Litwie [Hostages of history. The Polish minority in post-Soviet Lithuania] (in Polish). Łódź.
- Mikłaszewicz, Irena (2019). "Wybrane zagadnienia polityki władz litewskich wobec Polaków na Litwie w latach 1945-2017" [Selected issues of the policy of the Lithuanian authorities towards Poles in Lithuania in the years 1945-2017]. In Lis, Wojciech (ed.). Polacy na Litwie. Przeszłość i teraźniejszość (in Polish).
- Rudokas, Jonas (2013). "Kas ir kodėl kūrė autonomiją Vilniaus krašte 1989–1992 m." [Who and why created the autonomy in the Vilnius region in 1989–1992?]. Kultūros barai (in Lithuanian). 5. ISSN 0134-3106.
- Senn, Alfred Erich (1997). "Nationality Questions in the Baltic. The Lithuanian Example". In van Horne, Winston A. (ed.). Global Convulsions: Race, Ethnicity, and Nationalism at the End of the Twentieth Century.
- Sirutavičius, Vladas (2018). "On the Polish National and Territorial Autonomy in Lithuania (the Spring–Summer of 1991)" (PDF). Studia z Dziejów Rosji i Europy Środkowo-Wschodniej. 52 (1): 163–195. doi:10.12775/SDR.2017.EN1.06. S2CID 158682654.
- Stravinskienė, Vitalija (2008). "Lietuvių ir lenkų santykiai Rytų ir Pietryčių Lietuvoje: 1944 m. antra pusė–1953 m." [Relations between Lithuanians and Poles in Eastern and Southeastern Lithuania: late 1944–1953]. Lietuvos istorijos metraštis (in Lithuanian). 2. Vilnius. ISSN 0202-3342.
