= Čáslav (disambiguation) =

Čáslav is a town in the Czech Republic.

Čáslav may also refer to:

- FK Čáslav, football club in Čáslav
- Čáslav, a variant of Časlav (name)

== See also ==
- Čáslavsko, a municipality and village in the Czech Republic
- Čáslavice, a municipality and village in the Czech Republic
- Czesław
