= Robert Duchniewicz =

Lithuanian social democratic politician of Polish ethnicity

- Robert Duchnevič
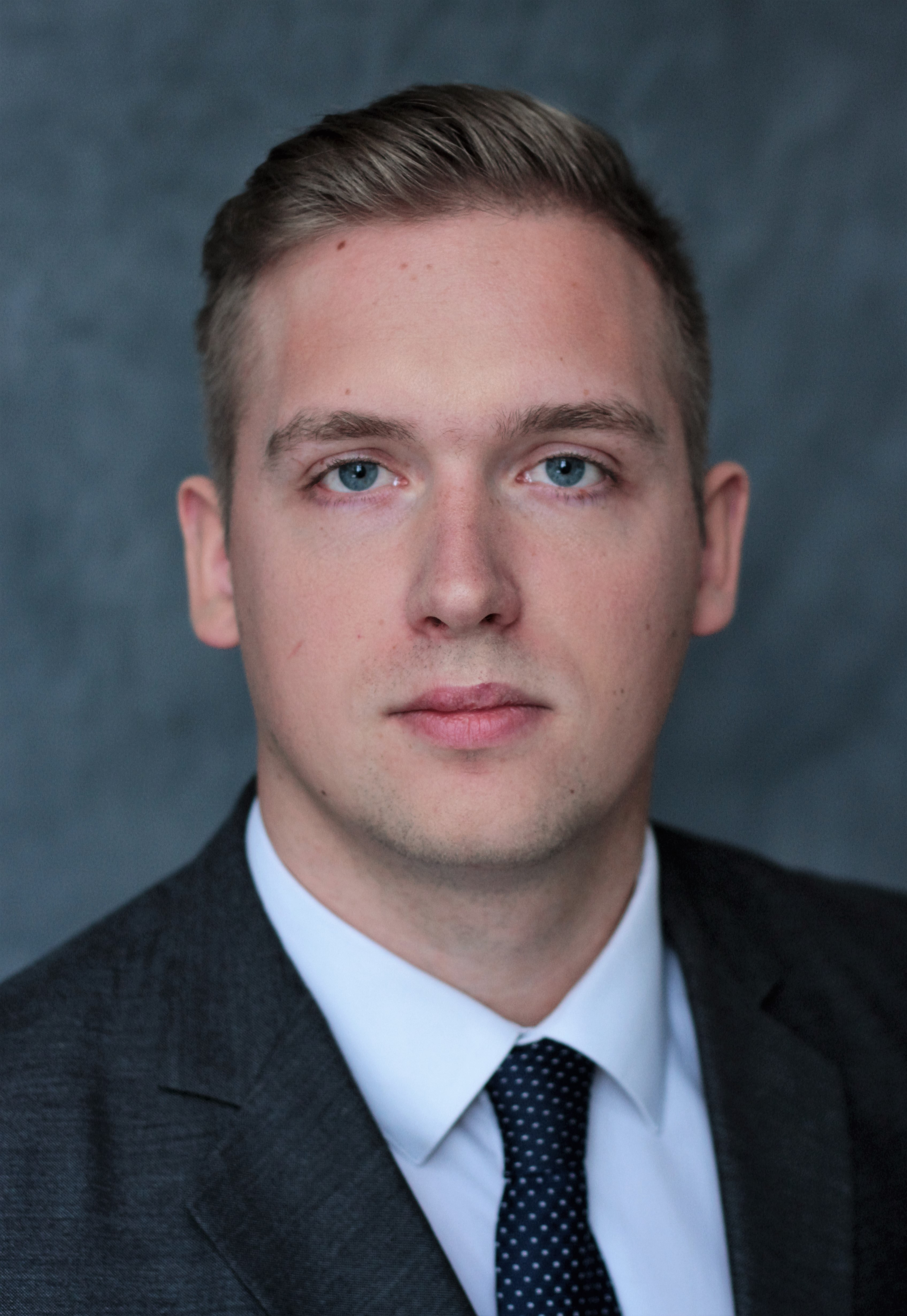

Mayor of Vilnius District Municipality
- Incumbent
- Assumed office 19 March 2023
- Preceded by: Marija Rekst

Member of Vilnius District Municipal Council
- In office 27 April 2017 – 19 March 2023

Personal details
- Born: 15 August 1991 (age 35) Mažosios Kabiškės, Lithuania
- Party: Social Democratic Party of Lithuania (2014-present)
- Spouse: Jolanta Šimanska (m. 2022)
- Children: 1
- Education: Mykolas Romeris University

Robert Duchniewicz (Lithuanian: Robert Duchnevič or Robertas Duchnevičius, born 15 August 1991) is a Lithuanian Polish politician. As of 2023, he is the vice-chairman of the Social Democratic Party of Lithuania and mayor of Vilnius District Municipality, which includes the rural districts around Vilnius and the Vilnius urban area's outskirts.

== Biography ==
Duchniewicz was born in Mažosios Kabiškės, a village north of Vilnius, in 1991. He finished the Nemenčinė Konstantas Parčevskis Gymnasium in 2010 and graduated from the Mykolas Romeris University with a master's degree in commercial law in 2017.

In 2014, for a short time, he worked as a deputy's assistant in the Seimas Chancellery, and from 2015 onwards, until 2023, he was employed as a lawyer in the Department of National Minorities at the Government of Lithuania. He is a member of the Polish Discussion Club, an association aimed at promoting dialogue among Lithuanian Poles and between Poles and Lithuanians.

He joined the Social Democrats in 2014 and was elected chairman of the party's Vilnius District branch in 2017. After Stanislovas Giedraitis was removed from his seat in the Vilnius District Municipal Council due to changing his place of residence out of the municipality, Duchniewicz assumed the seat on 27 April 2017 and remained until 2023.

In 2021, he was appointed as one of the vice-chairpeople of party chairwoman Vilija Blinkevičiūtė, and was also appointed chairman of the Internal Affairs Committee.

Duchnevič was among the four leading candidates considered for the position of Prime Minister of Lithuania following the resignation of Gintautas Paluckas amid a corruption scandal.

== Electoral history ==
Duchniewicz ran as the Social Democratic candidate in the Medininkai constituency in the 2020 parliamentary election. He finished second, with 14.91 percent of the vote, while the constituency was won by Czesław Olszewski, representing the Electoral Action of Poles in Lithuania, in the first round with 55.82 percent of the vote.

In the 2023 municipal elections, he ran for Mayor of Vilnius District Municipality as the Social Democratic candidate. The municipality had been ruled by the Electoral Action of Poles (and its predecessor, the Association of Poles in Lithuania) since 1990, with permanent majorities in the municipal council. As the incumbent mayor since 2004, Maria Rekść, refused to run for reelection, the LLRA-KŠS candidate was the party's vice-chairman Waldemar Urban. In an upset, Urban only won 46.63 percent of the vote, as opposed to Duchniewicz's 24.84 percent of the vote.

Duchniewicz was endorsed by Lithuanian parties and politicians across the political spectrum, including Prime Minister Ingrida Šimonytė and the "Centre-Right Coalition" in the Vilnius District Municipal Council (a joint electoral list by the Homeland Union, Liberals' Movement and Freedom Party). He ran as a candidate of change after three decades of rule by the LLRA-LŠS, and organized an active campaign. Waldemar Tomaszewski attacked him rhetorically for his inexperience, and the chairman of LLRA-KŠS expressed his certainty in Urban's victory.

In mayor election's second round, Duchniewicz narrowly won with 50.2 percent of the vote, and stated that this is a victory for "all of Lithuania". At 31 years old, he was the youngest mayor elected in the 2023 municipal election.

After three months of negotiations and conflict, Duchniewicz signed a confidence and supply agreement with the majority Polish Electoral Action group in the municipal council on 8 June 2023. This prompted the Centre-Right Coalition to declare themselves the official opposition, in spite of Duchniewicz's insistence of forming a local government "without an opposition group".

== Political positions ==
Duchniewicz is in favor of progressive taxation, same-sex marriage and decriminalization of marijuana. He supports dual citizenship in Lithuania and further European integration. In 2023, Duchevič criticized the Commission of the Lithuanian Language (VLKK) for its proposed new guidelines on the state language. According to him, certain provisions in the guidelines are directed against schools of national minorities. However, he describes himself as a Roman Catholic and stated that he will not abolish the enthronement of Jesus Christ in the Vilnius District in 2009, as it "causes no harm".
