= Jan Sienkiewicz =

Lithuanian publicist, journalist and activist

Jan Sienkiewicz (Lithuanian: Jan Senkevič; born January 10, 1956), is a Lithuanian publicist of Polish ethnicity, journalist, translator, activist of the Polish minority in Lithuania, member of the Lithuanian Seimas from 1997 to 2000.

From 1973 to 1978, he studied English and German philology in Minsk, after which he worked for a year at a primary school near Ashmyany in Belarus. After returning to Lithuania, he worked on the editorial staff of the daily Czerwony Sztandar (1979-1989). Initially a translator there, he later became a correspondent and head of department. In 1990, he was co-founder and co-publisher of the Polish biweekly Magazyn Wileński, with which he worked until 1997. In 1991, he became co-founder and co-owner of the Polish Publishing House in Vilnius.

He was one of the creators and first chairman of the Socio-Cultural Association of Poles in Lithuania, which was established on May 5, 1988. When Sąjūdis set up Lithuanian International Coordinatory Association in order to deal with ethnic minority matters, Sienkiewicz was representing SSKPL, together with Artur Płokszto, until they left it in May 1989. At the SSKPL's first congress on 15–16 April 1989, Jan Sienkiewicz proposed its transformation into a new organisation, in order to avoid accusations that a cultural organisation is engaging in political activities. The proposal was accepted, and the association has withdrawn from the Lithuanian Cultural Fund and transformed into the Union of Poles in Lithuania. Sienkiewicz became a chairman of the new organisation. At the Union's Third Congress on December 14, 1991, he did not seek election for another term, his place was taken by Jan Mincewicz.

In 1994, he was one of the co-founders of the Polish political party in Lithuania – Electoral Action of Poles in Lithuania (EAPL). He was the first chairman of this party. From 1995 to 1997, he was a member of the Vilnius City Council. On March 23, 1997 he was elected member of parliament for the Vilnius-Šalčininkai district, getting 84% of all votes cast. In the Seimas, he joined the Independent Faction. He also became a member of the Committee for Human and Civil Rights and National Affairs. In March 1998, the Lithuanian Parliament's Ethics and Procedures Committee has punished Jan Sienkiewicz for holding a press conference for Polish journalists in Polish at the parliament building. He held his mandate until October 10, 2000, and resigned from running in the next election and withdrew from politics. On May 27, 2000, he was re-elected chairman of the Union of Poles in Lithuania, and he held this position until his resignation on June 21, 2001.

He is the author of approximately 900 articles published in the Polish press in Lithuania, texts concerning mainly Polish issues. He is a regular columnist in Kurier Wileński. His articles written during the period of his chairmanship of the organisation of Lithuanian Poles and his mandate as a member of parliament have been published in the form of two anthologies. He is the author or editor of several books, among them Michał Römer diaries. He has also been involved in the documentation of cemeteries in Lithuania, registering the Polish graves there.

== Selected publications ==
- Żywot jak słońce. Wspomnienia księdza prałata Józefa Obrębskiego, Vilnius 1996.
- Ksiądz Józef Grasewicz, Toruń 1999.
- Józef Gasewicz, Wspomnienia, baśnie, Toruń 1999 (editor).
- Ustawy i postawy. Zapiski z poselskiej ławy, Vilnius 2001.
- Nadworna malarka Ostrobramskiej. Saga rodu Krepsztulów, Vilnius 2002.
- Dokumenty Związku Polaków na Litwie 1988-1998, Vilnius 2003.
- Kronika na gorąco pisana. „Czerwony Sztandar” – „Kurier Wileński” 1953–2003, Vilnius 2003.
- Szkoły polskie w Republice Litewskiej, Vilnius 2009.
- Groby polskie na Litwie, Vol. 1-2, Warsaw 2021.

== Bibliography ==
- Bobryk, Adam (2006). Odrodzenie narodowe Polaków w Republice Litewskiej 1987-1997 [Polish National Revival in the Republic of Lithuania 1987-1997] (in Polish). Toruń: Dom Wydawniczy DUET. ISBN 978-83-89706-68-3.
- Bobryk, Adam (2013). Społeczne znaczenie funkcjonowania polskich ugrupowań politycznych w Republice Litewskiej 1989-2013 [Social significance of the functioning of Polish political groups in the Republic of Lithuania 1989-2013] (PDF) (in Polish). Siedlce: Siedleckie Towarzystwo Naukowe. ISBN 9788362160167.
- Jundo-Kaliszewska, Barbara (2019). Zakładnicy historii. Mniejszość polska w postradzieckiej Litwie [Hostages of history. The Polish minority in post-Soviet Lithuania] (in Polish). Łódź: Wydawnictwo Uniwersytetu Łódzkiego. ISBN 9788381421966.
- Kosman, Michał M. (2001). "Polacy na Litwie wobec odrodzenia państwowości litewskiej" [Poles in Lithuania and the revival of Lithuanian statehood] (PDF). In Pająk, K.; Załubski, J. (eds.). U schyłku tysiąclecia: księga pamiątkowa z okazji sześćdziesięciolecia urodzin Profesora Marcelego Kosmana (in Polish). Poznań: Forum Nauk. ISBN 83-88544-01-2.
