= Irina Rozova =

Lithuanian politician (1958–2023)

Member of the Seimas
- In office 2012–2020
- In office 2004–2008

Personal details
- Born: 23 January 1958 Klaipėda, Lithuanian SSR, USSR
- Died: 19 July 2023 (aged 65)
- Party: Russian Alliance
- Other political affiliations: Electoral Action of Poles in Lithuania
- Education: Lomonosov Moscow State University
- Occupation: Journalist

Irina Rozova (23 January 1958 – 19 July 2023) was a Lithuanian journalist and politician. A member of the Russian Alliance party, she served in the Seimas on the Lithuanian Poles' Electoral Action-Christian Family Association Group election list.

== Early life ==
Irina Rozova was born on 23 January 1958 in Klaipėda. She earned her diploma in journalism from the Lomonosov Moscow State University.

== Career ==
In 1981, Rozova was appointed the music director of the State Committee for Television and Radio Broadcasting in Omsk Oblast, a post she held until 1984, when she was transferred to the Kaliningrad Oblast. Rozova was a radio presenter at two stations Laluna and Raduga during 1996–2006. In 2002 she joined the Russian Alliance and was elected to the Klaipėda City Municipal Council a year later. She became the deputy governor of Klaipėda County in 2005. She also taught English language at secondary schools in Klaipėda.

From 2006 to 2008, Rozova was a member of the Ninth Seimas and served on its committee for Development of Information Society. She served in the Eleventh Seimas from 2012 to 2016, and she was re-elected in 2016 to the Twelfth Seimas. In June 2017, she became the deputy chair of the parliamentary Commission for Addiction Prevention.

== Personal life and death ==
Rozova was married with two children. She died on 19 July 2023, at the age of 65.
