= Sudervė Eldership =

Sudervė Eldership Sudervės seniūnija
- Eldership
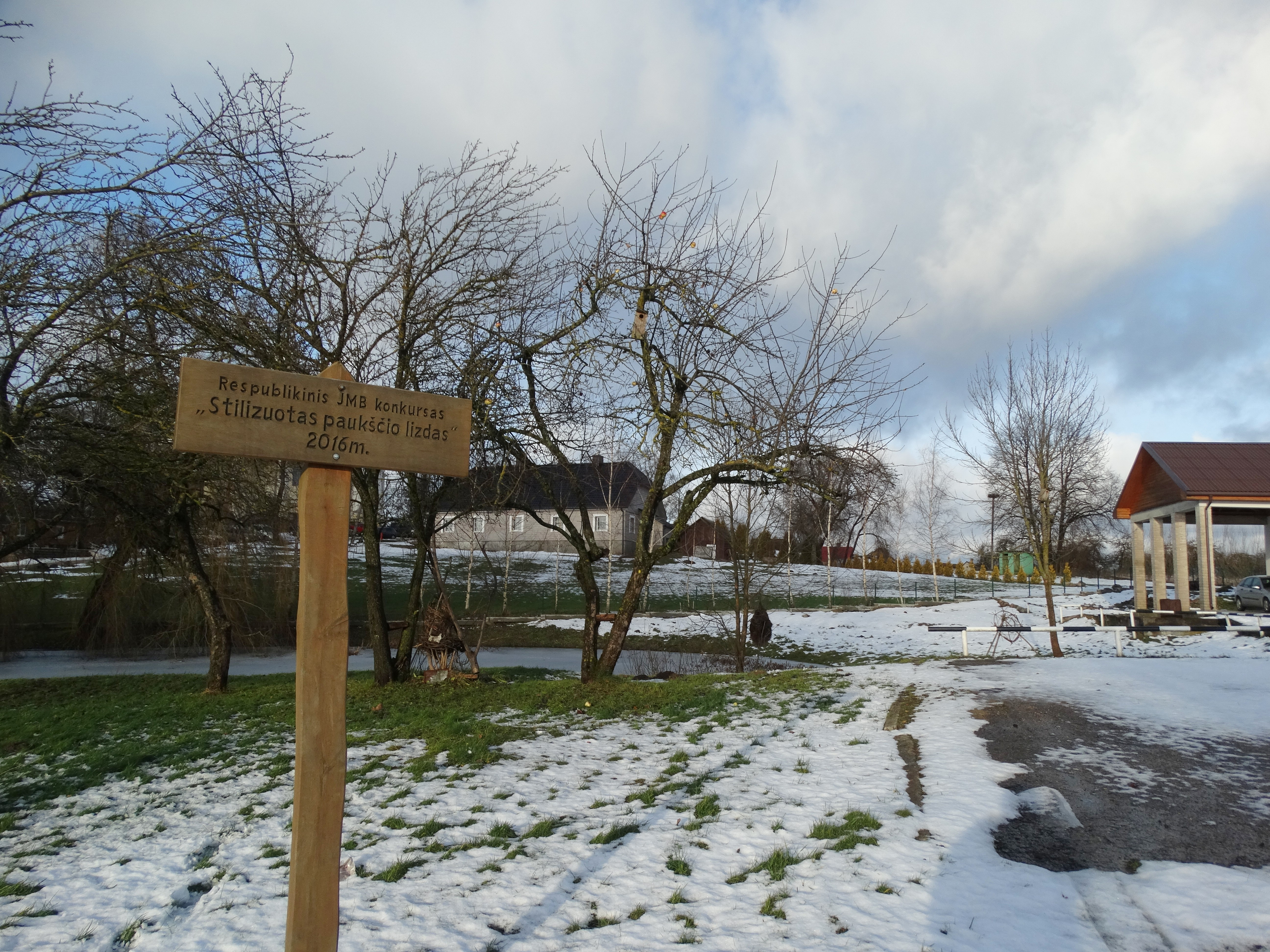

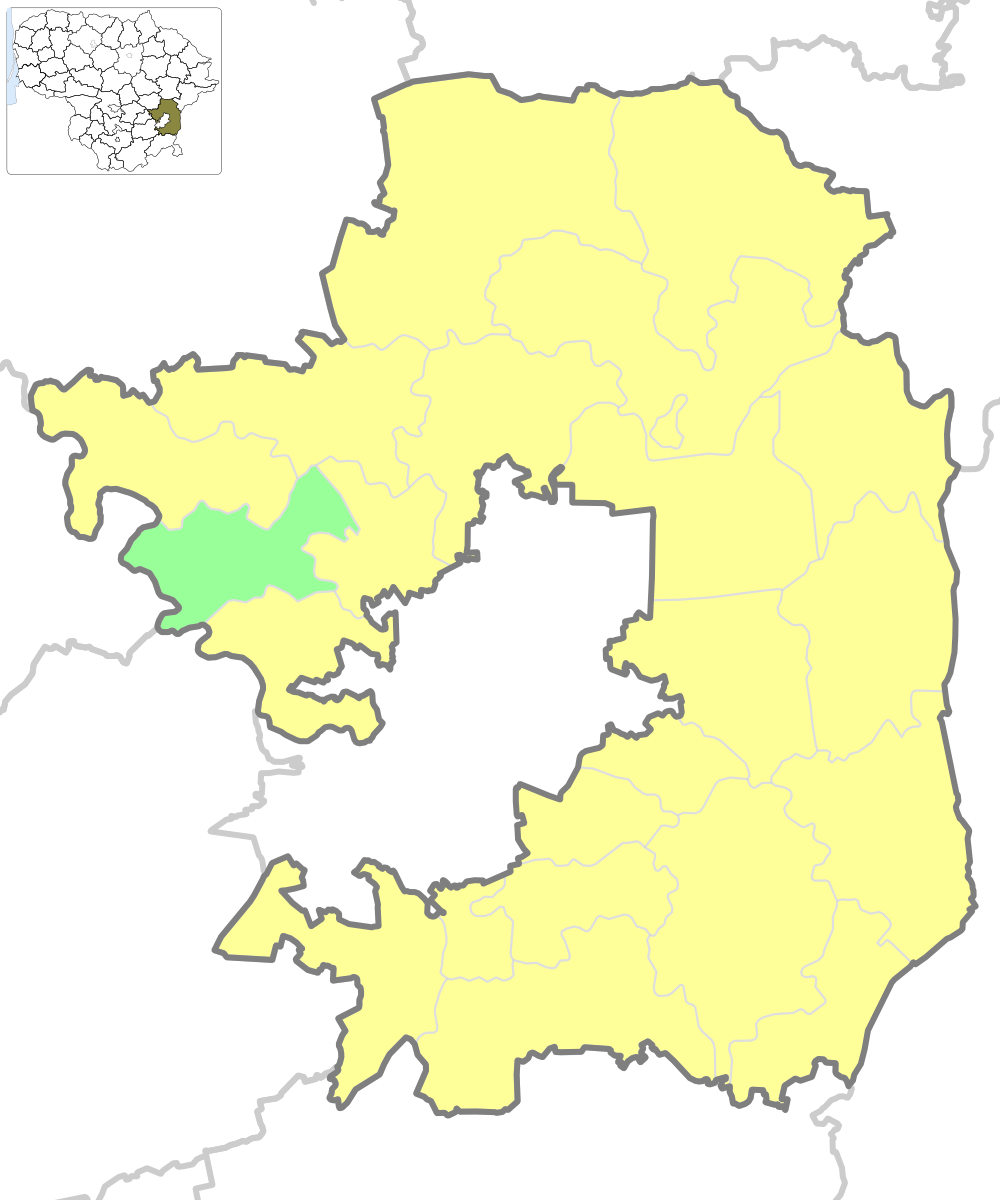
- Location of Rudamina Eldership
- Country: Lithuania
- Ethnographic region: Dzūkija
- County: Vilnius County
- Municipality: Vilnius District Municipality
- Administrative centre: Sudervė

Area
  - Total: 79 km^{2} (31 sq mi)

Population
  - Total: 2,829
  - Density: 36/km^{2} (93/sq mi)
- Time zone: UTC+2 (EET)
  - Summer (DST): UTC+3 (EEST)
- Website: https://www.vrsa.lt

Sudervės Eldership (Lithuanian: Sudervės seniūnija) is an eldership in Lithuania, located in Vilnius District Municipality, west of Vilnius.

== Ethnic composition ==
According to 2021 National Census data, the ethnic composition is as follows:

- Lithuanians - 50.2%
- Poles - 38.8%
