= Jan Ciechanowicz =

Lithuanian politician (1946–2022)

- Born: July 2, 1946; Varniany, Byelorussian SSR, Soviet Union
- Died: January 10, 2022 (aged 75); Płock, Poland
- Other names: Ivanas Tichonovičius, Janas Ciechanowiczius, Janas Ciechanovičius, Иван Станиславович Тихонович
- Citizenship: Soviet Union, Poland, Lithuania
- Education: Pedagogical Institute of Foreign Languages
- Occupation: Pedagogist
- Years active: 1975-1991

Jan Ciechanowicz (Lithuanian: Ivanas Tichonovičius, Janas Ciechanowiczius, Janas Ciechanovičius; Russian: Иван Станиславович Тихонович; 2 July 1946 – 10 January 2022) was a Polish Lithuanian politician who was an ethnic Polish member of the Supreme Soviet of the USSR (1989–1991). He was author of several academic publications in Polish, Belarusian, Lithuanian and Russian.

== Life and career ==
Ciechanowicz was born in Varniany, Byelorussian SSR, on 2 July 1946. He studied at the Pedagogical Institute of Foreign Languages in Minsk (1964–1970). He proceeded to earn a doctor's degree. He then worked as a teacher of German and English in Polish schools in the Lithuanian SSR.

In 1975 he became a docent at the University of Vilnius, later becoming the dean of the faculty of Polish at the Vilnius Pedagogical University (1988–1989). In 1988, Ciechanowicz was one of the founders of the Association of Poles in Lithuania. In 1989, he was elected to the Supreme Soviet of the USSR. Ciechanowicz represented pro-Soviet positions, supporting the continuation of the USSR.

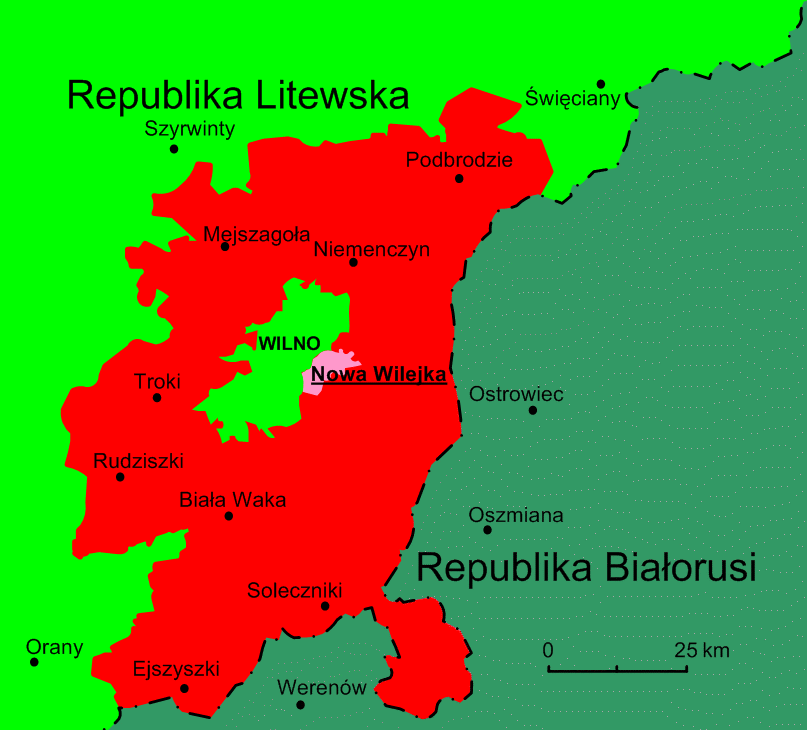
The self-proclaimed Polish National-Territorial Region

He was one of the supporters of the autonomy movement of the Poles of the Vilnius region, that had been part of Poland which was part of Poland between 1920 and 1939.

From May 1990, he was the leader of the ephemeral Polish Human Rights Party, intended to cover the entire Soviet Union and represent all Poles in the Soviet Union. The party's program included fighting anti-Polish sentiment, working for the establishment of Polish autonomous districts in all Soviet republics and also the idea of establishing the East Polish Soviet Socialist Republic (Republic of Eastern Poland), which was to eventually include all lands lost by Poland after World War II to the USSR. According to Ciechanowicz, he discussed the issue with Mikhail Gorbachev in late May or early June 1989 during the first session of the Congress of People's Deputies of the Soviet Union. In addition to this, Ciechanowicz claims to have discussed the issue with Nursultan Nazarbayev and Islam Karimov, and to have promoted it in the United States Congress, where he attended a meeting of one of the committees at the invitation of Congressmen John Dingell and Konjorski (probably Paul Kanjorski), but had support only from a section of the Polish press in the United States.

On 6 October 1990, during the second round of the Second Congress of Deputies of the Vilnius Region in Eišiškės, Ciechanowicz proposed the proclamation of the Autonomous Polish Vilnius Unit with the status of a republic within the USSR. After its rejection, Ciechanowicz later proposed a compromise providing for the declaration of full territorial autonomy as part of Lithuania: if this proposal was not accepted by Lithuanian authorities, the autonomy would then be proclaimed as part of the USSR. If this project also failed, the autonomy would be proclaimed at the next congress as part of Poland. The proposal would also be later rejected.

No major political parties or organizations in Poland publicly supported Ciechanowicz's ideas. The proposition was protested by the Solidarity, and other international Polish media. The following developments in Lithuania, which eventually led to its full independence in 1991, eventually ended any conversations about the proposition of the East Polish SSR.

Jan Ciechanowicz, in 1992, made a pledge to the Prosecutor General's Office of Lithuania that he would no longer engage in political activity. Then, due to his inability to get a job in Lithuania, he settled in Poland, retaining his Lithuanian citizenship. In Poland he taught German and English at institutions of higher education. He died on 10 January 2022, at the age of 75 from COVID-19 in Płock during the COVID-19 pandemic in Poland.

== Bibliography ==
- Bobryk, Adam (2013). Społeczne znaczenie funkcjonowania polskich ugrupowań politycznych w Republice Litewskiej 1989 - 2013 [Social significance of the functioning of Polish political groups in the Republic of Lithuania 1989 - 2013] (in Polish). Siedlce.
- Jundo-Kaliszewska, Barbara (2019). Zakładnicy historii. Mniejszość polska w postradzieckiej Litwie [Hostages of history. The Polish minority in post-Soviet Lithuania] (in Polish). Łódź.
