= Electoral Action of Poles in Lithuania – Christian Families Alliance =

Lithuanian political party

Electoral Action of Poles in Lithuania – Christian Families Alliance Lietuvos lenkų rinkimų akcija – Krikščioniškų šeimų sąjunga Akcja Wyborcza Polaków na Litwie – Związek Chrześcijańskich Rodzin
- Abbreviation: LLRA-KŠS
- Chairperson: Waldemar Tomaszewski
- Vice Chairpeople: Zbignev Jedinskij; Vanda Kravčionok; Zdzislav Palevič; Marija Rekst; Leonard Talmont
- Secretary General: Renata Sobieska-Monkevič
- Founder: Jan Sienkiewicz
- Founded: 28 August 1994
- Headquarters: Pilies g. 16, Vilnius
- Membership: 2,097 (2022)
- Ideology: Polish minority interests; Christian democracy; Conservatism
- Political position: Centre-right
- National affiliation: Lithuanian Farmers, Greens and Christian Families Union
- European affiliation: European Conservatives and Reformists Party
- European Parliament group: European Conservatives and Reformists Group
- Colours: Maroon; Blue
- Seimas: 3 / 141 (2%)
- European Parliament: 1 / 11 (9%)
- Municipal councils: 57 / 1,498
- Mayors: 1 / 60

Website
- awpl.lt

Electoral Action of Poles in Lithuania – Christian Families Alliance or EAPL–CFA (Lithuanian: Lietuvos lenkų rinkimų akcija – Krikščioniškų šeimų sąjunga or LLRA–KŠS; Polish: Akcja Wyborcza Polaków na Litwie – Związek Chrześcijańskich Rodzin or AWPL–ZChR) is a political party in Lithuania. It positions itself as Christian-democratic. It has 3 seats in the Seimas, 1 seat in the European Parliament and 57 seats in municipal councils after the 2023 local election.

Formed in 1994 from the political wing of the Association of Poles in Lithuania, LLRA experienced a surge in support in the 2000s, under the leadership of Waldemar Tomaszewski. It increased its representation from under 2% in 2000, leading to the party being invited to join the governing coalition: an invitation they rejected. They increased their vote again to 3.8% in 2004 and 4.8% in 2008: just short of the 5% election threshold for any of the Seimas's 70 proportional representation seats. In the 2009 European election, they won 8.2% and one seat. The party's vote is concentrated in the south-east of the country, around the capital, where the Polish minority is located. At the 2012 election, LLRA broke through 5% in a parliamentary election for the first time: qualifying for proportional representation seats.

LLRA's MEP (its leader Valdemar Tomaševski) sits in the European Parliament with the European Conservatives and Reformists, which includes the Polish Law and Justice.

== History ==
At the beginning of 1994, the law on social organisations was adopted. According to this law, social organizations had to transform into political parties or simply remain social organizations. Until that time, the Association of Poles in Lithuania (LLA) was a public-political organisation. Thus it had the option to act both in social and political spheres. The Polish community which did not have its own party faced the difficult task of keeping the Association and simultaneously enabling its participation in the political life of Lithuania at the same time. The creation of the party required a lot of organizational effort. In this situation the central administration of the LLA convened the 5th Extraordinary Conference of the LLA on 14 August. During the Conference the decision was adopted to transform the APL into a social organisation and support the efforts of the group initiating the establishment of a party set up under the name of the Electoral Action of the LLA. Finally, on 23 October after pressure from the Lithuanian Ministry of Justice to remove the word 'Union' from the name of the party, it was registered as the Electoral Action of Poles in Lithuania (LLRA). During the Founding Conference of 1994 and 1997 Jan Sienkiewicz was elected as LLRA leader. In 1999 during the 3rd LLRA Conference Valdemar Tomaševski became the chairman of the organisation. Moreover, Tomaševski was elected as leader in the 4th and 5th LLRA Conferences.

The LLRA takes part in various elections – starting with municipal through parliamentary and ending with the elections to the European Parliament in 2004. During the whole period of its existence, the LLRA took part in defense of the interests of the Polish minority in Lithuania. The Union of the Russians of Lithuania had cooperated with the LLRA in elections, running within a common list in 2004.

In 2016, Electoral Action of Poles in Lithuania changed its name to Electoral Action of Poles in Lithuania – Christian Families Alliance.

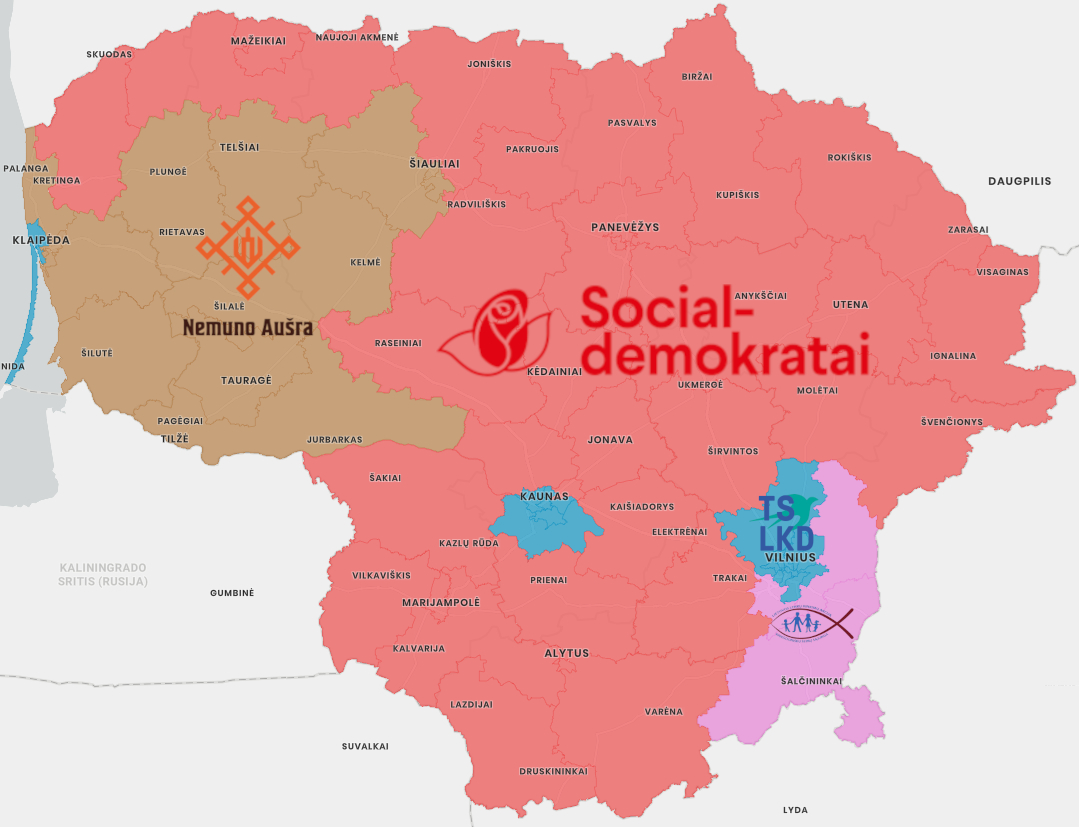
2024 Lithuanian parliamentary election map by electoral district. Electoral districts where EAPL–CFA received majority of the votes are marked in pink.

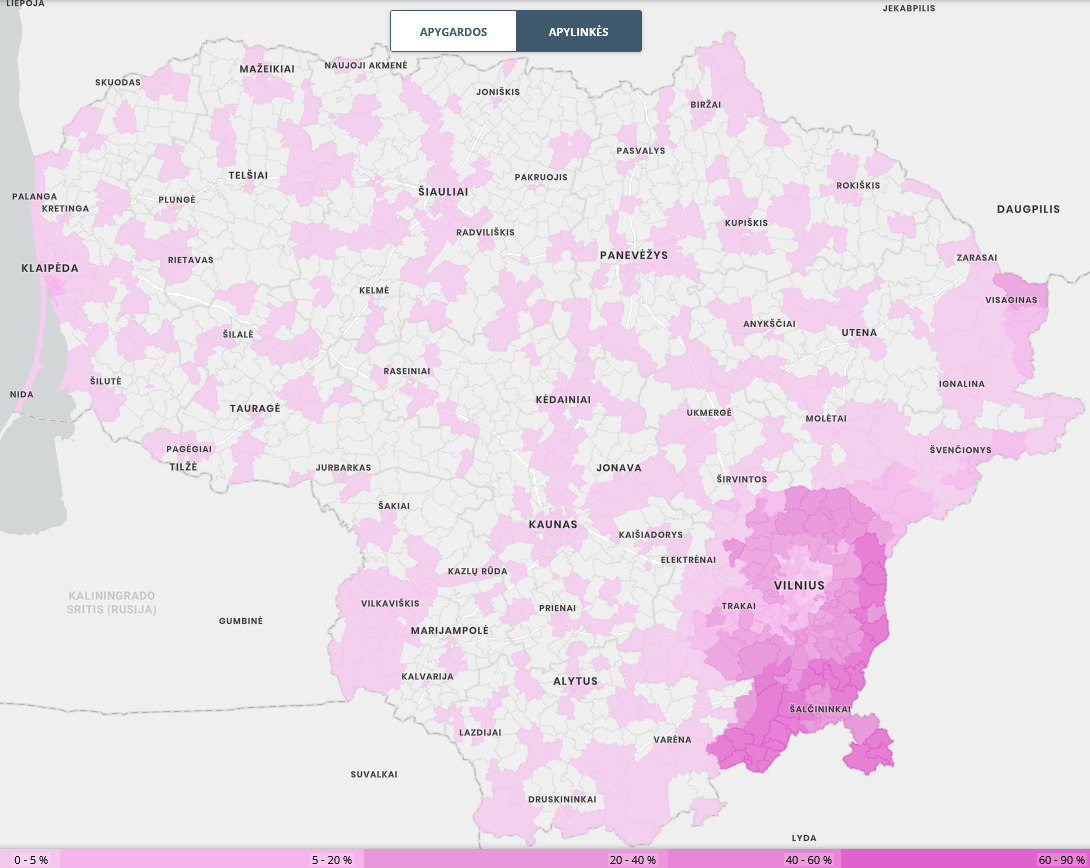
EAPL–CFA voting by district in the 2024 Seimas elections (multi-member constituency)

== Ideology ==
The party's primary aim is not ideological, but the protection and enhancement of the rights of the Poles in Lithuania, who make up 6.5% of country's population.

It supports a more influential political role for the Roman Catholic Church, mandatory religious education in schools, and a reduction in the number of Lithuanian parliamentarians from 141 to 101 coupled to an increase in the number of local councillors. Since 2005, it unsuccessfully tried to submit bills to penalize abortion.

Economically, the party supports pro-social and welfare policies - it has a strong social and redistributive component to its economic positions. It stresses the need to combat poverty, and proposes a catalogue of welfare programs such as a family support program based on the Polish safety net, as well as an increase in social insurance spending, free school dinners, and a raise in child benefits to 70 euros a month, with additional 30 euros for low-income and large families. The LLRA–KŠS also postulates abolition of tuition fees for bachelor's studies and a program that would provide free basic medicine to the elderly. Apart from welfare, it also supports enhancing the Lithuanian road financing program and increasing the income tax.

According to the Polish political scientist Paweł Gotowiecki, the party "can be described as a classic Christian democracy." Despite claiming to not have an ideological basis, the LLRA–KŠS competes with other Lithuanian parties, especially the center-right ones, as it campaigns on similar policies and values. However, while the party focuses on promoting traditionalist values and Political Catholicism, its natural allies are the Lithuanian centre-left parties. The LLRA–KŠS also proposes policies implemented in Poland, such as the Polish "Family 500+" welfare program that grants parents a monthly income of 500 PLN per child.

LLRA's leader Valdemar Tomaszewski is considered to be a pro-Russian, since he had condemned the Euromaidan protests in Ukraine and had been seen wearing the Ribbon of Saint George, a symbol strongly associated with Russian nationalism and support for Vladimir Putin. Tomaszewski said that Euromaidan protests in Ukraine were "the greatest evil". While another member of the LLRA party, Zbignev Jedinskij, in his Facebook profile called on NATO to begin bombing Kyiv to force peace in 2014. The usage of Ribbon of Saint George by Tomaszewski was criticized by Bogdan Borusewicz, the Marshal of the Senate of the Republic of Poland, describing him as "crossing the line". The mass media in Poland also criticized Tomaszewski and urged for stopping financial support for "Putin's allies". Moreover, at the time Tomaszewski opposed to support the Ukrainian government formed following the Revolution of Dignity, sought for closer cooperation with Belarus, had no opinion if Lithuania should stand in solidarity with the Ukrainian-side in the Crimean question and described Russia as "probably not" dangerous for the security of Lithuania. Tomaszewski and other members of the LLRA participate in the mass public Victory Day (9 May) commemorations. In September 2020, Tomaszewski and the LLRA fraction in Seimas did not participate in a voting on adopting a resolution regarding the illegal and imposed union of Russia with Belarus and stated that it creates tension between neighbors. Moreover, Tomaszewski criticized Lithuanian government for its support to the Belarusian opposition, banning of Russian media channels, and compared the annexation of Crimea as an analogy with the Kosovo question. In August 2020, Tomaszewski narrated that "there is nothing worse than revolutions". Soon afterwards the LLRA scored 4,82% during the 2020 Lithuanian parliamentary election and did not qualify to the Thirteenth Seimas of Lithuania.

In 2017, LLRA member Zbignev Jedziński criticized Lithuanian Prime Minister Saulius Skvernelis support to increase Lithuania's defensive spending to 2,5% of its gross domestic product since 2020 and instead suggested to sign a non-aggression pact between Lithuania and Russia. While during the 2020–2021 Belarusian protests Jedziński stated that the Belarusian police forces are defending the Constitution of Belarus, despite numerous human rights issues related to the suppression of the 2020 Belarusian protests.

Following the beginning of the 2022 Russian invasion of Ukraine, Tomaszewski condemned Russia's actions and co-authored a motion in the European Parliament in support of Ukraine. Nevertheless, in March 2022 Tomaszewski opposed the banning of the Ribbon of Saint George by narrating that "it would be a return to Bolshevik times" and that "the ribbon actually stands for the heroic struggle against the real evil – fascism". On March 31, 2022, Jedziński encouraged Poland to "leave NATO and the EU as soon as possible and create an alliance with Russia ... [to] benefit Polish citizens and not someone from across the ocean", which was followed by several prominent party politicians, such as Vilnius District Vice Mayor Robert Kamarowski and former Deputy Minister of Energy of Lithuania Renata Cytacka, leaving the party.

For the first time since 1995, LLRA's member Waldemar Urban lost the 2023 mayor election of the Vilnius District Municipality to Social Democrats Robert Duchniewicz, who publicly describe the members of the LLRA as "woldemortians that scare the people to vote and to work off for them". On 12 June 2023, the Central Electoral Commission of the Republic of Lithuania stated that the LLRA–KŠS indirectly bribed voters by giving gifts to children in the Vilnius District last year and that persons belonging to the electoral list of candidates for the Vilnius District Council and the then mayoral candidate Waldemar Urban conducted campaigning that did not comply with the principles of fair and honorable elections.

== External relations ==
LLRA is a member of the Europe-wide anti-federalist Alliance of European Conservatives and Reformists (AECR), along with both Law and Justice from Poland. It is also member of the AECR's associated political grouping, the European Conservatives and Reformists, having resisted intensive lobbying from the Polish Civic Platform to join the EPP group, to which Civic Platform belong and to which LLRA had been considered likely to join. Its youth wing belongs to the European Young Conservatives.

Since 2008, the party is actively collaborating with the Russian Alliance (Russian: Русский альянс) and previously formed an electoral alliance with the Lithuanian Russian Union.

The party has received criticism from some Polish politicians for its support and connections to Russian politicians.

The LLRA is criticized by ethnic Pole Robert Duchniewicz (LSDP), who was elected mayor of the Vilnius District Municipality in 2023 and described it as "the victory not only of the Vilnius district, but also the entire Lithuania". Moreover, Robert Duchnevič and Ewelina Dobrowolska publicly stated that the "tomaševskians should not be called as party of the Poles".

In May 2023, Mateusz Morawiecki, the Prime Minister of Poland, awarded Stanisław Pieszko (member of the central board of the LLRA, who in the past refrained during a parliamentary voting for adopting the Act of March 11 in 1990) and Waldemar Tomaszewski with the badges of honor for services to the Polish diaspora. The awarding was described by the Lithuanian media as a scandal, was criticized in the Polish media and by Lithuanian politicians (e.g. signatories Rimvydas Valatka, Česlav Okinčic), and the Lithuanian Minister of Foreign Affairs discussed it with the Polish ambassador in Lithuania.

== Election results ==
=== Seimas ===
Election	Leader	Votes (Note: Proportional representation votes)	%	Seats	+/–	Government
1992	Jan Sienkiewicz	39,772	2.14 (#7)	4 / 141	New	Opposition
1996	Jan Sienkiewicz	40,941	3.13 (#9)	1 / 141	▼3	Opposition
2000	Waldemar Tomaszewski	28,641	1.95 (#10)	2 / 141	▲1	Coalition (2000–2001)
2000	Waldemar Tomaszewski	28,641	1.95 (#10)	2 / 141	▲1	Opposition (2001–2004)
2004	Waldemar Tomaszewski	45,302	3.79 (#7)	2 / 141	Steady	Opposition
2008	Waldemar Tomaszewski	59,237	4.79 (#8)	3 / 141	▲1	Opposition
2012	Waldemar Tomaszewski	79,840	6.08 (#7)	8 / 141	▲5	Coalition (2012–2014)
2012	Waldemar Tomaszewski	79,840	6.08 (#7)	8 / 141	▲5	Opposition (2014–2016)
2016	Waldemar Tomaszewski	69,810	5.72 (#6)	8 / 141	Steady	Opposition (2016–2019)
2016	Waldemar Tomaszewski	69,810	5.72 (#6)	8 / 141	Steady	Coalition (2019–2020)
2020	Waldemar Tomaszewski	56,386	4.97 (#7)	3 / 141	▼5	Opposition
2024	Waldemar Tomaszewski	48,288	3.96 (#8)	3 / 141	Steady	Opposition (2024–2025)
2024	Waldemar Tomaszewski	48,288	3.96 (#8)	3 / 141	Steady	Coalition (2025-2026)
2024	Waldemar Tomaszewski	48,288	3.96 (#8)	3 / 141	Steady	Coalition (since 2026)

=== European Parliament ===
Election	List leader	Votes	%	Seats	+/–	EP Group
2004 (Note: Run in a joint list with LRS.)	Waldemar Tomaszewski	68,937	5.71 (#7)	0 / 13	New	–
2009	Waldemar Tomaszewski	46,293	8.42 (#5)	1 / 12	▲1	ECR
2014	Waldemar Tomaszewski	92,108	8.05 (#6)	1 / 11	0	ECR
2019	Waldemar Tomaszewski	69,263	5.50 (#7)	1 / 11	0	ECR
2024	Waldemar Tomaszewski	39,199	5.78 (#6)	1 / 11	0	ECR

=== Municipal councils ===
Municipality	Votes	Seats	Mayor
Vilnius	23,892	7 / 51	No
Vilnius District Municipality	21,127	18 / 31	No
Šalčininkai District Municipality	12,134	21 / 25	Yes
Trakai District Municipality	2,683	6 / 25	No
Švenčionys District Municipality	997	2 / 25	No
Visaginas Municipality	684	2 / 25	No
Širvintos District Municipality	317	1 / 21	No

== Leaders ==
- Jan Sienkiewicz (1994–1999)
- Waldemar Tomaszewski (1999–present)

== Members of Parliament 2024-2028 ==
Parliamentarian	Since
Jaroslav Narkevicz	from 2008 until 2020 Since 2024
Rita Tamašunienė	since 2012
Česlav Olševski	since 2016

== See also ==
- Category:Electoral Action of Poles in Lithuania – Christian Families Alliance politicians
