= Mickūnai Eldership =

Mickūnai Eldership Mickūnų seniūnija
- Eldership
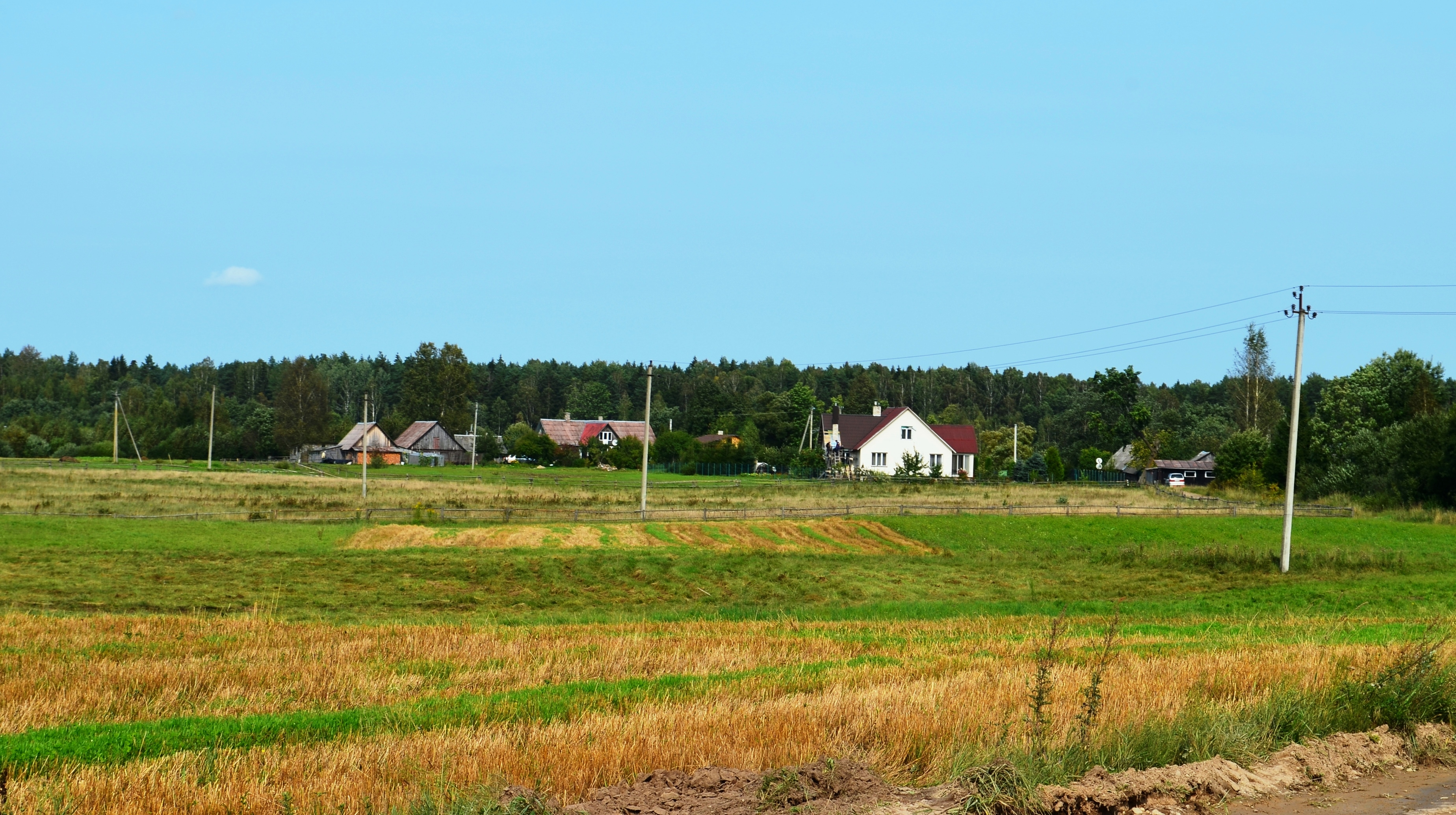

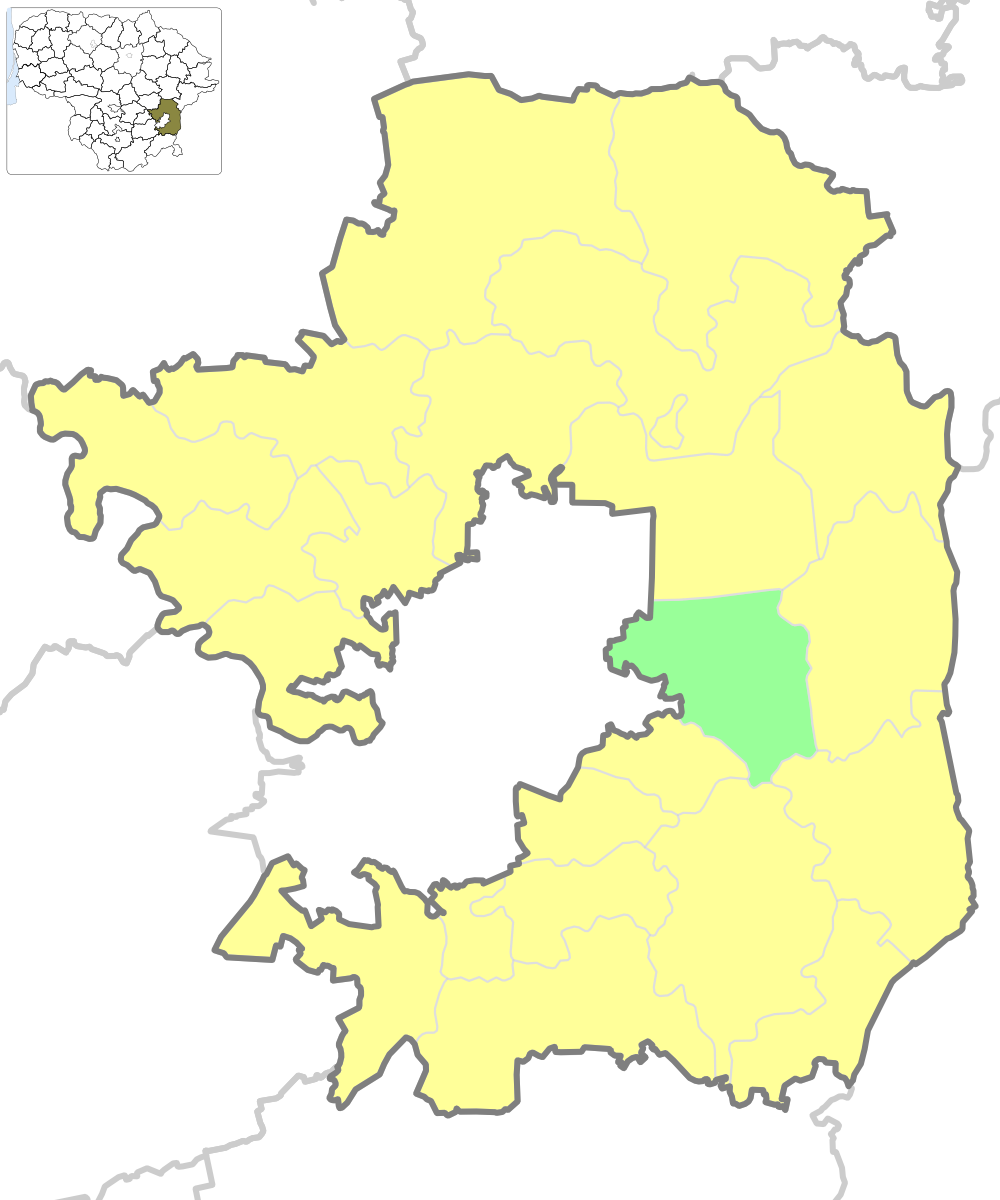
- Location of Mickūnai Eldership
- Country: Lithuania
- Ethnographic region: Dzūkija
- County: Vilnius County
- Municipality: Vilnius District Municipality
- Administrative centre: Mickūnai

Area
  - Total: 82 km^{2} (32 sq mi)

Population
  - Total: 5,409
  - Density: 66/km^{2} (170/sq mi)
- Time zone: UTC+2 (EET)
  - Summer (DST): UTC+3 (EEST)
- Website: https://www.vrsa.lt

Mickūnai Eldership (Lithuanian: Mickūnų seniūnija) is an eldership in Lithuania, located in Vilnius District Municipality, north-east of Vilnius.

== Ethnic composition ==
According to 2021 National Census data, there were 5409 inhabitants in Mickūnai eldership and the ethnic composition is as follows:

- Poles - 56.6%
- Lithuanians - 26.5%
- Russians - 7.2%
- Belarusians - 5.5%

According to 2011 National Census data, the ethnic composition was the following:

- Poles - 63%
- Lithuanians - 21%
- Belarusians - 7%
