= Česlovas =

- Gender: Male
- Language: Lithuanian language

Origin
- Meaning: cześć ("honour") + sława ("glory, famous")
- Region of origin: Slavic

Other names
- Related names: Czesław

Česlovas is a Lithuanian masculine given name and may refer to:

- Česlovas Juršėnas (born 1938), Lithuanian politician
- Česlovas Kudaba (1934–1993), Lithuanian politician
- Česlovas Kundrotas (born 1961), Lithuanian long-distance runner and Olympic competitor
- Česlovas Lukenskas (born 1959), Lithuanian sculpture and performance artist
- Česlovas Sasnauskas (1867–1916), Lithuanian composer
- Česlovas Stankevičius (born 1937), Lithuanian politician
