= Russian Alliance =

Russian Alliance Rusų aljansas Русский альянс
- Leader: Irina Rozova
- Chairperson: Tamara Lochankina
- Founded: 16 October 2002
- Dissolved: 31 January 2024
- Split from: Lithuanian Russian Union; Lithuanian Citizens' Alliance
- Headquarters: Klaipėda
- Membership (2023): 1,924 members
- Ideology: Russian minority interests Klaipėda regionalism
- Colours: Blue; Red

The Russian Alliance (Lithuanian: Rusų aljansas, Russian: Русский альянс, romanized: Russkiy al'yans) was a Lithuanian political party founded in 2002 which represented the interests of Russians in Lithuania and was based in the Klaipėda region, in western Lithuania. The party's chairperson during its existence was Tamara Lochankina, but its de facto leader was Member of the Seimas Irina Rozova.

The party was disbanded in 2022 and was de-registered by the Central Election Commission in 2024.

== History ==
The Russian Alliance was founded from the Klaipėda section of the Lithuanian Citizens' Alliance in 2002, but it also included members from other political parties, and the party's chairwoman Tamara Lochankina was elected to the Klaipėda City Council on the list of the Lithuanian Russian Union.

In the 2002 and 2007 local elections, the party won three mandates in Klaipėda City Municipality. Its member Irina Rozova participated in the 2004 Lithuanian parliamentary election on the list of the Peasants and New Democratic Party Union (later the Lithuanian Farmers and Greens Union).

In the 2011 local elections, the party formed joint election lists with the Electoral Action of Poles in Lithuania in several municipalities. It increased its number of mandates in municipal councils to 7 during the election. Since then, the two parties have cooperated.

The party had a Member of the Seimas, Irina Rozova, from 2006 to 2008, and from 2012 to 2020, when she was elected on the Polish Electoral Action list.

In 2016, after changes to electoral law raised the minimum number of members for an active party from 1000 to 2000 and the Russian Alliance was threatened with liquidation, it was kept afloat through efforts by the Polish Electoral Action. An LRT investigation confirmed that their party structures recruited several hundred new members to the Russian Alliance in the Polish-majority municipalities of Šalčininkai and the Vilnius district, many of whom were unaware of their membership.

After Lochankina's retirement, Rozova's death, and the Russian invasion of Ukraine in 2022, the Russian Alliance ceased functioning and was disbanded.

== Ideology ==
The Russian Alliance presented itself as a party for Russians and other national minorities in Lithuania, seeking to defend their interests and fight for social justice. It did not oppose Lithuania's membership in the European Union, but supported better relations with the Commonwealth of Independent States. However, some candidates of the party in Seimas elections, such as Rafael Muksinov, opposed Lithuania's membership in NATO and the European Union.

== Controversy ==
During its existence, the Russian Alliance was suspected to be a possible fifth column connected to the espionage services of Russia. After the 2015 local elections in Klaipėda City Municipality, councillors from the group "Puteikis Plus" put on face masks, protesting the Russian Alliance's inclusion in the governing coalition of the council, and the group's chairperson Nina Puteikienė claimed that the party is "unreliable and even hostile to the Republic of Lithuania".

It chose to not participate in the impeachment of Vyacheslav Titov, a Klaipėda city councilman who was charged for grossly disparaging the reputation of Lithuanian Forest Brothers and dismissing the extent of Soviet period atrocities against the Lithuanian nation, claiming that it would divide the Russian community.

Among its members and candidates to the Seimas were Romualda Poshevskaya and Dmitry Ikonokov, former journalists in the Russian state-controlled TV channel First Baltic channel, and former member of the Socialist People's Front and opponent of Lithuania's membership in NATO and the European Union Rafael Muksinov. The party's alliance with the Polish Electoral Action solicited protest from the government of Poland.

The party's primary Seimas representative's Irina Rozova's ties with Russian diplomats were the subject of an investigation by the Seimas Committee on National Security and Defence in 2019.
