= Časlav (name) =

Časlav (Serbian: Часлав) is a Slavic dithematic name, a variant found among South Slavs (Serbia). The element ča- (from a word meaning 'to await') The element -slav is a stem common in Slavic anthroponyms meaning that someone was famed or known for something.

Notable people named Časlav:

- Časlav Klonimirović, Serbian ruler (r. 927/933–944)
- Časlav Đorđević (b. 1942), Serbian writer
- Časlav Grubić (b. 1952), Yugoslav handball player
- Časlav Brukner (b. 1967), Serbian-Austrian quantum physicist

== See also ==
- Czesław
