= Lithuanian Russian Union =

Lithuanian Russian Union Lithuanian: Lietuvos rusų sąjunga Russian: Союз русских Литвы
- Leader: Sergey Dmitriyev
- Founded: 1995
- Dissolved: 2021
- Headquarters: Vilnius
- Ideology: Russian minority interests Social conservatism

The Lithuanian Russian Union (Lithuanian: Lietuvos rusų sąjunga, LRS; Russian: Союз русских Литвы, romanized: Soyuz russkikh Litvy) was a political party in Lithuania that represented Russians in Lithuania.

In 2007, the party formed an alliance with the Electoral Action of Poles in Lithuania, which represented Lithuania's Poles. In 2021, the party was dissolved.

== See also ==
- Electoral Action of Poles in Lithuania
- Russian Alliance, a splinter party from the Lithuanian Russian Union which also represented the Russian minority
