= Czesław =

- Pronunciation: [ˈt͡ʂɛs.waf]
- Gender: male
- Language: Polish

Origin
- Language: Slavic
- Derivation: ča- + slav[a]
- Meaning: "to await" + "glory"
- Region of origin: Poland

Other names
- Alternative spelling: Česlav, Časlav
- Nicknames: Czesiu, Czesiek

Czesław, (Czech: Česlav, Belarusian: Časłaŭ; Česłaŭ, Lithuanian: Česlovas) is an old given name derived from the Slavic elements ča- (to await) and slava (glory). Feminine form: Czesława/Česlava. The name may refer to:

- Ceslaus, Christian Saint
- Czesław Białobrzeski, Polish physicist
- Czesław Bieżanko, Polish entomologist and recognized authority on South American butterflies
- Czesław Bobrowski, Polish economist in postwar Poland
- Czeslaw Brzozowicz, consulting engineer for the CN Tower, Toronto-Dominion Centre, first Toronto subway line
- Czesław Dźwigaj, Polish artist and sculptor
- Czesław Hoc, Polish politician
- Czeslaw Idzkiewicz, Polish painter and teacher
- Czeslaw Kozon, Roman Catholic bishop of the Diocese of Copenhagen
- Czesław Kiszczak, Polish general and politician
- Czesław Lang, Polish former road racing cyclist
- Czesław Łuczak, Polish historian, former rector of the Adam Mickiewicz University
- Czesław Marchaj, Polish yachtsman
- Czesław Marek, Polish composer, pianist
- Czesław Meyer, a fictional character who gained immortality in the Japanese light novel series Baccano!
- Czesław Michniewicz, Polish football manager and former player
- Czesław Miłosz, Polish poet and Nobel Prize recipient
- Czesław Młot-Fijałkowski, a Polish military officer and a brigadier general of the Polish Army
- Czesław Niemen, Polish singer-songwriter
- Czesław Okińczyc, Polish–Lithuanian politician
- Czesław Piątas, a Polish general, former Chief of General Staff of the Polish Army
- Czesław Ratka (born 1952), Polish engineer and translator
- Czesław Słania, Polish-Swedish postage stamp and banknote engraver
- Czesław Sobieraj, Polish sprint canoer
- Czesław Warsewicz, former CEO and chairman of PKP Intercity S.A.
- Czesław Wycech, Polish activist, politician and historian
- Czesław Zbierański, Polish engineer, pioneer of Polish aviation, major of Polish Army

== See also ==
- Časlav (name)
