= Česlovas Sasnauskas =

Lithuanian composer

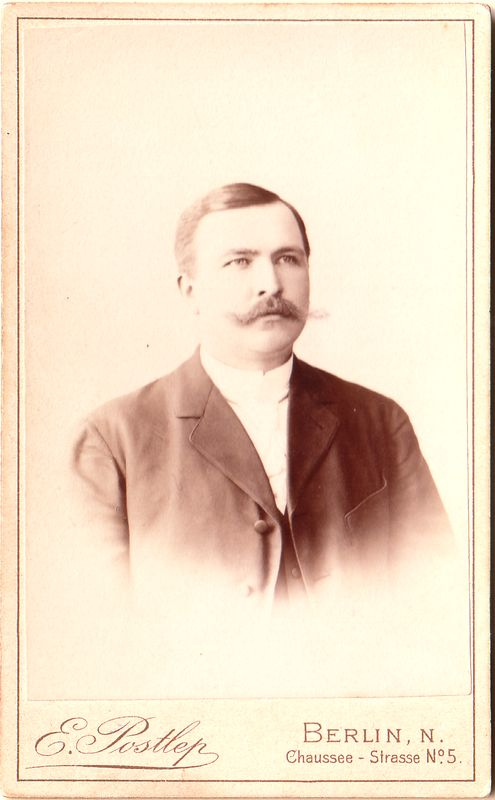

Česlovas Sasnauskas (Polish: Czesław Sosnowski; 19 July 1867, in Kapčiamiestis – 18 January 1916, in Saint Petersburg) was a Lithuanian composer.

Sasnauskas worked as an organist in Vilkaviškis and also played in Saint Petersburg upon relocating there in 1891.

Besides two requiems and several cantatas, he composed many pieces for organ and published his arrangements of Lithuanian folksongs, as well as a collection of his own songs in the folk idiom.
