= Časlav Đorđević =

Serbian writer

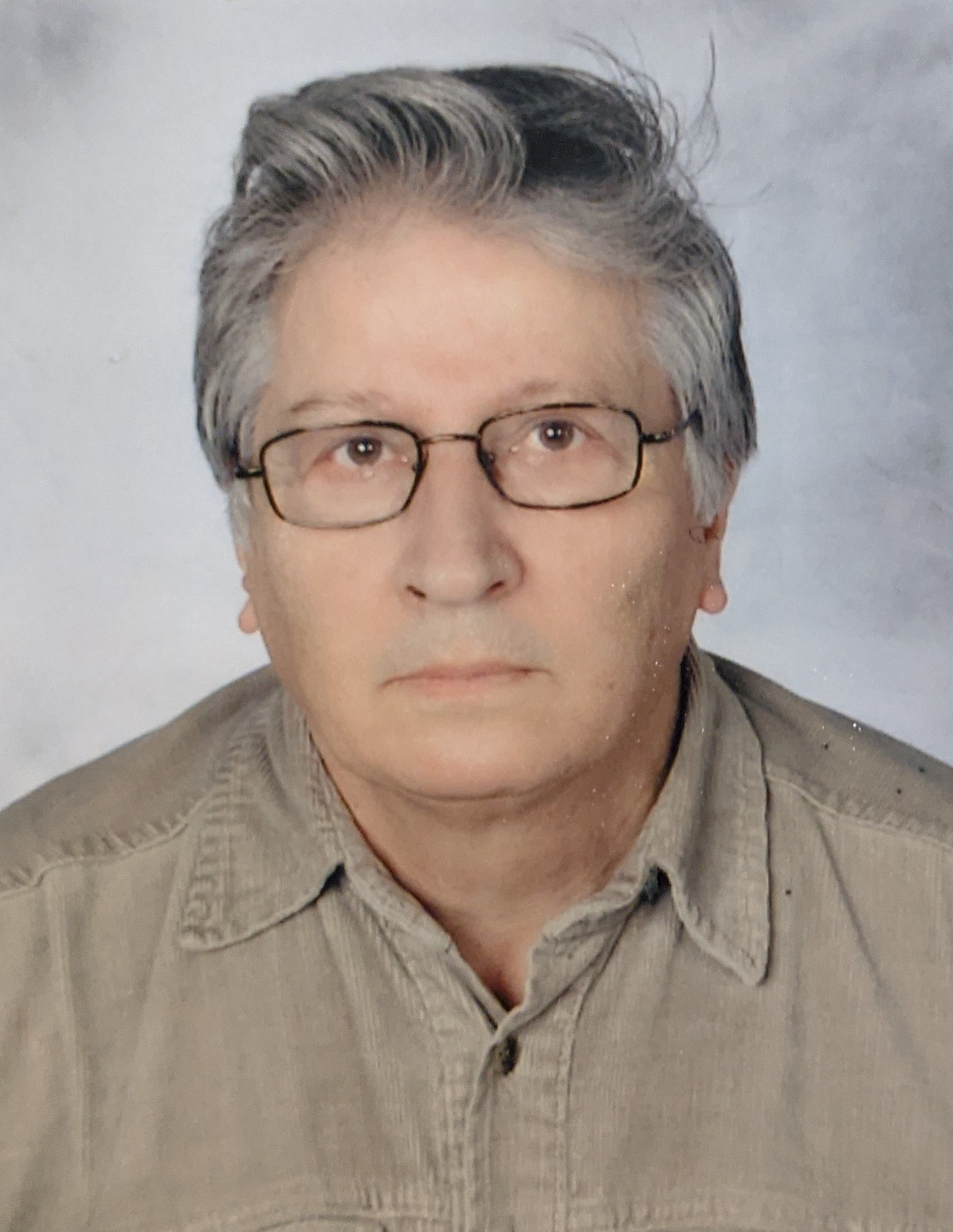
Časlav Đorđević

Časlav Đorđević (Serbian Cyrillic: Часлав Ђорђевић; born 16 February 1942) is a Serbian writer and a member of the Association of Writers of Serbia. He has written literary critiques and essays, and compiled anthologies of Serbian poetry. He is the author of two books of poetry, and a contributor to literary journals.
