= Zbignev Balcevič =

Polish-Lithuanian politician

Zbignev Balcevič (pol. Zbigniew Balcewicz; born 27 July 1946) is a Lithuanian politician. In 1990 he was among those who signed the Act of the Re-Establishment of the State of Lithuania.

Born in Zaviasai, Vilnius Region, to a Lithuanian Polish family. From 1988–1995 he was the editor in chief of Czerwony Sztandar (Red Flag, now Kurier Wileński), a Polish-language newspaper published in Vilnius.
