= Kurier Wileński =

Polish-language newspaper in Lithuania

Coordinates: 54.662264°N 25.303187°E

- Type: Daily newspaper
- Format: A4
- Owner: VšĮ "Kurier Wilenski"
- Publisher: UAB "Klion"
- Editor: Robert Mickiewicz
- Staff writers: 24
- Founded: 1796
- Language: Polish language
- Headquarters: Vilnius, Lithuania
- Circulation: 2,500 daily 3,500 Saturday
- Price: 0.40 EUR
- ISSN: 1392-0405
- Website: kurierwilenski.lt

Kurier Wileński (literally: Vilnian Courier) is the main Polish-language newspaper in Lithuania. Printed in Vilnius, it is the only Polish-language daily newspaper published east of Poland. A direct descendant of both the 19th-century newspaper of the same name and the Czerwony Sztandar newspaper, created by the Soviet authorities in 1953 as a means of Sovietization of the Polish diaspora left in the Polish areas annexed by the Soviet Union. The newspaper is a member of the European Association of Daily Newspapers in Minority and Regional Languages (MIDAS). According to TNS Gallup media research, Kurier Wileński 36,800 people or 1.4% of Lithuania's population read at least one issue out of the last six in summer 2008, but that measure dropped to 0.3% in spring 2010.

== History ==
=== Early history ===
The newspaper was first founded under the name of Kurier Litewski in 1796 in Grodno (modern Hrodna). The following year it moved to Vilna (modern Vilnius, Lithuania), where it became one of the principal sources of information for the local population. After the November Uprising of 1831, the newspaper was ordered to prepare a Russian language version as well, and served the role of the official newspaper of the Russian authorities of Vilna Governorate. However, it also fulfilled an important role in countering the Russification of local Poles.

In 1840 the newspaper was renamed to Kurier Wileński and attracted many notable Polish writers and journalists of the era as one of the very few relatively free newspapers in the lands ruled by the Russian Empire. Among them was Władysław Syrokomla and Antoni Odyniec. The newspaper was closed down and banned after the failed January Uprising of 1863.

It was relaunched under the title of Kurier Litewski after the Revolution of 1905. Headed by Eliza Orzeszkowa, it promoted Polish literature and culture, for which it was closed down several times by the Tsarist authorities. The title remained until the outbreak of World War I and the German occupation of Vilna in 1915.

During the interbellum the Polish press was no longer persecuted by the local authorities and the title was continued as one of several newspapers, the most important local newspapers being Słowo (headed by Stanisław Cat Mackiewicz), Robotnik Wileński and Express Wileński. Altogether, there were 114 newspapers published in Wilno in late 1930s, among them 17 dailies. 74 titles were being published in Polish, 16 in Yiddish and Hebrew, 12 in Belarusian, 9 in Lithuanian and 3 in Russian.

After the Invasion of Poland of 1939 and the Soviet annexation of Vilna, Kurier Wileński was closed down (the last issue was dated September 18, 1939). The only newspaper that was allowed by the Soviet authorities was Belarusian-language Vilenskaya Prauda (Віленская праўда). After the city was transferred to Lithuania, Kurier Wileński was allowed to be published, this time under heavy control of the Lithuanian authorities and censorship. It was again closed down after the city was annexed by the Soviet Union and its role was taken over by roughly 73 underground newspapers published in the city during the rest of World War II.

=== Czerwony Sztandar ===
After the war most of the local inhabitants of Vilnius were expelled from the city. However, a sizeable Polish minority in Lithuania remained. The Polish-language newspaper Czerwony Sztandar (Red Banner), edited by Antoni Fiedorowicz, was established.

In 1962, Leonid Romanowicz became the new editor in chief. Although Russian himself, Romanowicz was fascinated by the Polish culture and started to attract many notable journalists and writers. He also promoted the newspaper and it became the only daily newspaper in Polish available to many Poles in the Soviet Union. With time Russian staff was replaced by Poles and in 1984 Stanisław Jakutis became the new editor in chief.

=== In independent Lithuania ===
On November 1, 1988, Stanisław Jakutis was replaced by Zbigniew Balcewicz, who wanted to rename the newspaper back to Kurier Wileński to reflect the historic traditions. The first attempt to rename the daily was dismissed at the 20th Assembly of the Bureau of the Central Committee of the Communist Party of Lithuania as a "newspaper with such name was being published during the period between World Wars, when Vilnius region was under Polish occupation". Only after second attempt, made after publication by Lithuanian scientist about the roots of Kurier Wileński and the history of Lithuanian press, Czerwony Sztandar ceased to exist and was replaced by Kurier Wileński on February 9, 1990.

On February 23, 1990, the Bureau of the Central Committee of the Communist Party of Lithuania and Chair of the Supreme Soviet of the Lithuanian SSR issued a statement, of which 3rd point stated, that "In order to reflect the opinions of representatives of various nationalities and social classes of the Republic, we state that Sovietskaya Litva and Kurier Wileński are the newspapers of the Supreme Soviet of Lithuania and the Council of Ministers of Lithuania". On May 2, special issue of the newspaper was issued and Dziennik KC KP Litwy (The daily of the Central Committee of the Communist Party of Lithuania) was removed from the paper's front page.

In 1995, the newspaper was privatised by its staff and in upcoming turmoil almost went bankrupt. It was taken over by UAB "Klion", and, after being reorganised and modernised, was moved to the new quarters. In 2000 it was passed to non-profit publisher Vilnijos Žodis.

== Structure ==
The newspaper does not financially sustain itself and relies on support from the Polish Senate. According to press reports in 2007, the daily received approximately 120,000 litas annually to cover paper and printing costs from the Polish Senate and 4,000 litas monthly from Vilnius city municipality for advertising. In 2011, the daily suffered large financial losses due to increased postage costs, shrinking readership, and overall economic downturn. It considered publishing only three issues a week, but Polish Ministry of Foreign Affairs promised to find enough funding to keep the newspaper on a daily schedule. The Polish support during the first ten months amounted to 328,000 Polish zloty.

Kurier Wileński has its own printing shop, which proved to be more cost effective. Its current circulation is between 2,500 and 3,500, issued Tuesday through Saturday. Daily issues have 16 pages, while Saturday issues have 24 pages and a TV supplement. Gazeta Harcerska (Scout's gazette) is a weekly page about Polish scouts is written exclusively by the scouts.

The staff consists of 24 people, including printing-shop's workers and management. There are four full-time journalists, four half-time journalists and seven freelancers.

== Other activities ==
During the Perestroika and the dissolution of the USSR, Czerwony Sztandar and later Kurier Wileński led numerous social campaigns. Among them were campaigns against demolition of the Rasos Cemetery and for creation of Polish kindergartens to prevent the growing Lithuanization of Polish children.

Kurier Wileński is also, along with Gazeta Wyborcza, responsible for media coverage of the festival Kaziuki Wilniuki (inspired by Kaziuko mugė in Vilnius) held annually on March 3 to 6 in Lidzbark Warmiński.

On August 5, 2005, journalists of Kurier Wileński, together with colleagues from newspapers Tygodnik Wileńszczyzny and Magazyn Wileński, radio station Znad Wilii, quarterly Znad Wilii and TV program Album Wileński organised a protest in front of the Belarusian embassy in Vilnius against repressions of Polish journalists in Belarus.

On October 17, 2008, the daily switched to the F4 format (before that Kurier Wileński was published in the tabloid format).

== Controversies ==
Much of controversy surrounds the daily regarding its financial status and takeover by UAB "Klion". Also, there are conflicts with Lithuanian nationalists who regard Lithuanian Poles as merely Polonised Lithuanians.

=== Article by Krzysztof Buchowski ===
In November 2006, Kurier Wileński published an article by Krzysztof Buchowski, Polish historian from the Białystok University, about Polish and Lithuanian relations between the world wars (Polish: Jak Polak widział Litwina w okresie międzywojennym). It was a reprint of a thesis presented during a Polish–Lithuanian historical conference (Polish: Stosunki polsko-litewskie na przestrzeni wieków) at Vilnius University.

In January 2007 (before municipal elections, in which Polish party also participated), Lithuanian TV program Savaitės komentarai on the TV3 station sparked a scandal claiming that the article was insulting the Lithuanians. Information about the article was passed on to the Lithuanian Ethics Committee of Journalists and Publishers (Lithuanian: Lietuvos žurnalistų ir leidėjų etikos komisija), which decided on March 19, 2007, that Kurier Wileński acted unethically publishing an article that was derogatory and insulting to the Lithuanians. The daily lost the appeal with the Committee and sued in the Lithuanian courts. The court rejected the appeal in April 2011. Kurier Wileński then submitted the case to the European Court of Human Rights.

== See also ==
- Eastern Bloc information dissemination
