= Čáslavsko =

- Municipality
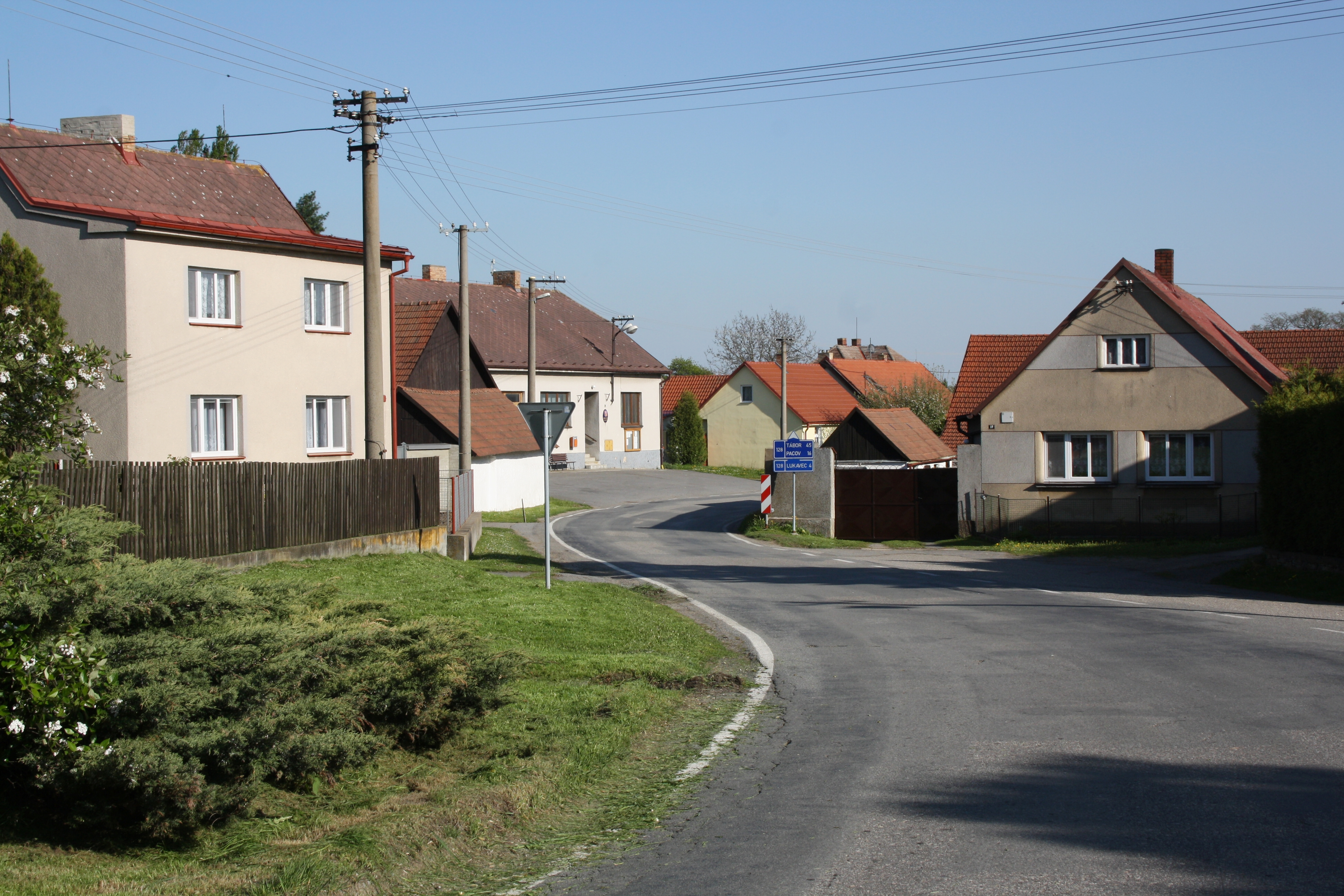
- Main street

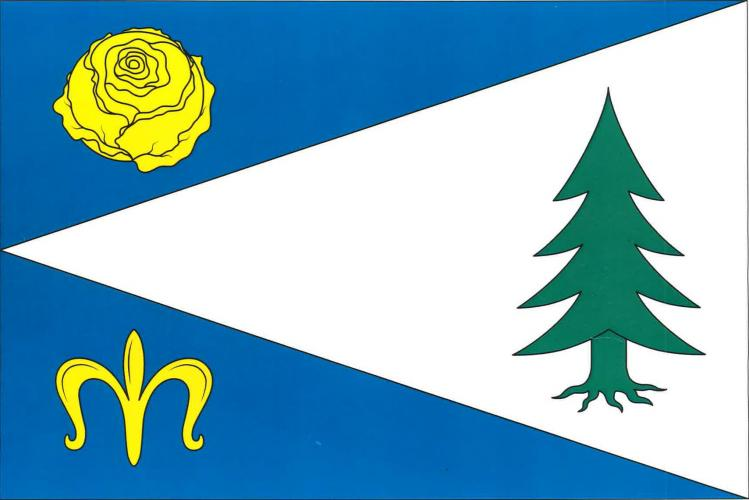
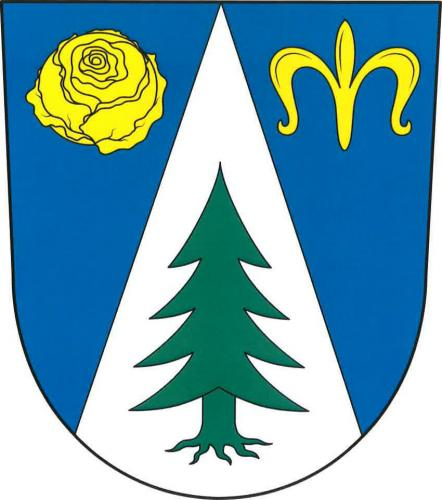
- Flag Coat of arms

- Location in the Czech Republic
- Coordinates: 49°35′33″N 15°0′10″E
- Country: Czech Republic
- Region: Vysočina
- District: Pelhřimov
- First mentioned: 1545

Area
  - Total: 9.57 km^{2} (3.69 sq mi)
- Elevation: 578 m (1,896 ft)

Population (2026-01-01)
  - Total: 107
  - Density: 11.2/km^{2} (29.0/sq mi)
- Time zone: UTC+1 (CET)
  - Summer (DST): UTC+2 (CEST)
- Postal code: 395 01
- Website: www.obec-caslavsko.cz

Čáslavsko (German: Tschaslawsko) is a municipality and village in Pelhřimov District in the Vysočina Region of the Czech Republic. It has about 100 inhabitants.

Čáslavsko lies approximately 24 kilometres (15 mi) north-west of Pelhřimov, 48 km (30 mi) north-west of Jihlava, and 69 km (43 mi) south-east of Prague.

== Administrative division ==
Čáslavsko consists of five municipal parts (in brackets population according to the 2021 census):

- Čáslavsko (50)
- Jelenov (6)
- Kopaniny (21)
- Skočidolovice (10)
- Štědrovice (21)

== Demographics ==
Historical population
Year	Pop.	±%
1869	804	—
1880	731	−9.1%
1890	746	+2.1%
1900	669	−10.3%
1910	659	−1.5%
1921	630	−4.4%
1930	559	−11.3%
1950	408	−27.0%
1961	391	−4.2%
1970	361	−7.7%
1980	261	−27.7%
1991	173	−33.7%
2001	116	−32.9%
2011	107	−7.8%
2021	108	+0.9%
Source: Censuses
