= Mickūnai =

Mickūnai Mickuny
- Town
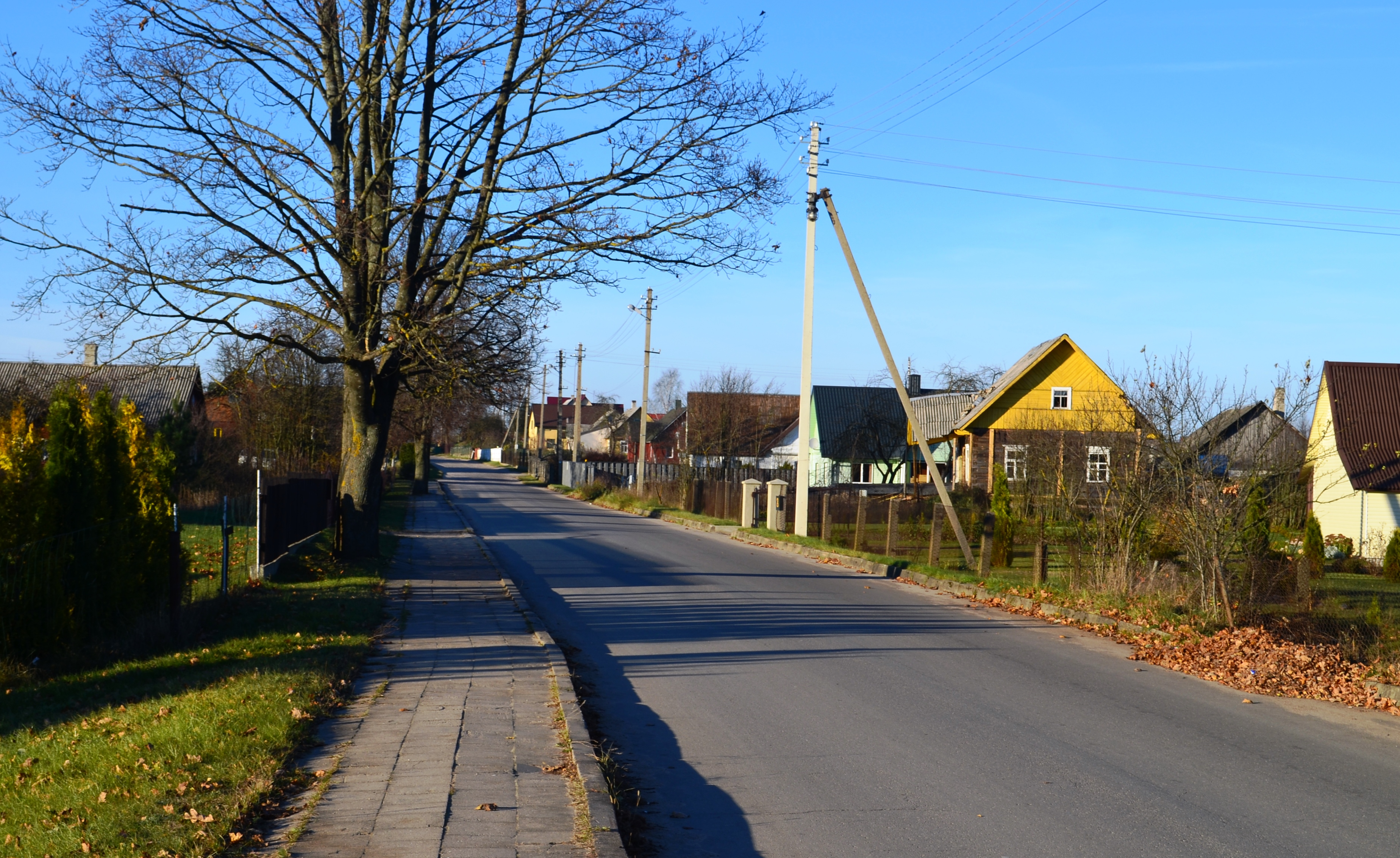

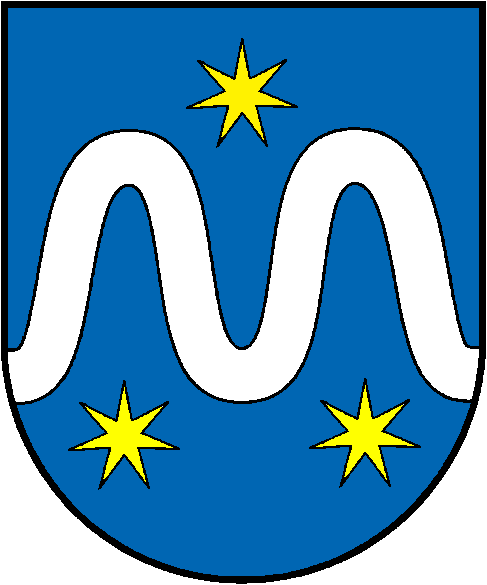
- Coat of arms

- Location within Lithuania
- Coordinates: 54°42′10″N 25°30′40″E
- Country: Lithuania
- County: Vilnius County
- Municipality: Vilnius

Population (2021)
  - Total: 1,420
- Time zone: UTC+2 (EET)
  - Summer (DST): UTC+3 (EEST)

Mickūnai (Polish: Mickuny) is a town in Vilnius district municipality, in Vilnius County, in southeast Lithuania, it is located only about 4 kilometres (2.5 mi) north-east of Vilnius city municipality. According to the 2011 census, the town has a population of 1,389 people.
