= Česlav Olševski =

Lithuanian politician

Member of the Seimas
- Incumbent
- Assumed office 2016
- Constituency: Medininkų (No: 57) in the electoral constituency

Personal details
- Born: June 26, 1961 (age 65) Petruliškės Village, Vilnius District, Lithuania
- Education: Mykolas Romeris University

Česlav Olševski is a Lithuanian politician and a member of the Seimas.

== Biography ==
He was elected in 2016 and re-elected in 2020.
