= Sudervė =

- Village
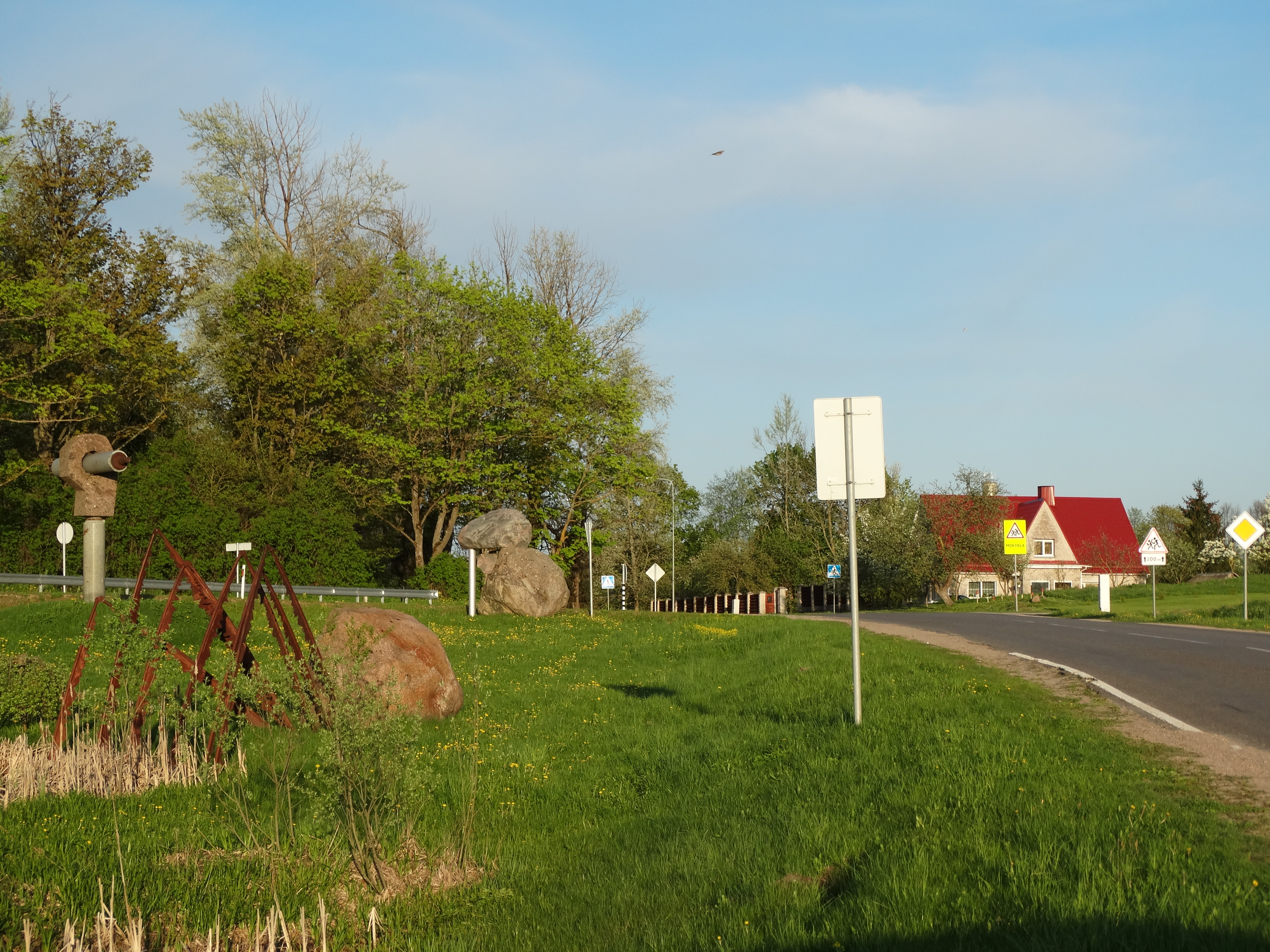
- Entering Sudervė village

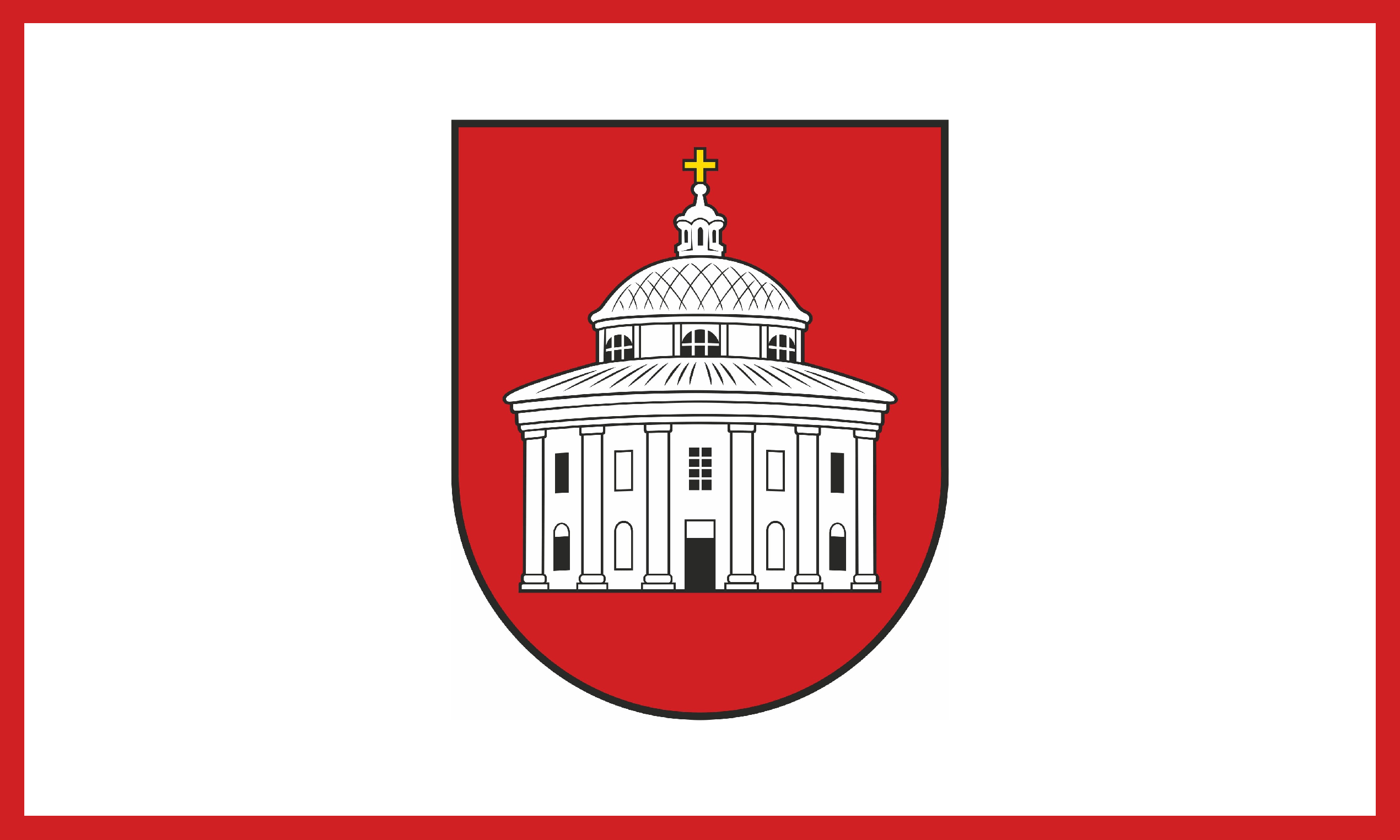
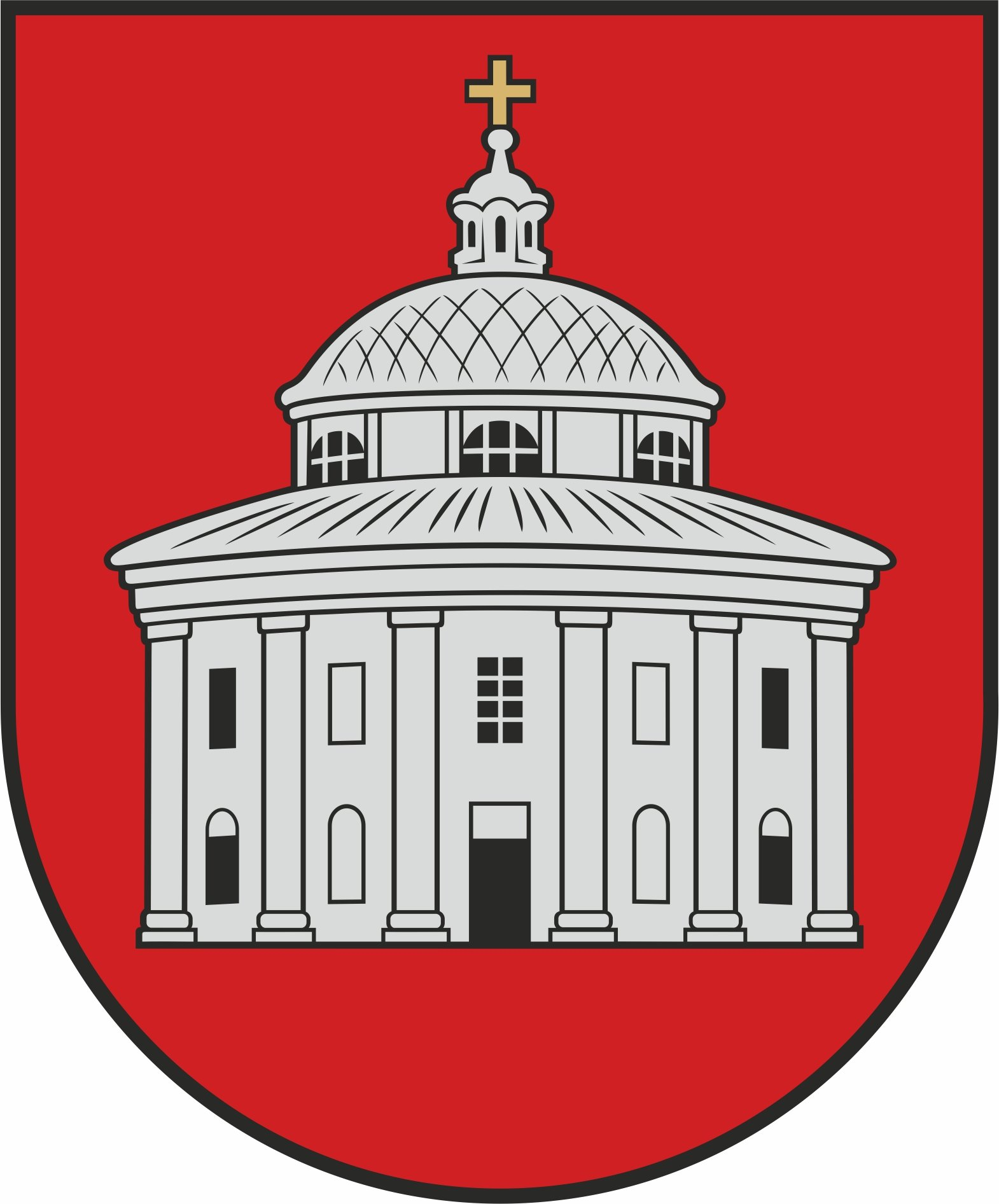
- Flag Coat of arms

- Location of Sudervė
- Coordinates: 54°46′52″N 25°05′38″E
- Country: Lithuania
- County: Vilnius County
- Municipality: Vilnius District Municipality
- Eldership: Sudervė eldership

Population (2021)
  - Total: 588
- Time zone: UTC+2 (EET)
  - Summer (DST): UTC+3 (EEST)

Sudervė is one of the oldest villages in Vilnius District Municipality, Lithuania, it is located only about 8 kilometres (5.0 mi) west of Vilnius city municipality. It is located just north of Vilnius, on the road from Vilnius to Kernavė and is the center of Sudervė eldership. At the 2011 census, the village had a population of 523 and grew to 588 as of 2021 census. That was an increase from the 1989 census which recorded the population of 393 inhabitants.

== History ==
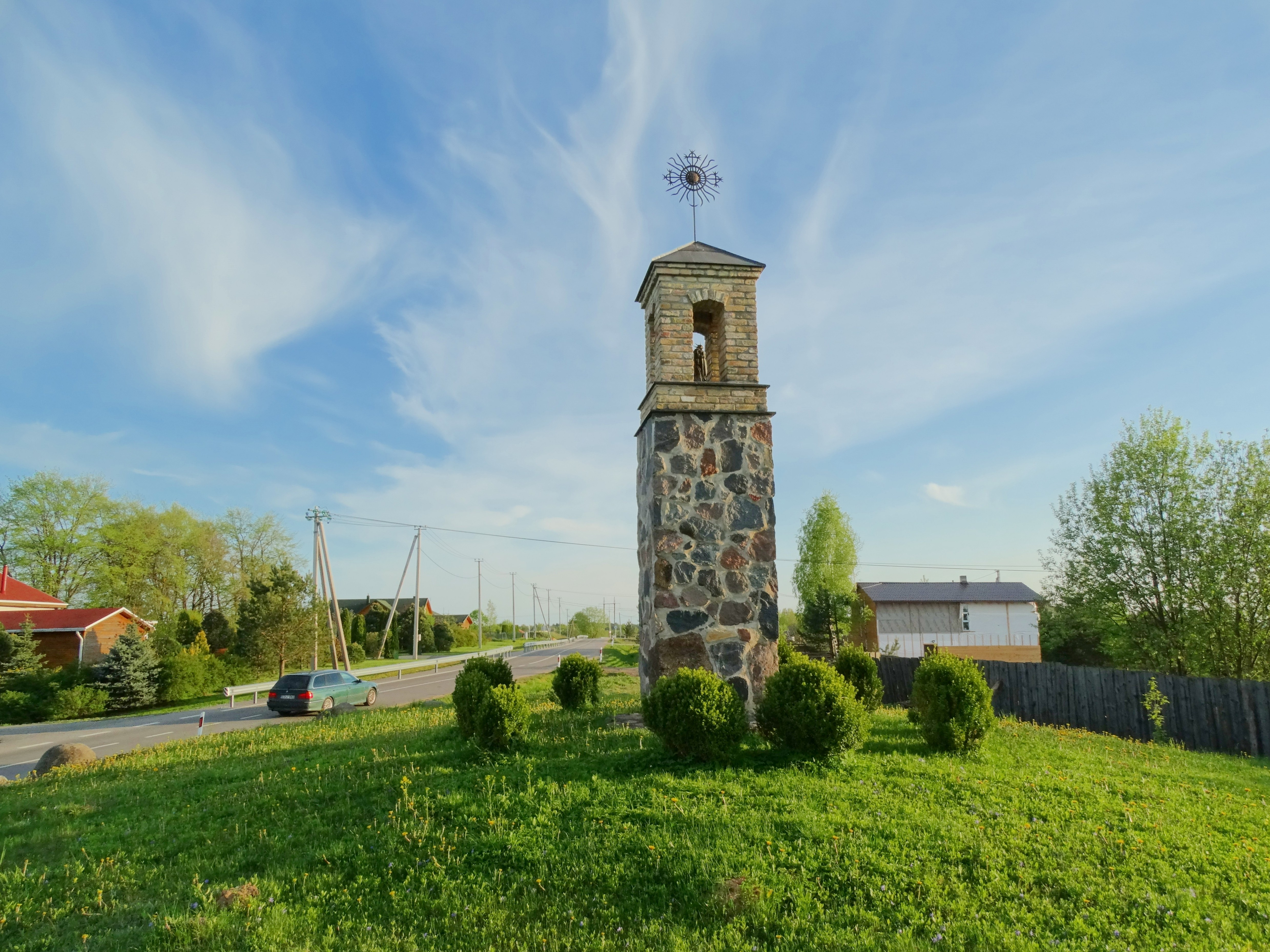
Catholic tower chapel in Sudervė

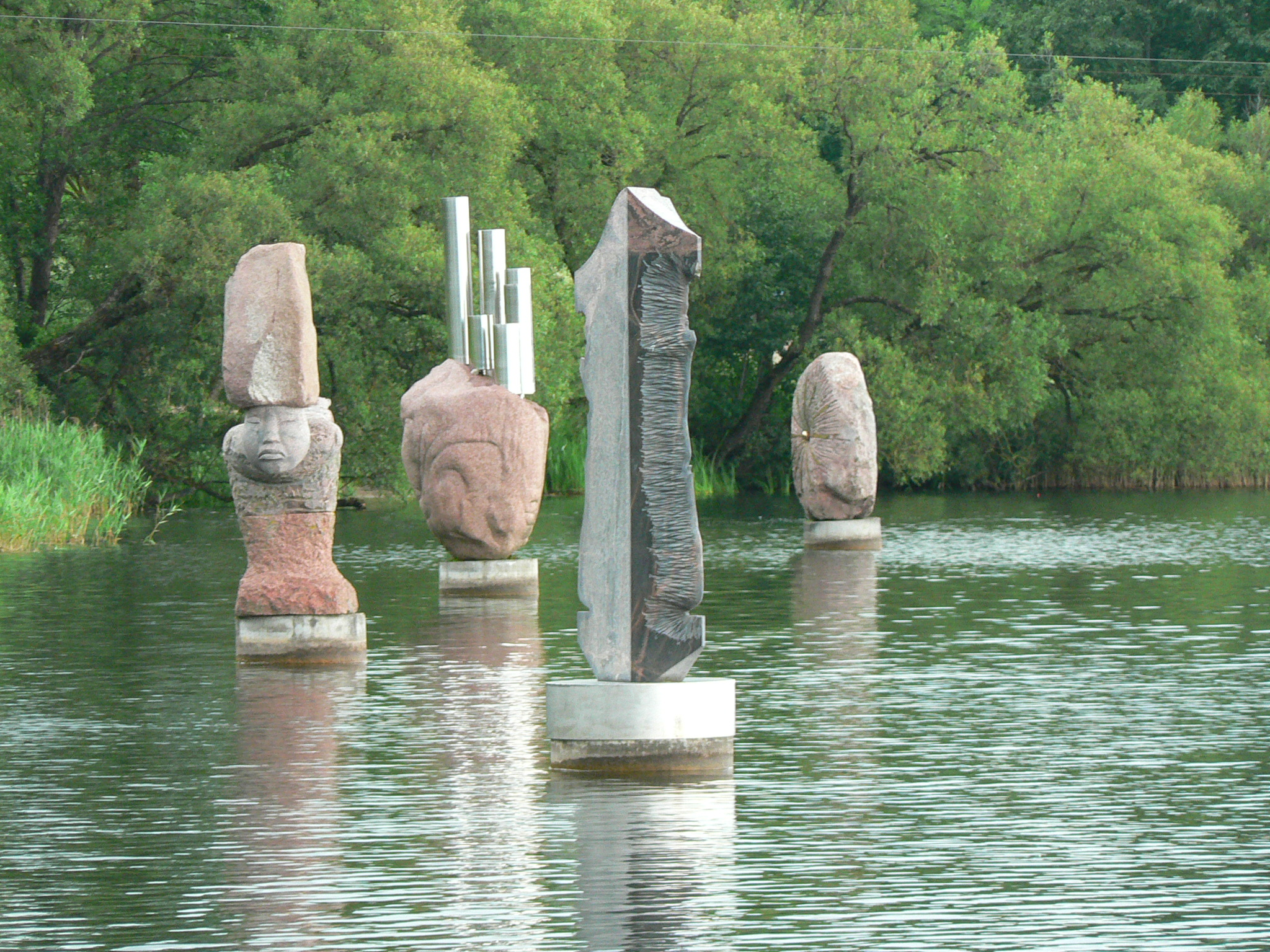
Stone sculptures in Vilnoja lake in Sudervė stone sculpture park

In 1594, Sudervė was given to the Orthodox St. Trinity Brotherhood of Vilnius, but was sold to the Jesuit novitiate in 1669. Bishop Ignacy Jakub Massalski bought Sudervė in the second half of the 18th century. Catholic church of a rare in Lithuania rotunda type was built in Sudervė in 1803–1822. Some historians attribute its project to Laurynas Gucevičius, while others argue, that it was built already after his death and the project was prepared independently by his student Laurynas Bortkevičius.

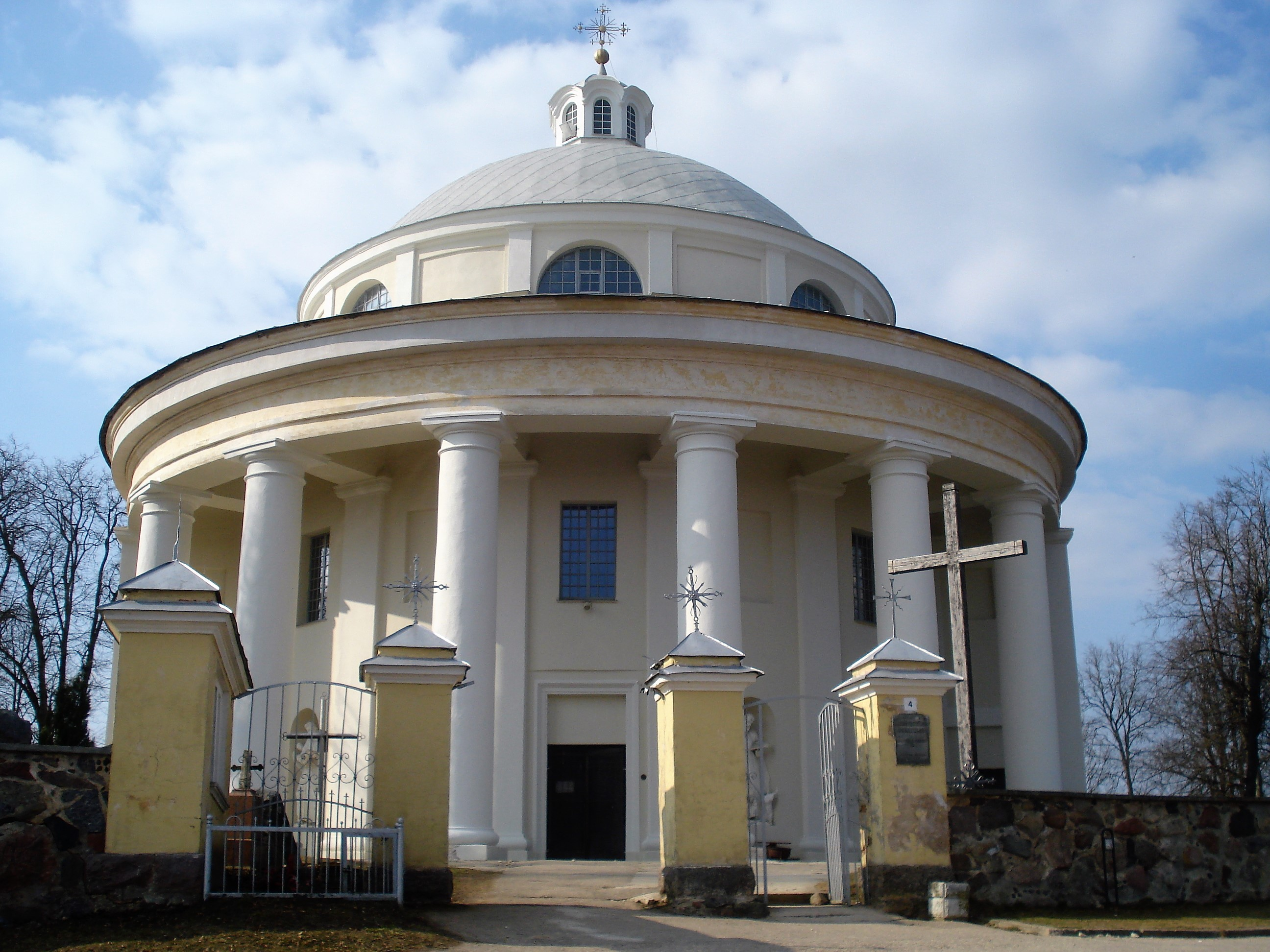
Catholic church in Sudervė

== Demography ==
Sudervė belongs to the suburban belt of Vilnius, which grew substantially during the last 20 years. New houses are being built in the village for newcomer residents from Vilnius. Because of this, ethnographic picture of the eldership is changing rapidly. According to the census of 2001, 88.5% of inhabitants out of population of 1,643 in the Sudervė eldership were Lithuanian Poles, 7.5% were Lithuanians, and 2.6% were Russians. In 2011 out of 2,382 inhabitants, Lithuanian Poles constituted 47.7%, Lithuanians – already 41.6%, Lithuanian Russians – 5.8%. According to the results of 2021 census, there were 2829 inhabitants in Sudervė eldership: 1421 Lithuanian, 1099 Poles, 144 Russians, 49 Belarusians, 15 Ukrainians, and 94 of other ethnicity. The percentage of Lithuanians increased to 50.2%, percentage of Poles decreased to 38.8%. These same tendencies persisted in the 2020s as well.
