= Česlav Okinčic =

Polish-Lithuanian politician

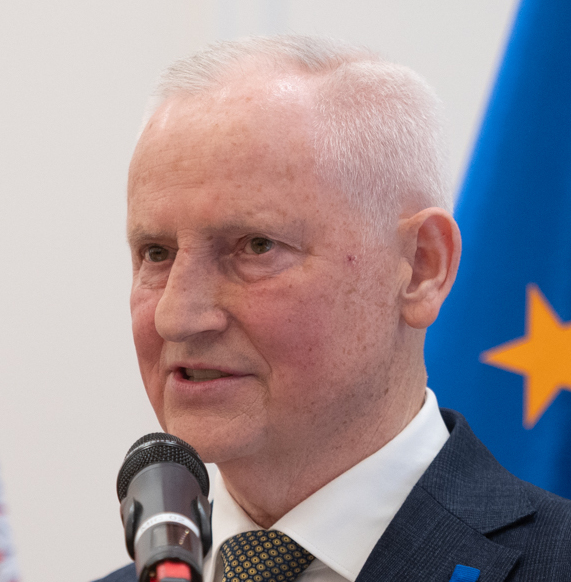
Okinčic in 2026

Česlav Okinčic (Polish: Czesław Okińczyc; born 13 September 1955) is a Polish-Lithuanian lawyer and politician, born in Vilnius. He graduated from Vilnius University in 1982. In 1990 he was among those who signed the Act of the Re-Establishment of the State of Lithuania.
