= Union of Poles in Lithuania =

Polish organization based in Lithuania

Union of Poles in Lithuania (Polish: Związek Polaków na Litwie, ZPL; Lithuanian: Lietuvos lenkų sąjunga) is an organization formed in 1989 to bring together members of Polish minority in Lithuania. It numbers between 6,000 to 11,000 members. It defends the civil rights of the Polish minority and engages in educational, cultural and economic activities. It is the largest Polish organization in Lithuania, and was created in 1990.

Union of Poles in Lithuania was created at the first congress of Socio-Cultural Association of Poles (SSKPL) in Lithuania on 15–16 April 1989. SSKPL's chairman Jan Sienkiewicz proposed its transformation into a new organisation, in order to avoid accusations that a cultural organisation is engaging in political activities. The proposal was accepted, and the association has withdrawn from the Lithuanian Cultural Fund and transformed into the Union of Poles in Lithuania. Sienkiewicz became a chairman of the new organisation. At its second congress on April 22, 1990, the ZPL supported Lithuania's declaration of independence on March 11 of that year and declared its readiness to cooperate in building a free state.

ZPL organizes meetings ('Zjazdy' - 'congresses') of Polish minority, and publishes a magazine, Nasz Czas. The latter was created in 2001 through the merger of the former Association magazine, "Nasza Gazeta", Estonia's Polish minority magazine "Nasza Polonia" and the Latvian Polish minority magazine "Łatgalia". The publication is supported by Senate of Poland and The Foundation Aid to Poles in the East.

The Association is not engaged in political activities, leaving them to the Polish minority political party, the Electoral Action of Poles in Lithuania.

== Bibliography ==
- Jundo-Kaliszewska, Barbara (2019). Zakładnicy historii. Mniejszość polska w postradzieckiej Litwie [Hostages of history. The Polish minority in post-Soviet Lithuania] (in Polish). Łódź.
- Kosman, Michał M. (2001). "Polacy na Litwie wobec odrodzenia państwowości litewskiej" [Poles in Lithuania and the revival of Lithuanian statehood] (PDF). In Pająk, Kazimierz; Załubski, Jan (eds.). U schyłku tysiąclecia: księga pamiątkowa z okazji sześćdziesięciolecia urodzin Profesora Marcelego Kosmana. Poznań: Forum Naukowe. ISBN 8388544012.
