= List of people from Szczecin =

This is a list of notable people who were born in, lived in, or are otherwise associated with Szczecin, a city in northwestern Poland.

== Famous residents of Szczecin ==
Catherine the Great, Empress of Russia, born 1729

=== Before 1800 ===
- Philipp Dulichius (1562–1631), German composer
- Johan Casper Printz (1671–1746), Swedish naval officer
- Catherine the Great (1729–1796), empress of Russia
- Franz Kasimir von Kleist (1736–1808), Prussian general
- Sophie Dorothea of Württemberg (1759–1828), the second wife of Tsar Paul I of Russia
- Friedrich von Adelung (1768–1843), linguist, historian and bibliographer
- Friedrich Gilly (1772–1800), architect
- Henryka Beyer (1782–1855) painter
- Friedrich Graf von Wrangel (1784–1877), Prussian Field Marshal
- Carl Loewe (1796–1869) composer, lived in Stettin
- Heinrich Philipp August Damerow (1798–1866), psychiatrist
- Karl Loeillot (1798–1864), painter and lithographer

=== 1800–1850 ===
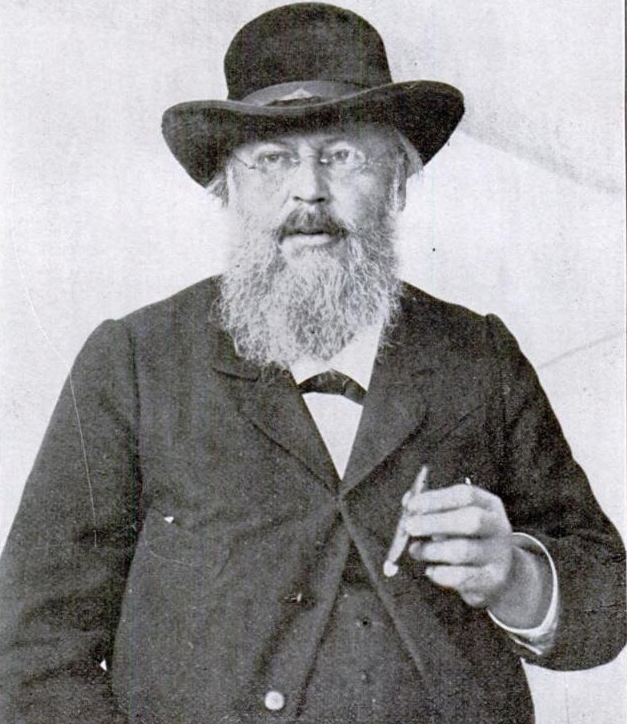
Felix Anton Dohrn

- Theodor Hildebrandt (1804–1874) painter
- Carl August Dohrn (1806–1892), entomologist
- Franz Theodor Kugler (1808–1858) art historian
- Carl Gustav Friedrich Hasselbach (1809–1882), mayor of Magdeburg
- Hermann Günther Grassmann (1809–1877) mathematician, physicist and linguist
- Robert Prutz (1816–1872) poet
- Franz San Galli (1824–1908), inventor of radiator (central heating system)
- Hermann Julius Grüneberg (1827–1894), chemist
- Felicita Vestvali (1831-1880), opera singer and actress
- Karl Heinrich von Boetticher (1833-1907), politician and statesman
- A. F. Marx (1838–1904), publisher
- Anton Dohrn (1840–1909) first director of the Stazione Zoologica, Naples, Italy
- Otto von Gierke (1841–1921) historian
- Oscar Hammerstein I (1847–1919), composer

=== 1850–1900 ===
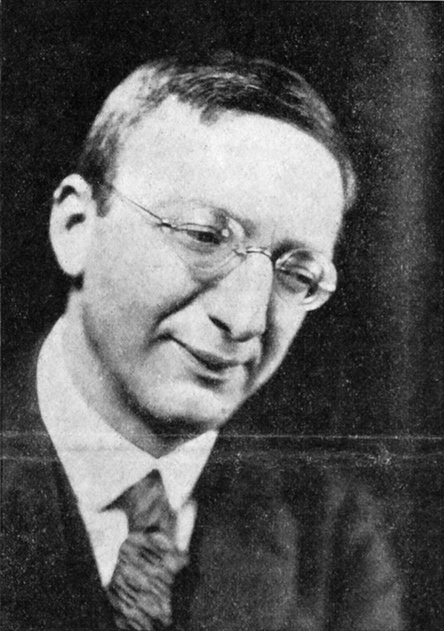
Alfred Doeblin, 1930

- Ernst Zitelmann (1852–1923) jurist
- Carl Ludwig Schleich (1859–1922), author
- Max Berg (1870–1947) architect
- Leon Jessel (1871–1942), composer
- Wolfgang Wegener (1875–1956), officer in the Imperial German Navy
- Alfred Döblin (1878–1957), writer
- Traugott Konstantin Oesterreich (1880–1949), religious parapsychologist and philosopher
- Fritz Gerlich (1883–1934) journalist
- Rudolf Olden (1885–1940), journalist and lawyer
- Johannes Theodor Baargeld (1892–1927) painter and poet
- Heinrich George (1893–1946), actor
- Erich Böhlke (1895–1979), conductor and componist
- Karl Weinbacher (1898–1946), German manager and war criminal
- Hans Heinrich von Twardowski (1898–1958) film actor
- Heinrich Pick (1882-1947) jurist

=== 1900–1945 ===
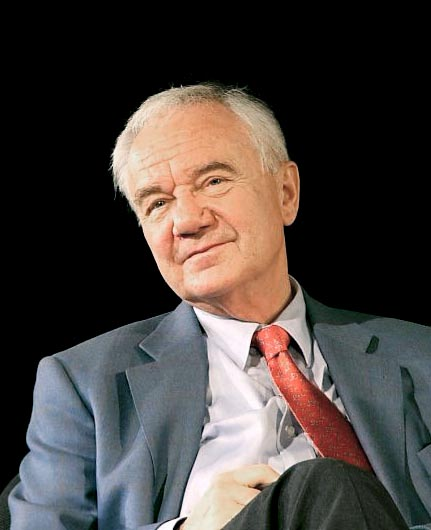
Manfred Stolpe, Prime minister of Brandenburg, born 1936

- Hans Kammler (1901–1945), German general
- Werner Seelenbinder (1904–1944) politician
- Gustav Gerneth (1905-2019) the world's oldest living man
- Konstanty Ildefons Gałczyński (1905–1953), poet
- Erwin Ackerknecht (1906–1988), historian
- Dita Parlo (1906–1971) film actress
- Kurt Kuhnke (1910—1969), motorcyclist
- Ernst Bader (1914–1999) actor and songwriter
- Jürgen Dethloff (1924–2002), inventor
- Helga Deen (1925–1943) Dutch prison camp diarist
- Wolfhart Pannenberg (1928–2014), Christian theologian
- Thomas Geve (1929–2024), engineer, author and Jewish Holocaust survivor
- Ellen Schwiers (1930–2019), actress of stage, film, and television
- Rudi Strahl (1931–2001), playwright, novelist and lyricist.
- Jan Stopyra (1934–2023), politician and economist, mayor of Szczecin
- Manfred Stolpe (1936–2019), former Prime Minister of Brandenburg
- Christian Tomuschat (born 1936), expert in international law, professor at the Humboldt University of Berlin
- Wolfgang Weber (born 1939), classical cellist
- Knut Kiesewetter (1941–2016) musician
- Michael Bürsch (1942–2012) politician
- Michael Holm (born 1943) singer-songwriter

=== After 1945 ===
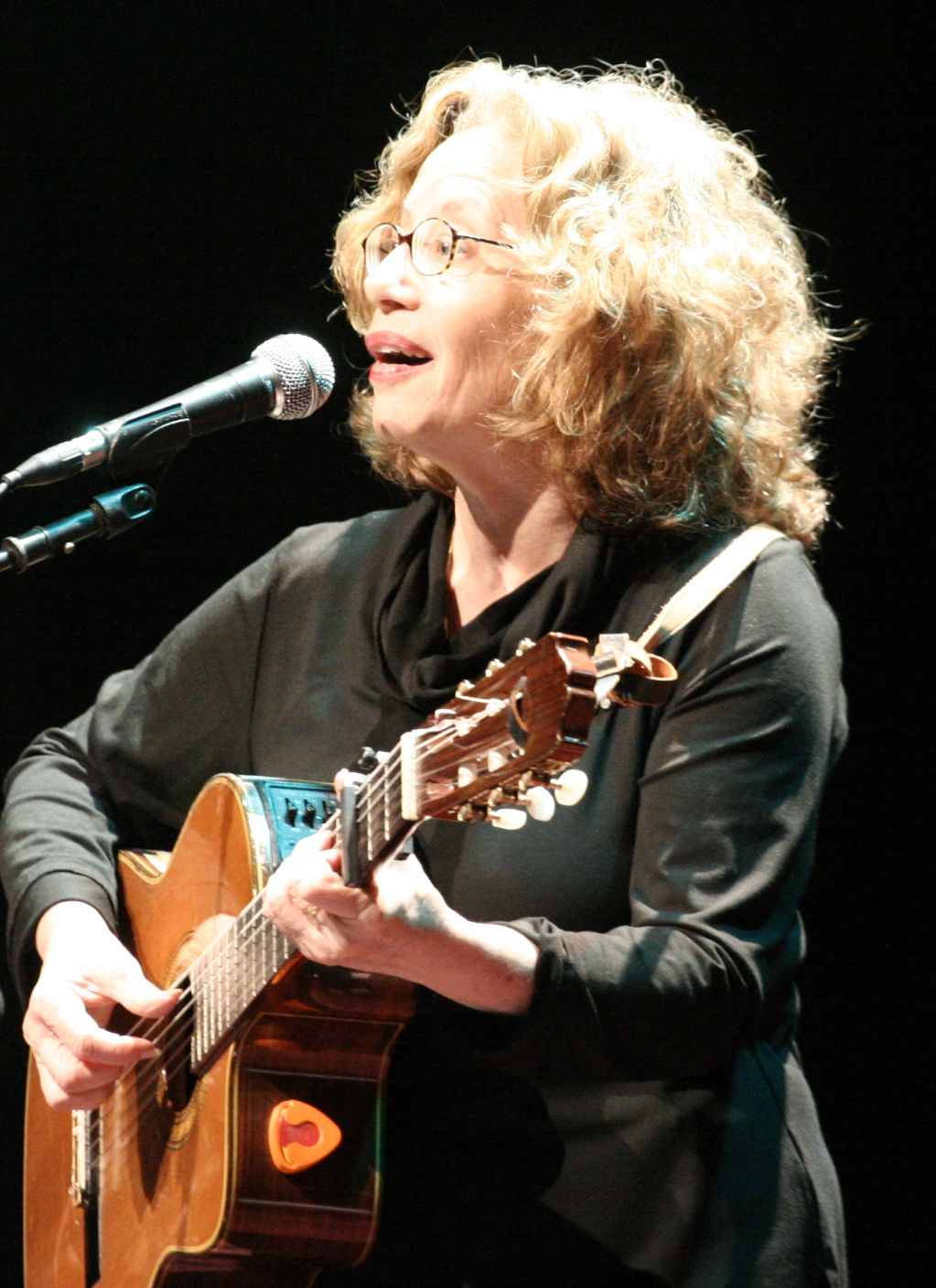
Chava Alberstein

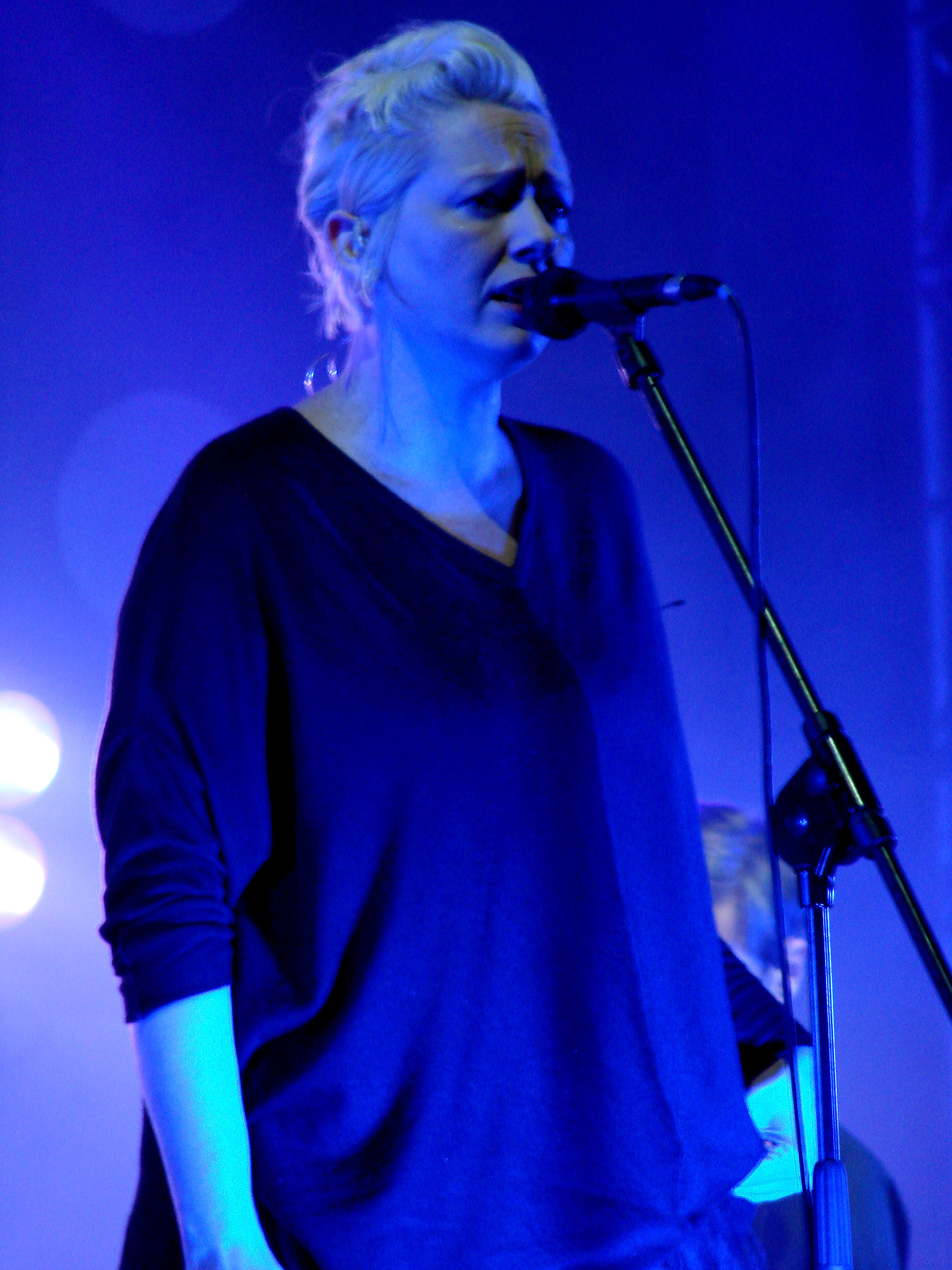
Kasia Nosowska

- Chava Alberstein (born 1947), Israeli female singer and composer of songs
- Piotr Andrejew (born 1947), Polish screenwriter and film director, born in Szczecin
- Franciszek Białous (1901–1980), Polish microbiologist, settled in Szczecin in 1946
- Ryszard Kotla (born 1947) historian, travel writer, journalist, engineer, born in Szczecin-Dąbie
- Inka Dowlasz (born 1949) Polish theater director, playwright, screenwriter, psychologist and teacher
- Jerzy Zielinski (born 1950) Polish cinematographer active in Hollywood
- Krzysztof Warlikowski (born 1962), Polish theatre director
- Aneta Kreglicka (born 1965), First runner-up Miss International 1989 and Miss World 1989
- Kasia Nosowska (born 1971), singer of Szczecin-based rock band Hey
- Agata Kulesza (born 1971), Polish actress
- Radosław Majdan (born 1972) Poland national goalkeeper
- Grzegorz Napieralski (born 1974), Polish left-wing politician
- Ilona Ostrowska (born 1974), Polish actress
- Maciej Jewtuszko (born 1981) Mixed Martial Artist, currently competes in WEC.
- Aleksandra Przegalińska (born 1982), Polish philosopher and futurist
- Cleo, (born 1983), singer who represented Poland at the Eurovision Song Contest 2014
- Marek Kowal (born 1985), Polish footballer
- Paul Ziemiak (born 1985), German politician (CDU)
- Izuagbe Ugonoh (born 1986), Polish-Nigerian mixed martial artist and boxer
- Marcin Lewandowski (born 1987), Polish middle-distance runner
- Klaudia Ungerman (born 1988), Miss Poland 2008
- Kamil Grosicki (born 1988), Polish footballer
- Rafał Janicki (born 1992), Polish footballer
- Bartosz Zmarzlik (born 1995), Polish motorcycle speedway rider
- Young Leosia (born 1998), Polish singer, rapper, songwriter and DJ
- Blanka Stajkow (born, 1999), Polish singer, fashion model
- Adam Rudawski (born 1966) Polish politician, economist, and academic professor
