= 1928 LFF Lyga =

LFF Lyga
- Season: 1928
- Champions: KSS Klaipėda
- Matches played: 65
- Longest unbeaten run: LFLS Kaunas (10 games)

The 1928 LFF Lyga was the 7th season of the LFF Lyga football competition in Lithuania. KSS Klaipėda won the championship.

== Kaunas Group ==
| Pos | Team | Pld | W | D | L | GF | GA | GD | Pts |
|---|---|---|---|---|---|---|---|---|---|
| 1 | LFLS Kaunas | 10 | 9 | 1 | 0 | 26 | 8 | +18 | 19 |
| 2 | KSK Kaunas | 10 | 6 | 3 | 1 | 21 | 8 | +13 | 15 |
| 3 | Kovas Kaunas | 10 | 4 | 2 | 4 | 20 | 19 | +1 | 10 |
| 4 | Sparta Kaunas | 10 | 3 | 1 | 6 | 20 | 20 | 0 | 7 |
| 5 | Makabi Kaunas | 10 | 2 | 2 | 6 | 10 | 19 | −9 | 6 |
| 6 | Kultus Kaunas | 10 | 1 | 1 | 8 | 7 | 30 | −23 | 3 |

Source: rsssf.com

== Klaipėda Group ==
=== North Division ===
| Pos | Team | Pld | W | D | L | GF | GA | GD | Pts |
|---|---|---|---|---|---|---|---|---|---|
| 1 | KSS Klaipėda | 8 | 7 | 0 | 1 | 29 | 15 | +14 | 14 |
| 2 | Spielvereiningung Klaipėda | 8 | 4 | 0 | 4 | 21 | 22 | −1 | 8 |
| 3 | SSK Klaipėda | 8 | 4 | 0 | 4 | 16 | 19 | −3 | 8 |
| 4 | Freya Klaipėda | 8 | 3 | 0 | 5 | 15 | 19 | −4 | 6 |
| 5 | Vorwarts Šilutė | 8 | 2 | 0 | 6 | 16 | 22 | −6 | 4 |

Source: rsssf.com

=== South Division ===
| Pos | Team | Pts |
|---|---|---|
| 1 | SV Pagėgiai | 18 |
| 2 | SV Stoniškiai | 16 |
| 3 | SV Pagėgiai-2 | 2 |
| 4 | SV Stoniškiai-2 | 2 |
| 5 | SV Gudai | 2 |

Source: RSSSF

=== Klaipėda Group Final ===
KSS Klaipėda beat Sportverein Pagėgiai

== Šiauliai Group ==
- LDS Šiauliai 6-0 Kraft Šiauliai
- ŠSK Šiauliai - Makabi Šiauliai
- LDS Šiauliai 5-1 SSK Šiauliai

== Final ==
- KSS Klaipėda 3-1 LFLS Kaunas

(Šiauliai Champion didn't arrive to Klaipėda.)
