= 1929 LFF Lyga =

LFF Lyga
- Season: 1929
- Champions: KSS Klaipėda
- Matches played: 46
- Goals scored: 227 (4.93 per match)
- Longest unbeaten run: KSS Klaipėda (8 games)

The 1929 LFF Lyga was the 8th season of the LFF Lyga football competition in Lithuania. It was contested by 11 teams, and KSS Klaipėda won the championship.

== Kaunas Group ==
Pos	Team	Pld	W	D	L	GF	GA	GD	Pts
1	LFLS Kaunas	10	8	0	2	35	6	+29	16
2	Kultus Kaunas	10	7	1	2	27	17	+10	15
3	Tauras Kaunas	10	5	2	3	27	22	+5	12
4	Kovas Kaunas	10	4	2	4	22	21	+1	10
5	Sparta Kaunas	10	2	2	6	11	35	−24	6
6	Makabi Kaunas	10	0	1	9	3	24	−21	1

Source: rsssf.com

== Klaipėda Group ==
Pos	Team	Pld	W	D	L	GF	GA	GD	Pts
1	KSS Klaipėda	8	7	1	0	43	3	+40	15
2	Freya Klaipėda	8	5	0	3	16	15	+1	10
3	Spielvereiningung Klaipėda	8	3	2	3	13	9	+4	8
4	SSK Klaipėda	8	3	1	4	18	21	−3	7
5	Vorwarts Šilutė	8	0	0	8	6	48	−42	0

Source: rsssf.com

== Final ==
- KSS Klaipėda 4-2 LFLS Kaunas
