= 1930 LFF Lyga =

LFF Lyga
- Season: 1930
- Champions: KSS Klaipėda
- Matches: 50
- Goals: 228 (4.56 per match)
- Longest unbeaten run: KSS Klaipėda (9 games)

The 1930 LFF Lyga was the 9th season of the LFF Lyga football competition in Lithuania. It was contested by 19 teams, and KSS Klaipėda won the championship.

== Kaunas Group ==
Pos	Team	Pld	W	D	L	GF	GA	GD	Pts
1	LFLS Kaunas	6	5	1	0	25	11	+14	11
2	Tauras Kaunas	6	3	1	2	15	14	+1	7
3	Kovas Kaunas	6	3	0	3	23	15	+8	6
4	LGSF Kaunas	6	3	0	3	12	14	−2	6
5	Makabi Kaunas	6	2	1	3	10	19	−9	5
6	Sparta Kaunas	6	2	0	4	11	18	−7	4
7	Kultus Kaunas	6	1	1	4	6	11	−5	3

Source: rsssf.com

== Klaipėda Group ==
Pos	Team	Pld	W	D	L	GF	GA	GD	Pts
1	KSS Klaipėda	6	5	1	0	23	6	+17	11
2	Spielvereiningung Klaipėda	6	4	0	2	14	12	+2	8
3	Freya Klaipėda	6	1	1	4	9	16	−7	3
4	MTV Klaipėda	6	1	0	5	3	15	−12	2

Source: rsssf.com

== Šiauliai Group ==
Pos	Team	Pld	W	D	L	GF	GA	GD	Pts
1	Makabi Šiauliai	6	4	1	1	18	4	+14	9
2	ŠSK Šiauliai	3	2	1	0	4	2	+2	5
3	Tempo Šiauliai	3	2	0	1	2	4	−2	4
4	LDS Šiauliai	6	2	0	4	4	14	−10	4
5	Žinia Siauliai	6	0	2	4	6	10	−4	2

Source: rsssf.com

== Sūduva Group ==
Pos	Team	Pld	W	D	L	GF	GA	GD	Pts
1	Sveikata Kybartai	2	2	0	0	17	1	+16	4
2	LFLS Marijampolė	2	1	0	1	1	8	−7	2
3	Tauras Vilkaviškis	2	0	0	2	0	9	−9	0

Source: rsssf.com

== Semifinal ==
- LFLS Kaunas 9-1 Sveikata Kybartai
- KSS Klaipėda 9-0 Makabi Šiauliai

== Final ==
- KSS Klaipėda 1-1; 3-1 LFLS Kaunas
