= Old Theatre of Vilnius =

Coordinates: 54.68087°N 25.27323°E

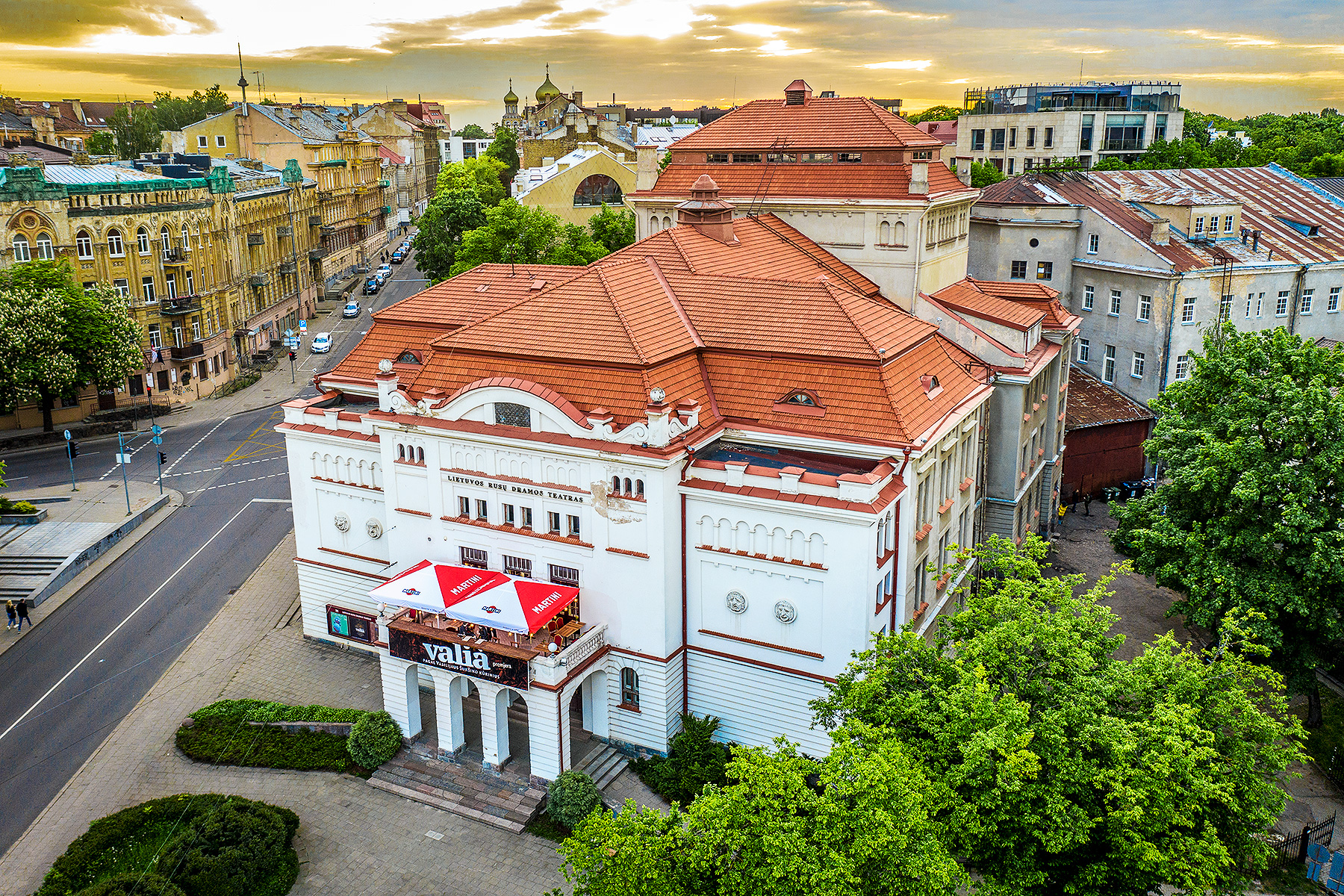
Aerial view of the theatre in 2021

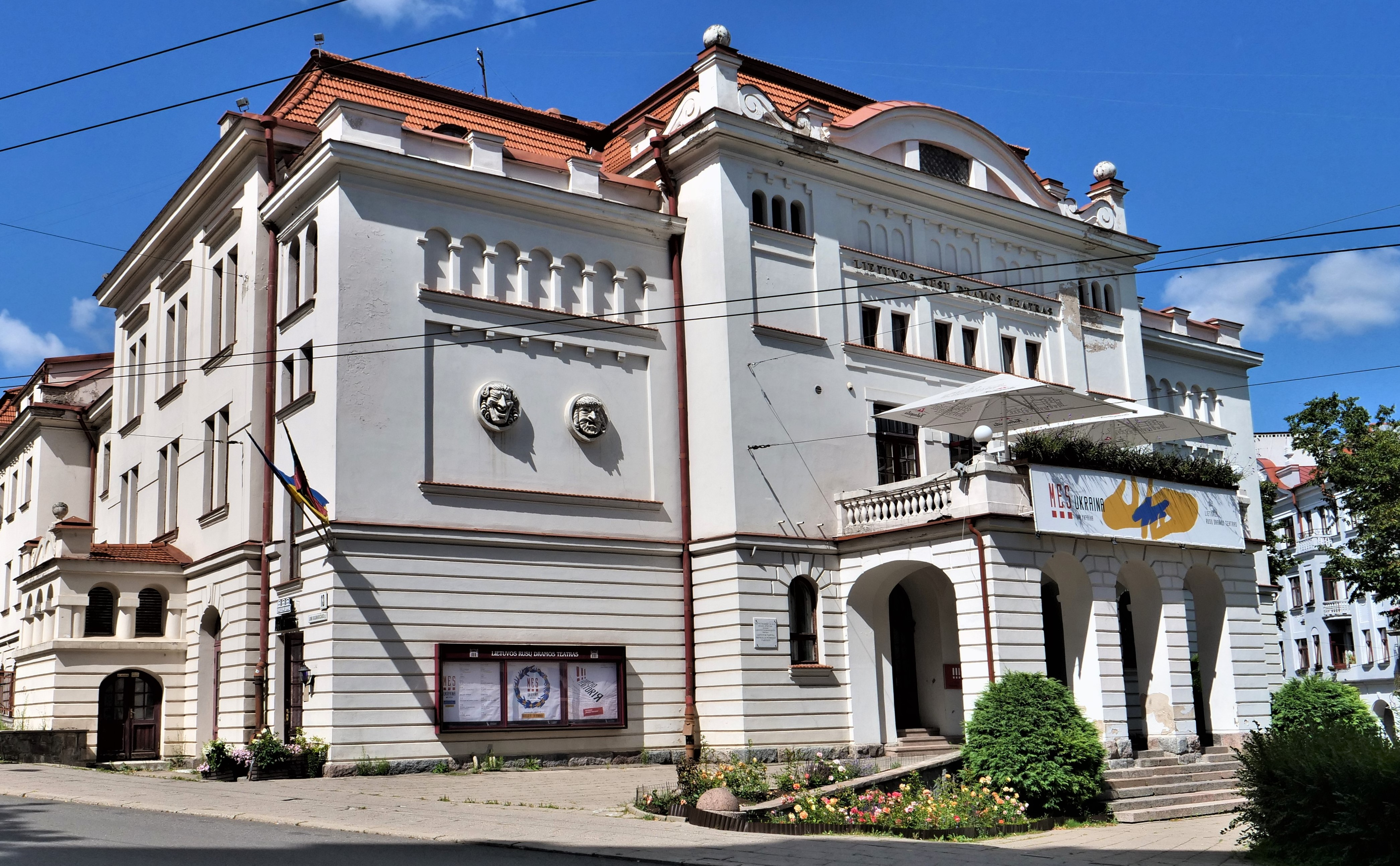
July 2022

Old Theatre of Vilnius (Lithuanian: Vilniaus senasis teatras), built in 1913 as Pohulanka Theatre and formerly known as Russian Drama Theatre of Lithuania (or Lithuanian Russian Dramatic Theatre) and other names, is a theatre in the Old Town of Vilnius. It is the only professional theatre in Lithuania that stages performances in Russian.

The traditions of the Old Theatre in Vilnius date back to the Russian Drama Theatre of 1864 established by Alexandrinsky Theatre actor Pavel Vasilyev. The name of the theatre was changed by a decision of the Lithuanian Ministry of Culture in September 2022 in response to the Russian invasion of Ukraine of that year.

== Building history ==
The building is situated in Vilnius Old Town, which is a UNESCO world heritage site.

=== Polish theatre ===
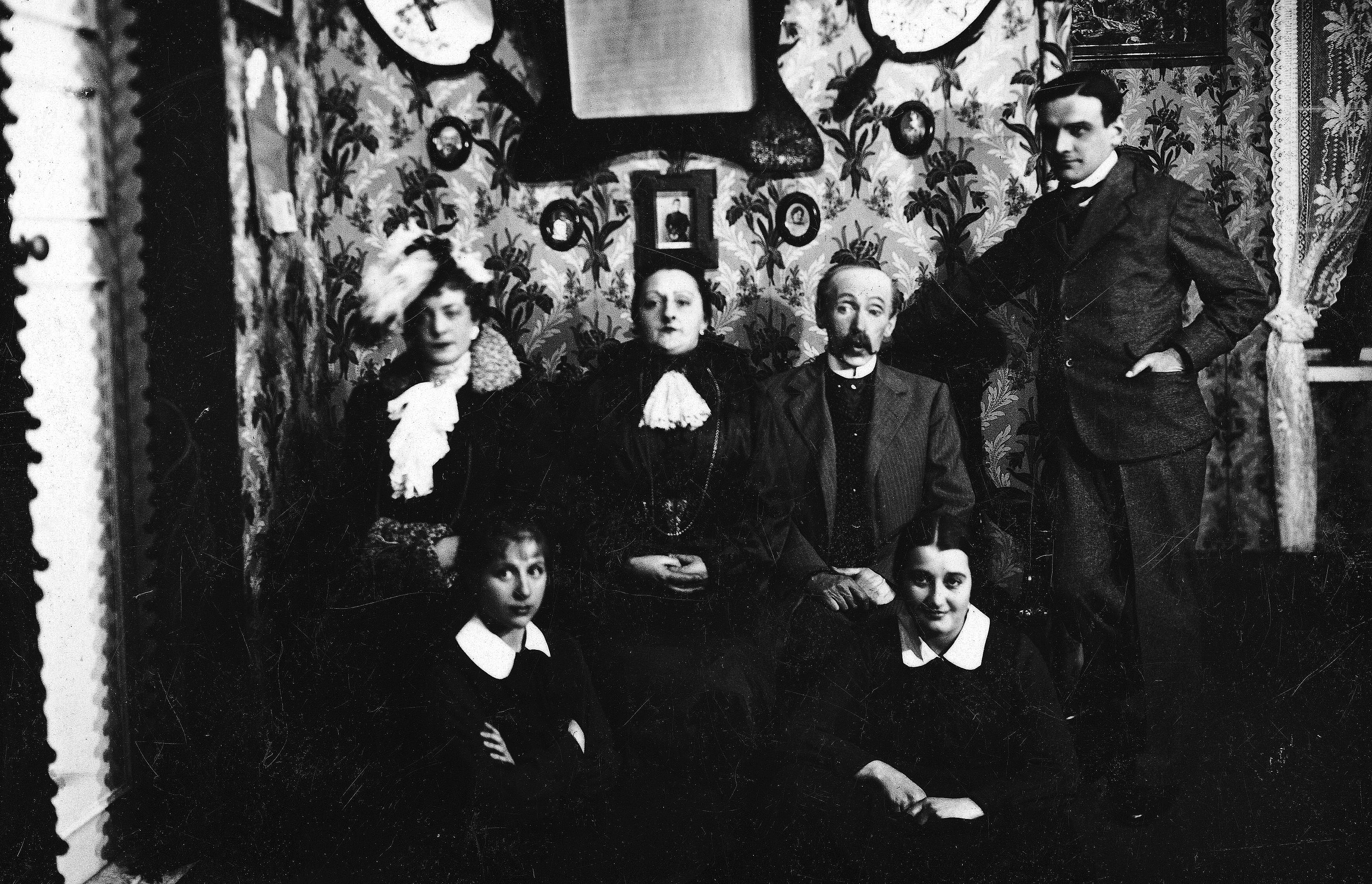
1935 performance of Mrs. Dulska's Morality, by Gabriela Zapolska

The theatre, on the initiative of Hipolit Korwin-Milewski and funded by Polish people living in Vilnius, was designed by Wacław Michniewicz and Aleksander Parczewski as Pohulanka Theatre. It was built in 1913, at a time when Lithuania was part of the Russian Empire), and given to the city administration on the condition that only Polish theatre companies would perform in it. Well-known Polish actors such as Irena Eichlerówna, Nina Andrycz, Henryk Borowski, Hanka Ordonówna, Aleksander Zelwerowicz, Zdzisław Mrożewski, Danuta Szaflarska, Jerzy Duszyński, and Hanka Bielicka, all performed there.

The foundation stone was laid on 17 April 1912, and the theatre opened on 12 October 1913.

On 24 June 1940, the theatre was closed, and after World War II, against the wishes of the Polish benefactors, the building was given to the Lithuanian National Opera and Ballet Theatre. It later housed the Youth Theatre.

In the 21st century, Polish actors once again performed on the stage, and on 4 January 2013, some of the newest Polish plays were presented, to celebrate the centenary of the Pohulanka theatre. The patron of the event was Waldemar Tomaszewski, Polish-Lithuanian Member of the European Parliament, and also the leader of the Electoral Action of Poles in Lithuania. Plays by Ireneusz Iredyński and Inka Dowlasz were presented.

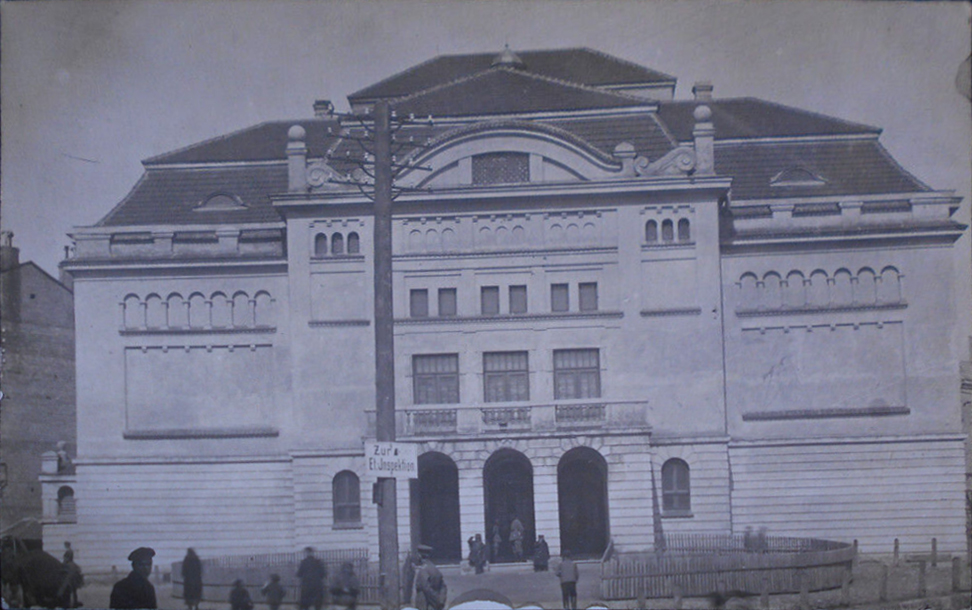
c.1915-18

=== Former names ===
The theatre building has undergone a number of changes of names:

- Polish Drama Theatre (1913–1919)
- Workers' Art Theatre (1919–1920)
- Pohulanka Musical Theatre (1920–1940) (aka Pohulianka, Pogulyanka)
- Russian Drama Theatre of Lithuania
- Reduta Theatre (1925–1929), run by Polish actor and directorJuliusz Ostrewa
- Vilnius National Theatre, or closed? (1940–1944) (Note: See note above, which says it was closed in 1940, and below, it says that the company was disestablished during the First World War (1914-18), and was only re-established in 1946.)
- Lithuanian National Opera and Ballet Theatre (1948–1974)
- Lithuanian SSR Academic Drama Theatre (1974–1981)
- Youth Theatre (1981–1985)

Various refurbishments and renovations to the building have been undertaken over the years, significantly in 1925, 1947 (due to collapsed ceiling), 1974 (reconstruction), 1986, 1998, and 2000, when the roof was replaced. In 1994 it was included in the UNESCO World Heritage List.

Following the 2022 Russian invasion of Ukraine, the theatre was renamed the Old Theatre of Vilnius by a decision of the Lithuanian Ministry of Culture in September 2022.

== Theatre company history ==
The Lithuanian Russian Drama Theatre (Russian: Русский драматический театр, Lithuanian: Lietuvos rusų dramos teatras) was established in 1864 by actor Pavel Vasilyev of the Alexandrinsky Theatre in St Petersburg, Russia. At that time it was the only theatre company in Vilnius, and in the late nineteenth century, Vera Komissarzhevskaya appeared on the stage.

During the First World War (1914–18), the company was disestablished, and was only re-established in 1946, when it premiered Innocent as Charged by A. N. Ostrovsky.

Significant directors at the company have included Roman Viktyuk and Jonas Jurašas, and the actresses Monika Mironaitė and Elina Bystritskaya, and composer and musician Vyacheslav Ganelin performed on stage. The theatre was particularly highly regarded in the 1970s and 1980s.

The company occupied premises in Jogailos Street until 1986, when its current location became the home of the Lithuanian Russian Dramatic Theatre. It is the only professional theatre company in Lithuania that produces performances in Russian.

In 2008 one of the most well-known Lithuanian theatre and film directors, Jonas Vaitkus. was appointed director.

== Present day ==
The Old Theatre is situated in Vilnius Old Town, which is a UNESCO world heritage site. It is the only professional theatre in Lithuania that stages performances in Russian.
