= 1926 LFF Lyga =

LFF Lyga
- Season: 1926
- Champions: Kovas Kaunas

The 1926 LFF Lyga was the 5th season of the LFF Lyga football competition in Lithuania. Kovas Kaunas won the championship.

== Kaunas Group ==
Pos	Team	Pld	W	D	L	GF	GA	GD	Pts
1	Kovas Kaunas	6	4	1	1	24	12	+12	9
2	LFLS Kaunas	6	3	1	2	10	9	+1	7
3	Makabi Kaunas	6	2	1	3	6	14	−8	5
4	KSK Kaunas	6	1	1	4	13	18	−5	3

Source: rsssf.com

== Klaipėda Group ==
=== North Division ===
Pos	Team	Pld	W	D	L	GF	GA	GD	Pts
1	KSS Klaipėda	10	9	0	1	31	17	+14	18
2	Freya Klaipėda	10	7	0	3	21	18	+3	14
3	Spielvereiningung Klaipėda	10	6	1	3	22	16	+6	13
4	MTV Klaipėda	10	4	0	6	15	13	+2	8
5	Vorwarts Šilutė	10	1	3	6	18	36	−18	5
6	VfR Klaipėda	10	0	2	8	5	12	−7	2

Source: rsssf.com

=== South Division ===
Winner: Sportverein Pagėgiai

=== Klaipėda Group Final ===
- KSS Klaipėda 6-1 Sportverein Pagėgiai

== Šiauliai Group ==
Pos	Team	Pld	W	D	L	GF	GA	GD	Pts
1	LFLS Šiauliai	6	5	1	0	19	2	+17	11
2	Žiežirba Šiauliai	6	3	1	2	5	9	−4	7
3	Makabi Šiauliai	6	2	0	4	3	1	+2	4
4	ZAK Šiauliai	6	1	0	5	1	16	−15	2

Source: rsssf.com

== Final ==
- Kovas Kaunas 2-0 LFLS Šiauliai
- Kovas Kaunas 3-2 KSS Klaipėda
