= Polish Theater in Vilnius =

Coordinates: 54°40′14″N 25°15′39″E

The Polish Theater in Vilnius (Polish: Polski Teatr w Wilnie; Lithuanian: Vilniaus lenkų teatras) is a Polish-language theater in Vilnius, Lithuania. It was founded in 1963 by actress and director Irena Rymowicz. It staged its first premiere comedy Ladies and Hussars by Aleksander Fredro in 1965. In 1990, the Polish Theater in Vilnius was awarded a collective Honorary Badge of Merit for Polish Culture from the Polish Ministry of Culture. Since 1992 the artistic director and director of the theater is Irena Litvinovič.

In 1980 the theater received the official status of people's theater and was named the Polish People's Amateur Theater. Since 1990, it is called the Polish Theater in Vilnius (Polski Teatr w Wilnie). Initially the group was based in the Vilnius Palace of Culture of Railwaymen. Between 1993 and 2001 the team worked without its own stage, delivering the performances in the building of the Russian Drama Theater of Lithuania. Since 2001 the theater is located in the House of Polish Culture in Vilnius.

During the more than 50-year period of continuous activity Polish Theater in Vilnius had more than 60 premieres and 3,000 performances, including occasional theatrical scenes and Christmas shows for children. The repertoire consists of dramas, comedies, fairy tales and farce by Polish, Lithuanian and world classical authors. The theater regularly performs in Lithuania and Poland. It is also the regular participant of many amateur theater festivals in Lithuania (Vilniaus rampa, Juoko sūkurys, Atspindžiai) and in Poland (in Kraków, Bielsko-Biała, Rzeszów, Tychy, Głogów, Bełżyce). The theater has toured in Latvia, Belarus, Ukraine, Estonia, the Russian Federation, and Armenia.
