= 1931 LFF Lyga =

LFF Lyga
- Season: 1931
- Champions: KSS Klaipėda
- Matches played: 21
- Goals scored: 91 (4.33 per match)
- Longest unbeaten run: KSS Klaipėda (6 games)
- Longest losing run: Tauras Kaunas (6 games)

The 1931 LFF Lyga was the 10th season of the LFF Lyga football competition in Lithuania. It was contested by 7 teams, and KSS Klaipėda won the championship.

== League standings ==
| Pos | Team | Pld | W | D | L | GF | GA | GD | Pts |
|---|---|---|---|---|---|---|---|---|---|
| 1 | KSS Klaipėda | 6 | 4 | 2 | 0 | 24 | 7 | +17 | 10 |
| 2 | Kovas Kaunas | 6 | 4 | 0 | 2 | 22 | 14 | +8 | 8 |
| 3 | Freya Klaipėda | 6 | 3 | 1 | 2 | 7 | 16 | −9 | 7 |
| 4 | Sveikata Kybartai | 6 | 2 | 2 | 2 | 14 | 14 | 0 | 6 |
| 5 | LGSF Kaunas | 6 | 3 | 0 | 3 | 12 | 12 | 0 | 6 |
| 6 | LFLS Kaunas | 6 | 2 | 1 | 3 | 11 | 10 | +1 | 5 |
| 7 | Tauras Kaunas | 6 | 0 | 0 | 6 | 1 | 18 | −17 | 0 |

Source: rsssf.com
