= 1935 LFF Lyga =

LFF Lyga
- Season: 1935
- Champions: Kovas Kaunas
- Matches played: 64
- Goals scored: 278 (4.34 per match)

The 1935 LFF Lyga was the 14th season of the LFF Lyga football competition in Lithuania. Kovas Kaunas won the championship.

== Kaunas Group ==
Pos	Team	Pld	W	D	L	GF	GA	GD	Pts
1	Kovas Kaunas	10	6	1	3	24	15	+9	13
2	MSK Kaunas	10	5	3	2	21	8	+13	13
3	LFLS Kaunas	10	4	3	3	23	18	+5	11
4	LGSF Kaunas	10	3	4	3	18	24	−6	10
5	Tauras Kaunas	10	2	3	5	10	18	−8	7
6	CJSO Kaunas	10	2	2	6	10	23	−13	6

Source: rsssf.com

=== Kaunas Group Final ===
- Kovas Kaunas 2-1 MSK Kaunas

== Klaipėda Group ==
Pos	Team	Pld	W	D	L	GF	GA	GD	Pts
1	KSS Klaipėda	4	4	0	0	24	1	+23	8
2	Šaulys Klaipėda	4	2	0	2	6	11	−5	4
3	MSK Klaipėda	3	1	0	2	5	13	−8	2
4	KDS Klaipėda	3	0	0	3	1	11	−10	0

Source: rsssf.com

== Šiauliai Group ==
Pos	Team	Pld	W	D	L	GF	GA	GD	Pts
1	Sakalas Šiauliai	5	5	0	0	25	1	+24	10
2	VIII PP Šiauliai	5	3	1	1	18	14	+4	7
3	ŠSK Šiauliai	5	3	1	1	16	13	+3	7
4	Makabi Šiauliai	5	1	1	3	11	18	−7	3
5	LGSF Šiauliai	5	1	1	3	7	18	−11	3
6	JSO Šiauliai	5	0	0	5	3	16	−13	0

Source: rsssf.com

== Panevėžys Group ==
Pos	Team	Pld	W	D	L	GF	GA	GD	Pts
1	Šaulys Panevėzys	2	2	0	0	9	1	+8	4
2	MSK Panevėzys	2	1	0	1	6	4	+2	2
3	JSO Panevėzys	2	0	0	2	1	11	−10	0

Source: rsssf.com

== Sūduva Group ==
- Orija Kalvarija 2-1 Sveikata Kybartai

== Ukmergė Group ==
- Šaulys Ukmergė 4-0 Sparta Ukmergė

== Žemaitija Group ==
- Džiugas Telšiai 3-1 Šaulys Seda

== Eighth final ==
- Sakalas Šiauliai 3-1 Džiugas Telšiai

== Quarterfinal ==
- Šaulys Ukmergė 5-0 Orija Kalvarija
- Sakalas Šiauliai - Šaulys Panevėžys

== Semifinal ==
- Kovas Kaunas 6-2 Šaulys Ukmergė
- KSS Klaipėda 7-0 Sakalas Šiauliai

== Final ==
- Kovas Kaunas 3-2 KSS Klaipėda
