= KSS Klaipėda =

- Full name: Klaipėdos įgulos ir krašto sporto sąjunga
- Founded: 1926
- Dissolved: 1940
- Ground: Klaipėda (1926–1939), Telšiai (1939–1940)
- League: Lithuanian football championship

KSS Klaipėda was a Lithuanian football club from Klaipėda. It was the most accomplished interbellum football club from Klaipėda.

== History ==
The "Klaipėdos įgulos ir krašto sporto sąjunga" (English: Klaipėda Crew and Region Sports Union) was founded in 1926. Until the spring of 1939 the club played in Klaipėda, but after the 1939 German ultimatum to Lithuania it was forced to move to Telšiai, with occasional home matches played in Plungė. It was dissolved in 1940.

=== Name history ===
- 1926 – KSS Klaipėda
- 1939 – KSS Telšiai

=== International games ===
Opponent	Result	Location	Date
(Germany) VfB Königsberg	0:0	Königsberg	1933

== Achievements ==
- Lithuanian Championship
  - Winners (6): 1928, 1929, 1930, 1931, 1936–1937, 1937–1938
  - Runners-up (3): 1926, 1932, 1935
  - Third places (1): 1938–1939
- Champion of Lithuanian National Olympics (1938)
