= Anicet Brodawski =

Lithuanian politician

Anicet Pietrowicz Brodawski (Lithuanian: Anicetas Brodavskis; Аницет Петрович Бродавский; born in 1944) is an activist of the Polish minority in Lithuania, from 1989 to 1991 he was a deputy in the Supreme Soviet of the Soviet Union, and was known one of the promoters of the territorial autonomy of the Vilnius region in 1991.

== Biography ==
Brodawski graduated from the Lithuanian Academy of Agriculture. For 17 years, he was the director of the Vilnius Agronomic-Zoological Technical School. He belonged to the Communist Party of Lithuania and was a member of the Vilnius rayon Soviet of deputies for 7 convocations and also served as its chairman. He also served in the capacity of the acting chairman of the Lithuanian SSR council of the professional secondary education as well as chairman of the council of education of the Vilnius region.

In 1989, Anicet Brodawski was one of the 8 deputies of Polish ethnicity to be elected to the Supreme Soviet of the USSR – along with Jan Ciechanowicz, Bradowski was elected from Lithuania.

In 1991 Brodawski acted as the chairman of the Vilnius rayon Soviet, that was dominated by Communists of Polish ethnicity. Along with Czesław Wysocki, who chaired the regional Soviet of Šalčininkai rayon, he sought to establish a Polish autonomy in the Vilnius region.

After Lithuania regained independence, Anicet Brodawski was a member of the Związek Polaków na Litwie. In 1994, he participated in the foundation of the Akcja Wyborcza Polaków na Litwie; he supports co-operation with the Lithuanian left, e.g. the party of Kazimiera Prunskienė.

Brodawski is currently the chairman of the Agency of Agricultural Development.
