= 1937 LFF Lyga =

LFF Lyga
- Season: 1937
- Champions: KSS Klaipėda
- Matches played: 72
- Goals scored: 226 (3.14 per match)

The 1937 LFF Lyga was the 16th season of the LFF Lyga football competition in Lithuania. It was contested by 9 teams, and KSS Klaipėda won the championship.

== League standings ==
Pos	Team	Pld	W	D	L	GF	GA	GD	Pts
1	KSS Klaipėda	16	13	2	1	61	17	+44	28
2	Kovas Kaunas	16	8	5	3	33	19	+14	21
3	LFLS Kaunas	16	8	5	3	28	15	+13	21
4	MSK Kaunas	16	8	4	4	17	12	+5	20
5	CJSO Kaunas	16	6	6	4	16	17	−1	18
6	LGSF Kaunas	16	6	1	9	23	24	−1	13
7	Švyturys Klaipėda	16	4	2	10	18	30	−12	10
8	Tauras Kaunas	16	3	2	11	20	37	−17	8
9	Šaulys Marijampolė	16	0	5	11	10	55	−45	5

Source: rsssf.com
