= Poles in Lithuania =

Ethnic group in Lithuania

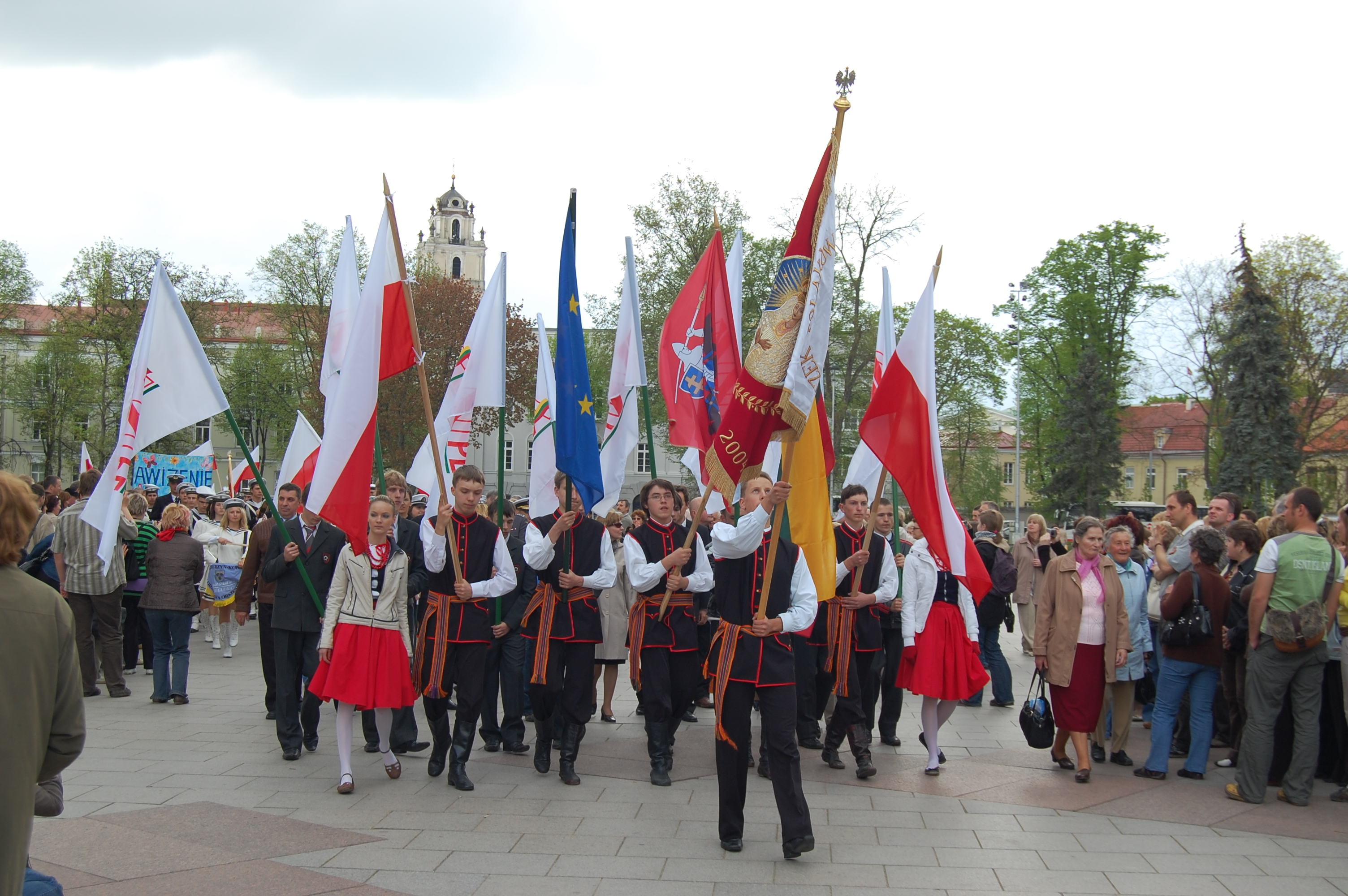
- Polish minority marching in Vilnius (2008)

Total population
- 183,000 (2021 census)

Regions with significant populations
- Vilnius County

Languages
- Polish (incl. Northern Borderlands dialect); Belarusian dialects (primarily Simple speech); Russian; Lithuanian

Religion
- Predominantly Roman Catholic (Note: Research indicates that religion serves as a primary boundary marker between Poles and Belarusians in the region. While linguistically the groups may be close due to the usage of similar dialects, the local population strictly categorizes Catholics as Poles and Orthodox believers as Belarusians (or Russians))

Related ethnic groups
- Belarusians, Lithuanians, Poles

The Poles in Lithuania (Polish: Polacy na Litwie, Lithuanian: Lietuvos lenkai), also called Lithuanian Poles, estimated at 183,000 people in the 2021 Lithuanian census or 6.5% of Lithuania's total population, are the country's largest ethnic minority.

The first Polish people in Lithuania were mainly enslaved war captives from the Polish–Lithuanian Wars (13th–14th centuries). During the subsequent Polish–Lithuanian union until the Commonwealth's end in 1795, there was a gradual Polonization of Lithuania's upper classes, namely the nobility, which still maintained a Lithuanian identity. In addition, there was an influx of Poles into the country. Polish migration to Lithuania continued despite the Third Lithuanian Statute's attempt to prohibit Polish settlement.

During the 19th century, Polonization of Lithuanian and Belarusian peasants led to a large Polish-speaking population stretching to Daugavpils and including Vilnius by the 1890s. The rise of Polish nationalism and the Lithuanian National Revival led to irreconcilable differences between Poles and Lithuanians, that, following World War I and the rebirth of both states, escalated into the Polish–Lithuanian War, centred on Vilnius and its region. Thereafter, most, but not all, Poles living in the Lithuanian lands found themselves within the Polish borders. During World War II, the Polish population was persecuted by the USSR and Nazi Germany. Post-World War II, the borders were changed and the disputes were suppressed as the Soviet Union exercised power over both countries and a significant part of the Poles, especially the best-educated, resettled from the Lithuanian SSR to the Polish People's Republic. At the same time, many Poles relocated from nearby areas within the Byelorussian SSR to Vilnius and Vilnius region. After Lithuania regained independence, Lithuania–Poland relations were tense in the 1990s due to alleged discrimination of the Polish minority in Lithuania.

Currently, the Polish population is grouped in the Vilnius region, primarily the Vilnius and Šalčininkai districts. In the city of Vilnius alone there are more than 85,000 Poles, who make up about 15% of the Lithuanian capital's population. Most Poles in Lithuania are Roman Catholic and speak Polish, although a minority of them speak Russian or Lithuanian as their first language.

== Statistics ==
According to the 2021 Lithuanian census, the Polish minority in Lithuania numbered 183,421 persons or 6.5% of the population of Lithuania. It is the largest ethnic minority in Lithuania, the second largest being the Russian minority. Poles are concentrated in the Vilnius Region. Most Poles live in Vilnius County (170,919 people, or 21% of the county's population); Vilnius, the capital of Lithuania, has 85,438 Poles, or 15.4% of the city's population. Especially large Polish communities are found in the district municipalities of Vilnius (46% of the population) and Šalčininkai (76%).

Historical population
| Year | Pop. | ±% |
|---|---|---|
| 1825 | 100,000 (Note: This is the estimate provided for people who were called "Poles, Nobility and Townspeople" in the Vilna Governorate (Polish: Gubernia wileńska in the source), which in 1825 included most of modern Lithuania, except the lands now in Suwałki Governorate) | — |
| 1897 | 260,000 | +160.0% |
| 1942 | 356,000 | +36.9% |
| 1944 | 380,000 | +6.7% |
| 1947 | 208,000 | −45.3% |
| 1959 | 230,000 | +10.6% |
| 1970 | 240,000 | +4.3% |
| 1979 | 247,000 | +2.9% |
| 1989 | 258,000 | +4.5% |
| 2001 | 235,000 | −8.9% |
| 2011 | 200,000 | −14.9% |
| 2021 | 183,000 | −8.5% |

Lithuanian municipalities with a Polish minority exceeding 15% of the total population (according to the 2021 census) are listed in the table below:

Poles in Lithuania according to the 2021 Lithuanian census
| Municipality name | Area | Total population | Number of Poles | Percentage |
|---|---|---|---|---|
| Vilnius city | 401 km^{2} | 556,490 | 85,438 | 15.4% |
| Vilnius district | 2,129 km^{2} | 96,295 | 45,020 | 46.8% |
| Šalčininkai district | 1,491 km^{2} | 30,052 | 22,934 | 76.3% |
| Trakai district | 1,208 km^{2} | 32,042 | 8,823 | 27.5% |
| Švenčionys district | 1,692 km^{2} | 22,966 | 5,585 | 24.3% |

Top 10 cities by number of Poles:

- Vilnius: 85,438
- Šalčininkai: 4,930
- Lentvaris: 2,859
- Nemenčinė: 2,858
- Eišiškės: 2,844
- Pabradė: 2,681
- Grigiškės: 2,518
- Visaginas: 2,084
- Trakai: 938
- Švenčionys: 860

=== Languages ===
The adoption of Polish cultural features by the nobles, townspeople, and clergy in the Grand Duchy of Lithuania, combined with an influx of migrants from Poland, created a Lithuanian variant of the Polish language. The local variety of Polish called Polszczyzna Litewska became the native tongue of the Lithuanian nobility in the 18th century.

According to Polish professor Jan Otrębski's article published in 1931, the Polish dialect in the Vilnius Region and in the northeastern areas in general are very interesting variant of Polishness as this dialect developed in a foreign territory which was mostly inhabited by the Lithuanians who were Belarusized (mostly) or Polonized, and to prove this Otrębski provided examples of Lithuanianisms in the Tutejszy language. In 2015, Polish linguist Mirosław Jankowiak attested that many of the Vilnius Region's inhabitants who declare Polish nationality speak a Belarusian dialect which they call mowa prosta ('simple speech').

Out of the 234,989 Poles in Lithuania, 187,918 (80.0%) consider Polish to be their first language. 22,439 Poles (9.5%) speak Russian as their first language, while 17,233 (7.3%) speak Lithuanian. 6,279 Poles (2.7%) did not indicate their first language. The remaining 0.5% speak various other languages. The Polish regiolect spoken by Lithuanian Poles is classified under Northern Borderlands dialect. Most of Poles who live southwards of Vilnius speak a form of Belarusian vernacular called there "simple speech", that contains many substratical relics from Lithuanian and Polish.

According to ethnologist Yury Vnukovich, the linguistic situation in the Vilnius Region presents a unique "ethnic anomaly": while the Lithuanians are identified by the local population primarily by their language, for the local Slavic-speakers, their everyday language ("prostaya mova") is not a marker of ethnicity. Residents who speak this Belarusian vernacular identify as Poles based on other factors, primarily their Catholic faith (locally perceived as the "Polish faith") and their origin from the Vilnius region.

Vnukovich notes that the "simple speech" is often stigmatized by its speakers as "uneducated" or "mixed". In contrast, the standard Polish language holds a high prestige and symbolic value. Even if local residents do not speak standard Polish fluently in daily life, they often demonstrate their Polish identity by reciting prayers, songs, or greetings in Polish.

== Education ==
Absolute numbers with Polish language education at Lithuanian rural schools (1980)
| Municipality | Lithuanian | Russian | Polish |
|---|---|---|---|
| Vilnius district | 1,250 | 4,150 | 6,400 |
| Šalčininkai | 500 | 2,050 | 3,200 |
| Trakai | 2,900 | 50 | 950 |
| Širvintos | 2,400 | 100 | 100 |
| Švenčionys | 1,350 | 600 | 100 |
| Varėna | 6,000 | 0 | 50 |
Absolute number with Polish language education at Lithuanian urban schools was 5,600

As of 1980, about 20% of Polish Lithuanian students chose Polish as the language of instruction at school. In the same year, about 60–70% of rural Polish communities chose Polish. However, even in towns with a predominantly Polish population, the share of Polish-language education was less than the percentage of Poles. Even though, historically, Poles tended to strongly oppose Russification, one of the most important reasons to choose Russian language education was the absence of a Polish-language college and university learning in the USSR, and during Soviet times Polish students in Lithuania were not allowed to get college/university education across the border in Poland. Only in 2007, the first small branch of the Polish University of Białystok opened in Vilnius. In 1980 there were 16,400 school students instructed in Polish. Their number declined to 11,400 in 1990. In independent Lithuania between 1990 and 2001, the number of Polish mother tongue children attending schools with Polish as the language of instruction doubled to over 22,300, then gradually decreased to 18,392 in 2005. In September 2003, there were 75 Polish-language general education schools and 52 which provided education in Polish in a combination of languages (for example Lithuanian-Polish, Lithuanian-Russian-Polish). These numbers fell to 49 and 41 in 2011, reflecting a general decline in the number of schools in Lithuania. Polish government was concerned in 2015 about the education in Polish.

== History until 1990 ==
=== Grand Duchy of Lithuania (before 1795) ===
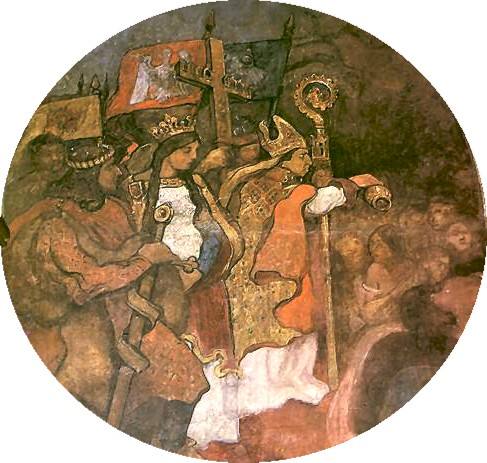
Andrzej Jastrzębiec was the first Bishop of Vilnius. He is depicted in the fresco "Baptism of Lithuania" by Włodzimierz Tetmajer

The first Polish people in Lithuania were mainly enslaved war captives from the Polish–Lithuanian wars. Poles started to migrate to the Grand Duchy in more noticeable numbers after Christianization of the country and establishment of the union between Poland and Lithuania in 1385. In the 15th-16th centuries, there were not many Poles in Lithuania, but they enjoyed a privileged social status – they were found in highly regarded places and their culture was considered prestigious. With time Polish people became part of the local landowning class. Lithuanian nobles welcomed fugitive Polish peasants and settled them on uncultivated land, but they usually assimilated with Belarusians and Lithuanians peasants within few generations. In the 16th century, the largest concentrations of Poles in Lithuania were located in Podlachia, (Note: Podlachia was part of the Grand Duchy of Lithuania between the late 13th century and 1569. The region was a sphere of old Polish-Mazovian settlement and was governed according to the Polish law since 1514. In the mid-16th century, the Poles became the main group among the Podlachian gentry, which led to demands from the local deputies for the complete union of their lands with Poland. With time, Mazovians also started to predominate in Podlachian towns. The total number of Poles in the Grand Duchy of Lithuania decreased with the loss of Podlachia and lands in Ukraine.) the border areas of Samogitia, Lithuania and Belarus, and the cities of Vilnius, Brest, Kaunas, Grodno, Kėdainiai, and Nyasvizh. During that period, the royal and grand ducal courts were nearly entirely composed of Polish speakers. Polish quickly supplanted Ruthenian as the language of Lithuanian elite after the latter had switched to speaking Ruthenian and Polish at the beginning of the 16th century. Reformation gave another impetus to the spread of Polish, as the Bible and other religious texts were translated from Latin to Polish. Since the second half of the 16th century, Poles predominated in Protestant schools and printing houses in Lithuania, and the life of local protestant congregations. There were also numerous Poles among the Jesuits residing in Lithuania.

The influx of Poles to Lithuania significantly increased after the Union of Lublin. This population movement created a fertile ground for socio-cultural Polonization of ethnically Lithuanian territories. While Poles and foreigners were generally prohibited from holding public offices in the Grand Duchy, Polish people gradually gained this right through the acquisition of Lithuanian land. Poor nobles from the Crown rented land from local magnates. The number of Poles grew also in the towns, among others in Vilnius, Kaunas, and Grodno. Vilnius became the most important center of the Polish intelligentsia in the Grand Duchy, with Poles predominating in the city in the mid-17th century.

Already in the 16th century Polish became the first language of the Lithuanian magnates. In the following centuries it was adopted by the Lithuanian nobility in general. Even the Samogitian nobility used the Polish language already in the 17th century. The Polish language also penetrated other social strata: the clergy, the townspeople, and even the peasants. During the Commonwealth, a Polish-dominated territory started to be slowly formed in the Grand Duchy of Lithuania. The Polish historian Władysław Wielhorski estimated that by the end of the 18th century, Polish and Polonized people constituted 25% of the Grand Duchy's inhabitants.

=== Lithuania under Russian rule (1795–1918) ===
Until the 1830s, Polish was the administrative language in the so called Western Krai, which included the territories of the Grand Duchy of Lithuania that were annexed by the Russian Empire. During the 19th century, Poles were the most numerous group among Vilnius' Christian inhabitants, and they also predominated in the municipal governing body in the early half of that century. The Polish-language university was re-established in Vilnius in 1803 and closed in 1832. After the 1863 uprising, public use of the Polish language and teaching it to peasants, as well as possession of Polish books by the latter became illegal. Notwithstanding their varied ethnic roots, the members of szlachta generally opted for Polish self-identification in the course of the 19th century.

In the 19th century, Polish culture spread among the lower classes of Lithuania, mainly in Dzūkija and to a lesser degree in Aukštaitija. Linguists distinguish between official Polish language, used in the Church and cultural activities, and colloquial language, closer to the speech of the common people. Inhabitants of a significant part of the Vilnius region used a variant of the Belarusian language, which was influenced mainly by Polish, referred to as "simple speech" (Polish: mowa prosta). It was a kind of "mixed language" serving as an interdialect of the cultural borderland. This language became a gateway to the progressive Slavization of the Lithuanian population. This led to the formation of a compact Polish language area between the Lithuanian and Belarusian language areas, with Vilnius as the center. The position of Vilnius as an important Polish cultural center influenced the development of national identities among Roman Catholic peasants in the region. The Lithuanian National Revival began in the 19th century as a self-defence reaction to the Polonization and by the 1880s started slowing down the process of Polonization of the ethnically Lithuanian population, but also cemented a sense of national identity among a significant portion of the Polish-speaking Lithuanian population. The feeling of a two-tier Lithuanian-Polish national identity, present throughout the period, had to give way to a clear national declaration.

=== Interwar period and Second World War (1918–1944) ===
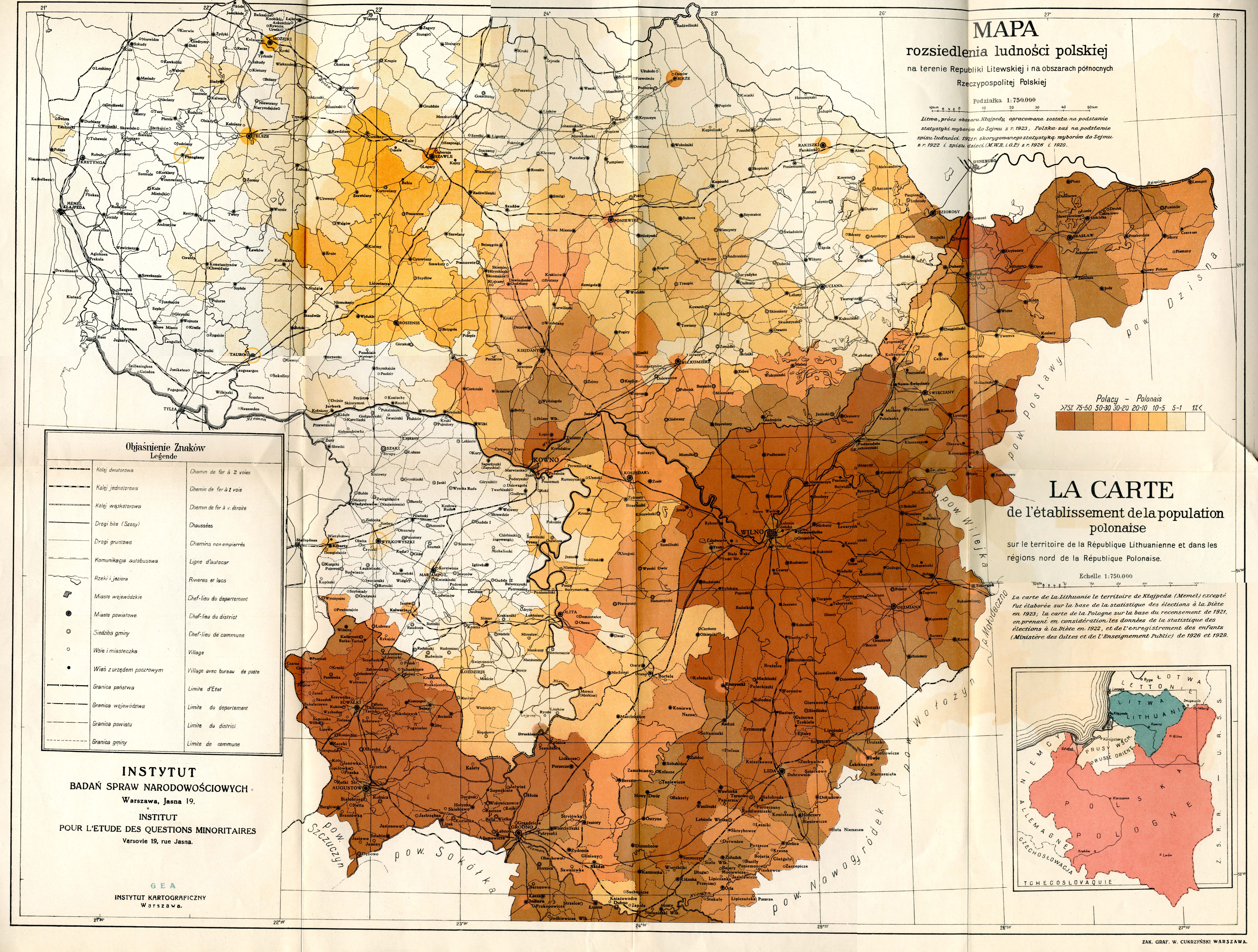
Polish Interwar map of Polish minority in Lithuania (in brown) in 1923, interpolation, based on the election results in Lithuania

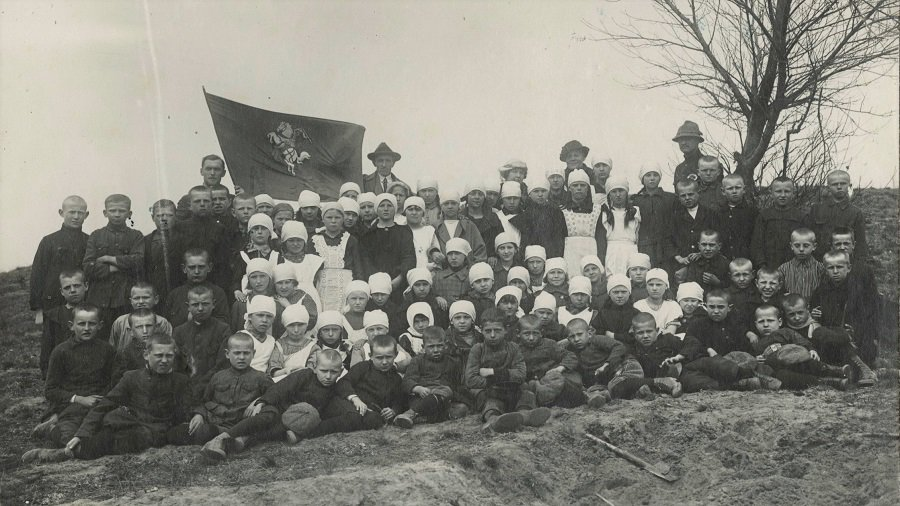
Poles in the interwar Lithuanian state, between 1923–1924

From 1918 to 1921 there were several conflicts, such as the activity of the Polish Military Organisation, Sejny uprising and a foiled attempt at a Polish coup of the Lithuanian government. The Polish–Lithuanian War and Żeligowski's mutiny led to such borders between Lithuania and Poland which resulted in many Poles living in the Lithuanian state and numerous Lithuanians outside of it. The loss of Vilnius was a painful blow to Lithuanian aspirations and identity, as most of the Vilnius region was part of the Second Polish Republic during the interwar period. The irredentist demand for its recovery became one of the most important elements of socio-political life in interwar Lithuania and resulted in the emergence of hostility and resentment against the Poles.

In interwar Lithuania, people declaring Polish ethnicity were officially described as Polonized Lithuanians who needed to be re-Lithuanized, Polish-owned land was confiscated, Polish religious services, schools, publications and voting rights were restricted. According to the 1923 Lithuanian census (without Vilnius and Klaipėda regions), there were 65,600 Poles in Lithuania (3.2% of the total population). However, according to Polish Election Committee the number of Poles was actually 202,026, so about 10% of total population. The Poles were concentrated in the districts of Kaunas, Kėdainiai, Kaišiadorys and Ukmergė, in each of which they constituted 20–30% of the population. In 1919, Poles owned 90% of estates larger than 100 ha. By 1928, 2,997 large estates with a total area of 555,207 ha were parceled out, and 52,935 new farms were created in their place and given to Lithuanian peasants.

Polish schools in the interwar Lithuania
| Number of | 1925/1926 | 1926/1927 | 1927/1928 | 1928/1929 |
|---|---|---|---|---|
| Polish elementary schools | 7 | 75 | 20 | 14 |
| Employed Polish teachers | 10 | 90 | 22 | 17 |
| Pupils | 365 | 4 089 | 554 | 450 |

Many Poles in Lithuania were signed in as Lithuanians in their passports, and as a result, they also were forced to attend Lithuanian schools. Polish education was organized by the Pochodnia. After the establishment of Valdemaras regime in 1926, 58 Polish schools were closed, many Poles were incarcerated, and Polish newspapers were placed under strict censorship. Poles also had difficult access to higher education. Over time, the Polish language was also removed from the Church and seminaries. The most tragic episode in the history of Poles in interwar Lithuania was an anti-Polish demonstration organized by the Lithuanian Riflemen's Union on May 23, 1930 in Kaunas, which turned into a riot.

=== Soviet period (1944–1990) ===
Polish population in 1959 (≥ 20%)
| Raion | % |
|---|---|
| City of Vilnius | 20.00% |
| Vilnius | 81.44% |
| Šalčininkai | 83.87% |
| Nemenčinė | 73.21% |
| Eišiškės | 67.40% |
| Trakai | 48.17% |
| Švenčionys | 23.86% |
| Vievis | 22.87% |

During the World War II expulsions and shortly after the war, the Soviet Union, forcibly exchanged population between Poland and Lithuania. During 1945–1948, the Soviet Union allowed 197,000 Poles to leave to Poland; in 1956–1959, another 46,600 were able to leave. Ethnic Poles made up 80-91% of Vilnius population in 1944. All Poles in the city were required to register for resettlement. In most cases, the Soviet authorities blocked the departure of Poles who were interwar Lithuanian citizens and only 8.3% (less than 8,000) of those who registered for repatriation in Kaunas Region in 1945–1946 managed to leave for Poland.

In the 1950s the remaining Polish minority was a target of several attempted campaigns of Lithuanization by the Communist Party of Lithuania, which tried to stop any teaching in Polish; those attempts, however, were stopped by Moscow. The Soviet census of 1959 showed 230,100 Poles concentrated in the Vilnius region (8.5% of the Lithuanian SSR's population). The Polish minority increased in size, but more slowly than other ethnic groups in Lithuania; the last Soviet census of 1989 showed 258,000 Poles (7.0% of the Lithuanian SSR's population). The Polish minority, subject in the past to massive, often voluntary Russification and Sovietization, and recently to voluntary processes of Lithuanization, shows many and increasing signs of assimilation with Lithuanians.

== In independent Lithuania ==
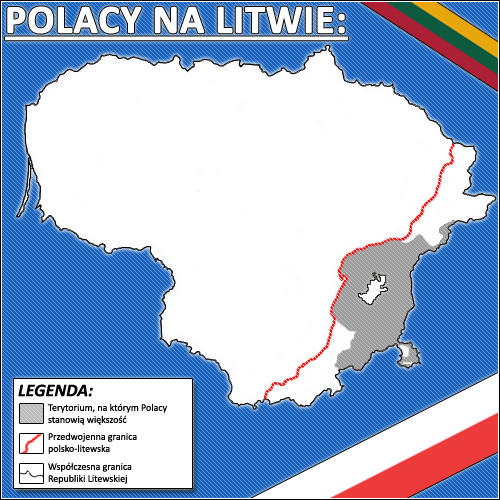
Grey: Areas with majority Polish population in Lithuania as of early 2000s. Red: 1920–1939 Polish–Lithuanian border

=== 1990–2000 ===
When Lithuania declared its independence from the Soviet Union in 1990 large part of the Polish minority, still remembering the 1950s attempts to ban Polish, was afraid that the independent Lithuanian government might want to reintroduce the Lithuanization policies. Furthermore, some Lithuanian nationalists, notably the Vilnija organization which was founded in 1988, considered eastern Lithuania's inhabitants as Polonized Lithuanians. Due to their view of ethnicity as primordial, they argued that the Lithuanian state should work to restore their "true" identity. Although, many Poles in Lithuania do have Lithuanian ancestry, they considered themselves ethnically Polish.

According to the historian Alfred E. Senn, the Polish minority was divided into three main groups: Vilnius' inhabitants supported Lithuanian independence, the residents of Vilnius' southeastern districts and Šalčininkai were pro-Soviet, while the third group scattered throughout the country did not have a clear position. According to surveys from the spring of 1990, 47% of Poles in Lithuania supported the pro-Soviet Communist party (in contrast to 8% support among ethnic Lithuanians), while 35% supported Lithuanian independence.

In November 1988, Yedinstvo (literally "Unity"), a pro-Soviet movement that opposed Lithuanian independence, was formed. Under local Polish leadership and with Soviet support, the regional authorities in Vilnius and Šalčininkai region declared an autonomous region, the Polish National Territorial Region. The same Polish politicians later voiced support for the Soviet coup attempt of 1991 in Moscow. Yedinstvo, which had never had the approval of the Polish government, collapsed after the failure of the GKChP in the 1991 Soviet coup d'état attempt, which doomed any prospect of a return to Soviet rule. Simultaneously, after the August Coup's failure, the Polish autonomous region was immediately declared illegal by the Lithuanian government, which instituted direct rule in those areas.

In April 1989, another more moderate organization of Lithuanian Poles, the Association of Poles in Lithuania (Polish: Związek Polaków na Litwie, ZPL), was established. Its first leader was Jan Sienkiewicz. ZPL supported the 1991 Lithuanian independence referendum. On 29 January 1991, Lithuanian government granted minorities right of schooling in their native language and use of it in official institutions.

A new Citizenship Law was enacted in December 1991, that granted citizenship to every person that lived in eastern Lithuania before 1940, if they did not have citizenship of another country, thus excluding some persons that emigrated to Lithuania after the war.

Such a situation caused tension in Polish–Lithuanian relations. Direct rule was lifted and local elections were organised in December 1992. The ZPL also strengthened its attitude, demanding that the Polish minority be granted a number of rights, such as the establishment of a Polish university, increasing the rights of the Polish language, increasing subsidies from the central budget, and others. ZPL took part in the 1992 parliamentary elections winning 2.07% of the votes and four seats in Seimas.

In 1994, Lithuanian parliament limited participation in local elections to political parties, accordingly ZPL established Electoral Action for Lithuanian Poles (Polish: Akcja Wyborcza Polaków na Litwie, AWPL). In January 1995 a new Language Law was enacted which required representatives of local institutions to know Lithuanian language, also all secondary schools were required to teach Lithuanian.

Polish–Lithuanian relations eased only in 1994, when both countries signed a treaty of good neighborhood. The treaty protected the rights of the Polish minority in Lithuania and the Lithuanian minority in Poland. It also defined nationality as a matter of individual choice, which was contrary to the definition popular among Lithuanian nationalists, and even to the definition given in Lithuania's National Minorities Right Law of 1989, which defined nationality as something inherited. The Treaty defined that to the Polish ethnic minority belongs to persons who have Lithuanian citizenship, are of Polish origin or consider themselves to belong to the Polish nationality, culture and traditions as well as viewing the Polish language as their native language.

The situation of the Polish minority assumed international significance again in 1995 after the publication of a Council of Europe report prepared by a commission headed by György Frunda (the so-called "Frunda Report"), which criticized Lithuanian policy toward the Polish minority, particularly the lack of recognition of the Polish university. However, this did not significantly affect Lithuanian politics. In 1996, the special provisions that made an entry of ethno-political parties parliament easier were removed, and from then on they had to meet the usual electoral threshold. The restoration of property lost during the communist period was also a burning issue, which was implemented very slowly in the lands inhabited by Poles. Poles protested against the expansion of Vilnius' borders.

=== After 2000 ===
Tensions arose regarding Polish education and the spelling of names. The United States Department of State stated, in a report issued in 2001, that the Polish minority had issued complaints concerning its status in Lithuania, and that members of the Polish Parliament criticized the government of Lithuania over alleged discrimination against the Polish minority. In 2006 Polish Foreign Minister Stefan Meller asserted that Polish educational institutions in Lithuania are severely underfunded. Similar concerns were voiced in 2007 by a Polish parliamentary commission. According to a report issued by the European Union Fundamental Rights Agency in 2004, Poles in Lithuania were the second least-educated minority group in Lithuania. The branch of the University of Białystok in Vilnius educates mostly members of the Polish minority.

A report by the Council of Europe, issued in 2007, stated that on the whole, minorities were integrated quite well into the everyday life of Lithuania. The report expressed a concern with Lithuanian nationality law, which contains a right of return clause. The citizenship law was under discussion during 2007; it was deemed unconstitutional on 13 November 2006. A proposed constitutional amendment would allow the Polish minority in Lithuania to apply for Polish passports.

Lithuanian constitutional law stipulated that everyone (not only Poles) who has Lithuanian citizenship and resides within the country has to write their name in the Lithuanian alphabet and according to the Lithuanian pronunciation; for example, the name Kleczkowski has to be spelled Klečkovski in official documents. Poles who registered for Lithuanian citizenship after dissolution of the Soviet Union were forced to accept official documents with Lithuanian versions of their names. On April 24, 2012 the European Parliament accepted for further consideration the petition (number 0358/2011) submitted by a Tomasz Snarski about the language rights of Polish minority, in particular about enforced Lithuanization of Polish surnames.

Representatives of the Lithuanian government demanded removal of illegally placed Polish names of the streets in Maišiagala, Raudondvaris, Riešė and Sudervė as by a Lithuanian law, all the street name signs must be in a state language. as by constitutional law all names have to be in Lithuanian. Tensions have been reported between the Lithuanian Roman Catholic clergy and its Polish parishioniers in Lithuania. The Seimas voted against foreign surnames in Lithuanian passports.

In late May 2008, the Association of Poles in Lithuania issued a letter, addressed to Lithuania's government, complaining about anti-minority (primarily, anti-Polish) rhetoric in media, citing upcoming parliamentary elections as a motive, and asking for better treatment of the ethnic minorities. The association also filed a complaint with the Lithuanian prosecutor, asking for investigation of the issue.

The Law on Ethnic Minorities lapsed in 2010. As of 2023 Lithuania has not ratified the European Charter for Regional or Minority Languages.

== Political issues ==
=== Alleged discrimination ===
There are opinions in some Polish media that the Polish minority in Lithuania is facing discrimination. As mentioned above, Petition 0358/2011 on language rights of Poles living in Lithuania was filed with the European Parliament in 2011. Polish Election Action in Lithuania claimed that the education legislation is discriminatory. In 2011, former Polish President Lech Wałęsa criticized the government of Lithuania over its alleged discrimination against the Polish minority.

Until 2022 Lithuania continued to enforce the Lithuanized spelling of surnames of Poles in Lithuania, with some exceptions, in spite of the 1994 Polish–Lithuanian agreement, Lithuanian legislative system and the Constitution, see section "Surnames" for details.

Until 2010, Lithuanian-Polish bilingual street signs were considered legal in Lithuania if placed in the areas with significant Polish populations. However, the Law on National Minorities, which guaranteed this, was discontinued. As a result, such signs are now prohibited and Lithuanian courts enforce their removal under the threat of fines. The refusal of Lithuanian authorities to install or allow bilingual road signs (against the legislative base of Lithuania) in areas densely populated by Lithuanian Poles is at times described by the Electoral Action of Poles in Lithuania and some Polish media as linguistic discrimination.

=== Name/surname spelling ===
The official spelling of the all non-Lithuanian (hence Polish) name in a person's passport is governed by the 31 January 1991 Resolution of the Supreme Council of Lithuania No. I-1031 "Concerning name and surname spelling in the passport of the citizen of the Republic of Lithuania". There are the following options. The law says, in part:

2. In the passport of a citizen of the Republic of Lithuania, the first name and surname of persons of non-Lithuanian origin shall be spelt in Lithuanian. On the citizen's request in writing, the name and surname can be spelt in the order established as follows:

a) according to pronunciation and without grammatisation (i.e. without Lithuanian endings) or

b) according to pronunciation alongside grammatisation (i.e. adding Lithuanian endings).

3. The names and surnames of the persons, who have already possessed citizenship of other State, shall be written according to the passport of the State or an equivalent document available in the passport of the Republic of Lithuania on its issue.

This resolution was challenged in 1999 in the Constitutional Court upon a civil case of a person of Polish ethnicity who requested his name to be entered in the passport in Polish. The Constitutional Court upheld the 1991 resolution. At the same time, it was stressed out citizen's rights to spell their name whatever they like in areas "not linked with the sphere of use of the state language pointed out in the law".

In 2022, the Seimas passed a law allowing members of ethnic minorities to use the full Latin alphabet, including q, w and x, letters which are not considered part of the Lithuanian alphabet, but not characters with diacritics (such as ł and ä), in their legal name if they declare their status as an ethnic minority and prove that their ancestors used that name. In response, several ethnically Polish Lithuanian politicians changed their legal names to be closer to the Polish spelling, most notably Justice Minister Ewelina Dobrowolska (formerly spelled "Evelina Dobrovolska"), but requests for name changes from the general population were low. From May 2022 when law came into action until the end of July 2023 only 337 people changed their names to include non-Lithuanian language symbols and only less than 5 of those declared to be of Polish descent. By the end of August 2023 the number of people of Polish descent that changed their names to include non-Lithuanian symbols increased to 203 which was approximately 0.11% of all Poles in Lithuania.

== Organizations ==
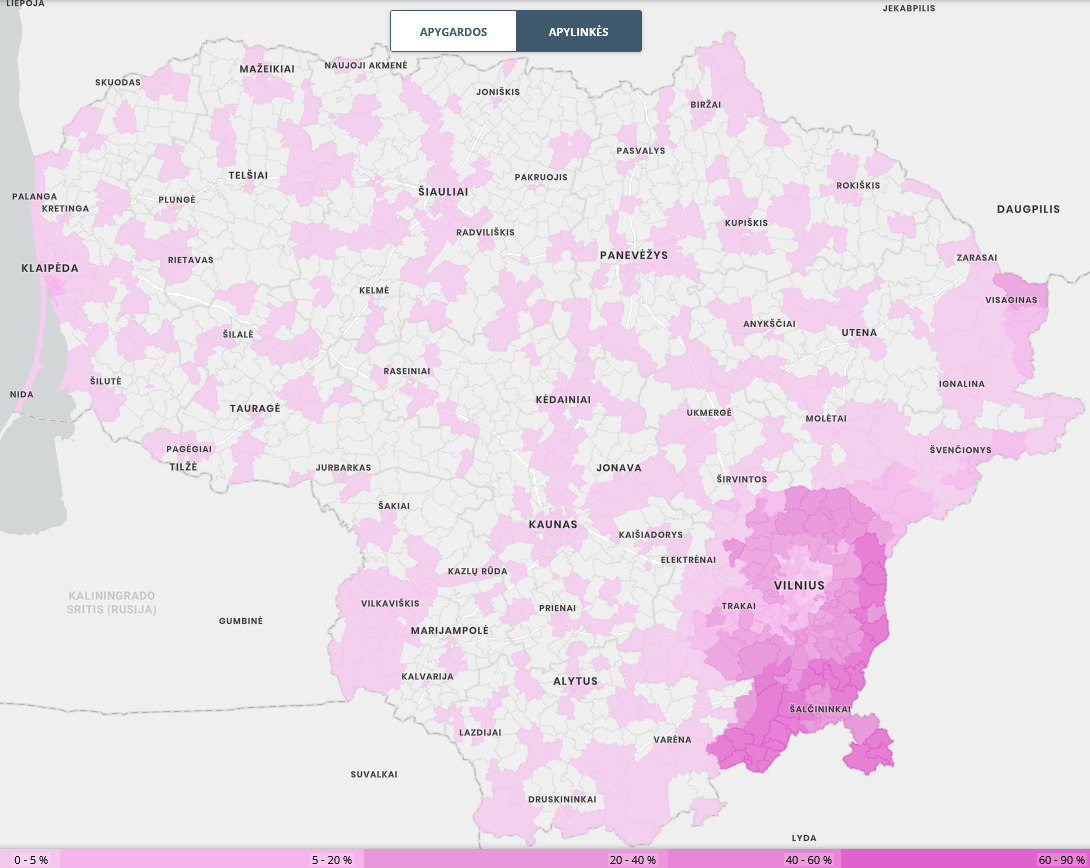
Elderships where Electoral Action of Poles in Lithuania – Christian Families Alliance received votes during 2024 Lithuania's parliamentary election (in pink)

The Electoral Action of Poles in Lithuania – Christian Families Alliance is an ethnic minority-based political party formed in 1994, able to exert significant political influence in the administrative districts where Poles form a majority or significant minority. This party has held seats in the Seimas (Parliament of Lithuania) for the past decade. In the 2020 and 2024 Lithuanian parliamentary elections it received just below 4.97% and 3.88% of the national vote, respectively. The party is more active in local politics and controls several municipal councils. It cooperates with other minorities, mainly the Lithuanian Russian Union.

The Union of Poles in Lithuania is an organization formed in 1989 to bring together Polish activists in Lithuania. It numbers between 6,000 and 11,000 members. Its work concerns the civil rights of the Polish minority and engages in educational, cultural, and economic activities.

== Prominent Poles ==
=== Prior to 1940 ===
- Gabriel Narutowicz – president of Poland
- Józef Piłsudski – Polish statesman
- Wiktor Budzyński – politician
- Kanuty Rusiecki – painter
- Michał Pius Römer – lawyer
- Sofija Pšibiliauskienė – writer (Polish: Zofia Przybylewska)
- Marija Lastauskienė – writer (Polish: Maria Lastowska)
- Medard Czobot – politician (Lithuanian: Medardas Čobotas)

=== Since 1990 ===
- Anicet Brodawski – a Polish autonomist leader during the late 1980s
- Darjuš Lavrinovič (Polish: Dariusz Ławrynowicz) – basketball player
- Kšyštof Lavrinovič (Polish: Krzysztof Ławrynowicz) – basketball player
- Artur Liudkovski (Polish: Artur Ludkowski) – former deputy mayor of Vilnius
- Jarosław Niewierowicz (Lithuanian: Jaroslav Neverovič) – former minister of energy, former vice-minister of foreign affairs
- Czesław Okińczyc (Lithuanian: Česlav Okinčic) – politician, journalist
- Artur Płokszto (Lithuanian: Artur Plokšto) – secretary of Ministry of National Defence
- Leokadia Poczykowska (Lithuanian: Leokadija Počikovska) – politician
- Ewelina Saszenko (Lithuanian: Evelina Sašenko) – singer
- Jan Sienkiewicz (Lithuanian: Jan Senkevič) –– politician, journalist
- Waldemar Tomaszewski (Lithuanian: Valdemar Tomaševski) – leader of Electoral Action of Poles in Lithuania – Christian Families Alliance
- Stanisław Widtmann (Stanislavas Vidtmannas) – (as of 2011) vice-minister of culture in ethnic minorities affairs.
- Jarosław Wołkonowski – dean of branch of University of Białystok in Vilnius
- Alina Orłowska – singer (Lithuanian: Alina Orlova)
- Michał Mackiewicz – politician (Lithuanian: Michal Mackevič)
- Irena Litwinowicz – politician (Lithuanian: Irena Litvinovič)
- Zbigniew Balcewicz – politician (Lithuanian: Zbignev Balcevič)

== See also ==
- Lithuania–Poland relations
- Krajowcy
- Kresy
- Lithuanian minority in Poland
- Pochodnia, Polish cultural association in the interwar Lithuania
- Polish National Territorial Region

== Bibliography ==
=== English-language sources ===
- Budrytė, Dovilė (2005). Taming Nationalism?: Political Community Building in the Post-Soviet Baltic States. Aldershot: Ashgate Publishing. ISBN 0-7546-3757-3.
- Clemens, Walter C. (1991). Baltic Independence and Russian Empire. St. Martin's Press. p. 150. ISBN 0-312-04806-8.
- Lane, A. T. (2001). Lithuania: Stepping Westward. Routledge.
- Lipscomb, Glenard P.; Committee for a Free Lithuania (29 May 1958). "Extension of Remarks". Congressional Record Vol. 104 – Appendix. Superintendent of Government Documents.
- Kamusella, Tomasz (2008). The Politics of Language and Nationalism in Modern Central Europe. Palgrave Macmillan. ISBN 9780230550704.
- Sanford, George (1999). Poland: the conquest of history. Taylor & Francis.
- Senn, Alfred Erich (1997). "Nationality Questions in the Baltic. The Lithuanian Example". In van Horne, Winston A. (ed.). Global Convulsions: Race, Ethnicity, and Nationalism at the End of the Twentieth Century.
- Stone, Daniel Z. (2014-07-01). The Polish-Lithuanian State, 1386–1795. University of Washington Press. ISBN 978-0-295-80362-3.
- Potašenko, Grigorijus (2008). Multinational Lithuania: History of Ethnic Minorities. Šviesa. ISBN 978-5430052508.
- Wade, Peter (2007). Race, Ethnicity and Nation: Perspectives from Kinship and Genetics. Berghahn Books. ISBN 978-1-84545-355-8.
- Weeks, Theodore R. (2015-12-04). Vilnius between Nations, 1795–2000. Cornell University Press. ISBN 978-1-5017-5808-9.

=== Lithuanian-language sources ===
- Budreckis, Algirdas (1967). "Etnografinės Lietuvos Rytinės ir Pietinės Sienos". Karys.
- Butkus, A. (16 December 2015). "Lietuvos gyventojai tautybės požiūriu".
- Šapoka, Adolfas (2013). Raštai. Vol. I – Vilniaus Istorija (in Lithuanian). Vilnius: Edukologija.
- Veblaitis, P. (1956). "Sąmokslas prieš lietuviškas pavardes". Karys.
- Zinkevičius, Zigmas (2010-11-20). "Lietuviškos ir nelietuviškos pavardės". Gimtoji kalba (in Lithuanian). Vol. 9. pp. 7–11.
- Zinkevičius, Zigmas (31 January 2014). "Lenkiškai kalbantys lietuviai" [Polish-speaking Lithuanians]. alkas.lt (in Lithuanian).
- Zinkevičius, Zigmas (21 August 2018). "Suvalkų ir Augustavo krašto pavardės. Polonizacijos apybraiža (II)" [Surnames of Suvalkai and Augustavas region. Outline of Polonization (II)]. alkas.lt (in Lithuanian).

=== Polish-language sources ===
- Januszewska-Jurkiewicz, Joanna (2010). Stosunki narodowościowe na Wileńszczyźnie w latach 1920–1939 [National Relations in the Vilnius Region in the Years 1920–1939]. Katowice.
- Jundo-Kaliszewska, Barbara (2019). Zakładnicy historii. Mniejszość polska w postradzieckiej Litwie [Hostages of history. The Polish minority in post-Soviet Lithuania] (in Polish). Łódź.
- Kupczak, Janusz M. (1998). "Z problematyki stosunków narodowościowych na Litwie współczesnej". Politologia. XXII.
- Łossowski, Piotr; Bronius Makauskas (2005). Andrzej Koryna (ed.). Kraje bałtyckie w latach przełomu 1934–1944 (in Polish). Warszawa: Instytut Historii PAN; Fundacja Pogranicze. ISBN 83-88909-42-8.
- Plater, Stanisław (1825). Jeografia wschodniéy części Europy czyli Opis krajów przez wielorakie narody słowiańskie zamieszkanych : obejmujący Prussy, Xsięztwo Poznańskie, Szląsk Pruski, Gallicyą, Rzeczpospolitę Krakowską, Krolestwo Polskie i Litwę [Geography of the Eastern Part of Europe, or Description of the Countries inhabited by Various Slavic Nations: Including Prussia, the Duchy of Posen, Prussian Silesia, Galicia, the Republic of Cracow, the Kingdom of Poland, and Lithuania] (in Polish). Wrocław: Wilhelm Bogumił Korn.
- Rachuba, Andrzej (2010). "Litwini". In Kopczyński, Michał; Tygielski, Wojciech (eds.). Pod wspólnym niebem. Narody dawnej Rzeczypospolitej [Under a Common Sky. Peoples of the former Commonwealth] (in Polish). Warsaw. ISBN 978-83-11-11724-2.
- Srebrakowski, Aleksander (2001). Polacy w Litewskiej SSR (in Polish). Adam Marszałek. ISBN 83-7174-857-4.
- Topolska, Maria Barbara (1987). "Polacy w Wielkim Księstwie Litewskim w XVI–XVIII w. (Przyczynek do dziejów polskiej emigracji na wschód w okresie staropolskim)". Lituano-Slavica Posnaniensia: Studia historica (in Polish). 2. Adam Mickiewicz University in Poznań. ISSN 0860-0066.
- Topolska, Maria Barbara (2002). Społeczeństwo i kultura w Wielkim Księstwie Litewskim od XV do XVIII wieku (in Polish). Bogucki Wydawnictwo Naukowe. ISBN 83-89290-07-3.
- Trimonienė, Rita (2006). "Polonizacja". Kultura Wielkiego Księstwa Litewskiego. Analizy i obrazy. Kraków. pp. 544–560.
- Turska, Halina (1930). "Język polski na Wileńsczyzne". Wilno i Ziemia Wilenska (in Polish). Vol. I. Polska Drukarnia Nakładowa "LUX" Ludwika Chomińskiego.
- Zbigniew Kurcz, "Mniejszość polska na Wileńszczyźnie", Wydawnictwo Uniwersytetu Wrocławskiego, Wrocław 2005, ISSN 0239-6661, ISBN 83-229-2601-4.

=== Belarusian-language sources ===
- Внуковіч, Ю. (2023). Маркеры этнічнай ідэнтычнасці жыхароў Віленшчыны (па матэрыялах палявых этнаграфічных экспедыцый пачатку ХХІ ст.) [Markers of the Ethnic Identity of the Inhabitants of Vilnius Region (on the Material of Ethnographic Field Expeditions of the Beginning of the 21st Century)]. Studia Białorutenistyczne (in Belarusian). 17: 65–87. doi:10.17951/sb.2023.17.65-87.
