= Wiktor Budzyński =

Lithuanian politician

- Born: March 7, 1888; Eustachy, Suwałki Governorate, Congress Poland
- Died: 1976 (aged 87–88); Puszczykowo, Poznań Voivodeship, Polish People's Republic
- Other name: Viktoras Budzinskis
- Education: Jagiellonian University
- Organization: Pochodnia

Wiktor Budzyński (Lithuanian: Viktoras Budzinskis; 7 March 1888 – 1976) was an ethnic Polish politician, active in the interbellum period in the Republic of Lithuania. He was the leader of the Polish minority in Lithuania, also between 1924 and 1927 a deputy to the Seimas, elected from the district of Kaunas.

== Biography ==
Budzyński was born in the village of Eustachow, near Vilkaviškis. He attended schools in Marijampolė and Riga, where he graduated in 1907. Between 1907 and 1911 he studied at Kraków's Jagiellonian University, then returned to his native village and managed a farm. During World War I, he was evacuated to Mohylew, where took care of Polish refugees.

After the war Budzynski returned to Lithuania and was elected to the Parliament. Also, from 1924 to 1935 he was the director of Association of Poles in Lithuania Pochodnia. In 1935 he withdrew from public life.

During World War II he lived in Vilnius, and in 1945 moved to Greater Poland, settling in Puszczykowo, near Poznań, where he died.

== Sources ==
- Jackiewicz Mieczysław, "Polacy na Litwie 1918-2000", Warszawa 2003
- Buchowski Krzysztof, "Polacy w niepodleglym panstwie litewskim 1918-1940", Białystok 1999, ISBN 978-83-87881-06-1.
