= Irena Litvinovič =

Irena Litvinovič (Polish: Irena Litwinowicz-Bojarowicz) (born 23 August 1958, Vilnius, Lithuania) is a Polish-Lithuanian educator, theatre director, politician and cultural activist for the community of Poles in Lithuania.

In 1991 she graduated from the Leningrad Institute of Culture with specialty of theatre director. Since 1992 she is artistic director and (theatre) director of the Polish Theater in Vilnius (pro bono), as well as the manager of the theatre studio at the Adam Mickiewicz Gymnasium in Vilnius (employment).

She was a member of the Vilnius city council for terms 2003-2007 and 2007–2011.

She is married to Česlav Litvinovič and has daughter Barbara.

She speaks in Polish, Lithuanian, German, and Russian.

== Awards ==
Her awards and decorations include:

- 2010: Knight's Cross of the Order of Merit of the Republic of Poland
- 2004: Honorary badge For Merit to Polish Culture
- 2002: Gold Cross of Merit (Poland)
