= 1932 LFF Lyga =

LFF Lyga
- Season: 1932

The 1932 LFF Lyga was the 11th season of the LFF Lyga football competition in Lithuania. It was contested by 8 teams, and LFLS Kaunas won the championship.

== League standings ==
Pos	Team	Pld	W	D	L	GF	GA	GD	Pts
1	LFLS Kaunas	7	6	0	1	20	6	+14	12
2	KSS Klaipėda	7	5	2	0	29	7	+22	12
3	LGSF Kaunas	7	3	2	2	18	9	+9	8
4	Sveikata Kybartai	7	4	0	3	12	3	+9	8
5	Kovas Kaunas	7	2	3	2	18	9	+9	7
6	Makabi Kaunas	7	2	1	4	9	29	−20	5
7	Freya VfR Klaipėda	7	1	1	5	5	10	−5	3
8	Makabi Šiauliai	7	0	1	6	2	34	−32	1

Source: rsssf.com

=== Playoff ===
- LFLS Kaunas 6-1 KSS Klaipėda
