= 1937–38 LFF Lyga =

LFF Lyga
- Season: 1937–38
- Champions: KSS Klaipėda
- Matches: 90
- Goals: 330 (3.67 per match)

The 1937–38 LFF Lyga was the 17th season of the LFF Lyga football competition in Lithuania. It was contested by 10 teams, and KSS Klaipėda won the championship.

== League standings ==
Pos	Team	Pld	W	D	L	GF	GA	GD	Pts
1	KSS Klaipėda	18	12	2	4	54	20	+34	26
2	LGSF Kaunas	18	12	2	4	43	18	+25	26
3	Švyturys Klaipėda	18	11	2	5	34	20	+14	24
4	Kovas Kaunas	18	9	5	4	44	24	+20	23
5	MSK Kaunas	18	7	7	4	36	25	+11	21
6	LFLS Kaunas	18	8	4	6	34	22	+12	20
7	CJSO Kaunas	18	7	2	9	30	30	0	16
8	Makabi Kaunas	18	5	3	10	25	45	−20	13
9	JSO Kybartai	18	2	2	14	15	60	−45	6
10	Sakalas Šiauliai	18	2	1	15	15	66	−51	5

Source: rsssf.com

=== Playoff ===
- KSS Klaipėda 3-1 LGSF Kaunas
