= Sparta Kowno =

Former Polish sports club in Lithuania

PKS Sparta Kowno
- Full name: Polski Klub Sportowy Sparta Kowno
- Short name: Sparta
- Founded: 1926
- Dissolved: 1938
- Owner: Pochodnia
colors

Sparta Kowno was a sports club founded in 1926 in the Republic of Lithuania in Kaunas by the local Polish community. The club had sections for football, cycling, volleyball, basketball, hockey, athletics, tennis, rowing, kayaking, boxing, and skiing. The club was dissolved in 1938.

== History ==
The idea of establishing a Polish sports club emerged in 1919 when the Lithuanian authorities dissolved the Kaunas branch of the Sokół Gymnastic Society. In 1920, the Polish community attempted to register the Kaunas Polish Sports Club Sparta, but the application was rejected. In response, the Polish cultural society Pochodnia, founded in 1924, created a gymnastics section and attempted to field a football team, Sparta, in the Lithuanian league. However, the league authorities denied the team entry, citing the lack of an organized sports club structure.

After the 1926 parliamentary elections and the formation of a left-wing government that respected the rights of national minorities, Pochodnia succeeded in registering a sports club under the name Sport, which was soon changed to Sparta. In 1928, the Polish sports club Ursus was founded in Panevėžys as a section of the Oświata society. The following year, it became a branch of Sparta. In 1929, another branch was established in Ukmergė, but it was suspended after a few months by the authorities following a brawl between the club’s football players and Lithuanian youth from the Lithuanian Riflemen's Union. By 1935, additional branches were established in Biržai, Jonava, Krūvandai, and Kėdainiai, as well as a reinstated branch in Ukmergė. However, the Ukmergė branch was dissolved again in 1935 by order of the Lithuanian authorities.

In September 1935, an argument broke out between Polish football players of Sparta's Ukmergė branch and Lithuanian spectators, who were chanting anti-Polish slogans. The dispute escalated into a brawl, prompting police intervention. As a result, 32 people—all Sparta players, officials, and supporters—were arrested on charges of hooliganism and using the Polish language during the match. The team’s coach was accused of "deliberately organizing riots" and was sentenced to exile in another district. The Ukmergė branch was once again shut down, and the remaining detainees were also punished.

The atmosphere surrounding the Polish minority gradually deteriorated, and opportunities for sports and cultural activities became increasingly restricted. In May 1937, which was declared in Lithuania as the "Month of Solidarity with the Vilnius Region," Lithuanian and Jewish clubs announced a boycott of Sparta Kowno. In response, Sparta organized friendly matches, including games against Reduta, a Polish club from Riga.

Due to the reform of the association laws in early 1938, the statutes of five Polish organizations, including Sparta, were refused approval. This effectively led to the dissolution of the sports club. In this situation, Pochodnia submitted an application to register a new sports club, Slavia, as early as January 1938. However, a negative decision was made in August 1938. After the improvement in Polish-Lithuanian relations in 1939, Slavia Kaunas was registered, but its local branches were not. In fact, the club never fully resumed its activities, especially since, due to the occupation of Poland by Nazi Germany and the Soviet Union, the Lithuanian state no longer saw it as serving its interests.

== Achievements ==
The football section of Sparta competed in the top tier of the Kaunas Lithuania League. In 1927, the team finished fifth in the league, fourth in 1928, fifth in 1929, and sixth in 1930. After the league reform and the creation of a single central league, Sparta was relegated to a lower division. Two years later, Sparta won the second-tier league competition.

Besides football, the club had multiple sports divisions, including volleyball, basketball, athletics, and cycling. One of its primary objectives was to educate Polish youth in a patriotic spirit. Among the club’s notable athletes was Włodzimierz Jankowski, a Sparta cyclist who represented Lithuania at the 1928 Olympic Games in Amsterdam. Another well-known athlete was tennis player Czesław Janczewski, one of the best Polish competitors in Kaunas. Club activists included Witold Żenkiewicz, Kazimierz Janczewski, Konrad Łapin, Witold Lutyk, Tadeusz Lancewicz, and Zenon Koczan.

== Bibliography ==
- Buchowski, Krzysztof (1999). Polacy w niepodległym państwie litewskim. 1918–1940 (in Polish). University of Białystok. ISBN 8387881066.
