= Slavery in Lithuania =

The Third Statute of Lithuania abolished slavery in 1588. Serfdom or baudžiava (Lithuanian for 'to punish') which is, in turn, derived from Lithuanian bausmė (punishment) on the territory of Grand Duchy of Lithuania, continued to exist throughout Rzeczpospolita period and later under the rule of Russian empire until Emancipation reform of 1861.

== History ==
From the 14th century onward (about the same time ethnic Lithuania was converted from paganism to Christianity), the feudal system had been imposed on the vast majority of the population, mainly by Polish nobles, who along with Polish clergy, imposed Christianity on the Baltic tribes.

In the second half of the 16th century, the Volok Reform has destroyed the remnants of peasant land ownership, consolidated its feudal monopoly, separated the classes of nobles and peasants (serfs); peasant land became the property of the grand duke. Peasants turned into serfs made up more than 1/2 of all Lithuanian peasants. The landowners in Lithuania at that time were often foreigners – Polish, German, Russian, and some Polonized or Russianized Lithuanians. Polish language and culture became high culture, subordinating Lithuanian language and culture much as ethnic Lithuanians were subordinated by feudal bondage or serfdom. Serfdom was, by definition, a form of land bondage: essentially, slavery to the feudal noble in the form of unpaid labor on the lands of his estate. Serfs were legally bonded to the land, so whoever owned the land "owned" them. Such bondage continued generation after generation, with serfs subject to whipping, even torture or murder, at the whim of nobles and their estate managers.

During the 18th century in the last third of Polish–Lithuanian Commonwealth, the process of modernization of society began. On 3 May 1791 that trend was reflected in the adopted constitution, but further spontaneous development was stopped by the conquerors and Third Partition of 1795.

In 1795, after the annexation of Lithuania (without Užnemunė and Klaipėda region) to Russia, serfdom became harsher. Peasants began to be sold without land. Peasants had to perform the heavy duty of Rekrut. In Western Europe, serfs, unlike slaves, could not be bought, sold, or traded individually though they could, depending on the area, be sold together with land. Serfs in Eastern Europe or kholop as called in Russia, by contrast, could be traded like regular slaves, could be abused with no rights over their own bodies, could not leave the land they were bound to, and could marry only with their lord's permission. Government officials spoke only Russian. After unsuccessful Lithuanian uprisings against the Russians in 1830 and 1831, whose activists were executed or exiled to Siberia: "The rebels' landholdings were parceled out to court favorites and other Russians in a far-reaching colonization process that led to a large Russian influx".

Lithuanian serfs were not freed until a decree by the Russian czar in 1861. But that declaration, much like the 1863 Emancipation Proclamation in the US, was not accompanied by land reform. In short, freed Lithuanian serfs were not granted their own version of "40 acres and a mule", so their only resort, if remaining in Lithuania, was to continue to work on post-feudal estates for starvation wages, and to largely remain subject to the rough "justice" of still powerful, neo-feudal lords. Available education to Lithuanians was limited – books and newspapers in Lithuanian language were prohibited due to Lithuanian press ban from 1864 until 1904 as a form of repression after unsuccessful January Uprising.

== Crimean slave trade ==
Political map of Black Sea region around 1600.

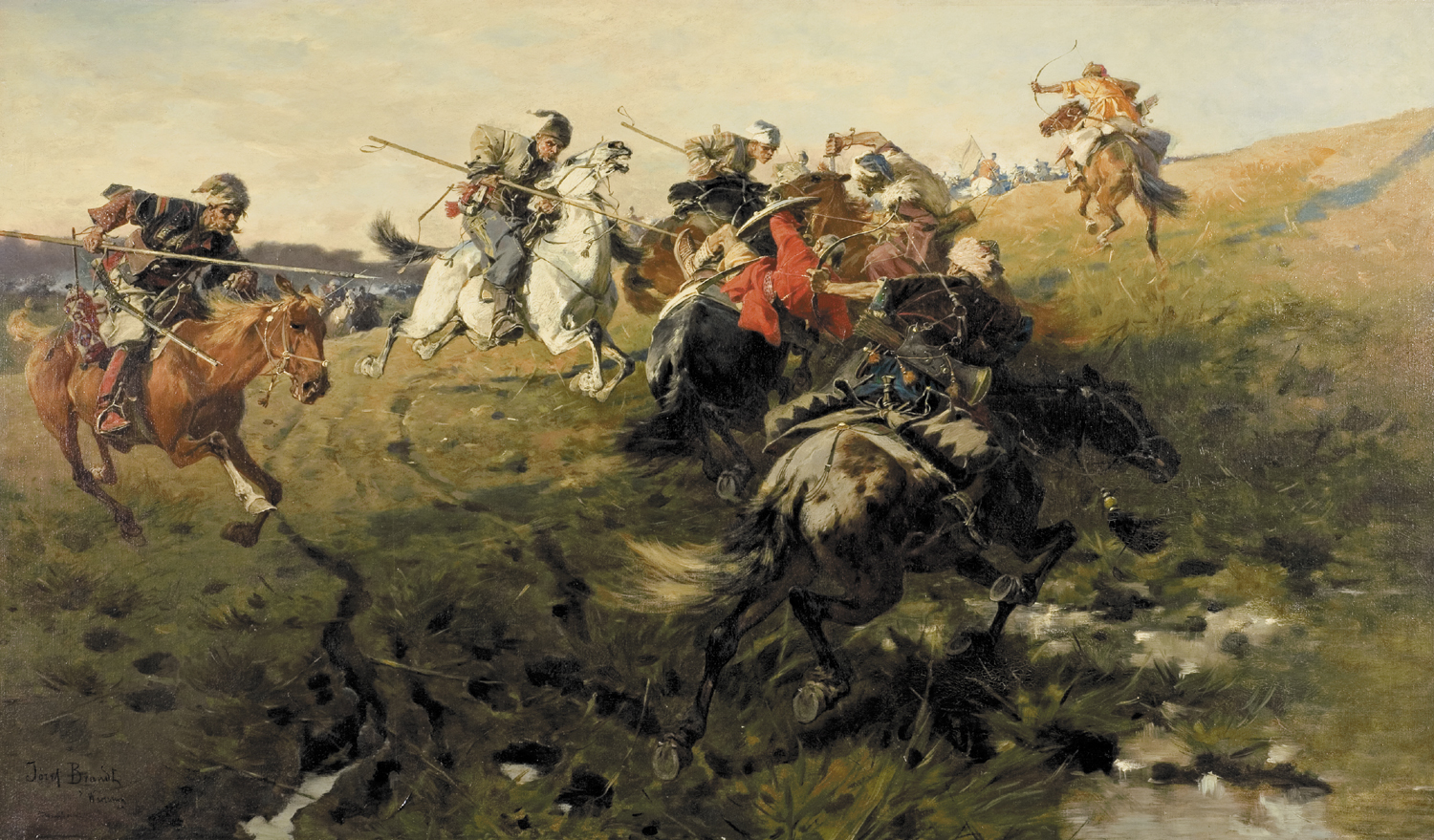
Skirmish Between Cossacks and Tatars.

Poland and Lithuania came to play an important role during late middle ages and the early modern period as a slave supply source for the infamous Crimean slave trade.

During the Early Modern age the Crimean Khanate (1441–1783) was a major center of the international slave trade. The Crimean slave trade was the main source of income of the Khanate, and one of the biggest supply sources to slavery in the Ottoman Empire. The Crimean slave trade in Eastern Europe, and the Barbary slave trade in West and South Europe, were the two main sources of European slaves to the Ottoman Empire.

During this period the Crimea was the base of the Crimean–Nogai slave raids in Eastern Europe, and European slaves were trafficked to the Middle East via the Crimea. The Nogai Horde were vassals of the Crimean Khanate and economically dependent upon the slave trade, and performed the slave raids independently, or in collaboration with the Crimean Tatars, who were dependent on slave trade and slave labor on their estates.

In this time period, Poland and Lithuania were united, and Ukraine was a part of Poland–Lithuania. The slaves were captured in southern Russia, Poland–Lithuania, Moldavia, Wallachia, and Circassia by Tatar horsemen in a trade known as the "harvesting of the steppe". Slave raids were regularly conducted by the Nogai Horde and or the Crimean Tatars toward Russia, Poland–Lithuania, and the Caucasus twice every year; during the harvest and during the winter for centuries. The first major Crimean–Nogai raid were conducted toward South Eastern Poland in 1468, and the last slave raid was conducted in 1769, during the Russo-Turkish War (1768–1774), when 20,000 people were taken captive.

A Ukrainian folk song remembered the despair and devastation of the slave raids:

"The fires are burning behind the river.
The Tatars are dividing their captives.
Our village is burnt and our property plundered.
Old mother is sabred and my dear is taken into captivity."

The majority of the slaves captured were forced into slave caravans by land and then by sea to the city of Caffa, which was an Ottoman province in the Crimean Khanate and a major center of the Crimean slave trade. Polish-Lithuanian captives were marched down to the port of Ochakiv, where they were loaded on to slave ships and trafficked to Caffa in the Crimea. There were reportedly always around 30,000 slaves in Caffa. The Lithuanian Mikhalon Litvin referred to Caffa in the 16th century as: "not a town, but an abyss into which our blood is pouring". From Caffa, the captives were distributed between the Ottomans and the Crimean Tatars, and some were distributed to the smaller slave markets in the Crimean Khanate, while the rest were sold in Caffa and trafficked to the rest of the Ottoman Empire and the Islamic Middle East.

It is not documented exactly how many raids were conducted, where and how, and exactly the number of people abducted between the late 15th century and the late 18th century. Between 1474 and 1569, 75 major slave raids are estimated to have been conducted toward Polish–Lithuanian territory. During the year of 1676 alone, circa 40,000 people are estimated to have been abducted from the territory of Volhynia-Podolia-Galicia, and at least 20,000 people are estimated to have been abducted from the territory of Poland–Lithuania every year between 1500 and 1644, or at least one million people. Among the most known victims of the Crimean slave raids from Poland were Roxelana. Polish was such a common ethnicity for a slave in the Crimea Khanate, that the Polish language was the second language in the Crimea. A Polish proverb described death as a better fate than being captured by a slave raid:

"O how much better to lie on one's bier, than to be captive on the way to Tatary".

The Crimean slave trade is estimated to have been as large in numbers as the Transatlantic slave trade until the 18th century, when the Atlantic slave trade exploded and surpassed the Crimean slave trade in numbers. In 1783, the Crimean Khanate was dissolved after the Russian annexation of Crimea, which finally eliminated the Crimean slave trade.

== Outcome ==
In 1918, after much struggle and First World War, Lithuanians had opportunity to gain independence. Act of Independence of Lithuania was signed by the Council of Lithuania on February 16, 1918, proclaiming the restoration of an independent State of Lithuania, governed by democratic principles, with Vilnius as its capital. This was the first time in several hundred years that Lithuanians had a free choice of occupations and began entering trades, professions, and commerce.

== See also ==
- Slavery in Poland
- Slavery in Russia
- Black Sea slave trade
