= Heinrich Pick =

German jurist and politician (1882–1947)

Mayor of Szczecin
- In office 1920–1933
- Preceded by: Carl Thode
- Succeeded by: Erich Mix

Personal details
- Born: 16 November 1882 Wrocław, Prussia, German Empire (now part of Poland)
- Died: 28 October 1947 (aged 64) Wiesbaden, American occupation zone in Germany (now part of Germany)

Heinrich Georg Pick (German: [ˈhaɪn.ʁɪç ˈɡeː.ɔrk ˈpiːk]; 16 November 1882 – 28 October 1947) was a German jurist and politician. He was the mayor of Szczecin from 1920 to 1933.

== Biography ==
Heinrich Pick was born on 16 November 1882, in Wrocław within the Kingdom of Prussia in the German Empire (now part of Poland). He was the son of bank director and city councilor Georg Pick, and Marie Pick (née Sachs). His father was of a Jewish descent. Heinrich also had a brother Sigmund Pick.

Pick graduated a high school in Wrocław, and studied the jurisprudence in Freiburg im Breisgau. In 1900, during his studies, he joined the Saxo-Silesia Freiburg student association. After graduation, he became a lawyer-in-training in Freiburg im Breisgau, and was in the reserve force of the 5th Baden Infantry Regiment No. 113 of the Prussian Army. In 1910, Pick was the keynote speaker at the 25th anniversary celebration of his student association, with his speech being titled The Speech on German Fraternity (German: Rede auf die Deutsche Burschenschaft).

In 1912, Pick became a city assessor, and in 1917, a city councilor in Barmen. On 17 January 1918, he married Margarethe Duisber. From 1920 to 1933, he was the mayor of Szczecin.

In 1933, after the Nazi takeover of the government, he and his brother resigned from Saxo-Silesia Freiburg. His brother then emigrated to England, where he later committed suicide. Heinrich Pick was deported and placed in the Theresienstadt Ghetto in Terezín, in the Protectorate of Bohemia and Moravia. He survived the Holocaust and Second World War.

Pick died on 28 October 1947 as a result of an illness in a hospital in Wiesbaden in the American occupation zone in Germany (now part of Germany).
