= Pochodnia =

Polish cultural association in Lithuania

Pochodnia (transl. Torch, full name: the Association for the Promotion of Culture and Education "Torch", Polish: Towarzystwo Popierania Kultury i Oświaty "Pochodnia") was a cultural association of Poles in Lithuania. The first chairman was Wiktor Budzyński (1924-1935), who was succeeded by Jan Przeździecki and Czesław Mackiewicz. Its activities included education, libraries, theatre, museums, exhibitions, press and literature. The association's most important activity was centered around school and post-school education. It managed a number of pre-schools and private primary schools. In 1935 it managed 19 Polish after-school cultural centers (Polish: Świetlica polska) with over 12,000 participants, and a central library with 115 library outlets.
