= Polish–Lithuanian Wars (13th–14th centuries) =

During the Polish–Lithuanian wars of the 13th and 14th centuries, the neighbouring Lithuanian state (Kingdom and Grand Duchy at different times) and Polish states, especially Duchy of Masovia, frequently clashed.

Sometimes, the armed clashes took the form of plundering expeditions organized by Lithuanian princes (Kunigas) on Polish lands. The aim of these expeditions was not to seize territory, but to seize prisoners and loot. These expeditions sometimes caused retaliatory actions by Polish princes on the territory of Lithuania. These fights, although interrupted by a temporary alliance between Władysław I Łokietek and Gediminas, lasted in practice until the Act of Krėva in 1385

== Background ==
In the 1100s, Polish Dukes of Masovia began attacking the neighboring Old Prussian and Yotvingian lands, which were both Balts, just as the Lithuanians.

The Duke of Masovia Konrad I of Masovia, together with the Prussian bishop Christian of Oliva, established the Order of Dobrzyń in Masovia in 1228 to fight the Prussians. In 1230, he allowed the Teutonic Order to settle in the Chełmno Land (German: Kulm) and establish their State, fighting together against the Prussians, terrorizing the Yotvingian lands, which is why Lithuania sought to weaken Masovia in the 1260s-1270s.

Initially, Lithuania was politically fragmented. However, the threat from the Teutonic Order and the Livonian Brothers of the Sword intensified the unification tendencies. In 1230s, one of the dukes (kunigaikštis), Mindaugas, defeated the remaining princes and united the Lithuanian lands under his rule. During his time, the duchy began conquering the Ruthenian principalities located to the south, which, weakened by Tatar raids, became easy prey for the Lithuanians. At the same time, Mindaugas and his leaders began systematic raids on Polish lands, which were then in a phase of feudal fragmentation during the Piast dynasty. The individual fragments of the Polish state were ruled by separate, often quarreling princes, which made it difficult to organize an effective defense.

== 13th century ==
In the years 1200–1263, Mindaugas' troops invaded Poland nearly fourteen times. The policy of invasions was continued by Mindaugas' successors.

In 1262, the dukes Treniota and Švarnas organized a campaign against Kulm and Masovia, ravaged the lands of Płock and Czersk. The duke Siemowit I of Masovia was killed, and his son Conrad was taken prisoner. The Lithuanians attacked Masovia in 1263, 1266, 1267, 1269, and 1277. At the same time, the invasions of Polish lands had a different character than the conquest-oriented Lithuanian expeditions to Ruthenia, as their goal was mainly to capture loot. According to the Polish historian Jasienica, Mindaugas built an extensive Lithuanian state on the loot from Poland and territorial conquests in Ruthenia. The invasions were also the result of the initiative of some Masovian or Kuyavian princes (Konrad I of Masovia, Casimir I of Kuyavia), who used Lithuanians in the fight against their Piast relatives.

One of Mindaugas' successors, Traidenis, developed a whole system of settling Lithuania with prisoners from the Ruthenian lands and Poland. His raids reached as far as the areas of Łęczyca and Kalisz. One of Siemowit's sons, Bolesław II of Masovia, wanting to secure his province, concluded an alliance with Traidenis, which he strengthened by marrying his daughter Gaudemunda of Lithuania. In 1279, and Traidenis himself married Conrad's daughter Ludmila, some of the Masovians (also called Masurians) maintained good relations with the Lithuanians until the mid-1330s.

In 1282, the Duke of Kraków, Leszek II the Black, defeated the Lithuanian invasion in the Battle of Rowiny, which temporarily stopped the invasions. After the 1286 campaign of the Grand Ducal Lithuanian Army to Masovia, Conrad was also forced to withdraw from the Teutonic Order.

== 14th century ==
During the war with the Teutonic Order of 1294–95, the Lithuanians used the Wizna castle of the Masovian Duke Wenceslaus of Płock on the lower bank of the Vistula. After the King of Bohemia John of Luxembourg forced the Masovian dukes to support the Teutonic Order again, the Lithuanians led by Dovydas Gardiniškis ravaged Pułtusk, the estate of the Bishop of Płock, in 1324.

At the beginning of the 14th century, Władysław I Łokietek united part of the Polish lands. The common threat from the Teutonic Order prompted him to conclude an alliance with the Lithuanian prince Gediminas in 1325. The alliance was strengthened by the marriage of Władysław's successor, Casimir III the Great, the future king, to the grand duke's daughter, Aldona of Lithuania. As part of this alliance, the Lithuanian and Polish armies jointly raided Branderburg, reaching Berlin and Frankfurt.

In early 14th century, the Grand Duke of Lithuania Vytenis regained part of the Yotvingian lands in Podlachia from Masovian control, which had been ravaged, captured and divided by Masovia, Volhynia and the Teutonic Order at the end of the 13th century.

In the second half of the 1320s–mid-1350s, Masovia was neutral with regards to Lithuania. Wenceslaus married Danutė Gediminaitė, the daughter of the Grand Duke of Lithuania Gediminas, in 1321. In 1323, Gediminas assisted the Masovian dukes in their fight with the Teutonic Order over Dobrzyń. In 1331, Yuri II Boleslav, the Duke of Masovia as well as Galicia–Volhynia (Traidenis' grandson), married another daughter of Gediminas, Euphemia Gediminaitė. Through Masovia, Gediminas maintained relations with Western Europe and invited foreigners to travel to Lithuania through its lands.

In the summer of 1337, the Masovian knights defeated the Lithuanian troops crossing the Narew River in the Battle of Pułtusk.

=== Galicia–Volhynia Wars ===
During the reign of Casimir the Great, fighting flared up again, as both sides sought to take over the Kingdom of Galicia–Volhynia. The war for the principality, the Galicia–Volhynia Wars, were fought intermittently in the years 1340–1366, ended with the division of its territories.

In the mid and late 14th century, Masovia assisted its suzerain Poland (especially its king Casimir III the Great) during its battles with Lithuania over Galicia–Volhynia. In 1349, 1368–79, Lithuania launched retaliatory campaigns against Masovia.

Later, wars with Masovia were fought over the Lithuanian lands in Podlachia. The Masovian Duke Janusz I the Old (who married Kęstutis' daughter Danutė Kęstutaitė c. 1373), taking advantage of Kęstutis's struggle with the Grand Duke of Lithuania Jogaila, occupied Podlachia in 1382; Vytautas the Great recaptured it in 1383. Jogaila, who became King of Poland in 1386, attracted the Duke Siemowit IV of Masovia to his side by marrying of his sister Alexandra of Lithuania in 1388. This also succeeded in restoring traditional dynastic ties between Masovia's Piast dynasty and the Gediminids.

After the death of Casimir the Great, in 1370 the Lithuanians attacked and occupied the duchies of Volodymyr, Belz and Chełm. This was the last major Lithuanian invasion. In 1377 King Louis I of Hungary organized an expedition to regain the lost lands.

During the time of Jadwiga of Poland, talks began between Polish representatives and the Lithuanian prince Jogaila about an alliance between Poland and Lithuania, due to the threat to both countries from the Teutonic Knights. In 1385, the Act of Krėva was concluded. The agreement provided for the marriage of the Grand Duke of Lithuania Jogaila to Jadwiga and his assumption of the Polish throne, in exchange for which the Grand Duke undertook to accept baptism (second baptism of Lithuania since Mindaugas) and Christianize Lithuania. One of the conditions of the agreement was the return to the Kingdom of prisoners abducted by the Lithuanians and forcibly settled on the lands of the Grand Duchy.

The alliance ended Lithuanian plundering expeditions into Polish lands, but did not end all wars. Among the last medieval Polish–Lithuanian was in 1431 – the Lutsk War and was a prelude to the Lithuanian Civil War (1432–1438).

Duke Bolesław IV of Warsaw and another Masovian duke Casimir II of Belz, taking advantage of the assassination of the Grand Duke of Lithuania Sigismund Kęstutaitis (1440), reoccupied most of Podlachia in 1440. The Grand Duke of Lithuania Casimir IV Jagiellon started a war with them over Podlachia in 1444. The Masovian dukes supported Casimir IV Jagiellon' rival for the throne of the Grand Duke of Lithuania, Michael Žygimantaitis (who had married the daughter of Siemowit IV), who had fled from Lithuania in 1444. This war ended in a compromise: Masovia returned Podlachia to the Grand Duchy of Lithuania, and the Grand Duchy of Lithuania paid compensation to Masovia.

== Impact on the Polish economy and demographics ==
The Lithuanian invasions resulted in the depopulation of large areas of the country. In the area of Wiślica, during the time of Casimir the Great, there were 30 people per square kilometer, in Sandomierz – 22, and on the Lublin Upland – an average of one person. This meant that the border of dense population was the Vistula River. Due to the Lithuanian invasions, the eastern territories were more depopulated than the western ones and thus Lithuanians prevented the economic development of these lands.

It is not known exactly how many people were kidnapped during almost two centuries of fighting. Chroniclers of the time mention very large numbers, which are difficult to verify. It is known that the Lithuanian princess Aldona, married to Casimir the Great, received 4,000 freed prisoners as a dowry. It is estimated that on the eve of the Union of Krewo there could have been up to 40,000 Poles in Lithuania. This is a significant percentage, considering that the entire population of Lithuania proper numbered 200,000 people (the remaining 800,000 were Ruthenians from conquered lands).

== Major raids ==
=== 13th century ===
==== 1230s–1250s ====
- 1238 – the invasion of Masovia by Mindaugas and the Prince of Novgorod Iziaslav
- 1246 – Konrad I of Masovia, Mieszko of Opole and hired Lithuanians invaded the Duchy of Sandomierz, where they defeated the troops of Bolesław V the Chaste in the Battle of Zaryszów.
- 1250 – invasion of Lublin
- 1258 – Treniota's invasion at the initiative of Duke Casimir I of Kuyavia, during which the area around Czerwińsk nad Wisłą was devastated and the castle of Orszymowo was captured.

==== 1260s ====
- 1260 – Lithuanian invasion of Płock
- 1262 – the invasion of Treniota and Ruthenians into Masovia - during the invasion the Siege of Jazdów, the beheading of Prince Siemowit I of Masovia by Švarnas, the kidnapping of Konrad II, the attack on Chełmno Land and Pomesania took place.
- 1265 – a Lithuanians and Ruthenians retaliatory invasion of Lesser Poland ruled by Bolesław V the Chaste
- 1266 – the invasion of the Płock Land by Lithuanians and Prussians
- 1269 – invasion of Kuyavia against Siemomysł

==== 1270s–1280s ====
- 1277 – Traidenis' invasion of the Łęczyca Land
- 1282 – joint Yotvingian-Lithuanian invasion of the Lublin region (victory of Leszek the Black in the Battle of the Narew River)
- 1282 – invasion of Sandomierz Land (victory of Leszek the Black in the Battle of Rowiny)
- 1284 – invasion of the Czersk Land
- 1286 – invasion of Masovia and destruction of Sochaczew
- 1287 – invasion of Dobrzyń Land

==== 1290s ====
- 1290 – Jesbuta's (Sesbuta's) invasion of Kuyavia
- 1292 – Vytenis' invasion of Brześć Kujawski
- 1294 – Vytenis' invasion of the Łęczyca Land, where they burned down the Tum Collegiate Church (Battle of Trojanów, death of Casimir II of Łęczyca

=== 14th century ===
==== 1300s ====
- 1302 – invasion of the Sandomierz Land.
- 1305–1306 – invasions of the Sieradz and Kalisz lands

==== 1320s ====
- 1323 – Gediminas' invasion of the Dobrzyń Land at the request of his son-in-law, Prince Wańka of Płock
- 1324 June – Giedymina's invasion takes the Masovian duchy of Trojden I
- 1324 November – on the orders of Gediminas, David of Grodno invades the Masovian duchy of Siemowit II (destruction of Pułtusk)

==== 1330s ====
- 1336 – invasion of Masovia
- 1337 – invasion of Masovia (Masovian victory at the Battle of Pułtusk)

==== 1340–1392: Galicia–Volhynia Wars ====
- 1350 – Battle of Żuków
- 1368 – Lithuanian raid on Masovia (1368)
- 1370 – invasion of the principalities of Vladimir, Belz and Chełm
- 1376 – Lithuanian raid on Lesser Poland

== Invasions in culture ==
- The 19th-century folklorist and ethnographer Oskar Kolberg, in his collection of Polish proverbs and proverbial phrases, mentions the phrase "Lithuanian attack" (Litewska napaść) meaning a treacherous and unexpected attack.
- The Lithuanian invasions are the content of Adam Mickiewicz's ballad Trzech Budrysów (The Three Budrys).

== Bibliography ==
- Jasienica, Paweł (1997). Polska Jagiellonów [Poland of the Jagiellonians] (in Polish). Świat Książki.
- Strzelczyk, Jerzy (2006). Zapomniane narody Europy [The Forgotten Nations of Europe]. Zrozumieć Europę (in Polish). Wrocław: Wydawnictwo Ossolineum. ISBN 978-83-04-04769-3.
- Samsonowicz, Henryk, ed. (2006). Dzieje Mazowsza [The history of Mazovia] (in Polish). Vol. I. Pułtusk.
- Tererycz-Puzio, Agnieszka (2010). "Książęta mazowieccy wobec państwa litewskiego w XIII wieku" [The Dukes of Masovia and the Lithuanian State in the 13th Century] (PDF). Zapiski Historyczne (in Polish). LXXV.
- Błaszczyk, G. (1998). Dzieje stosunków polsko-litewskich od czasów najdawniejszych do współczesności [The history of Polish-Lithuanian relations from the earliest times to the present day] (in Polish). Vol. I: Trudne początki [Difficult beginnings]. Poznań.
- Gudavičius, Edvardas; Matulevičius, Algirdas (2018). "Lietuvos–Mazovijos karai". vle.lt (in Lithuanian).
