= Inka Dowlasz =

Polish screenwriter

Inka Dowlasz (born 25 May 1949) is a Polish theater director, playwright, screenwriter, psychologist and teacher. Dowlasz's theatrical performances were given in theatres in Poland and abroad. From 1972 to 1982 she cooperated with Jerzy Grotowski's "Teatr Laboratorium" on "Theatre of Sources", "University of Nations Theaters“ and "Tree of People", "Initiative – Mountain".

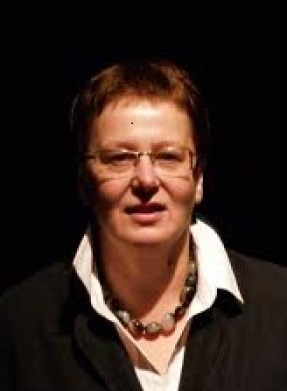
Inka Dowlasz

== Life and career ==
Dowlasz was born and brought up in Szczecin, Poland, the daughter of Weronika and Grzegorz Dowlasz, widely regarded as the first founders of home for orphanages in Poland. Dowlasz's father was a writer and Armia Krajowa ( Home Army) soldier.

In 1968 Dowlasz began to study psychology at Jagiellonian University and at Ludwik Solski Academy for the Dramatic Arts, finishing with a PhD degree. During her studies she worked on techniques for building a role.

Since 1990 she permanently connected with the Ludowy Theatre in Kraków. She performed with the Contact Theater in Manchester, in Teatr Polski and Teatr Współczesny in Szczecin, Teatr im. Siemaszkowej in Rzeszów, Teatr im. Jaracza in Łodz and Stary Teatr im. Modrzejewskiej in Kraków, (In this the Crucible by Arthur Millera and The Woman in the Dunes by Kōbō Abe). In 1998 Dowlasz founded Improwizacjon Studio and in 2000 she founded Therapy by Art Studio.

Dowlasz is a member of the board of directors of the "Association of Innovation in Science and Culture" and "Union of Artists of the Polish Scene in Warsaw" and is also a member of "Association Unicorn".

== Awards ==
- 2003 – Polcul Foundation Award for artistic, therapeutic and educational activities at the Teatr Ludowy in Kraków.
- 2003 – Award on the First National Festival of Polish Contemporary Art for Children and Youth "Contexts" for spectacle "Odlot".
- 2012 – laureate of Forbes professionals 2012 – Public Trust Professions.

== Major productions and writing ==
- 1979 – Don Juan Moliera – director assistant Bohdana Cybulskiego (Teatr Polski in Szczecin),
- 1984 – Czarownice z Salem Arthura Millera – director (Teatr Współczesny in Szczecin),
- 1986 – Dom na niebiosach Jiřego Hubača –director (Teatr im. Wandy Siemaszkowej in Rzeszowi),
- 1987 – Solo na dwa głosy Toma Kempinskiego – direktor (Teatr im. Stefana Jaracza in Łodź),
- 1992 – Kobieta z wydm Kōbō Abe – adapted and directed (Stary Teatr im. Heleny Modrzejewskiej in Kraków),
- 1996 – Toksyczni rodzice – scenario and director (Teatr Ludowy w Krakowie),
- 1998 – Bici biją – scenario and director (Teatr Ludowy in Kraków),
- 1998 – Muzyka Ainurów – concert director, based on the novel Johna Ronalda Reuela Tolkiena (PWST in Kraków),
- 1999 – Tajemnica Bożego Narodzenia Josteina Gaardera – – scenario and director (Teatr Ludowy w Krakowie),
- 1999 – Wędrowcom wschodu – concert director, based on the novel Podróży na wschód Hermanna Hessego (PWST in Kraków),
- 2000 – Czuwajcie ze mną – ostatni koncert Adriana Lewerkuhna – koncert director Thomasa Manna (PWST in Kraków),
- 2001 – Odlot – scenario and director (Teatr Ludowy in Kraków),
- 2002 – Toksyczni Krzysztofa Bizia – Director and scenography (Teatr Powszechny im. Jana Kochanowskiego in Radom),
- 2003 – Sytuacja bez wyjścia – scenario and director (Teatr Ludowy in Kraków),
- 2006 – Wakacje w Holandii – scenario and director (Teatr Ludowy in Kraków),
- 2006 – Idź się leczyć – scenario and director (Teatr Śląski in Katowice),
- 2007 – Sekrety Baronowej – scenario and director
- 2009 – Pierwsza godzina wiekom Jagiellońskim dzwoni –cooperation with Danuta Michałowskąa (PWST in Kraków),
- 2009 – Demokracja Edwarda Gordona Craiga –director (Fabryka Trzciny in Warszawa),
- 2011 – Elizabeth Watson – cichociemna –, scenario and director
- 2012 – Pułapki miłości – scenario and director (Polski Teatr w Wilnie)

== Works ==
- Inka Dowlasz – Studio Improwizacji to ja (pol.). Serwis Teatralny „Teatr dla Was". [dostęp 2013-05-16].
- Inka Dowlasz – Studio Improwizacji to ja (pol.). Serwis Teatralny „Teatr dla Was". [dostęp 2013-05-16].
- Halina Pytel – Kapanowska. Setka dzieci państwa Dowlaszów. „Przegląd". 29/2002 (pol.)
