= Karl Loeillot =

French painter

Henri Charles Loeillot or Loeillot-Hartwig (1798–1864), usually known as Karl Loeillot, was a French painter and lithographer.

== Life ==
Loeillot was born in Stettin, Germany, and died in Paris, France.

== Work ==
The signature of Loeillot-Hartwig, K or Karl Loeillot is found on lithographs, which often depict studies of horses, made by other artists, such as Horace Vernet. His name is also found on a series of 16 lithographs under the general title: Recueil de sujets Grecs (Collection of Greeks topics), which Loeillot created in 1824 on behalf of Choisy faience factory. These illustrations were inspired by the Greek Revolution of 1821 and used to decorate faience objects, such as crockery and mainly dishware sets.

These lithographs were used predominately by Choisy factory for the decoration of 12-piece dishware sets, whereas the factories in Montereau and Toulouse selected only some of them and completed the rest of their sets using themes inspired by the work of other artists, such as Hippolyte Bellangé and Henri Decaisne. The variety of these sets is great, since the frames of the dishes were decorated with different variation of ornaments each time.

The themes of Loeillot's philhellenic series are the following: Le serment du Grec, Le départ du Grec, Débarquement de troupes Grècques, La veille d' une attaque, Troupes Grecques en embuscade, Jeune Grecque combattant un Pacha, Soldat Grec enlevant un étendart à son ennemie, Vengeance d' une famille grecque, Prise d' un navire Turc par les Grecs, Des Grecs prenant un fort défendu par des Turcs, Un Grec blessé, Mort d' un Grec, Jeune Grecque sauvée de l' esclavage des Turcs, Pacha fait prisonnier, Entrée triomphale des liberateurs de la Grèce and Un Helléne, au tombeau de son ami, mort pour la liberté de la Grèce.

Loeillot's illustrations were also used to decorate vases, tea sets, stamped fabrics and wooden cases.

== Bibliography ==
- E. Bénézit, Dictionnaire critique et documentaire des peintres, sculpteurs, dessinateurs et graveurs de tous les temps et de tous les pays; par un groupe d’ecrivains specialistes français et étrangers. Nouvelle édition entièrement refondue, revue et corrigée sous la direction des héritiers de E. Bénézit avec reproductions hors-texte en heliogravure. Librairie Gründ, 1956–1962, vol. 5, p. 611.
- Α. Amandry, Η Ελληνική Επανάσταση σε γαλλικά κεραμικά του 19ου αιώνα, Πελοποννησιακό Λαογραφικό Ίδρυμα, Ναύπλιο, 1982.
- Α. Amandry, «Φιλελληνική παράσταση σε γαλλικό βάζο», Δελτίον της Ιστορικής και Εθνολογικής Εταιρείας 23 (1980), p. 335-339.
- Α. Amandry, «Φιλελληνικά ενθύμια του Εθνικού Ιστορικού Μουσείου», Δελτίον της Ιστορικής και Εθνολογικής Εταιρείας 29 (1986), p. 257-267.
- El. Pitari-Magioletti [Ελ. Πιτάρη-Μαγιολέττι], «Θέματα του Εικοσιένα σε γαλλικές πορσελάνες», Ζυγός 21 (1976), p. 7-9
- National Art Gallery and Alexander Soutzos Museum [Εθνική Πινακοθήκη-Μουσείο Αλεξάνδρου Σούτζου] (εκδ.), Η Ελληνική Επανάσταση. Ο Ντελακρουά και οι Γάλλοι ζωγράφοι. 1815–1848, Κατάλογος έκθεσης, Αθήνα, 1997, p. 258-265, 284–287.
- Exhibition Catalogue: Χρέος τιμής στο Εικοσιένα. Αφιέρωμα για τα 180 χρόνια μνήμης. 1821–2001. Έκθεση κειμηλίων από τη συλλογή Νικήτα και Ευαγγελίας Σταυρινάκη, Κατάλογος έκθεσης, Αθήνα, 2001.
- N. Kastriti [Ν. Καστρίτη], Η Ελλάδα του ΄21 με τη ματιά των Φιλελλήνων. Γαλλική φιλελληνική παραγωγή από τις συλλογές του Εθνικού Ιστορικού Μουσείου, Ιστορική και Εθνολογική Εταιρεία της Ελλάδος, Αθήνα, 2006, p. 111-138.
- P. Panariti [Π. Παναρίτη], «Δύο σπάνια κεραμικά σκεύη με φιλελληνικές παραστάσεις», στο Τεκμήρια Ιστορίας. Μονογραφίες, Εθνικό Ιστορικό Μουσείο-Ιστορική και Εθνολογική Εταιρεία της Ελλάδος, Αθήνα, 2009.
- P. Panariti [Π. Παναρίτη], «Η συλλογή φιλελληνικών κεραμικών του Εθνικού Ιστορικού Μουσείου. Απηχήσεις από φιλελληνικές παραστάσεις σε χαρακτικά», στο Τεκμήρια Ιστορίας. Μονογραφίες. Τεύχος Α’, Εθνικό Ιστορικό Μουσείο-Ιστορική και Εθνολογική Εταιρεία της Ελλάδος, Αθήνα, 2010.
