= Lithuanian football standings (1941–1950) =

The Lithuanian football standings from 1941–1950 are listed below.

== 1941 ==
Note: Season incomplete due to World War II and the first Soviet invasion of Lithuania.

Team Standings	GP	W	D	L	F	A	GD	P
Spartakas Kaunas	5	5	0	0	30	3	27	10
Spartakas Vilnius	4	3	0	1	8	9	-1	6
Dinamo Kaunas	2	2	0	0	5	1	4	4
Spartuolis Vilnius	4	2	0	2	11	7	4	4
Spartuolis Kaunas	4	2	0	2	9	8	1	4
Dinamo Vilnius	3	1	0	2	4	12	-8	2
Spartuolis Kaunas II	4	0	0	4	3	10	-7	0
Spartakas Siauliai	4	0	0	4	4	24	-20	0

== 1942 ==
Kaunas Group
Team Standings	GP	W	D	L	F	A	GD	P
LFLS Kaunas	4	3	1	0	12	3	9	7
Tauras Kaunas	4	3	0	1	11	7	4	6
Perkunas Kaunas	4	2	0	2	11	12	-1	4
LGSF Kaunas	4	1	1	2	9	9	0	3
Kovas Kaunas	4	0	0	4	9	21	-12	0

=== Promotion ===
LFLS Vilnius – Sarunas Vilnius (2:2) (3:1)

Siauliai Group
Team Standings	GP	W	D	L	F	A	GD	P
Gubernija Siauliai	3	3	0	0	20	3	17	6
Zaibas Joniskis	3	2	0	1	10	13	-3	4
Zaibas Kursenai	3	1	0	2	4	9	-5	2
Batas Siauliai	3	0	0	3	1	10	-9	0

Panevezys Group
Team Standings	GP	W	D	L	F	A	GD	P
MSK Panevezys	2	2	0	0	11	1	10	4
Vilkas Birzai	2	1	0	1	4	8	-4	2
Grandis Rokiskis	2	0	0	2	0	6	-6	0

=== Sudua Group ===
Sveikata Kybartai – Suduva Marijampole (6:0)

=== Ukmerge Group ===
Perkunas Ukmerge

=== Zemaitija Group ===
Dziugas Telsiai – Babrungas Plungė (2:1)

=== Quarterfinal ===
- Gubernija Siauliai – Dziugas Telsiai (8:2)
- MSK Panevezys – Perkunas Ukmerge (5:2)
- LFLS Kaunas – Sveikata Kybartai (5:1)

=== Semifinal ===
- MSK Panevezys – Gubernija Siauliai (5:1)
- LFLS Kaunas – LFLS Vilnius (3:1)

=== Final ===
LFLS Kaunas – MSK Panevezys (2:0)

== 1942/43 ==
Kaunas Group
Team Standings	GP	W	D	L	F	A	GD	P
Tauras Kaunas	8	5	2	1	24	10	14	12
Perkunas Kaunas	8	3	4	1	29	18	11	10
Kovas Kaunas	8	3	2	3	14	21	-7	8
LGSF Kaunas	8	3	0	5	16	24	-8	6
LFLS Kaunas	8	1	2	5	11	21	-10	4

Vilnius Group
Team Standings	GP	W	D	L	F	A	GD	P
LGSF Vilnius	4	4	0	0	12	1	11	8
LFLS Vilnius	4	1	0	3	11	11	0	2
Sarunas Vilnius	4	1	0	3	7	18	-11	2

Siauliai Group
Team Standings	GP	W	D	L	F	A	GD	P
Guberlija Siauliai	11	10	0	1	46	14	32	20
Sakalas Siauliai	11	7	2	2	31	18	13	16
Wermachtfeld	11	5	3	3	22	22	0	13
Zaibas Kursenai	11	5	0	6	34	23	11	10
Zaibas Joniskis	7	4	1	2	24	12	12	9
Sarunas Siauliai	11	2	1	8	15	31	-16	5
Metalas Siauliai	6	0	1	5	3	36	-33	1
Tauras Taurage	6	0	0	6	6	25	-19	0

Panevezys Group
Team Standings	GP	W	D	L	F	A	GD	P
MSK Panevezys	7	7	0	0	57	2	55	14
LGSF Panevezys	4	3	0	1	9	8	1	6
Grandis Rokiskis	7	2	0	5	12	25	-13	4
Vilkas Birzai	7	2	0	5	6	22	-16	4
Sakalas Obeliai	7	2	0	5	11	38	-27	4

=== Suduva Group ===
Sveikata Kybartai – Dainava Alytus (3:0)

=== Jonava Group ===
LFLS Jonava

=== Zemaitija Group ===
Dziugas Telsiai

=== Quarterfinal ===
- Gubernija Siauliai – Dziugas Telsiai (3:0)
- LGSF Vilnius – LFLS Jonava (3:1)
- Tauras Kaunas – Sveikata Kybartai (5:0)

=== Semifinal ===
- MSK Panevezys – LGSF Vilnius (2:1)
- Tauras Kaunas – Gubernija Siauliai (5:1)

=== Final ===
Tauras Kaunas – MSK Panevezys (4:1)

== 1943/44 ==
Note: Season incomplete due to the second Soviet invasion.

Team Standings	GP	W	D	L	F	A	GD	P
Tauras Kaunas	14	10	2	2	41	19	22	22
Perkunas Kaunas	15	10	2	3	42	16	26	22
Gubernija Siauliai	15	10	2	3	46	30	16	22
LGSF Vilnius	14	7	0	7	30	36	-6	14
LGSF Kaunas	15	6	1	8	45	33	12	13
Kovas Kaunas	15	5	2	8	27	43	-16	12
MSK Panevezys	15	4	3	8	26	43	-17	11
Sarunas Vilnius	14	3	3	8	21	41	-20	9
LFLS Kaunas	15	2	3	10	22	39	-17	7

== 1945 ==
Between 1945 and 1989, the best teams played in USSR Championships: Zalgiris (Spartakas) Vilnius, Atlantas Klaipėda, and Inkaras Kaunas (some years).

Kaunas Group
Team Standings	GP	W	D	L	F	A	GD	P
Dinamo Kaunas	3	3	0	0	11	2	9	6
Spartakas Kaunas	3	2	0	1	24	6	18	4
Kovas Kaunas	3	1	0	2	6	11	-5	2
Zalgiris Kaunas	3	0	0	3	1	23	-22	0

Vilnius Group
Team Standings	GP	W	D	L	F	A	GD	P
Dinamo Vilnius	2	2	0	0	12	1	11	4
Spartakas Vilnius	2	1	0	1	4	3	1	2
KN Vilnius	2	0	0	2	1	13	-12	0

=== Siauliai Group ===
Spartakas Siauliai – Zalgiris Siauliai (8:4)

=== Suduva Group ===
Zalgiris Marijampole – Sveikata Kybartai (3:3) (8:0)

=== Quarterfinal ===
- Sodyba Klaipeda – Tauras Taurage (1:0)
- Spartakas Kaunas – Zalgiris Marijampole (8:2)
- Spartakas Siauliai – Dziugas Telsiai (12:1)
- Dinamo Vilnius – MSK Panevezys (15:0)

=== Semifinal ===
- Spartakas Kaunas – Sodyba Klaipeda (3:1)
- Dinamo Vilnius – Spartakas Siauliai (6:0)

=== Final ===
Spartakas Kaunas – Dinamo Vilnius (4:0)

== 1946 ==
Team Standings	GP	W	D	L	F	A	GD	P
Dinamo Kaunas	7	6	1	0	32	11	21	13
Spartakas Kaunas	7	5	0	2	27	11	16	10
Lokomotyvas Panevezys	7	3	3	1	12	14	-2	9
Spartakas Siauliai	7	4	0	3	33	28	5	8
Lokomotyvas Kaunas	7	3	1	3	20	15	5	7
Žalgiris Vilnius	7	1	2	4	9	21	-12	4
Audra Klaipeda	7	2	0	5	12	30	-18	4
Dinamo Vilnius	7	0	1	6	15	30	-15	1

=== Promotion ===
- Veliava Siauliai
- Zalgiris Marijampole

== 1947 ==
Team Standings	GP	W	D	L	F	A	GD	P
Lokomotyvas Kaunas	17	14	0	3	51	23	28	28
Spartakas Siauliai	17	11	1	5	58	30	28	23
Zalgiris Klaipeda	17	10	3	4	33	29	4	23
Spartakas Kaunas	17	10	2	5	55	39	16	22
Dinamo Kaunas	17	7	3	7	43	31	12	17
Veliava Siauliai	17	7	1	9	51	43	8	15
Zalgiris Marijampole	17	6	3	8	33	38	-5	15
Zalgiris Panevezys	17	7	1	9	21	33	-12	15
Dinamo Vilnius	17	2	0	15	11	49	-38	4
Zalgiris Vilnius	9	0	0	9	3	44	-41	0

=== Promotion ===
- Zalgiris Siauliai
- Zalgiris Kaunas

=== Cup ===
==== Semifinal ====
- Lokomotyvas Kaunas – Zalgiris Ukmerge (6:2)
- Veliava Siauliai – Audra Klaipeda (3:2)

==== Final ====
Lokomotyvas Kaunas – Veliava Siauliai (3:2)

== 1948 ==
North
Team Standings	GP	W	D	L	F	A	GD	P
Audra Klaipeda	8	6	0	2	28	13	15	12
Zalgiris Siauliai	8	5	1	2	17	13	4	11
Zalgiris Taurage	8	5	0	3	28	17	11	10
ASK Kaunas	8	4	1	3	22	21	1	9
Veliava Siauliai	8	4	0	4	24	11	13	8
Spartakas Plunge	8	3	1	4	18	26	-8	7
Zalgiris Panevezys	8	3	1	4	9	15	-6	7
Spartakas Siauliai	8	3	0	5	16	24	-8	6
GSK Klaipeda	8	1	0	7	15	37	-22	2

South
Team Standings	GP	W	D	L	F	A	GD	P
Spartakas Vilnius	9	7	0	2	28	14	14	14
Elnias Siauliai	9	6	1	2	28	13	15	13
Dinamo Vilnius	9	5	1	3	22	13	9	11
Kauno audiniai	9	5	1	3	24	15	9	11
Spartakas Kaunas	9	3	3	3	15	18	-3	9
Inkaras Kaunas	9	4	1	4	16	22	-6	9
KKI Kaunas	9	4	1	4	10	16	-6	9
Lokomotyvas Kaunas	9	1	3	5	11	22	-11	5
Zalgiris Ukmerge	9	1	3	5	11	25	-14	5
Zalgiris Marijampole	9	1	2	6	15	22	-7	4

Final Group I
Team Standings	GP	W	D	L	F	A	GD	P
Elnias Siauliai	5	4	0	1	22	11	11	8
Zalgiris Taurage	5	3	1	1	14	10	4	7
Spartakas Vilnius	5	2	1	2	15	11	4	5
Dinamo Vilnius	5	1	3	1	10	10	0	5
Audra Klaipeda	5	1	1	3	5	7	-2	3
Zalgiris Siauliai	5	0	2	3	7	24	17	2

Final Group II
Team Standings	GP	W	D	L	F	A	GD	P
Inkaras Kaunas	5	5	0	0	21	11	10	10
Kauno audiniai	5	4	0	1	9	3	6	8
Spartakas Plunge	5	3	0	2	10	8	2	6
Spartakas Kaunas	5	2	0	3	3	9	-6	4
Veliava Siauliai	5	1	0	4	7	13	-6	2
ASK Kaunas	5	0	0	5	5	11	-6	0

Final Group III
Team Standings	GP	W	D	L	F	A	GD	P
Lokomotyvas Kaunas	6	5	0	1	11	1	10	10
Zalgiris Ukmerge	6	5	0	1	8	9	-1	10
Spartakas Siauliai	6	3	1	2	0	0	0	7
Zalgiris Marijampole	6	3	1	2	2	5	-3	7
GSK Klaipeda	6	2	0	4	3	9	-6	4
KKI Kaunas	6	1	0	5	0	0	0	2
Zalgiris Panevezys	6	1	0	5	0	0	0	2

=== Promotion ===
- Sveikata Kybartai
- Dinamo Utena
- Spartakas Joniskis

=== Cup ===
==== Semifinal ====
- Inkaras Kaunas – Elnias Siauliai (4:0)
- Lokomotyvas Kaunas – ASK Kaunas (2:1)

==== Final ====
Inkaras Kaunas – Lokomotyvas Kaunas (4:0)

== 1949 ==
Team Standings	GP	W	D	L	F	A	GD	P
Elnias Siauliai	14	12	0	2	59	19	40	24
Inkaras Kaunas	14	12	0	2	78	9	69	24
Veliava Siauliai	14	11	1	2	40	24	16	23
Kauno audiniai	14	10	1	3	53	28	25	21
Audra Klaipeda	14	10	1	3	40	15	25	21
ASK Kaunas	14	7	0	7	43	36	7	14
Zalgiris Marijampole	14	6	1	7	16	23	-7	13
Spartakas Plunge	14	6	1	7	22	45	-23	13
Spartakas Vilnius	14	5	2	7	30	37	-7	12
Dinamo Vilnius	14	6	0	8	26	39	-13	12
Zalgiris Kybartai	14	6	0	8	27	41	-14	12
Spartakas Kaunas	14	3	2	9	18	36	-18	8
Zalgiris Taurage	14	3	0	11	28	67	-39	6
Zalgiris Ukmerge	14	2	1	11	14	45	-31	5
Panevezys	14	1	0	13	17	47	-30	2

=== Final ===
Elnias Siauliai – Inkaras Kaunas (1:0)

==== Promotion ====
FSK Kaunas

=== Cup ===
==== Semifinal ====
- Inkaras Kaunas – Elnias Siauliai (5:2)
- Kauno audiniai – FSK Kaunas (4:3)

==== Final ====
Inkaras Kaunas – Kauno audiniai (1:0)

== 1950 ==
Group I
Team Standings	GP	W	D	L	F	A	GD	P
Zalgiris Kybartai	7	6	1	0	36	12	24	13
Elnias Siauliai	7	6	0	1	29	5	24	12
Kauno audiniai	7	4	0	3	26	18	8	8
Zalgiris Panevezys	7	3	2	2	15	16	-1	8
Spartakas Vilnius	7	3	0	4	16	16	0	6
Zalgiris Ukmerge	7	2	1	4	10	27	-17	5
Cukraus fab. Marijampole	7	1	2	4	13	16	-3	4
Zalgiris Taurage	7	0	0	7	8	43	-35	0

Group II
Team Standings	GP	W	D	L	F	A	GD	P
Inkaras Kaunas	7	7	0	0	35	3	32	14
FSK Kaunas	7	4	1	2	11	12	-1	9
Audra Klaipeda	7	4	0	3	21	13	8	8
Dinamo Utena	7	4	0	3	16	12	4	8
Dinamo Vilnius	7	2	2	3	12	18	-5	6
ASK Kaunas	7	2	0	5	12	17	-5	4
Spartakas Plunge	7	1	2	4	12	20	-8	4
Spartakas Kaunas	7	1	1	5	4	29	-25	3

Final Group 1
Team Standings	GP	W	D	L	F	A	GD	P
Inkaras Kaunas	14	13	0	1	61	10	51	26
Elnias Siauliai	14	12	0	2	58	10	48	24
Audra Klaipeda	14	7	0	7	24	41	-17	14
FSK Kaunas	14	5	2	7	37	48	-11	12
Zalgiris Kybartai	14	6	0	8	21	48	-27	12
Dinamo Utena	14	5	0	9	28	28	0	10
Kauno audiniai	14	4	2	8	30	40	-10	10
Zalgiris Panevezys	14	1	2	11	21	55	-34	4

Final Group 2
Team Standings	GP	W	D	L	F	A	GD	P
Dinamo Vilnius	7	7	0	0	21	3	18	14
ASK Kaunas	7	3	3	1	22	11	11	9
Zalgiris Ukmerge	7	4	1	2	15	12	3	9
Spartakas Vilnius	7	4	1	2	7	11	-4	9
Cukraus fab. Marijampole	7	3	1	3	9	9	0	7
Spartakas Plunge	7	1	1	5	9	17	-8	3
Spartakas Kaunas	7	1	1	5	5	15	-10	3
Zalgiris Taurage	7	1	0	6	2	12	-10	2

=== Promotion ===
- Saliutas Vilnius
- Lituanika Kaunas

=== Cup ===
==== Semifinal ====
- Inkaras Kaunas – Dinamo Utena (2:0)
- Elnias Siauliai – Spartakas Plunge (3:0)

==== Final ====
Elnias Siauliai – Inkaras Kaunas (4:0)

== See also ==
- Lithuanian football standings (1931–1940)
- Lithuanian football standings (1951–1960)
- Lithuanian football standings (1961–1970)
- Lithuanian football standings (1971–1980)
- Lithuanian football standings (1981–1990)

== Sources ==
- RSSF/Almantas Lahzadis
