= Lithuanian football standings (1951–1960) =

The Lithuanian football standings from 1951–1960 are listed below.

== 1951 ==
Class A
Team Standings	GP	W	D	L	F	A	GD	P
Inkaras Kaunas	21	19	1	1	90	13	77	39
Elnias Siauliai	21	13	3	5	51	20	31	29
Kauno audinai	21	13	2	6	55	29	26	28
Lituanika Kaunas	21	12	3	6	61	35	26	27
Dinamo Vilnius	21	10	2	9	68	33	35	22
Audra Klaipeda	21	10	1	10	36	34	2	21
ASK Kaunas	21	8	5	8	32	36	-4	21
Saliutas Vilnius	11	6	4	1	36	17	19	16
Zalgiris Panevezys	21	4	5	12	28	64	-36	13
Zalgiris Kybartai	21	4	3	14	30	59	-29	11
Dinamo Utena	21	3	2	16	22	94	-72	8
Zalgiris Ukmerge	21	3	1	17	20	95	-75	7

=== Promotion ===
- Gubernija Siauliai
- Lima Kaunas

=== Cup ===
==== Semifinal ====
- Inkaras Kaunas – Dinamo Utena (3:0)
- Elnias Siauliai – Lima Kaunas (3:0)

==== Final ====
Inkaras Kaunas – Elnias Siauliai (2:0)

== 1952 ==
Class A
Team Standings	GP	W	D	L	F	A	GD	P
KN Vilnius	22	15	5	2	54	14	40	35
Inkaras Kaunas	22	16	1	5	66	27	39	33
Elnias Siauliai	22	13	3	6	50	26	24	29
Lima Kaunas	22	12	3	7	48	27	21	27
Lituanika Kaunas	22	10	6	6	35	40	-5	26
Dinamo Vilnius	22	8	7	7	31	20	11	23
Kauno audinai	22	8	5	9	32	33	-1	21
Gubernija Siauliai	22	7	6	9	28	50	-22	20
KPI Kaunas	22	8	3	11	21	34	-13	19
Triniciai Klaipeda	22	4	8	10	34	36	-2	16
Zalgiris Panevezys	22	3	3	16	29	65	-36	9
GSK Kybartai	22	1	4	17	21	77	-56	6

=== Promotion ===
- JJPF Kaunas
- Spartakas Plunge

=== Cup ===
==== Semifinal ====
- KN Vilnius – Eidukeviciaus fab. Vilnius (3:0)
- Dinamo Vilnius – Kauno audiniai (2:1)

==== Final ====
KN Vilnius – Dinamo Vilnius (1:0)

== 1953 ==
Class A
Team Standings	GP	W	D	L	F	A	GD	P
Elnias Siauliai	21	15	4	2	45	20	25	34
Inkaras Kaunas	21	14	4	3	58	15	43	32
Lima Kaunas	21	12	3	6	41	26	15	27
KPI Kaunas	21	9	6	6	32	25	7	24
JJPF Kaunas	21	9	4	8	24	30	-6	22
Lituanika Kaunas	21	8	4	9	40	43	-3	20
Dinamo Vilnius	21	8	3	10	26	33	-7	19
Triniciai Klaipeda	21	8	2	11	34	47	-13	18
Spartakas Plunge	21	6	4	11	27	38	-11	16
Gubernija Siauliai	21	5	3	13	14	33	-19	13
Elfa Vilnius	11	5	2	4	16	13	3	12
Kauno audinai	21	2	1	18	11	45	-34	5

=== Promotion ===
- KN Vilnius (GP – 11, W – 5, D – 2, L – 4, F – 24, A – 8, GD – 16, P – 12)
- Raud. Spalis Kaunas

=== Cup ===
==== Semifinal ====
- Lima Kaunas – Elnias Siauliai (3:2)
- Triniciai Klaipeda – Spartakas Plunge (1:0)

==== Final ====
Lima Kaunas – Triniciai Klaipeda (4:2)

== 1954 ==
Class A
Team Standings	GP	W	D	L	F	A	GD	P
Inkaras Kaunas	19	17	1	1	44	18	26	35
Lima Kaunas	19	12	1	6	27	26	1	25
Elnias Siauliai	19	11	1	7	57	28	29	23
Raud. Spalis Kaunas	19	10	3	7	35	33	2	23
KPI Kaunas	19	8	6	5	32	26	6	22
Spartakas Vilnius	19	7	4	8	39	32	7	18
JJPF Kaunas	19	5	4	10	28	38	-10	14
Trinyciai Klaipeda	19	5	2	12	26	41	-15	12
Elfa Vilnius	19	4	4	11	24	46	-22	12
Karin. Namai Vilnius	11	4	3	4	13	11	2	11
Gubernija Siauliai	19	2	3	14	18	44	-26	7
Dinamo Vilnius*								

(*Note: data missing for Dinamo Vilnius.)

=== Promotion ===
MSK Panevezys

=== Cup ===
==== Semifinal ====
- Inkaras Kaunas – Lima Kaunas (2:1)
- KPI Kaunas – KN Vilnius (2:0)

==== Final ====
Inkaras Kaunas – KPI Kaunas (4:0)

== 1955 ==
Class A
Team Standings	GP	W	D	L	F	A	GD	P
Lima Kaunas	20	11	7	2	38	16	22	29
Raud. Spalis Kaunas	20	14	1	5	49	23	26	29
Elfa Vilnius	20	12	4	4	35	26	9	28
Inkaras Kaunas	20	9	6	5	39	31	8	24
KPI Kaunas	20	10	4	6	33	30	3	24
Spartakas Vilnius	20	11	1	8	50	38	12	23
MSK Panevezys	20	8	4	8	44	38	6	20
Elnias Siauliai	20	5	5	10	34	44	-10	15
Trinyciai Klaipeda	20	5	3	12	29	25	4	13
Gubernija Siauliai	20	4	2	14	20	62	-42	10
JJPF Kaunas	20	2	1	17	18	56	-38	5

=== Final ===
Lima Kaunas – Raud. Spalis Kaunas (3:0)

=== Promotion ===
- Linu audiniai Plunge
- Raud. zvaigzde Vilnius

=== Cup ===
==== Semifinal ====
- Linu audiniai Plunge – Inkaras Kaunas (3:1)
- KPI Kaunas – MSK Panevezys (3:1)

==== Final ====
KPI Kaunas – Linu audiniai Plunge (2:0)

== 1956 ==
Class A
Team Standings	GP	W	D	L	F	A	GD	P
Linu audiniai Plunge	22	16	4	2	42	13	29	36
Elnias Siauliai	22	15	3	4	71	22	49	33
MSK Panevezys	22	15	0	7	54	47	7	30
KPI Kaunas	22	13	2	7	42	38	4	28
Spartakas Vilnius	22	11	5	6	53	34	19	27
Inkaras Kaunas	22	8	8	6	38	28	10	24
Raud. Spalis Kaunas	22	8	5	9	52	44	8	21
Elfa Vilnius	22	9	2	11	44	32	12	20
Lima Kaunas	22	7	3	12	40	39	1	17
Raud. zvaigzde Vilnius	22	7	3	12	27	41	-14	17
Svyturys Klaipeda	22	3	3	16	23	76	-53	9
Gubernija Siauliai	22	0	2	20	8	80	-72	2

=== Promotion ===
Nemunas Vilkaviskis

=== Cup ===
==== Semifinal ====
- Raud. Zvaigzde Vilnius – Elfa Vilnius (3:1)
- Raud. Spalis Kaunas – KPI Kaunas (1:1) (4:0)

==== Final ====
Raud. Spalis Kaunas – Raud. Zvaigzde Vilnius (3:0)

== 1957 ==
Class A
Team Standings	GP	W	D	L	F	A	GD	P
Elnias Siauliai	26	20	5	1	73	11	62	45
Inkaras Kaunas	26	18	5	3	59	26	33	41
Linu audiniai Plunge	26	13	8	5	37	30	7	34
Elfa Vilnius	26	14	4	8	59	25	34	32
MSK Panevezys	26	11	8	7	60	48	12	30
Spartakas Vilnius	26	13	4	9	52	41	11	30
Raud. Spalis Kaunas	26	14	1	11	62	45	17	29
Lima Kaunas	26	11	6	9	40	33	7	28
KPI Kaunas	26	12	3	11	37	37	0	27
Raud. zvaigzde Vilnius	26	8	5	13	27	32	-5	21
Spartakas Kaunas	26	5	3	18	15	55	-40	13
Svyturys Klaipeda	26	5	2	19	28	67	-39	12
RPK Vilkaviskis	26	3	6	17	24	60	-36	12
Spartakas Vilnius (Youth)	26	4	2	20	25	88	-63	10

=== Promotion ===
Cukraus fab. Kapsukas

=== Cup ===
==== Semifinal ====
- Elnias Siauliai – Inkaras Kaunas (1:0)
- MSK Panevezys – Maistas Taurage (1:0)

==== Final ====
Elnias Siauliai – MSK Panevezys (2:0)

== 1958 ==
Class A
Team Standings	GP	W	D	L	F	A	GD	P
Elnias Siauliai	11	8	1	2	22	11	11	17
Raud. zvaigzde Vilnius	11	6	4	1	18	7	11	16
Spartakas Vilnius	11	7	2	2	25	18	7	16
Inkaras Kaunas	11	4	4	3	19	9	10	12
MSK Panevezys	11	5	2	4	21	18	3	12
Raud. Spalis Kaunas	11	6	0	5	22	20	2	12
Linu audiniai Plunge	11	4	3	4	12	15	-3	11
KPI Kaunas	11	3	4	4	20	10	10	10
Baltija Klaipeda	11	4	1	6	16	25	-9	9
Lima Kaunas	11	2	4	5	7	19	-12	8
Cukras fab. Kapsukas	11	3	1	7	14	26	-12	7
Elfa Vilnius	11	0	2	9	6	24	-18	2

=== Promotion ===
- KKI Kaunas
- Melioratorius Kretinga

=== Cup ===
==== Semifinal ====
- Spartakas Vilnius – Elnias Siauliai (4:0)
- Melioratorius Kretinga – Cukraus fab. Kapsukas (4:?)

==== Final ====
Spartakas Vilnius – Melioratorius Kretinga (5:3)

== 1958/59 ==
Class A
Team Standings	GP	W	D	L	F	A	GD	P
Raud. zvaigzde Vilnius	22	14	8	0	26	11	15	36
KKI Kaunas	22	11	8	3	40	20	20	30
Elnias Siauliai	22	10	7	5	30	22	8	27
Linu audiniai Plunge	22	10	4	8	22	29	-7	24
MSK Panevezys	22	9	5	8	40	30	10	23
Spartakas Vilnius	22	7	8	7	24	22	2	22
Inkaras Kaunas	22	9	2	11	44	33	11	20
Melioratorius Kretinga	22	6	6	10	25	32	-7	18
Lima Kaunas	22	5	8	9	22	33	-11	18
LRI Klaipeda	22	6	6	10	18	39	-21	18
Raud. Spalis Kaunas	22	6	5	11	33	43	-10	17
KPI Kaunas	22	4	7	11	20	30	-10	15

=== Promotion ===
- Statybininkas Siauliai
- Cukraus fab. Kapsukas

=== Cup ===
==== Semifinal ====
- Elnias Siauliai – Spartakas Vilnius (1:0)
- KKI Kaunas – LRI Klaipeda (3:0)

==== Final ====
Elnias Siauliai – KKI Kaunas (2:0)

== 1959/60 ==
Class A
Team Standings	GP	W	D	L	F	A	GD	P
Elnias Siauliai	22	14	2	6	52	29	23	30
Raud. zvaigzde Vilnius	22	11	8	3	40	19	21	30
Linu audiniai Plunge	22	12	5	5	30	23	7	29
Inkaras Kaunas	22	11	4	7	36	22	14	26
Spartakas Vilnius	22	12	0	10	54	40	14	24
Melioratorius Kretinga	22	9	6	7	33	39	-6	24
KKI Kaunas	22	8	3	11	34	38	-4	19
Audra/Baltija Klaipeda	22	7	5	10	31	38	-7	19
MSK Panevezys	22	7	3	12	40	47	-7	17
Cukraus fab. Kapsukas	22	7	3	12	26	45	-19	17
Lima Kaunas	22	6	4	12	27	42	-15	16
Statybininkas Siauliai	22	6	1	15	32	53	-21	13

=== Final ===
Elnias Siauliai – Raud. zvaigzde Vilnius (3:2)

=== Promotion ===
- KPI Kaunas
- Lok Vilnius

=== Cup ===
==== Semifinal ====
- Inkaras Kaunas – Mastis Telsiai (5:1)
- Panemune – Lok Vilnius (2:0)

==== Final ====
Panemune – Inkaras Kaunas (2:1)

== See also ==
- Lithuanian football standings (1931–1940)
- Lithuanian football standings (1941–1950)
- Lithuanian football standings (1961–1970)
- Lithuanian football standings (1971–1980)
- Lithuanian football standings (1981–1990)

== Sources ==
- RSSF/Almantas Lahzadis
