= Lithuanian football standings (1981–1990) =

The Lithuanian football standings from 1981–1990 are listed below.

== 1981 ==
Toplyga (Aukščiausia Lyga)
| Team Standings | GP | W | D | L | F | A | GD | P |
|---|---|---|---|---|---|---|---|---|
| Granitas Klaipeda | 34 | 20 | 10 | 4 | 55 | 22 | 33 | 50 |
| Kelininkas Kaunas | 34 | 20 | 7 | 7 | 44 | 20 | 24 | 47 |
| Pazanga Vilnius | 34 | 18 | 9 | 7 | 35 | 25 | 10 | 45 |
| Tauras Siauliai | 34 | 17 | 8 | 9 | 51 | 28 | 23 | 42 |
| Statybininkas Siauliai | 34 | 15 | 12 | 7 | 41 | 19 | 22 | 42 |
| Atmosfera Mazeikiai | 34 | 13 | 13 | 8 | 34 | 24 | 10 | 39 |
| Vienybe Ukmerge | 34 | 14 | 11 | 9 | 33 | 25 | 8 | 39 |
| Ekranas Panevezys | 34 | 14 | 9 | 11 | 39 | 34 | 5 | 37 |
| Politechnika Kaunas | 34 | 10 | 15 | 9 | 27 | 26 | 1 | 35 |
| Banga Kaunas | 34 | 12 | 9 | 13 | 41 | 40 | 1 | 33 |
| Inkaras Kaunas | 34 | 12 | 9 | 13 | 41 | 49 | -8 | 33 |
| Ausra Vilnius | 34 | 10 | 12 | 12 | 39 | 38 | 1 | 32 |
| Statyba Jonava | 34 | 11 | 10 | 13 | 35 | 41 | -6 | 32 |
| Nevezis Kedainiai | 34 | 10 | 9 | 15 | 42 | 47 | -5 | 29 |
| Sviesa Vilnius | 34 | 10 | 7 | 17 | 36 | 48 | -12 | 27 |
| Dainava Alytus | 34 | 7 | 7 | 20 | 21 | 55 | -34 | 21 |
| Utenis Utena | 34 | 7 | 4 | 23 | 25 | 42 | -17 | 18 |
| Sveikata Kybartai | 34 | 3 | 6 | 25 | 30 | 86 | -56 | 12 |

=== Promotion ===
- Atletas Kaunas
- Sirvinta Vilkaviskis

=== Cup ===
==== Semifinal ====
- Granitas Klaipeda – Elnias Siauliai (4:0)
- Banga Kaunas – Nevezis Kedainiai (1:0)

==== Final ====
Granitas Klaipeda – Banga Kaunas (2:0)

== 1982 ==
Toplyga
| Team Standings | GP | W | D | L | F | A | GD | P |
|---|---|---|---|---|---|---|---|---|
| Pazanga Vilnius | 29 | 18 | 10 | 1 | 54 | 20 | 34 | 46 |
| Granitas Klaipeda | 29 | 17 | 8 | 4 | 45 | 23 | 22 | 42 |
| Tauras Siauliai | 29 | 16 | 8 | 5 | 41 | 22 | 19 | 40 |
| Kelininkas Kaunas | 29 | 14 | 11 | 4 | 47 | 19 | 28 | 39 |
| Ekranas Panevezys | 29 | 11 | 11 | 7 | 40 | 24 | 16 | 33 |
| Atmosfera Mazeikiai | 29 | 11 | 11 | 7 | 23 | 17 | 6 | 33 |
| Ausra Vilnius | 29 | 11 | 8 | 10 | 34 | 33 | 1 | 30 |
| Statybininkas Siauliai | 29 | 9 | 10 | 10 | 23 | 22 | 1 | 28 |
| Banga Kaunas | 29 | 11 | 5 | 13 | 35 | 35 | 0 | 27 |
| Vienybe Ukmerge | 29 | 9 | 8 | 12 | 38 | 38 | 0 | 26 |
| Statyba Jonava | 29 | 7 | 11 | 11 | 35 | 36 | -1 | 25 |
| Inkaras Kaunas | 29 | 4 | 13 | 12 | 18 | 34 | -16 | 21 |
| Atletas Kaunas | 29 | 5 | 10 | 14 | 18 | 32 | -14 | 20 |
| Politechnika Kaunas | 29 | 6 | 8 | 15 | 29 | 46 | -17 | 20 |
| Sirvinta Vilkaviskis | 29 | 4 | 3 | 22 | 20 | 72 | -52 | 11 |
| Jaunimo rinktine | 15 | 2 | 3 | 10 | 5 | 32 | -27 | 7 |

=== Promotion ===
- Mokslas Vilnius
- Nevezis Kedainiai

=== Cup ===
==== Semifinal ====
- Pazanga Vilnius – Vienybe Ukmerge (2:1)
- Nevezis Kedainiai – Dainava Alytus (2:0)

==== Final ====
Pazanga Vilnius – Nevezis Kedainiai (2:0)

== 1983 ==
Toplyga
| Team Standings | GP | W | D | L | F | A | GD | P |
|---|---|---|---|---|---|---|---|---|
| Pazanga Vilnius | 30 | 18 | 8 | 4 | 54 | 28 | 26 | 44 |
| Granitas Klaipeda | 30 | 18 | 5 | 7 | 51 | 30 | 21 | 41 |
| Tauras Siauliai | 30 | 15 | 10 | 5 | 51 | 32 | 19 | 40 |
| Atmosfera Mazeikiai | 30 | 14 | 12 | 4 | 39 | 30 | 9 | 40 |
| Banga Kaunas | 30 | 14 | 10 | 6 | 50 | 33 | 17 | 38 |
| Kelininkas Kaunas | 30 | 13 | 10 | 7 | 32 | 27 | 5 | 36 |
| Nevezis Kedainiai | 30 | 14 | 7 | 9 | 34 | 40 | -6 | 35 |
| Ekranas Panevezys | 30 | 10 | 9 | 11 | 38 | 32 | 6 | 29 |
| Statyba Jonava | 30 | 10 | 9 | 11 | 39 | 30 | 9 | 29 |
| Atletas Kaunas | 30 | 10 | 7 | 13 | 29 | 34 | -5 | 27 |
| Politechnika Kaunas | 30 | 8 | 11 | 11 | 25 | 34 | -9 | 27 |
| Vienybe Ukmerge | 30 | 7 | 12 | 11 | 30 | 35 | -5 | 26 |
| Statybininkas Siauliai | 30 | 10 | 5 | 15 | 28 | 37 | -9 | 25 |
| Inkaras Kaunas | 30 | 9 | 5 | 16 | 32 | 41 | -9 | 23 |
| Mokslas Vilnius | 30 | 3 | 10 | 17 | 16 | 43 | -27 | 16 |
| Ausra Vilnius | 30 | 0 | 4 | 26 | 26 | 68 | -42 | 4 |

=== Promotion ===
- SRT Vilnius
- Utenis Utena

=== Cup ===
==== Semifinal ====
- Granitas Klaipeda – Kelininkas Kaunas (3:1)
- SRT Vilnius – Pazanga Vilnius (2:1)

==== Final ====
Granitas Klaipeda – SRT Vilnius (2:1)

== 1984 ==
Toplyga
| Team Standings | GP | W | D | L | F | A | GD | P |
|---|---|---|---|---|---|---|---|---|
| Granitas Klaipeda | 34 | 23 | 7 | 4 | 76 | 26 | 50 | 53 |
| Ekranas Panevezys | 34 | 20 | 8 | 6 | 54 | 34 | 20 | 48 |
| SRT Vilnius | 34 | 17 | 12 | 5 | 56 | 33 | 23 | 46 |
| Pazanga Vilnius | 34 | 18 | 9 | 7 | 46 | 29 | 17 | 45 |
| Banga Kaunas | 34 | 14 | 12 | 8 | 45 | 29 | 16 | 40 |
| Statyba Jonava | 34 | 15 | 10 | 9 | 42 | 48 | -6 | 40 |
| Utenis Utena | 34 | 15 | 4 | 15 | 40 | 41 | -1 | 34 |
| Statybininkas Siauliai | 34 | 12 | 10 | 12 | 42 | 44 | -2 | 34 |
| Tauras Siauliai | 34 | 12 | 9 | 13 | 47 | 46 | 1 | 33 |
| Atmosfera Mazeikiai | 34 | 9 | 15 | 10 | 27 | 31 | -4 | 33 |
| Vienybe Ukmerge | 34 | 12 | 9 | 13 | 46 | 41 | 5 | 33 |
| Kelininkas Kaunas | 34 | 10 | 11 | 13 | 44 | 46 | -2 | 31 |
| Inkaras Kaunas | 34 | 7 | 17 | 10 | 28 | 34 | -6 | 31 |
| Atletas Kaunas | 34 | 9 | 9 | 16 | 26 | 44 | -18 | 27 |
| Nevezis Kedainiai | 34 | 6 | 11 | 17 | 42 | 57 | -15 | 23 |
| Moksleiviu rinktine | 34 | 6 | 10 | 18 | 26 | 49 | -23 | 22 |
| Politechnika Kaunas | 34 | 5 | 10 | 19 | 14 | 36 | -22 | 20 |
| Zalgirietis Vilnius | 34 | 3 | 13 | 18 | 18 | 51 | -33 | 19 |

=== Promotion ===
- Aidas Kaunas
- Sveikata Kybartai

=== Cup ===
==== Semifinal ====
- SRT Vilnius – Syrius Klaipeda (2:0)
- Banga Kaunas – Granitas Klaipeda (2:2) (3-2)

==== Final ====
SRT Vilnius – Banga Kaunas (2:2) (3-1)

== 1985 ==
Toplyga
| Team Standings | GP | W | D | L | F | A | GD | P |
|---|---|---|---|---|---|---|---|---|
| Ekranas Panevezys | 31 | 23 | 4 | 4 | 56 | 18 | 38 | 50 |
| Granitas Klaipeda | 31 | 20 | 6 | 5 | 60 | 20 | 40 | 46 |
| SRT Vilnius | 31 | 20 | 4 | 7 | 66 | 25 | 41 | 44 |
| Pazanga Vilnius | 31 | 19 | 6 | 6 | 38 | 18 | 20 | 44 |
| Nevezis Kedainiai | 31 | 12 | 13 | 6 | 42 | 30 | 12 | 37 |
| Banga Kaunas | 31 | 15 | 7 | 9 | 45 | 23 | 22 | 37 |
| Atmosfera Mazeikiai | 31 | 12 | 7 | 12 | 34 | 32 | 2 | 31 |
| Kelininkas Kaunas | 31 | 11 | 9 | 11 | 35 | 38 | -3 | 31 |
| Vienybe Ukmerge | 31 | 11 | 7 | 13 | 34 | 40 | -6 | 29 |
| Utenis Utena | 31 | 11 | 6 | 14 | 32 | 38 | -6 | 28 |
| Tauras Siauliai | 31 | 11 | 6 | 14 | 36 | 46 | -10 | 28 |
| Inkaras Kaunas | 31 | 10 | 6 | 15 | 36 | 44 | -8 | 26 |
| Aidas Kaunas | 31 | 6 | 12 | 13 | 28 | 46 | -18 | 24 |
| Sveikata Kybartai | 31 | 5 | 9 | 17 | 29 | 65 | -36 | 19 |
| Statybininkas Siauliai | 31 | 5 | 9 | 17 | 16 | 44 | -28 | 19 |
| Statyba Jonava | 31 | 4 | 7 | 20 | 26 | 57 | -31 | 15 |
| Jauniu rinktine | 16 | 2 | 0 | 14 | 7 | 36 | -29 | 4 |

=== Promotion ===
- Ausra Vilnius
- Kooperatininkas Plunge

=== Cup ===
==== Semifinal ====
- Ekranas Panevezys – SRT Vilnius (4:0)
- Banga Kaunas – Granitas Klaipeda (3:2)

==== Final ====
Ekranas Panevezys – Banga Kaunas (0:0) (4-3)

== 1986 ==
Toplyga
| Team Standings | GP | W | D | L | F | A | GD | P |
|---|---|---|---|---|---|---|---|---|
| Banga Kaunas | 28 | 19 | 7 | 2 | 50 | 13 | 37 | 45 |
| Granitas Klaipeda | 28 | 18 | 7 | 3 | 55 | 23 | 32 | 43 |
| Ekranas Panevezys | 28 | 20 | 3 | 5 | 45 | 21 | 24 | 43 |
| SRT Vilnius | 28 | 13 | 6 | 9 | 39 | 25 | 14 | 32 |
| Nevezis Kedainiai | 28 | 12 | 6 | 10 | 31 | 29 | 2 | 30 |
| Inkaras Kaunas | 28 | 11 | 6 | 11 | 29 | 28 | 1 | 28 |
| Atmosfera Mazeikiai | 28 | 8 | 11 | 9 | 28 | 33 | -5 | 27 |
| Aidas Kaunas | 28 | 8 | 9 | 11 | 32 | 31 | 1 | 25 |
| Sveikata Kybartai | 28 | 7 | 11 | 10 | 19 | 34 | -15 | 25 |
| Ausra Vilnius | 28 | 7 | 10 | 11 | 23 | 35 | -12 | 24 |
| Tauras Siauliai | 28 | 8 | 7 | 13 | 31 | 36 | -5 | 23 |
| Kelininkas Kaunas | 28 | 6 | 11 | 11 | 20 | 27 | -7 | 23 |
| Utenis Utena | 28 | 7 | 8 | 13 | 30 | 46 | -16 | 22 |
| Vienybe Ukmerge | 28 | 6 | 7 | 15 | 23 | 45 | -22 | 19 |
| Kooperatininkas | 28 | 3 | 5 | 20 | 17 | 46 | -29 | 11 |
| Pazanga Vilnius | * | | | | | | | |

*Note: missing score data.

=== Promotion ===
- Statybininkas Siauliai
- Atletas Kaunas
- Poringe Alytus
- Tauras Taurage

=== Cup ===
==== Semifinal ====
- Granitas Klaipeda – Ekranas Panevezys (2:0)
- Banga Kaunas – Suduva Kapsukas (2:1)

==== Final ====
Granitas Klaipeda – Banga Kaunas (3:1)

== 1987 ==
Toplyga
| Team Standings | GP | W | D | L | F | A | GD | P |
|---|---|---|---|---|---|---|---|---|
| Tauras Taurage | 32 | 23 | 7 | 2 | 48 | 15 | 33 | 53 |
| SRT Vilnius | 32 | 25 | 3 | 4 | 65 | 18 | 47 | 53 |
| Inkaras Kaunas | 32 | 19 | 8 | 5 | 60 | 27 | 33 | 46 |
| Atmosfera Mazeikiai | 32 | 18 | 8 | 6 | 51 | 28 | 23 | 44 |
| Ekranas Panevezys | 32 | 20 | 3 | 9 | 65 | 36 | 29 | 43 |
| Granitas Klaipeda | 32 | 14 | 9 | 9 | 44 | 32 | 12 | 37 |
| Statybininkas Siauliai | 32 | 12 | 8 | 12 | 42 | 35 | 7 | 32 |
| Banga Kaunas | 32 | 12 | 8 | 12 | 45 | 33 | 12 | 32 |
| Nevezis Kedainiai | 32 | 11 | 9 | 12 | 45 | 51 | -6 | 31 |
| Kelininkas Kaunas | 32 | 12 | 7 | 13 | 27 | 28 | -1 | 31 |
| Aidas Kaunas | 32 | 11 | 4 | 17 | 39 | 54 | -15 | 26 |
| Atletas Kaunas | 32 | 8 | 9 | 15 | 25 | 40 | -15 | 25 |
| Poringe Alytus | 32 | 7 | 10 | 15 | 31 | 56 | -25 | 24 |
| Sveikata Kybartai | 32 | 7 | 8 | 17 | 19 | 47 | -28 | 22 |
| Tauras Siauliai | 32 | 5 | 6 | 21 | 29 | 61 | -32 | 16 |
| Ausra Vilnius | 32 | 2 | 11 | 19 | 29 | 63 | -34 | 15 |
| Utenis Utena | 32 | 5 | 4 | 23 | 27 | 67 | -40 | 14 |

=== Final ===
Tauras Taurage – SRT Vilnius (2:2) (3-2)

=== Promotion ===
- Suduva Kapsukas
- Automobilistas Klaipeda
- Vienybe Ukmerge
- Statyba Jonava

=== Cup ===
==== Semifinal ====
- SRT Vilnius – Granitas Klaipeda (2:1)
- Inkaras Kaunas – Banga Kaunas (2:0)

==== Final ====
SRT Vilnius – Inkaras Kaunas (0:0) (5-4)

== 1988 ==
Toplyga
| Team Standings | GP | W | D | L | F | A | GD | P |
|---|---|---|---|---|---|---|---|---|
| SRT Vilnius | 30 | 18 | 11 | 1 | 70 | 26 | 44 | 47 |
| Inkaras Kaunas | 30 | 16 | 13 | 1 | 47 | 20 | 27 | 45 |
| Ekranas Panevezys | 30 | 17 | 8 | 5 | 52 | 20 | 32 | 42 |
| Kelininkas Kaunas | 30 | 14 | 9 | 7 | 46 | 31 | 15 | 37 |
| Atmosfera Mazeikiai | 30 | 16 | 5 | 9 | 49 | 31 | 18 | 37 |
| Banga Kaunas | 30 | 12 | 12 | 6 | 39 | 22 | 17 | 36 |
| Tauras Taurage | 30 | 14 | 7 | 9 | 48 | 37 | 11 | 35 |
| Granitas Klaipeda | 30 | 12 | 8 | 10 | 65 | 34 | 31 | 32 |
| Statybininkas Siauliai | 30 | 11 | 8 | 11 | 32 | 31 | 1 | 30 |
| Vienybe Ukmerge | 30 | 12 | 5 | 13 | 38 | 49 | -11 | 29 |
| Poringe Alytus | 30 | 8 | 12 | 10 | 41 | 48 | -7 | 28 |
| Suduva Marijampole | 30 | 6 | 10 | 14 | 39 | 43 | -4 | 22 |
| Atletas Kaunas | 30 | 7 | 8 | 15 | 34 | 43 | -9 | 22 |
| Statyba Jonava | 30 | 7 | 4 | 19 | 31 | 62 | -31 | 18 |
| Nevezis Kedainiai | 30 | 5 | 7 | 18 | 37 | 59 | -22 | 17 |
| Automobilistas Klaipeda | 30 | 1 | 1 | 28 | 17 | 129 | -112 | 3 |

=== Promotion ===
- Neris Vilnius
- Sirijus Klaipeda

=== Cup ===
==== Semifinal ====
- Sirijus Klaipeda – Ekranas Panevezys (4:0)
- Kelininkas Kaunas – SRT Vilnius (2:1)

==== Final ====
Sirijus Klaipeda – Kelininkas Kaunas (3:2)

== 1989 ==
Toplyga
| Team Standings | GP | W | D | L | F | A | GD | P |
|---|---|---|---|---|---|---|---|---|
| Banga Kaunas | 29 | 17 | 9 | 3 | 48 | 16 | 32 | 43 |
| Ekranas Panevezys | 29 | 17 | 8 | 4 | 51 | 19 | 32 | 42 |
| Sirijus Klaipeda | 29 | 16 | 7 | 6 | 36 | 21 | 15 | 39 |
| Granitas Klaipeda | 29 | 14 | 7 | 8 | 54 | 32 | 22 | 35 |
| Tauras Taurage | 29 | 13 | 9 | 7 | 40 | 26 | 14 | 35 |
| Atmosfera Mazeikiai | 29 | 14 | 6 | 9 | 36 | 28 | 8 | 34 |
| Gel. Vilkas Vilnius | 29 | 13 | 8 | 8 | 29 | 24 | 5 | 34 |
| Kelininkas Kaunas | 29 | 12 | 7 | 10 | 43 | 35 | 8 | 31 |
| Atletas Kaunas | 29 | 11 | 7 | 11 | 34 | 38 | -4 | 29 |
| Statybininkas Siauliai | 29 | 10 | 3 | 16 | 26 | 41 | -15 | 23 |
| Vienybe Ukmerge | 29 | 9 | 4 | 16 | 34 | 37 | -3 | 22 |
| Poringe Alytus | 29 | 7 | 7 | 15 | 27 | 77 | -50 | 21 |
| Neris Vilnius | 29 | 6 | 8 | 15 | 30 | 44 | -14 | 20 |
| Suduva Marijampole | 29 | 6 | 4 | 19 | 26 | 43 | -17 | 16 |
| Lietuvos j. r. | 29 | 6 | 3 | 6 | 16 | 17 | -1 | 15 |
| Statyba Jonava | 29 | 3 | 5 | 21 | 22 | 54 | -32 | 11 |

=== Promotion ===
- Tauras Siauliai
- Panerys Vilnius
- Neris Vilnius – Mastis Telsiai (0:0) (3:1)
- Suduva Marijampole – Poli Kaunas (2:0) (2:0)

=== Cup ===
==== Semifinal ====
- Tauras Taurage – Geguzes pirmoji Jurbarkas (3:?)
- Banga Kaunas – Vienybe Ukmerge (2:1)

==== Final ====
Banga Kaunas – Tauras Taurage (2:0)

== 1990 ==
Baltic Championship
| Team Standings | GP | W | D | L | F | A | GD | P |
|---|---|---|---|---|---|---|---|---|
| Zalgiris Vilnius | 32 | 27 | 4 | 1 | 104 | 11 | 93 | 58 |
| Sirijus Klaipeda | 32 | 19 | 9 | 4 | 47 | 19 | 28 | 47 |
| Ekranas Panevezys | 32 | 19 | 8 | 5 | 62 | 24 | 38 | 46 |
| Progress Cherniah. (RUS) | 32 | 19 | 4 | 9 | 46 | 33 | 13 | 42 |
| Jovaras Mazeikiai | 32 | 16 | 8 | 8 | 40 | 25 | 15 | 40 |
| Inkaras Kaunas | 32 | 15 | 9 | 8 | 54 | 25 | 29 | 39 |
| Banga Kaunas | 32 | 13 | 11 | 8 | 45 | 30 | 15 | 37 |
| RAF Jelgava (LAT) | 32 | 13 | 10 | 9 | 44 | 37 | 7 | 36 |
| Sakalas Siauliai | 32 | 11 | 12 | 9 | 41 | 32 | 9 | 34 |
| Sport Tallinn (EST) | 32 | 11 | 11 | 10 | 43 | 39 | 4 | 33 |
| Neris Vilnius | 32 | 10 | 8 | 14 | 27 | 47 | -20 | 28 |
| Stroitel Daugavpils (LAT) | 32 | 8 | 7 | 17 | 29 | 45 | -16 | 23 |
| Torpedo Riga (LAT) | 32 | 6 | 10 | 16 | 29 | 49 | -20 | 22 |
| KKI Daugava Riga (LAT) | 32 | 4 | 13 | 15 | 16 | 49 | -33 | 21 |
| Pardaugava Riga (LAT) | 32 | 5 | 8 | 19 | 24 | 53 | -29 | 18 |
| Metallurgs Liepaja (LAT) | 32 | 4 | 5 | 23 | 20 | 97 | -77 | 13 |
| Suduva Marijampole | 32 | 1 | 5 | 26 | 13 | 69 | -56 | 7 |

Toplyga
| Team Standings | GP | W | D | L | F | A | GD | P |
|---|---|---|---|---|---|---|---|---|
| Panerys Vilnius | 32 | 20 | 6 | 4 | 48 | 18 | 30 | 46 |
| Granitas Klaipeda | 32 | 20 | 6 | 4 | 57 | 16 | 41 | 46 |
| Sirijietis Klaipeda | 32 | 14 | 9 | 7 | 38 | 27 | 11 | 37 |
| Elektronas Taurage | 32 | 15 | 6 | 9 | 35 | 29 | 6 | 36 |
| Vienybe Ukmerge | 32 | 14 | 8 | 8 | 51 | 32 | 19 | 36 |
| Vilija Kaunas | 32 | 14 | 7 | 9 | 64 | 39 | 25 | 35 |
| Atletas Kaunas | 32 | 11 | 11 | 8 | 30 | 22 | 8 | 33 |
| Tauras Siauliai | 32 | 13 | 6 | 11 | 53 | 41 | 12 | 32 |
| Viltis Vilnius | 32 | 10 | 10 | 10 | 50 | 32 | 18 | 30 |
| Dainava Alytus | 32 | 11 | 7 | 12 | 33 | 46 | -13 | 29 |
| Nevezis Kedainiai | 32 | 10 | 7 | 13 | 40 | 40 | 0 | 27 |
| Gel. Vilkas Vilnius | 32 | 10 | 7 | 13 | 39 | 41 | -2 | 27 |
| Politechnika Kaunas | 32 | 8 | 6 | 16 | 27 | 56 | -29 | 22 |
| Mastis Telsiai | 32 | 5 | 10 | 15 | 28 | 55 | -27 | 20 |
| Sveikata Kybartai | 32 | 5 | 6 | 19 | 20 | 61 | -41 | 16 |
| Sirvinta Vilkaviskis | 32 | 2 | 4 | 24 | 19 | 77 | -58 | 8 |

=== Lithuanian Championship Play-off ===
Quarterfinals
| Team 1 | Team 2 | Score 1 | Score 2 |
|---|---|---|---|
| Zalgiris Vilnius | Elektronas Taurage | 6–0 | 3–0 |
| Ekranas Panevezys | Granitas Klaipeda | 1–1 | 2–0 |
| Panerys Vilnius | Jovaras Mazeikiai | 1–0 | 1–1 |
| Sirijus Klaipeda | Sirijietis Klaipeda | 2–0 | 1–2 |
Semifinal
| Ekranas Panevezys | Zalgiris Vilnius | 2–1 | 0–1 |
| Sirijus Klaipeda | Panerys Vilnius | 3–2 | 2–1 |
Third Place Match
| Zalgiris Vilnius | Panerys Vilnius | 1–0 | |
Final
| Sirijus Klaipeda | Ekranas Panevezys | 0:0 (3–2) | |

=== Cup ===
==== Semifinal ====
- Zalgiris Vilnius – Neris Vilnius (4:0)
- Sirijus Klaipeda – Jovaras Mazeikiai (1:0)

==== Final ====
Sirijus Klaipeda – Zalgiris Vilnius (0:0) (4-3)

== See also ==
- Lithuanian football standings (1931–1940)
- Lithuanian football standings (1941–1950)
- Lithuanian football standings (1951–1960)
- Lithuanian football standings (1961–1970)
- Lithuanian football standings (1971–1980)

== Sources ==
- RSSF/Almantas Lahzadis
