= Lithuanian football standings (1931–1940) =

The Lithuanian football standings from 1931–1940 are listed below.

== 1931 ==
Team Standings	GP	W	D	L	F	A	GD	P
KSS Klaipeda	6	4	2	0	24	7	17	10
Kovas Kaunas	6	4	0	2	22	14	8	8
Freya Klaipeda	6	3	1	2	7	16	-9	7
Sveikata Kybartai	6	2	2	2	14	14	0	6
LGSF Kaunas	6	3	0	3	12	12	0	6
LFLS Kaunas	6	2	1	3	11	10	1	5
Tauras Kaunas	6	0	0	6	1	18	-17	0

=== Promotion ===
- Makabi Kaunas – Tauras Kaunas (1:2) +:-
- Makabi Siauliai

== 1932 ==
Team Standings	GP	W	D	L	F	A	GD	P
LFLS Kaunas	7	6	0	1	20	6	14	12
KSS Klaipeda	7	5	2	0	29	7	22	12
LGSF Kaunas	7	3	2	2	18	9	9	8
Sveikata Kybartai	7	4	0	3	12	9	3	8
Kovas Kaunas	7	2	3	2	18	9	9	7
Makabi Kaunas	7	2	1	4	9	29	-20	5
Freya VfR Klaipeda	7	1	1	5	5	10	-5	3
Makabi Siauliai	7	0	1	6	2	34	-32	1

=== Final ===
LFLS Kaunas – Kss Klaipeda (6:1)

==== Promotion ====
- Spielvereiningung Klaipeda
- SSK Siauliai

== 1933 ==
Team Standings	GP	W	D	L	F	A	GD	P
Kovas Kaunas	12	8	3	1	33	13	20	19
LFLS Kaunas	12	7	4	1	23	16	7	18
LGSF Kaunas	12	5	2	5	37	27	10	12
KSS Klaipeda	12	5	1	6	28	24	4	11
Spielvereiningung Klaipeda	12	5	1	6	11	15	-4	11 *
Makabi Kaunas	12	1	4	7	13	36	-23	6 *
Sveikata Kybartai	12	0	5	7	10	24	-14	5

=== Promotion ===
- MSK Kaunas
- Makabi Panevezys

== 1934 ==
Team Standings	GP	W	D	L	F	A	GD	P
MSK Kaunas	11	6	2	3	30	14	16	14
LFLS Kaunas	11	6	2	3	28	12	16	14
LGSF Kaunas	11	6	2	3	31	18	13	14
Kovas Kaunas	11	5	3	3	34	15	19	13
KSS Klaipeda	11	4	2	5	22	33	-11	10
Sveikata Kybartai	11	2	3	6	19	36	-17	7
Makabi Panevezys	6	0	0	6	2	38	-36	0

=== Final ===
MSK Kaunas – LFLS Kaunas (2:2) (5:1)

==== Promotion ====
Tauras Kaunas – Kovas Kaunas (1:4) (3:1) (3:1)

== 1935 ==
Kaunas Group
Team Standings	GP	W	D	L	F	A	GD	P
Kovas Kaunas	10	6	1	3	24	15	9	13
MSK Kaunas	10	5	3	2	21	8	13	13
LFLS Kaunas	10	4	3	3	23	18	5	11
LGSF Kaunas	10	3	4	3	18	24	-6	10
Tauras Kaunas	10	2	3	5	10	18	-8	7
CJSO Kaunas	10	2	2	6	10	23	13	6

=== Final ===
Kovas Kaunas – MSK Kaunas (2:1) +:-

Klaipeda Group
Team Standings	GP	W	D	L	F	A	GD	P
KSS Klaipeda	4	4	0	0	24	1	23	8
Saulys Klaipeda	4	2	0	2	6	11	-5	4
MSK Klaipeda	3	1	0	2	5	13	-8	2
KDS Klaipeda	3	0	0	3	1	11	-10	0

Siauliai Group
Team Standings	GP	W	D	L	F	A	GD	P
Sakalas Šiauliai	5	5	0	0	25	1	24	10
VIII pestinink. plk.	5	3	1	1	18	14	4	7
SSK Siauliai	5	3	1	1	16	13	3	7
Makabi Siauliai	5	1	1	3	11	18	-7	3
LGSF Siauliai	5	1	1	3	7	18	-11	3
JSO Siauliai	5	0	0	5	3	16	-13	0

Panevezys Group
Team Standings	GP	W	D	L	F	A	GD	P
Saulys Panevezys	2	2	0	0	9	1	8	4
MSK Panevezys	2	1	0	1	6	4	2	2
JSO Panevezys	2	0	0	2	1	11	-10	0

==== Suduva Group ====
Orija Kalvarija – Sveikata Kybartai (2:1)

==== Ukmerge Group ====
Saulys Ukmerge – Sparta Ukmerge (4:0)

==== Zemaitija Group ====
Dziugas Telsiai – Saulys Seda (3:1)

==== 1/8 Final ====
Sakalas Siauliai – Dziugas Telsiai (3:1)

==== Quarterfinal ====
- Saulys Ukmerge – Orija Kalvarija (5:0)
- Sakalas Siauliai – Saulys Panevezys +:-

==== Semifinal ====
- Kovas Kaunas – Saulys Ukmerge (6:2)
- KSS Klaipeda – Sakalas Siauliai (7:0)

=== Final ===
Kovas Kaunas – KSS Klaipeda (3:2)

== 1936 ==
Team Standings	GP	W	D	L	F	A	GD	P
Kovas Kaunas	7	7	0	0	25	3	22	14
LFLS Kaunas	7	5	0	2	15	13	2	10
LGSF Kaunas	7	4	0	3	12	12	0	8
MSK Kaunas	7	3	1	3	13	7	6	7
Tauras Kaunas	7	3	0	4	11	16	-5	6
CJSO Kaunas	7	3	0	4	7	15	-8	6
KSS Klaipeda	7	2	1	4	18	15	3	5
Saulys Klaipeda	7	0	0	7	5	25	-20	0

== 1937 ==
Team Standings	GP	W	D	L	F	A	GD	P
KSS Klaipeda	16	13	2	1	61	17	44	28
Kovas Kaunas	16	8	5	3	33	19	14	21
LFLS Kaunas	16	8	5	3	28	15	13	21
MSK Kaunas	16	8	4	4	17	12	5	20
CJSO Kaunas	16	6	6	4	16	17	-1	18
LGSF Kaunas	16	6	1	9	23	24	-1	13
Svyturys Klaipeda	16	4	2	10	18	30	-12	10
Tauras Kaunas	16	3	2	11	20	37	-17	8
Saulys Marijampole	16	0	5	11	10	55	-45	5

== 1937/38 ==
Team Standings	GP	W	D	L	F	A	GD	P
KSS Klaipeda	18	12	2	4	54	20	34	26
LGSF Kaunas	18	12	2	4	43	18	25	26
Svyturys Klaipeda	18	11	2	5	34	20	14	24
Kovas Kaunas	18	9	5	4	44	24	20	23
MSK Kaunas	18	7	7	4	36	25	11	21
LFLS Kaunas	18	8	4	6	34	22	12	20
CJSO Kaunas	18	7	2	9	30	30	0	16
Makabi Kaunas	18	5	3	10	25	45	-20	13
JSO Kybartai	18	2	2	14	15	60	-45	6
Sakalas Siauliai	18	2	1	15	15	66	-51	5

=== Final ===
KSS Klaipeda – LGSF Kaunas (3:1)

==== Promotion ====
- Tauras Kaunas – Makabi Kaunas (1:2) (5:0) (4:1)
- Sudavija Vilkaviskis
- Dziugas Telsiai

== 1938/39 ==
Team Standings	GP	W	D	L	F	A	GD	P
LGSF Kaunas	13	8	1	4	31	20	11	17
Kovas Kaunas	13	8	0	5	28	18	10	16
KSS Klaipeda/Telsiai	13	8	0	5	34	31	3	16
Tauras Kaunas	13	5	3	5	21	17	4	13
CJSO Kaunas	13	5	3	5	23	24	-1	13
LFLS Kaunas	13	4	3	6	20	25	-5	11
MSK Kaunas	13	4	1	8	15	26	-11	9
Svyturys Klaipeda	7	1	1	5	9	20	-11	3

Note: German invasion in Klaipeda.

== 1939/40 ==
Autumn Season
Team Standings	GP	W	D	L	F	A	GD	P
LGSF Kaunas	7	5	2	0	22	4	18	12
Tauras Kaunas	7	4	1	2	16	10	6	9
LFLS Kaunas	6	4	0	2	19	11	8	8
CJSO Kaunas	7	4	0	3	11	7	4	8
MSK Kaunas	7	3	1	3	8	10	-2	7
KSS Telsiai	6	2	1	3	3	10	-7	5
Sakalas Siauliai	7	2	0	5	6	17	-11	4
Kovas Kaunas	7	0	1	6	8	24	-16	1

Spring Season – Kaunas Group
Team Standings	GP	W	D	L	F	A	GD	P
LGSF Kaunas	8	5	3	0	20	3	17	13
Tauras Kaunas	8	4	3	1	22	13	9	11
LFLS Kaunas	8	3	2	3	25	17	8	8
MSK Kaunas	8	2	1	5	10	24	-14	5
Kovas Kaunas	8	1	1	6	12	32	-20	3

Spring Season – Zemaitija Group
Team Standings	GP	W	D	L	F	A	GD	P
Sakalas Siauliai	4	4	0	0	13	3	10	8
KSS Telsiai	4	3	0	1	22	4	18	6
Zinia Siauliai	4	1	1	2	7	7	0	3
Makabi Siauliai	4	1	1	2	5	18	-13	3
Dziugas Telsiai	4	0	0	4	1	16	-15	0

== See also ==
- Lithuanian football standings (1941–1950)
- Lithuanian football standings (1951–1960)
- Lithuanian football standings (1961–1970)
- Lithuanian football standings (1971–1980)
- Lithuanian football standings (1981–1990)

== Sources ==
- RSSF/Almantas Lahzadis
