= Lithuanian football standings (1961–1970) =

The Lithuanian football standings from 1961–1970 are listed below.

== 1960/61 ==
Class A - Group I
Team Standings	GP	W	D	L	F	A	GD	P
MSK Panevezys	22	17	3	2	79	26	53	37
Elnias Siauliai	22	17	2	3	60	15	45	36
Linu audiniai Plunge	22	12	4	6	45	25	20	28
KPI Kaunas	22	12	3	7	50	28	22	27
MSK Taurage	22	10	5	7	37	39	-2	25
Zalrigis N. Vilnia	22	11	1	10	42	39	3	23
Spartakas/Troleibusas V.	22	9	3	10	34	54	-20	21
KKI Kaunas	22	8	3	11	38	29	9	19
Raud. Spalis Kaunas	22	7	3	12	32	47	-15	17
Kooperatininkas Alytus	22	5	4	13	27	42	-15	14
EAG Kedainiai	22	4	2	16	20	68	-48	10
RMG Radviliskis	22	2	3	17	23	75	-52	7

Class A - Group II
Team Standings	GP	W	D	L	F	A	GD	P
Baltija Klaipeda	22	14	3	5	60	28	32	31
Inkaras Kaunas	22	14	3	5	42	21	21	31
Lima Kaunas	22	12	2	8	46	37	9	26
Raud. zvaigzde Vilnius	22	10	6	6	36	33	3	26
Kooperatininkas Vilkaviskis	22	11	2	9	46	36	10	24
Meliorator./Laisve Kret.	22	9	4	9	37	41	-4	22
Mastis Telsiai	22	9	3	10	44	38	6	21
Statybininkas Siauliai	22	10	1	11	34	52	-18	21
Cementininkas N.Akmene	22	9	2	11	37	39	-2	20
Sesupe Kapsukas	22	8	3	11	43	42	1	19
Lok Vilnius	22	6	2	14	25	40	-15	14
Kooperatininkas Ukmerge	22	3	3	16	40	47	-7	9

Top Four - Finals
Team Standings	GP	W	D	L	F	A	GD	P
Elnias Siauliai	3	1	2	0	6	2	4	4
Baltija Klaipeda	3	1	1	1	6	6	0	3
Inkaras Kaunas	3	1	1	1	6	7	-1	3
MSK Panevezys	3	1	0	2	7	10	-3	2

Final Scores
Team 1	Team 2	Score 1	Score 2
Linu audiniai Plunge	Lima Kaunas	2–2	3–2
KPI Kaunas	Raud. zvaigzde Vilnius	1–0	2–1
MSK Taurage	Kooperatininkas Vilkaviskis	3–3	4–0
Zalgiris N. Vilnia	Laisve Kretinga	3–3	4–0
Mastis Telsiai	Troleibusas Vilnius	4–2	1–1
Statybininkas Siauliai	KKI Kaunas	+:-*	
Cementininkas N.Akmene	Raud. Spalis Kaunas	4–2	6–3
Kooperatininkas Alytus	Sesupe Kapsukas	3–0	1–0
EAG Kedainiai	Lok Vilnius	5–3	1–1
Koopertininkas Ukmerge	RMG Radviliskis	3–2	3–4

*Note: missing score data.

=== Cup ===
==== Semifinal ====
- Cementininkas N.Akmene – Baltija Klaipeda (2:1)
- EAG Kedainiai – Karin. Namai Vilnius (1:0)

==== Final ====
Cementininkas N.Akmene – EAG Kedainiai (1:0)

== 1961/62 ==
Class A - Group I
Team Standings	GP	W	D	L	F	A	GD	P
Inkaras Kaunas	22	14	6	2	58	15	43	34
Elnias Siauliai	22	12	7	3	49	27	22	31
Cementininkas N.Akmene	22	12	7	3	36	22	14	31
Politechnika (KPI) Kaunas	22	11	4	7	49	33	16	26
Linu audiniai Plunge	22	9	7	6	43	24	19	25
Dainava Alytus	22	9	4	9	33	39	-6	22
Nevezis (EAG) Kedainiai	22	8	3	11	38	47	-9	19
Tauras (MSK) Taurage	22	7	5	10	42	51	-9	19
Mastis Telsiai	22	5	5	12	36	43	-7	15
Audra Klaipeda	22	4	7	11	25	55	-30	15
Ausra Vilnius	22	4	6	12	23	46	-23	14
Baldininkas Ukmerge	22	4	5	13	32	62	-30	13

Class A - Group II
Team Standings	GP	W	D	L	F	A	GD	P
Atletas (KKI) Kaunas	22	16	4	2	60	18	42	36
Granitas (Baltija) Klaip.	22	15	4	3	57	22	35	34
Lima Kaunas	22	15	2	5	52	27	25	32
Metalas Vilkaviskis	22	10	5	7	35	34	1	25
Maistas (MSK) Panevezys	22	10	2	10	63	37	26	22
Kauno audiniai	22	9	3	10	38	41	-3	21
Elfa Vilnius	22	8	5	9	35	53	-18	21
Sesupe Kapsukas	22	9	1	12	42	47	-5	19
Raud. zvaigzde Vilnius	22	7	5	10	36	48	-12	19
Minija Kretinga	22	5	4	13	31	48	-17	14
Sakalas (MSK) Siauliai	22	3	5	14	22	54	-32	11
Elektra (ETG) Mazeikiai	22	5	0	17	36	78	-42	10

Top Eight - Finals
Team Standings	GP	W	D	L	F	A	GD	P
Atletas Kaunas	26	20	4	2	65	19	46	44
Granitas Klaipeda	26	18	4	4	68	27	41	40
Inkaras Kaunas	26	16	6	4	62	23	39	38
Cementininkas N.Akmene	26	14	8	4	41	25	16	36
Lima Kaunas	26	16	3	7	57	34	23	35
Elnias Siauliai	26	12	8	6	53	36	17	32
Politechnika Kaunas	26	12	4	10	55	40	15	28
Metalas Vilkaviskis	26	11	6	9	41	42	-1	28

Final Scores
Team 1	Team 2	Score 1	Score 2
Linu audiniai Plunge	Maistas Panevezys	1–0	*
Kauno audiniai	Dainava Alytus	2–1	6–1
Nevezis Kedainiai	Elfa Vilnius	+:-*	
Tauras Taurage	Sesupe Kapsukas	+:-*	
Mastis Telsiai	Raud. zvaigzde	+:-*	
Minija Kretinga	Audra Klaipeda	2–0	+:-*
Sakalas Siauliai	Ausra Vilnius	+:-*	
Baldininkas Ukmerge	Elektra Mazeikiai	+:-*	

*Note: missing score data.

=== Cup ===
==== Semifinal ====
- Lima Kaunas – Baldininkas Jonava (3:1)
- Sesupe Kapsukas – Mastis Telsiai (3:0)

==== Final ====
Lima Kaunas – Sesupe Kapsukas (3:1)

== 1962/63 ==
Class A - Group I
Team Standings	GP	W	D	L	F	A	GD	P
Maistas/Statyba Panevezys	22	17	5	0	66	21	45	39
Statybininkas Siauliai	22	10	5	7	36	30	6	25
Zalgiris N.Vilnia	22	8	8	6	25	24	1	24
Lima Kaunas	22	7	9	6	32	26	6	23
Tauras Taurage	22	6	11	5	40	39	1	23
Atletas Kaunas	22	7	8	7	25	17	8	22
Kauno audiniai	22	9	3	10	42	47	-5	21
Metalas Vilkaviskis	22	8	5	9	25	35	-10	21
Cementininkas N.Akmene	22	7	6	9	23	22	1	20
Baltija Klaipeda	22	6	7	9	35	43	-8	19
Baldininkas Ukmerge	22	6	5	11	33	55	-22	17
Nevezis Kedainiai	22	3	4	15	31	54	-23	10

Class A - Group II
Team Standings	GP	W	D	L	F	A	GD	P
Poli Kaunas	22	16	5	1	49	12	37	37
Inkaras Kaunas	22	15	6	1	46	16	30	36
Minija Kretinga	22	11	4	7	47	27	20	26
Elfa Vilnius	22	9	5	8	38	38	0	23
Granitas Klaipeda	22	9	5	8	30	34	-4	23
Linu audiniai Plunge	22	9	3	10	33	34	-1	21
Elnias Siauliai	22	8	4	10	33	33	0	20
Elektra Mazeikiai	22	8	1	13	31	48	-17	17
Mastis Telsiai	22	6	5	11	22	46	-24	17
Dainava Alytus	22	7	2	13	28	37	-9	16
Suduva Kapsukas	22	6	3	13	20	40	-20	15
Ekranas Vilnius	22	5	3	14	28	40	-12	13

Top Eight - Finals
Team Standings	GP	W	D	L	F	A	GD	P
Statyba Panevezys	26	21	5	0	79	26	53	47
Poli Kaunas	26	18	6	2	60	17	43	42
Inkaras Kaunas	26	18	6	2	52	18	34	42
Minija Kretinga	26	12	5	9	54	34	20	29
Lima Kaunas	26	8	11	7	37	31	6	27
Elfa Vilnius	26	10	7	9	48	47	1	27
Statybininkas Siauliai	26	10	6	10	41	47	-6	26
Zalgiris N.Vilnia	26	8	9	9	25	31	-6	25

=== Cup ===
==== Semifinal ====
- Saliutas Vilnius – Lima Kaunas (1:0)
- Zalgiris N.Vinia – Statyba Panevezys (1:0)

==== Final ====
Saliutas Vilnius – Zalgiris N.Vilnia (1:0)

== 1964 ==
Class A
Team Standings	GP	W	D	L	F	A	GD	P
Inkaras Kaunas	30	24	2	4	72	18	54	50
Statyba Panevezys	30	16	8	6	61	32	29	40
Minija Kretinga	30	15	8	7	59	40	19	38
Lima Kaunas	30	15	8	7	50	38	12	38
Elfa Vilnius	30	16	4	10	49	38	11	36
Elnias Siauliai	30	15	6	9	47	41	6	36
Atletas Kaunas	30	12	8	10	33	39	-6	32
Statybininkas Siauliai	30	11	8	11	43	36	7	30
Elektra Mazeikiai	30	13	4	13	42	39	3	30
Linu audiniai Plunge	30	10	7	13	44	57	-13	27
Poli Kaunas	30	9	8	13	39	51	-12	26
Kauno audiniai	30	10	5	15	35	44	-9	25
Tauras Taurage	30	8	6	16	39	55	-16	22
Metalas Vilkaviskis	30	6	7	17	25	40	-15	19
Zalgiris N.Vilnia	30	6	7	17	20	48	-28	19
Granitas Klaipeda	30	4	4	22	19	61	-42	12

=== Promotion ===
- Nevezis Kedainiai
- Baltija Klaipeda
- Saliutas Vilnius
- Alytis Alytus

=== Cup ===
==== Semifinal ====
- Minija Kretinga – Elnias Siauliai (3:1)
- Baltija Klaipeda – Inkaras Kaunas (2:0)

==== Final ====
Minija Kretinga – Baltija Klaipeda (3:2)

== 1965 ==
Class A
Team Standings	GP	W	D	L	F	A	GD	P
Inkaras Kaunas	30	18	10	2	73	26	47	46
Saliutas Vilnius	30	17	9	4	68	18	50	43
Statyba Panevezys	30	17	4	9	63	36	27	38
Nevezis Kedainiai	30	15	6	9	55	35	20	36
Statybininkas Siauliai	30	12	9	9	43	31	12	33
Elnias Siauliai	30	11	11	8	43	36	7	33
Baltija Klaipeda	30	12	9	9	46	43	3	33
Lima Kaunas	30	12	9	9	33	36	-3	33
Elektra Mazeikiai	30	14	3	13	49	53	-4	31
Minija Kretinga	30	13	4	13	50	45	5	30
Poli Kaunas	30	10	5	15	55	46	9	25
Linu audiniai Plunge	30	7	10	13	43	60	-17	24
Elfa Vilnius	30	10	2	18	37	72	-35	22
Tauras Taurage	30	8	5	17	33	58	-25	21
Alytis Alytus	30	5	6	19	32	74	-42	16
Atletas Kaunas	30	5	6	19	25	79	-54	16

=== Promotion ===
- Vimpelas Kaunas
- Cementininkas N.Akmene

=== Cup ===
==== Semifinal ====
- Inkaras Kaunas – Elektra Mazeikiai (1:0)
- Saliutas Vilnius – Vimpelas Kaunas (2:0)

==== Final ====
Inkaras Kaunas – Saliutas Vilnius (4:2)

== 1966 ==
Toplyga (Aukščiausia Lyga)
Team Standings	GP	W	D	L	F	A	GD	P
Nevezis Kedainiai	28	16	9	3	57	22	35	41
Statybininkas Siauliai	28	16	8	4	39	20	19	40
Saliutas Vilnius	28	16	6	6	41	17	24	38
Inkaras Kaunas	28	15	3	10	49	31	18	33
Lima Kaunas	28	12	9	7	42	34	8	33
Statyba Panevezys	28	14	4	10	41	32	9	32
Elnias Siauliai	28	9	11	8	30	30	0	29
Linu audiniai Plunge	28	11	7	10	32	38	-6	29
Vimpelas Kaunas	28	8	11	9	31	25	6	27
Poli Kaunas	28	9	9	10	28	26	2	27
Atletas Kaunas	28	7	11	10	36	42	-6	25
Cementininkas N.Akmene	28	7	10	11	26	48	-22	24
Minija Kretinga	28	7	6	15	30	40	-10	20
Baltija Klaipeda	28	5	9	14	31	37	-6	19
Elektra Mazeikiai	28	1	1	26	9	80	-71	3

=== Promotion ===
- Chemikas Klaipeda
- Zalgiris N. Vilnia

=== Cup ===
==== Semifinal ====
- Zalgiris N.Vilnia – Inkaras Kaunas (1:0)
- Saliutas Vilnius – Elnias Siauliai (2:0)

==== Final ====
Zalgiris N.Vilnia – Saliutas Vilnius (0:0) (1:0)

== 1967 ==
Toplyga
Team Standings	GP	W	D	L	F	A	GD	P
Saliutas Vilnius	28	17	9	2	43	11	32	43
Inkaras Kaunas	28	16	8	4	33	14	19	40
Nevezis Kedainiai	28	13	11	4	34	12	22	37
Statyba Panevezys	28	16	4	8	42	19	23	36
Minija Kretinga	28	11	11	6	36	25	11	33
Politechnika Kaunas	28	11	8	9	34	26	8	30
Statybininkas Siauliai	28	9	11	8	35	26	9	29
Zalgiris N. Vilnia	28	7	12	9	28	27	1	26
Atletas Kaunas	28	7	12	9	19	23	-4	26
Lima Kaunas	28	10	5	13	26	38	-12	25
Linu audiniai Plunge	28	9	4	15	18	39	-21	22
Chemikas Klaipeda	28	7	6	15	19	39	-20	20
Banga Kaunas	28	5	8	15	17	39	-22	18
Baltija Klaipeda	28	7	4	17	16	47	-31	18
Elnias Siauliai	28	6	5	17	22	37	-15	17

=== Promotion ===
- Autoparkas Kaunas
- Suduva Kapsukas

=== Winners by group ===
- Group A Zalgiris – Autoparkas Kaunas
- Group A Nemunas – Technika Radviliskis

=== Cup ===
==== Semifinal ====
- Nevezis Kedainiai – Minija Kedainiai (2:2) (1:0)
- Statyba Panevezys – Politechnika Kaunas (1:0)

==== Final ====
Nevezis Kedainiai – Statyba Panevezys (2:1)

== 1968 ==
Toplyga
Team Standings	GP	W	D	L	F	A	GD	P
Statyba Panevezys	30	22	8	0	69	19	50	52
Nevezis Kedainiai	30	22	7	1	64	15	49	51
Statybininkas Siauliai	30	18	6	6	62	19	43	42
Inkaras Kaunas	30	16	6	8	54	36	18	38
Atletas Kaunas	30	11	11	8	26	21	5	33
Zalgiris N. Vilnia	30	13	6	11	33	42	-9	32
Politechnika Kaunas	30	12	6	12	45	38	7	30
Elnias Siauliai	30	11	8	11	30	38	-8	30
Saliutas/Pazanga Vilnius	30	9	9	12	30	32	-2	27
Banga Kaunas	30	11	5	14	29	35	-6	27
Granitas Klaipeda	30	8	10	12	22	28	-6	26
Suduva Kapsukas	30	9	8	13	37	45	-8	26
Lima Kaunas	30	7	8	15	34	60	-26	22
Minija Kretinga	30	6	8	16	33	50	-17	20
Linu audiniai Plunge	30	5	3	22	30	59	-29	13
Autoparkas Kaunas	30	3	5	22	21	82	-61	11

=== Promotion ===
- Ekranas Panavezys
- Vienybe Ukmerge
- Tauras Taurage

=== Winners by group ===
- Group A Zalgiris – Ekranas Panevezys
- Group A Nemunas – Vienybe Ukmerge

=== Cup ===
==== Semifinal ====
- Nevezis Kedainiai – Saliutas Vilnius (2:1)
- Pazanga Vinius – Baldininkas Ukmerge +:-

==== Final ====
Nevezis Kedainiai – Pazanga Vilnius (6:0)

== 1969 ==
Toplyga
Team Standings	GP	W	D	L	F	A	GD	P
Statybininkas Siauliai	32	20	9	3	56	17	39	49
Nevezis Kedainiai	32	20	7	5	63	26	37	47
Inkaras Kaunas	32	18	7	7	46	20	26	43
Atletas Kaunas	32	15	12	5	45	19	26	42
Statyba Panevezys	32	16	9	7	50	31	19	41
Lima Kaunas	32	14	11	7	48	29	19	39
Politechnika Kaunas	32	15	8	9	37	26	11	38
Vienybe Ukmerge	32	13	7	12	40	33	7	33
Granitas Klaipeda	32	10	10	12	26	27	-1	30
Minija Kretinga	32	10	10	12	32	36	-4	30
Ekranas Panevezys	32	11	5	16	40	49	-9	27
Pazanga Vilnius	32	7	12	13	34	49	-15	26
Banga Kaunas	32	8	9	15	27	43	-16	25
Suduva Kapsukas	32	9	5	18	26	54	-28	23
Tauras Taurage	32	6	10	16	22	42	-20	22
Elnias Siauliai	32	3	9	20	21	57	-36	15
Zalgiris N. Vilnia	32	4	6	22	23	78	-55	14

=== Winners by group ===
- Group A Zalgiris – Elfa Vilnius
- Group A Nemunas – Dainava Alytus

=== Cup ===
==== Semifinal ====
- Inkaras Kaunas – Nevezis Kedainiai (2:1)
- Vienybe Ukmerge – Granitas Klaipeda (2:1)

==== Final ====
Inkaras Kaunas – Vienybe Ukmerge (2:0) (1:1)

== 1970 ==
Toplyga
Team Standings	GP	W	D	L	F	A	GD	P
Atletas Kaunas	32	22	6	4	60	16	44	50
Politechnika Kaunas	32	19	6	7	45	28	17	44
Nevezis Kedainiai	32	16	9	7	50	26	24	41
Inkaras Kaunas	32	16	9	7	36	18	18	41
Statybininkas Siauliai	32	13	13	6	42	25	17	39
Dainava Alytus	32	15	8	9	37	30	7	38
Vienybe Ukmerge	32	14	8	10	44	35	9	36
Granitas Klaipeda	32	11	11	10	42	29	13	33
Minija Kretinga	32	12	8	12	50	35	15	32
Statyba Panevezys	32	12	8	12	27	29	-2	32
Ekranas Panevezys	32	11	7	14	29	37	-8	29
Banga Kaunas	32	7	14	11	31	30	1	28
Lima Kaunas	32	11	6	15	38	45	-7	28
Pazanga Vilnius	32	9	8	15	19	42	-23	26
Tauras Taurage	32	8	6	18	40	66	-26	22
Elfa Vilnius	32	6	6	20	22	58	-36	18
Suduva Kapsukas	32	2	3	27	14	77	-63	7

=== Winners by group ===
- Group A Zalgiris – Inzinerija Vilnius
- Group A Nemunas – Chemikas Kedainiai

=== Cup ===
==== Semifinal ====
- Nevezis Kedainiai – Dainava Alytus (2:1)
- Minija Kretinga – Politechnika Kaunas (3:1)

==== Final ====
Nevezis Kedainiai – Minija Kretinga (0:0) (3:1)

== See also ==
- Lithuanian football standings (1931–1940)
- Lithuanian football standings (1941–1950)
- Lithuanian football standings (1951–1960)
- Lithuanian football standings (1971–1980)
- Lithuanian football standings (1981–1990)

== Sources ==
- RSSF/Almantas Lahzadis
