= Lithuanian football standings (1971–1980) =

The Lithuanian football standings from 1971–1980 are listed below.

== 1971 ==
Toplyga (Aukščiausia Lyga)
Team Standings	GP	W	D	L	F	A	GD	P
Pazanga Vilnius	30	17	9	4	48	21	27	43
Granitas Klaipeda	30	15	9	6	42	22	20	39
Vienybe Ukmerge	30	14	10	6	44	19	25	38
Minija Kretinga	30	13	8	9	40	33	7	34
Atletas Kaunas	30	11	11	8	25	19	6	33
Inkaras Kaunas	30	10	12	8	30	21	9	32
Dainava Alytus	30	10	11	9	29	29	0	31
Statyba Panevezys	30	11	7	12	38	32	6	29
Statybininkas Siauliai	30	9	11	10	22	29	-7	29
Nevezis Kedainiai	30	8	12	10	25	29	-4	28
Banga Kaunas	30	8	11	11	26	33	-7	27
Ekranas Panevezys	30	6	14	10	26	36	-10	26
Chemikas Kedainiai	30	9	8	13	27	43	-16	26
Politechnika Kaunas	30	9	7	14	37	45	-8	25
Drobe Kaunas	30	5	11	14	23	38	-15	21
Inzinerija Vilnius	30	5	9	16	23	56	-33	19

=== Winners by group ===
- Group A Zalgiris – Tauras Siauliai
- Group A Nemunas – Suduva Kapsukas

=== Cup ===
==== Semifinal ====
- Pazanga Vilnius – Dainava Alytus (2:1)
- Statyba Panevezys – Elektra Mazeikiai (4:0)

==== Final ====
Pazanga Vilnius – Statyba Panevezys (1:0) (3:1)

== 1972 ==
Toplyga
Team Standings	GP	W	D	L	F	A	GD	P
Nevezis Kedainiai	28	16	7	5	45	26	19	39
Pazanga Vilnius	28	17	4	7	55	30	25	38
Dainava Alytus	28	14	7	7	35	19	16	35
Atletas Kaunas	28	12	8	8	34	24	10	32
Banga Kaunas	28	12	8	8	34	30	4	32
Statyba Panevezys	28	11	9	8	30	33	-3	31
Vienybe Ukmerge	28	11	8	9	33	26	7	30
Tauras Siauliai	28	9	12	7	30	31	-1	30
Statybininkas Siauliai	28	8	12	8	26	25	1	28
Inkaras Kaunas	28	10	7	11	27	30	-3	27
Suduva Kapsukas	28	9	7	12	32	36	-4	25
Granitas Klaipeda	28	8	8	12	35	35	0	24
Ekranas Panevezys	28	5	11	12	29	42	-13	21
Politechnika Kaunas	28	5	6	17	18	38	-20	16
Minija Kretinga	28	3	6	19	17	55	-38	12

=== Winners by group ===
- Group A Zalgiris – Elnias Siauliai
- Group A Nemunas – Chemikas Kedainiai

=== Cup ===
==== Semifinal ====
- Nevezis Kedainiai – Atmosfera Panevezys (7:1)
- Ekranas Panevezys – Statybininkas Siauliai (2:?)

==== Final ====
Nevezis Kedainiai – Ekranas Panevezys (1:1) (3:2)

== 1973 ==
Toplyga - Group Zalgiris
Team Standings	GP	W	D	L	F	A	GD	P
Pazanga Vilnius	26	17	5	4	45	18	27	39
Granitas Klaipeda	26	16	3	7	47	17	30	35
Atletas Kaunas	26	14	5	7	36	17	19	33
Ekranas Panevezys	26	14	3	9	36	28	8	31
Elektronika Vilnius	26	10	8	8	24	26	-2	28
Banga Kaunas	26	8	11	7	30	24	6	27
Tauras Siauliai	26	10	7	9	33	28	5	27
Statyba Panevezys	26	10	7	9	28	34	-6	27
Statybininkas Siauliai	26	8	7	11	19	21	-2	23
Politechnika Kaunas	26	9	5	12	21	34	-13	23
Inkaras Kaunas	26	6	10	10	23	31	-8	22
Zalgiris N. Vilnia	26	7	7	12	24	36	-12	21
KKI Kaunas	26	6	5	15	21	36	-15	17
Automobilininkas Klaipeda	26	1	9	16	19	56	-37	11

Toplyga - Group Nemunas
Team Standings	GP	W	D	L	F	A	GD	P
Nevezis Kedainiai	22	17	3	2	66	25	41	37
Dainava Alytus	22	14	6	2	48	19	29	34
Suduva Kapsukas	22	14	5	3	39	17	22	33
Vienybe Ukmerge	22	9	9	4	39	18	21	27
Atmosfera Mazeikiai	22	8	6	8	25	24	1	22
Chemikas Kedainiai	22	8	5	9	31	29	2	21
Tauras Taurage	22	7	5	10	29	38	-9	19
Cementas N. Akmene	22	6	5	11	23	43	-20	17
Minija Kretinga	22	5	6	11	27	37	-10	16
Kooperatininkas Plunge	22	5	5	12	29	45	-16	15
Sveikata Kybartai	22	5	3	14	28	58	-30	13
Mastis Telsiai	22	4	2	16	29	60	-31	10

Top Six - Finals
Team Standings	GP	W	D	L	F	A	GD	P
Nevezis Kedainiai	10	5	2	3	16	10	6	12
Granitas Klaipeda	10	5	2	3	11	7	4	12
Dainava Alytus	10	3	5	2	9	7	2	11
Atletas Kaunas	10	5	1	4	9	9	0	11
Pazanga Vilnius	10	4	2	4	5	9	-4	10
Suduva Kapsukas	10	1	2	7	6	14	-8	4

=== Final game ===
Nevezis Kedainiai – Granitas Klaipeda (3:0)

Final Scores
Team 1	Team 2	Score 1	Score 2
Vienybe Ukmerge	Ekranas Panevezys	1–2	4–0
Atmosfera Mazeikiai	Elektronika Vilnius	4–2	2–1
Banga Kaunas	Chemikas Kedainiai	3–0	1–0
Tauras Siauliai	Tauras Taurage	1–1	2–0
Statyba Panevezys	Cementas N. Akmene	1–2	3–1
Statybininkas Siauliai	Minija Kretinga	2–1	1–0
Politechnika Kaunas	Kooperatininkas Plunge	0–0	3–1
Sveikata Kybartai	Inkaras Kaunas	1–0	1–1
Zalgiris N. Vilnia	Mastis Telsiai	3–1	5–2
KKI Kaunas		+:-*	
Automobilininkas Klaipeda		+:-*	

*Note: missing score data.

=== Winners by group ===
- Group A Zalgiris – Ausra Vilnius
- Group A Nemunas – Utenis Utena

=== Cup ===
==== Semifinal ====
- Nevezis Kedainiai – Statyba Panevezys (2:0)
- Pazanga Vilnius – Vienybe Ukmerge (0:0) (5:4)

==== Final ====
Nevezis Kedainiai – Pazanga Vilnius (1:0)

== 1974 ==
Toplyga - Group Zalgiris
Team Standings	GP	W	D	L	F	A	GD	P
Tauras Siauliai	24	16	5	3	49	15	34	37
Pazanga Vilnius	24	12	7	5	35	21	14	31
Statybininkas Siauliai	24	11	8	5	38	18	20	30
Ekranas Panevezys	24	11	8	5	27	18	9	30
Atletas Kaunas	24	11	6	7	28	20	8	28
Banga Kaunas	24	10	6	8	30	21	9	26
Ausra Vilnius	24	7	9	8	23	22	1	23
Statyba Panevezys	24	5	12	7	15	22	-7	22
Elektronika Vilnius	24	7	7	10	15	27	-12	21
Inkaras Kaunas	24	6	9	9	13	25	-12	21
Sviesa Vilnius	24	5	6	13	21	34	-13	16
Politechnika Kaunas	24	6	3	15	17	43	-26	15
Granitas Klaipeda	24	3	6	15	14	39	-25	12

Toplyga - Group Nemunas
Team Standings	GP	W	D	L	F	A	GD	P
Vienybe Ukmerge	22	16	3	3	69	17	52	35
Atmosfera Mazeikiai	22	16	3	3	53	11	42	35
Dainava Alytus	22	15	4	3	44	11	33	34
Nevezis Kedainiai	22	16	1	5	39	19	20	33
Suduva Kapsukas	22	12	4	6	29	16	13	28
Sveikata Kybartai	22	10	0	12	20	35	-15	20
Kooperatininkas Plunge	22	6	7	9	29	38	-9	19
Chemikas Kedainiai	22	5	5	12	23	30	-7	15
Cementas N. Akmene	22	5	4	13	17	47	-30	14
Minija Kretinga	22	5	3	14	21	46	-25	13
Tauras Taurage	22	4	3	15	25	66	-41	11
Utenis Utena	22	3	1	18	18	52	-33	7

Top Six - Finals
Team Standings	GP	W	D	L	F	A	GD	P
Taurus Siauliai	10	7	2	1	19	6	13	16
Vienybe Ukmerge	10	6	2	2	16	10	6	14
Atmosfera Mazeikiai	10	4	2	4	17	13	4	10
Dainava Alytus	10	2	4	4	11	17	-6	8
Statybininkas Siauliai	10	2	3	5	11	19	-8	7
Pazanga Vilnius	10	1	3	6	9	18	-9	5

Final Scores
Team 1	Team 2	Score 1	Score 2
Ekranas Panevezys	Nevezis Kedainiai	1–1	3–3 (8–6)
Suduva Kapsukas	Atletas Kaunas	1–0	0–0
Banga Kaunas	Sveikata Kybartai	3–0	0–0
Ausra Vilnius	Kooperatininkas Plunge	2–3	1–0 (3–2)
Chemikas Kedainiai	Statyba Panevezys	0–1	2–0
Cementas N. Akmene	Elektronika Vilnius	2–1	1–2 (5–4)
Minija Kretinga	Inkaras Kaunas	4–2	+:-*
Tauras Taurage	Sviesa Vilnius	+:-*	
Politechnika Kaunas	Utenis Utena	4–0	+:-*
Granitas Klaipeda		+:-*	

*Note: missing score data.

=== Wins in each group ===
- Group A Zalgiris – Inzinierija Vilnius, Kelininkas Kaunas, Baltija Klaipeda
- Group A Nemunas – Banga Gargzdai

=== Cup ===
==== Semifinal ====
- Kelininkas Kaunas – Suduva Kapsukas (1:0)
- Statybininkas Siauliai – Vienybe Ukmerge (3:2)

==== Final ====
Statybininkas Siauliai – Kelininkas Kaunas (2:1)

== 1975 ==
Toplyga - Group Zalgiris
Team Standings	GP	W	D	L	F	A	GD	P
Tauras Siauliai	26	14	9	3	34	16	18	37
Ekranas Panevezys	26	14	7	5	33	24	9	35
Pazanga Vilnius	26	10	14	2	31	16	15	34
Atletas Kaunas	26	13	7	6	37	18	19	33
Kelininkas Kaunas	26	11	9	6	37	26	11	31
Politechnika Kaunas	26	12	6	8	36	29	7	30
Statybininkas Siauliai	26	9	10	7	33	24	9	28
Granitas Klaipeda	26	11	6	9	31	29	2	28
Sviesa Vilnius	26	8	8	10	25	28	-3	24
Ausra Vilnius	26	7	9	10	30	40	-10	23
Inkaras Kaunas	26	7	5	14	17	29	-12	19
Statyba Panevezys	26	5	9	12	20	39	-19	19
Banga Kaunas	26	3	7	16	12	34	-22	13
Elektronika Vilnius	26	3	4	19	12	36	-24	10

Toplyga - Group Nemunas
Team Standings	GP	W	D	L	F	A	GD	P
Dainava Alytus	22	17	3	2	50	12	38	37
Suduva Kapsukas	22	15	5	2	52	14	38	35
Nevezis Kedainiai	22	16	3	3	52	18	34	35
Kooperatininkas Plunge	22	12	4	6	38	21	17	28
Vienybe Ukmerge	22	10	7	5	44	23	21	27
Atmosfera Mazeikiai	22	8	7	7	34	25	9	23
Chemikas Kedainiai	22	8	4	10	35	41	-6	20
Tauras Taurage	22	8	2	12	32	57	-25	18
Sveikata Kybartai	22	6	3	13	29	45	-16	15
Cementas N. Akmene	22	6	1	15	23	44	-21	13
Banga Gargzdai	22	4	1	17	15	60	-45	9
Minija Kretinga	22	1	2	19	9	53	-44	4

Top Six - Finals
Team Standings	GP	W	D	L	F	A	GD	P
Dainava Alytus	10	6	4	0	12	3	9	16
Pazanga Vilnius	10	4	3	3	12	7	5	11
Suduva Kapsukas	10	5	1	4	15	10	5	11
Taurus Siauliai	10	3	4	3	7	7	0	10
Nevezis Kedainiai	10	1	4	5	8	16	-8	6
Ekranas Panevezys	10	2	2	6	7	18	-11	6

Final Scores
Team 1	Team 2	Score 1	Score 2
Atletas Kaunas	Kooperatininkas Plunge	2–3	2–0
Vienybe Ukmerge	Kelininkas Kaunas	1–0	2–1
Politechnika Kaunas	Atmosfera Mazeikiai	3–0	3–4
Statybininkas Siauliai	Chemikas Kedainiai	0–0	2–0
Granitas Klaipeda	Tauras Taurage	2–1	+:-*
Sviesa Vilnius	Sveikata Kybartai	+:-*	
Ausra Vilnius	Cementas N. Akmene	1–2	2–1 (5–4)
Inkaras Kaunas	Banga Gargzdai	3–1	0–1
Statyba Panevezys	Minija Kretinga	4–0	0–3
Banga Kaunas		+:-*	
Elektronika Vilnius		+:-*	

*Note: missing score data.

=== Wins in each group ===
- Group A Zalgiris: Elektronas Vilnius, Pluostas Kaunas, Baltija Klaipeda, Atmosfera Panevezys
- Group A Nemunas: Impulsas Telsiai, Banga Alytus, Pamarys Silute, Utenis Utena

=== Cup ===
==== Semifinal ====
- Vienybe Ukmerge – Kooperatininkas Plunge (2:0)
- Statybininkas Siauliai – Atmosfera Mazekiai (2:0)

==== Final ====
Vienybe Ukmerge – Statybininkas Siauliai (3:0)

== 1976 ==
Toplyga - Group Zalgiris
Team Standings	GP	W	D	L	F	A	GD	P
Ausra Vilnius	13	9	2	2	20	8	12	20
Kelininkas Kaunas	13	8	3	2	22	8	14	19
Pazanga Vilnius	13	7	3	3	16	8	8	17
Tauras Siauliai	13	6	5	2	23	15	8	17
Statybininkas Siauliai	13	6	3	4	16	9	7	15
Granitas Klaipeda	13	6	2	5	19	11	8	14
Statyba Panevezys	13	5	2	6	14	15	-1	12
Sviesa Vilnius	13	3	6	4	13	14	-1	12
Atletas Kaunas	13	3	5	5	12	18	-6	11
Inkaras Kaunas	13	3	5	5	11	18	-7	11
Banga Kaunas	13	3	4	6	5	10	-5	10
Ekranas Panevezys	13	4	1	8	12	25	-13	9
Elektronas Vilnius	13	3	2	8	11	21	-10	8
Politechnika Kaunas	13	3	1	9	9	23	-14	7

Toplyga - Group Nemunas
Team Standings	GP	W	D	L	F	A	GD	P
Vienybe Ukmerge	11	8	3	0	22	5	17	19
Dainava Alytus	11	8	2	1	25	9	16	18
Atmosfera Mazeikiai	11	7	3	1	26	5	21	17
Nevezis Kedainiai	11	6	3	2	17	4	13	15
Suduva Kapsukas	11	5	3	3	23	9	14	13
Sveikata Kybartai	11	5	1	5	12	7	5	11
Tauras Taurage	11	3	3	5	9	16	-7	9
Cementas N. Akmene	11	3	3	5	7	23	-16	9
Kooperatininkas Plunge	11	2	2	7	11	29	-18	6
Minija Kretinga	11	2	2	7	6	16	-10	6
Banga Gargzdai	11	2	1	8	7	21	-14	5
Impulsas Telsiai	11	1	2	8	5	26	-21	4

Top Eight - Finals
Team Standings	GP	W	D	L	F	A	GD	P
Atmosfera Mazeikiai	14	8	3	3	27	14	13	19
Vienybe Ukmerge	14	7	3	4	20	15	5	17
Pazanga Vilnius	14	7	3	4	15	17	-2	17
Dainava Alytus	14	6	4	4	17	12	5	16
Kelininkas Kaunas	14	7	1	6	21	14	7	15
Nevezis Kedainiai	14	6	3	5	24	17	7	15
Taurus Siauliai	14	4	4	6	19	25	-6	12
Ausra Vilnius	14	0	1	13	6	35	-29	1

Group Zalgiris - Final
Team Standings	GP	W	D	L	F	A	GD	P
Statybininkas Siauliai	22	12	4	6	32	17	15	28
Granitas Klaipeda	22	10	6	6	31	16	15	26
Inkaras Kaunas	22	9	6	7	28	28	0	24
Atletas Kaunas	22	8	8	6	25	26	-1	24
Statyba Panevezys	22	8	3	11	31	31	0	19
Sviesa Vilnius	22	5	9	8	22	25	-3	19
Banga Kaunas	22	7	5	10	16	20	-4	19
Ekranas Panevezys	22	6	4	12	20	42	-22	16
Elektronas Vilnius	22	5	3	14	17	35	-18	13
Politechnika Kaunas	22	4	3	15	21	45	-24	11

Group Nemunas - Final
Team Standings	GP	W	D	L	F	A	GD	P
Suduva Kapsukas	25	12	5	8	47	22	25	29
Sveikata Kybartai	25	11	4	10	33	26	7	26
Tauras Taurage	25	10	6	9	36	38	-2	26
Cementas N. Akmene	25	7	7	11	19	43	-24	21
Banga Gargzdai	25	9	2	14	27	38	-11	20
Impulsas Telsiai	25	7	6	12	32	46	-14	20
Minija Kretinga	25	6	6	13	21	40	-19	18
Kooperatininkas Plunge	25	5	5	15	30	59	-29	15

=== Wins in each group ===
- Group A Zalgiris: Kibirkstis Vilnius, Pilenai Kaunas, Sirijus Klaipeda, Elnias Siauliai, KN Panevezys
- Group A Nemunas: Automobilininkas Jonava, Tarybu Lietuva Kalvarija, Montuotojas Mazeikiai, Lokomotyvas Radviliskis

=== Cup ===
==== Semifinal ====
- Kelininkas Kaunas – Tauras Siauliai (2:1)
- Suduva Kapsukas – Statybininkas Siauliai (1:0)

==== Final ====
Kelininkas Kaunas – Suduva Kapsukas (2:1)

== 1977 ==
Toplyga - Group Zalgiris
Team Standings	GP	W	D	L	F	A	GD	P
Kelininkas Kaunas	14	8	6	0	34	9	25	22
Statybininkas Siauliai	14	7	6	1	19	8	11	20
Tauras Siauliai	14	8	4	2	20	11	9	20
Banga Kaunas	14	7	6	1	18	12	6	20
Sviesa Vilnius	14	7	5	2	17	8	9	19
Granitas Klaipeda	14	6	6	2	20	9	11	18
Atletas Kaunas	14	7	2	5	20	20	0	16
Inkaras Kaunas	14	5	5	4	15	14	1	15
Pazanga Vilnius	14	4	5	5	14	14	0	13
Statyba Panevezys	14	4	2	8	24	27	-3	10
Ausra Vilnius	14	2	6	6	10	16	-6	10
Politechnika Kaunas	14	1	8	5	8	17	-9	10
Ekranas Panevezys	14	0	8	6	9	21	-12	8
Kibirkstis Vilnius	14	1	3	10	7	34	-27	5
Zvejas Klaipeda	14	1	2	11	7	22	-15	4

Toplyga - Group Nemunas
Team Standings	GP	W	D	L	F	A	GD	P
Vienybe Ukmerge	11	10	1	0	37	7	30	21
Atmosfera Mazeikiai	11	8	3	0	22	3	19	19
Nevezis Kedainiai	11	8	2	1	26	4	22	18
Dainava Alytus	11	7	2	2	21	5	16	16
Suduva Kapsukas	11	5	2	4	19	10	9	12
Kooperatininkas Plunge	11	5	2	4	20	16	4	12
Sveikata Kybartai	11	4	1	6	17	27	-10	9
Automobilininkas Jonava	11	4	0	7	12	40	-28	8
Minija Kretinga	11	3	1	7	14	26	-12	7
Impulsas Telsiai	11	2	0	9	12	25	-13	4
Tauras Taurage	11	1	2	8	10	25	-15	4
Banga Gargzdai	11	0	2	9	3	25	-22	2

Top Eight - Finals
Team Standings	GP	W	D	L	F	A	GD	P
Statybininkas Siauliai	14	9	3	2	17	10	7	21
Kelininkas Kaunas	14	7	4	3	26	9	17	18
Atmosfera Mazeikiai	14	7	4	3	19	15	4	18
Dainava Alytus	14	7	3	4	19	12	7	17
Nevezis Kedainiai	14	6	2	6	18	14	4	14
Vienybe Ukmerge	14	6	1	7	28	24	4	13
Taurus Siauliai	14	3	0	11	17	35	-18	6
Banga Kaunas	14	2	1	11	7	32	-25	5

Group Zalgiris - Final
Team Standings	GP	W	D	L	F	A	GD	P
Granitas Klaipeda	24	12	10	2	32	14	18	34
Sviesa Vilnius	24	13	7	4	31	13	18	33
Atletas Kaunas	24	13	5	6	39	30	9	31
Pazanga Vilnius	24	10	8	6	27	19	8	28
Politechnika Kaunas	24	7	11	6	19	23	-4	25
Inkaras Kaunas	24	8	6	10	24	34	-10	22
Statyba Panevezys	24	8	4	12	42	40	2	20
Ausra Vilnius	24	3	9	12	14	26	-12	15
Ekranas Panevezys	24	2	10	12	18	39	-21	14
Kibirkstis Vilnius	24	2	5	17	13	48	-35	9
Zvejas Klaipeda	24	1	5	18	13	37	-24	7

Group Nemunas - Final
Team Standings	GP	W	D	L	F	A	GD	P
Suduva Kapsukas	25	15	6	4	59	22	37	36
Kooperatininkas Plunge	25	12	5	8	45	36	9	29
Minija Kretinga	25	10	4	11	35	47	-12	24
Sveikata Kybartai	25	8	5	12	38	43	-5	21
Automobilininkas Jonava	25	8	3	14	27	62	-35	19
Impulsas Telsiai	25	6	2	17	35	52	-17	14
Tauras Taurage	25	5	4	16	31	59	-28	14
Banga Gargzdai	25	5	3	17	19	52	-33	13

=== Wins in each group ===
- Group A Zalgiris: Maistas Kaunas, Zalgiris N.Vilnia, Syrius Klaipeda, Elnias Siauliai, ISM Panevezys
- Group A Nemunas: Utenis Utena, Tarybu Lietuva Kalvarija, Mituva Jurbarkas, Keramikas Daugeliai

=== Cup ===
==== Semifinal ====
- Kelininkas Kaunas – Pazanga Vilnius (3:2)
- Granitas Klaipeda – Utenis Utena (1:0)

==== Final ====
Granitas Klaipeda – Kelininkas Kaunas (2:0)

== 1978 ==
Toplyga
Team Standings	GP	W	D	L	F	A	GD	P
Granitas Klaipeda	30	15	12	3	45	19	26	42
Statybininkas Siauliai	30	14	11	5	31	16	15	39
Banga Kaunas	30	15	8	7	43	26	17	38
Kelininkas Kaunas	30	14	9	7	41	19	22	37
Atmosfera Mazeikiai	30	13	9	8	33	21	12	35
Tauras Siauliai	30	13	6	11	30	28	2	32
Sviesa Vilnius	30	8	14	8	27	25	2	30
Politechnika Kaunas	30	9	11	10	32	32	0	29
Pazanga Vilnius	30	8	12	10	30	31	-1	28
Dainava Alytus	30	10	8	12	33	39	-6	28
Kooperatininkas Plunge	30	11	5	14	32	44	-12	27
Nevezis Kedainiai	30	7	12	11	32	36	-4	26
Ekranas Panevezys	30	7	10	13	33	41	-8	24
Vienybe Ukmerge	30	9	6	15	33	47	-14	24
Atletas Kaunas	30	8	7	15	33	51	-18	23
Suduva Kapsukas	30	4	10	16	18	51	-33	18

=== Winners by group ===
- Group A Zalgiris: Ausra Vilnius
- Group A Nemunas: Utenis Utena

=== Cup ===
==== Semifinal ====
- Kelininkas Kaunas – Statyba Jonava (3:1)
- Kooperatininkas Plunge – Politechnika Kaunas (2:1)

==== Final ====
Kelininkas Kaunas – Kooperatininkas Plunge (2:0)

== 1979 ==
Toplyga
Team Standings	GP	W	D	L	F	A	GD	P
Atmosfera Mazeikiai	32	22	6	4	46	15	31	50
Kelininkas Kaunas	32	20	9	3	74	35	39	49
Nevezis Kedainiai	32	15	10	7	49	28	21	40
Tauras Siauliai	32	15	8	9	47	32	15	38
Statybininkas Siauliai	32	13	11	8	37	23	14	37
Atletas Kaunas	32	11	13	8	33	28	5	35
Dainava Alytus	32	12	10	10	39	38	1	34
Politechnika Kaunas	32	11	10	11	43	42	1	32
Pazanga Vilnius	32	10	11	11	38	38	0	31
Vienybe Ukmerge	32	10	11	11	30	34	-4	31
Granitas Klaipeda	32	9	9	14	43	43	0	27
Utenis Utena	32	9	9	14	35	45	-10	27
Ausra Vilnius	32	9	9	14	22	33	-11	27
Banga Kaunas	32	9	9	14	29	46	-17	27
Ekranas Panevezys	32	6	10	16	29	56	-27	22
Sviesa Vilnius	32	7	7	18	33	52	-19	21
Kooperatininkas Plunge	32	5	6	21	30	69	-39	16

=== Wins by group ===
- Group A Zalgiris: Suduva Kapsukas
- Group A Nemunas: Statyba Jonava

=== Cup ===
==== Semifinal ====
- Kelininkas Kaunas – Pazanga Vilnius (3:0)
- Atmosfera Mazeikiai – Vienybe Ukmerge (2:0)

==== Final ====
Kelininkas Kaunas – Atmosfera Mazeikiai (1:0)

== 1980 ==
Toplyga
Team Standings	GP	W	D	L	F	A	GD	P
Granitas Klaipeda	34	20	10	4	67	31	36	50
Tauras Siauliai	34	19	10	5	48	21	27	48
Politechnika Kaunas	34	18	10	6	36	21	15	46
Atmosfera Mazeikiai	34	16	11	7	39	24	15	43
Kelininkas Kaunas	34	14	12	8	49	36	13	40
Statybininkas Siauliai	34	12	14	8	41	28	13	38
Pazanga Vilnius	34	14	7	13	39	31	8	35
Nevezis Kedainiai	34	11	10	13	42	44	-2	32
Utenis Utena	34	11	9	14	39	35	4	31
Jaunimas Vilnius	34	9	13	12	40	42	-2	31
Statyba Jonava	34	12	7	15	44	48	-4	31
Ekranas Panevezys	34	12	7	15	36	43	-7	31
Dainava Alytus	34	9	12	13	37	46	-9	30
Vienybe Ukmerge	34	7	13	14	38	52	-14	27
Atletas Kaunas	34	7	12	15	32	44	-12	26
Banga Kaunas	34	7	12	15	31	49	-18	26
Ausra Vilnius	34	10	5	19	29	53	-25	25
Suduva Kapsukas	34	7	8	19	34	72	-38	22

=== Promotion ===
- Inkaras Kaunas
- Sviesa Vilnius
- Sveikata Kybartai

=== Cup ===
==== Semifinal ====
- Kelininkas Kaunas – Nevezis Kedainiai (3:1)
- Banga Kaunas – Granitas Klaipeda (2:0)

==== Final ====
Kelininkas Kaunas – Banga Kaunas (3:1)

== See also ==
- Lithuanian football standings (1931–1940)
- Lithuanian football standings (1941–1950)
- Lithuanian football standings (1951–1960)
- Lithuanian football standings (1961–1970)
- Lithuanian football standings (1981–1990)

== Sources ==
- RSSF/Almantas Lahzadis
