= Bendoriai =

- Village
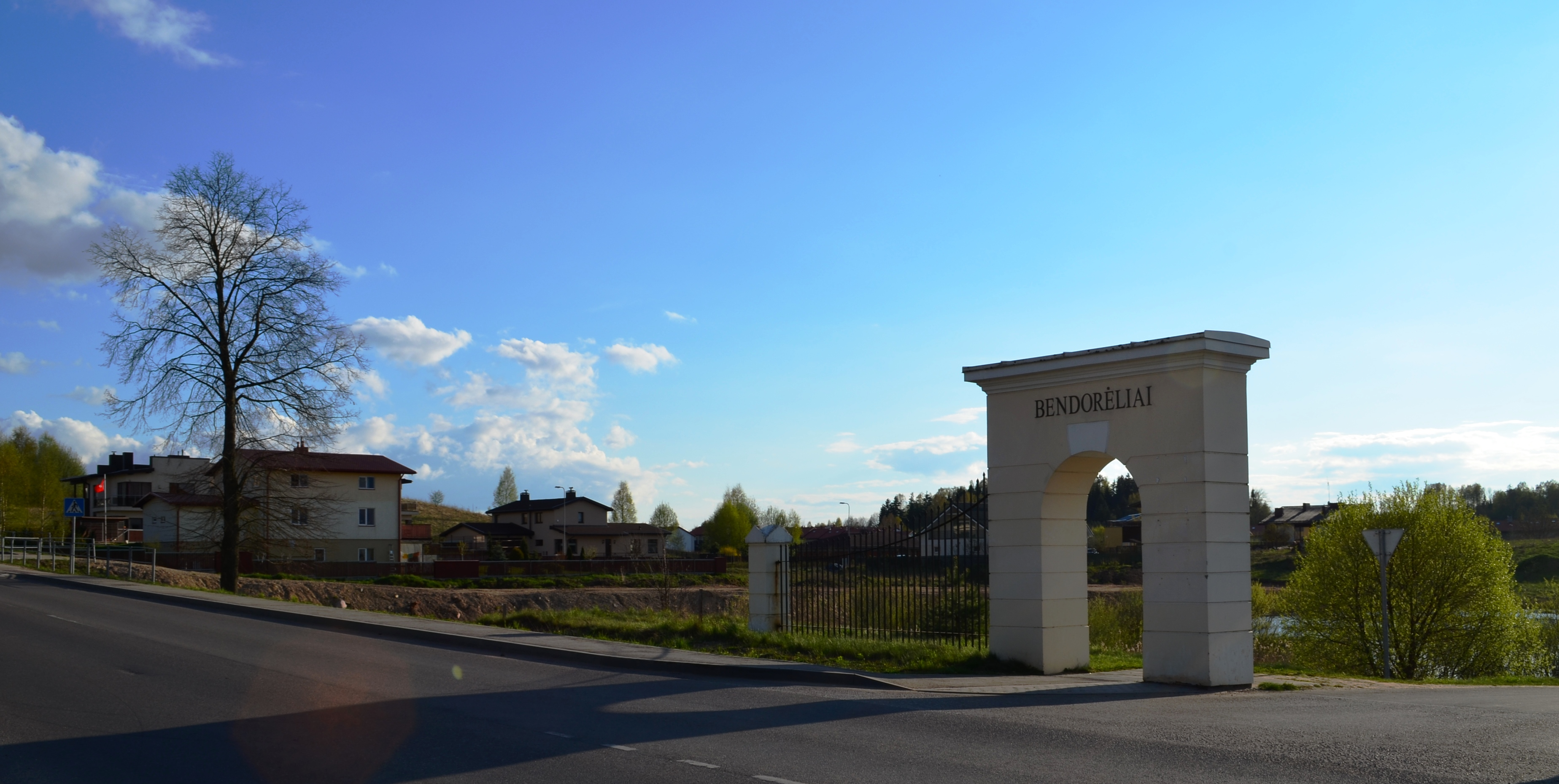
- The arc of nearby Bendorėliai

- Location of Bendoriai
- Coordinates: 54°47′46″N 25°11′53″E
- Country: Lithuania
- County: Vilnius County
- Municipality: Vilnius District Municipality
- Eldership: Avižieniai Eldership

Population (2021)
  - Total: 943
- Time zone: UTC+2 (EET)
  - Summer (DST): UTC+3 (EEST)

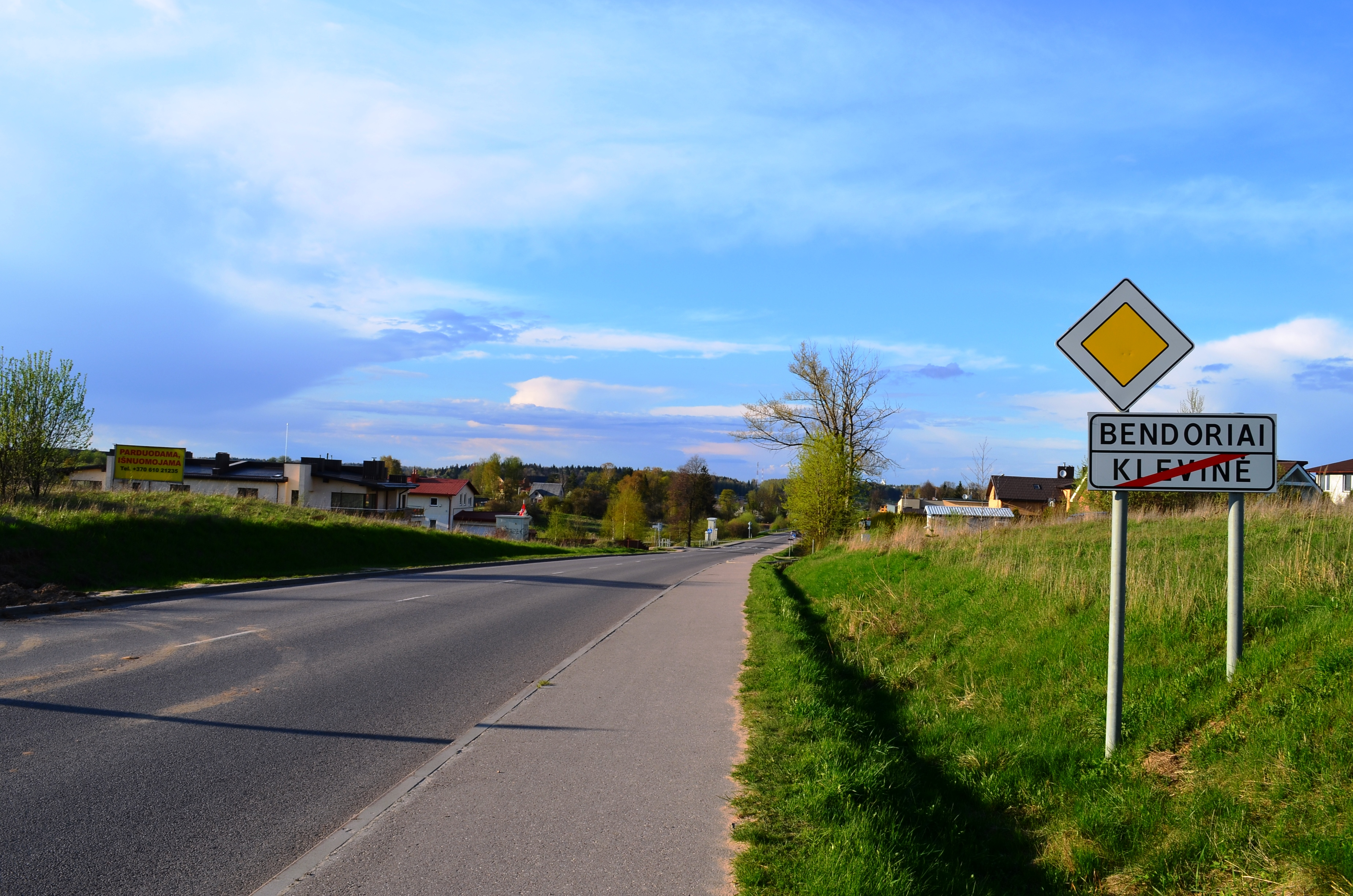
Bendoriai and Klevinė villages are interfused

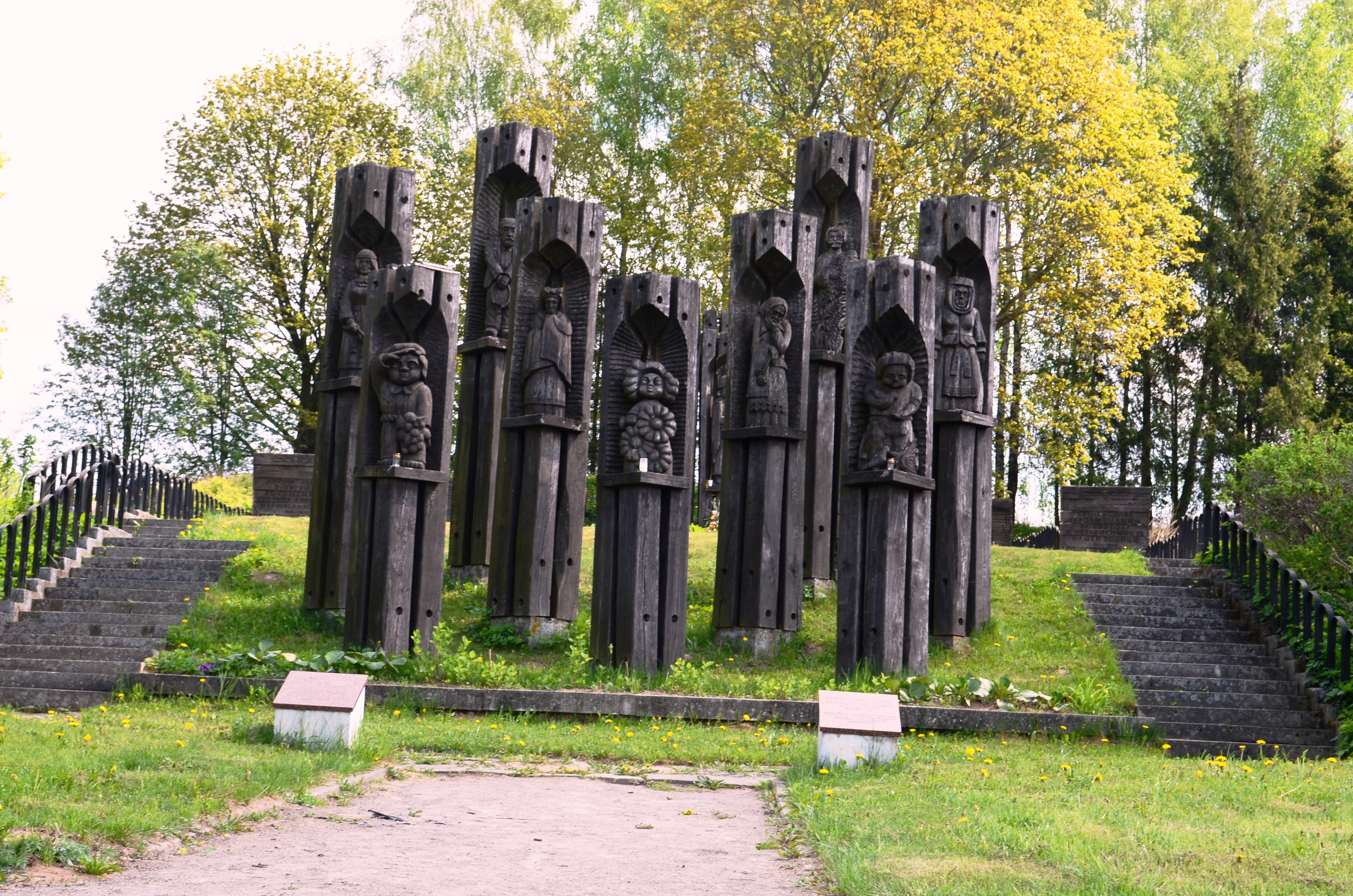
Wooden memorial for Soviet soldiers

Bendoriai is an old village in Avižieniai Eldership, Vilnius District Municipality, Lithuania. It is located just north of Vilnius, on the old road Vilnius–Ukmergė, intergrown with Klevinė. At the 2021 census, the village had a population of 943, an increase compared to 2011 census, when 764 inhabitants were counted. That was 345% increase compared to 1989 census which recorded the population of 212 inhabitants. The only in Lithuania wooden memorial for Soviet soldiers is situated in Bendoriai. There is a horse farm in the village. Bendoriai belongs to the suburban belt of Vilnius, which faces unprecedented growth during the last 20 years. New houses are being built in the village for newcomer residents from Vilnius. Vilnius city bus number 87 connects the area with the capital city.
