= Bukiškis =

- Village
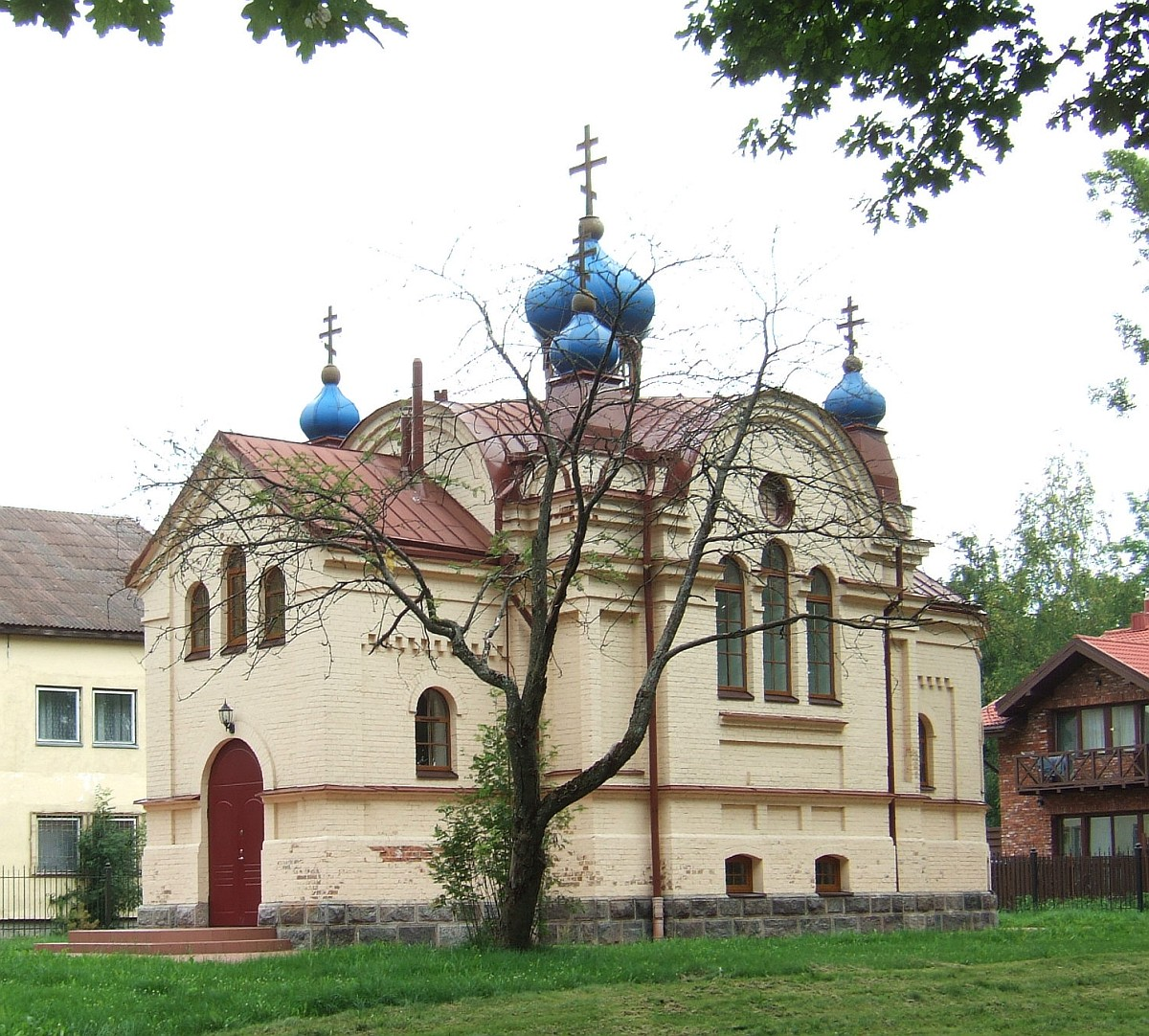
- Orthodox church in Bukiškės

- Location of Bukiškis
- Coordinates: 54°45′40″N 25°12′29″E
- Country: Lithuania
- County: Vilnius County
- Municipality: Vilnius District Municipality
- Eldership: Avižieniai Eldership

Population (2021)
  - Total: 1,154
- Time zone: UTC+2 (EET)
  - Summer (DST): UTC+3 (EEST)

Bukiškis (or Bukiškės) is a village in Avižieniai Eldership, Vilnius District Municipality, Lithuania. According to the 2021 census it had population of 1,154, an increase from 922 recorded in the 2011 census, from 822 in 2001, and from 930 in 1989.

== History ==
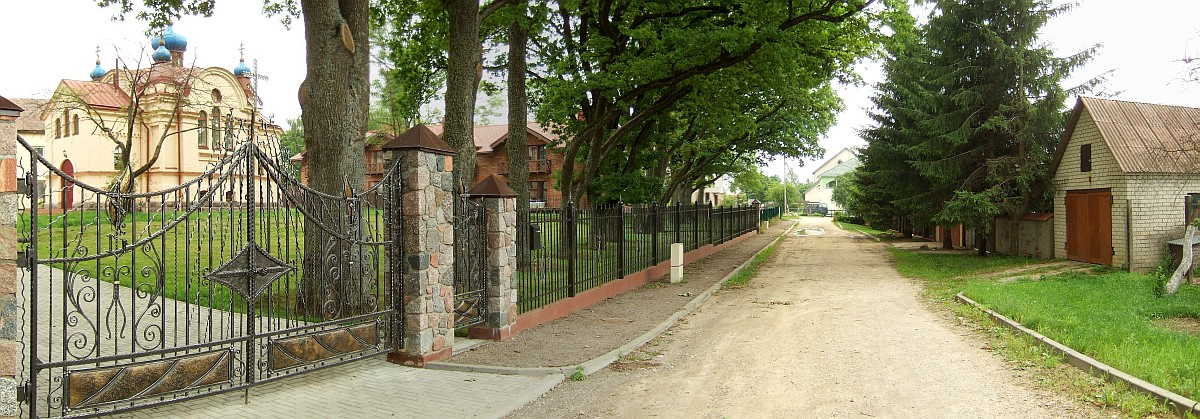
A street in Bukiškis

The name Bukiškis or Bukiškės is derived from Lithuanian surnames Bukas, Bukauskas, Bukis, Bukys or Bukevičius. The original name of the village – Gedvydžiai, however, bears a possible connection to Gedvydas, a Lithuanian medieval duke, whose patrimonial lands could be situated somewhere in the environs of the present day Bukiškis.

Bukiškis manor belonged to Radziwiłł family, but after the January Uprising of 1863, the property was confiscated by the Russian administration and transferred to Russian general Alexander Bozherianov from Novgorod, who suppressed the aforementioned uprising. Trying to convert the local Catholics to Russian Orthodox faith, Bozherianov built an Orthodox church in Bukiškis.

During the Soviet rule, an agricultural school was opened in Bukiškis. In the beginning of the XXI century, because of the convenient location near the capital, there are a lot of construction works in and around Bukiškis and the number of inhabitants is steadily growing.
