= Avižieniai Eldership =

Avižieniai Eldership Avižienių seniūnija
- Eldership
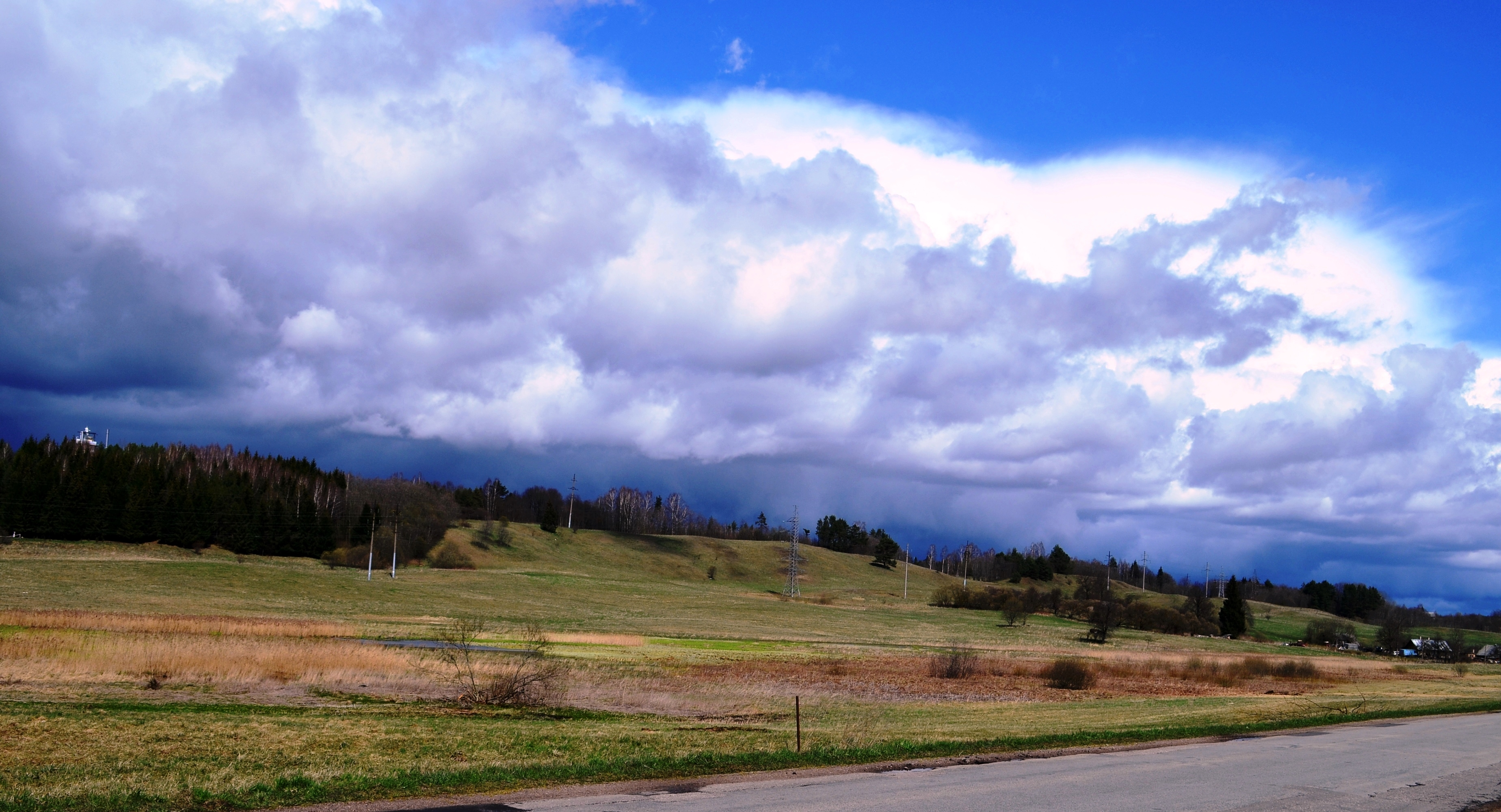
- Riešė Upland crest near Mažoji Riešė

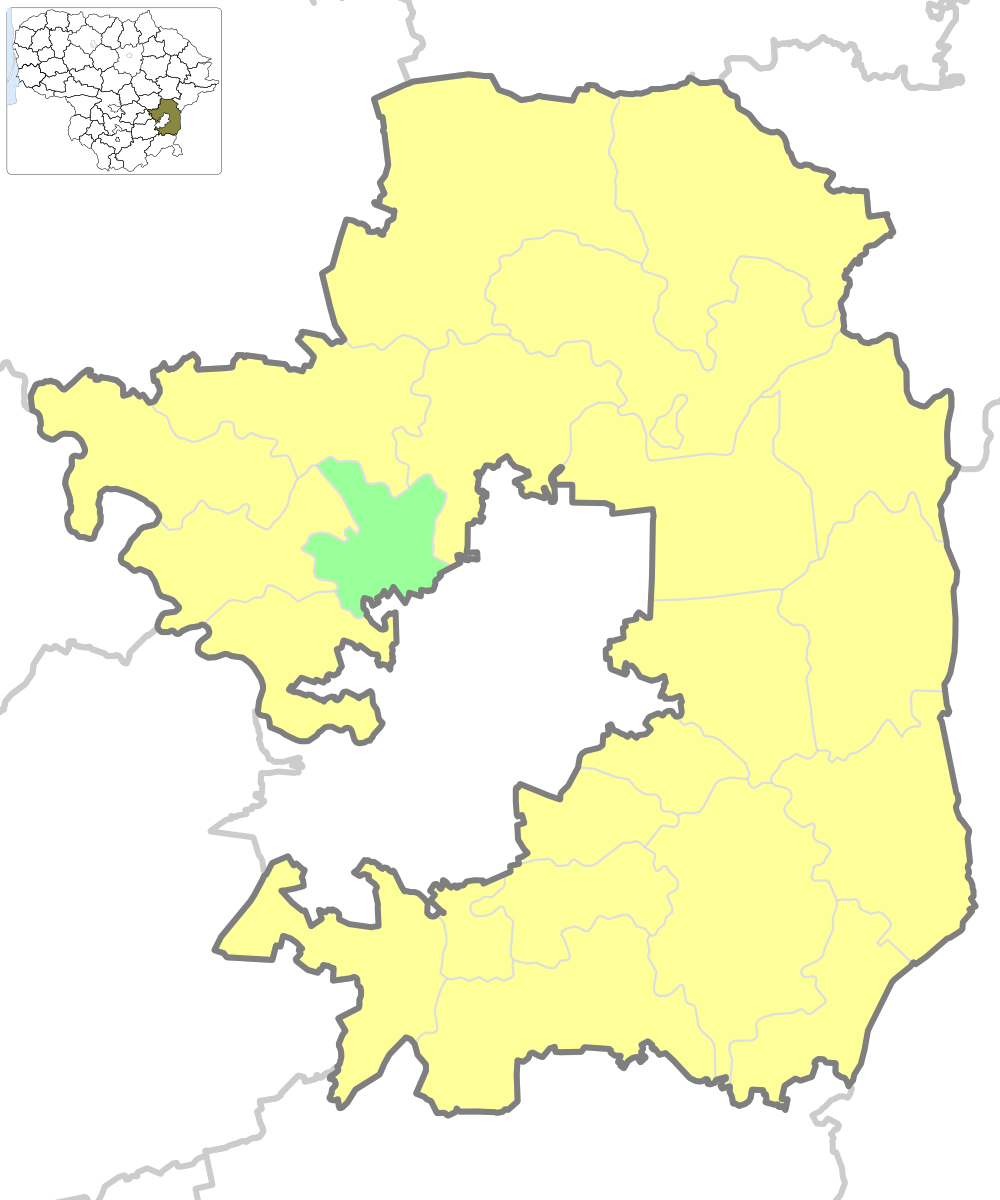
- Location of Avižieniai Eldership
- Country: Lithuania
- Ethnographic region: Dzūkija
- County: Vilnius County
- Municipality: Vilnius District Municipality
- Administrative centre: Avižieniai

Government
  - Elder: Michail Bortkevič

Area
  - Total: 52.08 km^{2} (20.11 sq mi)

Population
  - Total: 11,598
  - Density: 222.7/km^{2} (576.8/sq mi)
- Time zone: UTC+2 (EET)
  - Summer (DST): UTC+3 (EEST)
- Website: https://www.vrsa.lt

Avižieniai Eldership (Lithuanian: Avižienių seniūnija) is an eldership in Lithuania, located in Vilnius District Municipality, northwest of Vilnius. It is the most populous eldership in the municipality.

== Geography ==
The eldership has a hillfort with a cultural layer dated to the beginning of 1st millennium A.D. The landscape is dominated by rolling hills in the Riešė Upland. Many small wooded areas and swamps, but the landscape is undergoing rapid change due to suburbanization and its proximity to the city. Notable rivers include Riešė and Čekonė, and there are several small lakes, such as Gilužis, Ežeraitis, Notiškis and Varlinka.

== History ==
Avižieniai were known since the Interwar for their gardens. In the 19th century, an orthodox church was built in Bukiškis. It was damaged during World War II, and only ruins and the basement remain, and are known to have the buried corpses of a general. The church rebuilding project was initiated in 1990, and the church was rebuilt in 2007.

== Coat of arms ==
Coat of arms for Avižieniai was created in April of 2023 and is awaiting approbation. It depicts oats as Avižieniai is from Lithuanian – aviža (oat).

== Populated places ==
There are 27 villages located within the eldership, the largest of which areAvižieniai, Bukiškis, Riešė (of which only half of the village is located in the eldership, the other half belongs to Riešė Eldership), Bendoriai and Klevinė.

== Notable locations ==
- Bukiškės Orthodox Church of Patron Mother of God
- Avižieniai hillfort
- Mažoji Riešė hillfort
- Pikutiškės/Švedai hillfort
- Aukštieji Rusokai tumulus
- Galinė Manor with preserved palace and farmhouses
- Kalno Riešė Manor farmhouse fragments near Riešė
- Tarandė old cemetery
- World War II Soviet soldier burial place in Bendoriai

== Ethnic composition ==
According to 2021 census, out of 10,867 persons of the eldership:

- Lithuanians - 70.9% (7704)
- Poles - 18.8% (2043)
- Russians - 5.1% (559)
- Belarusians - 1.4% (157)
- Number of inhabitants: 10867

According to 2011 National Census data, the ethnic composition is as follows:

- Lithuanians - 65.0%
- Poles - 24.4%
- Russians - 5.6%
- Number of inhabitants: 7509

== Gallery ==
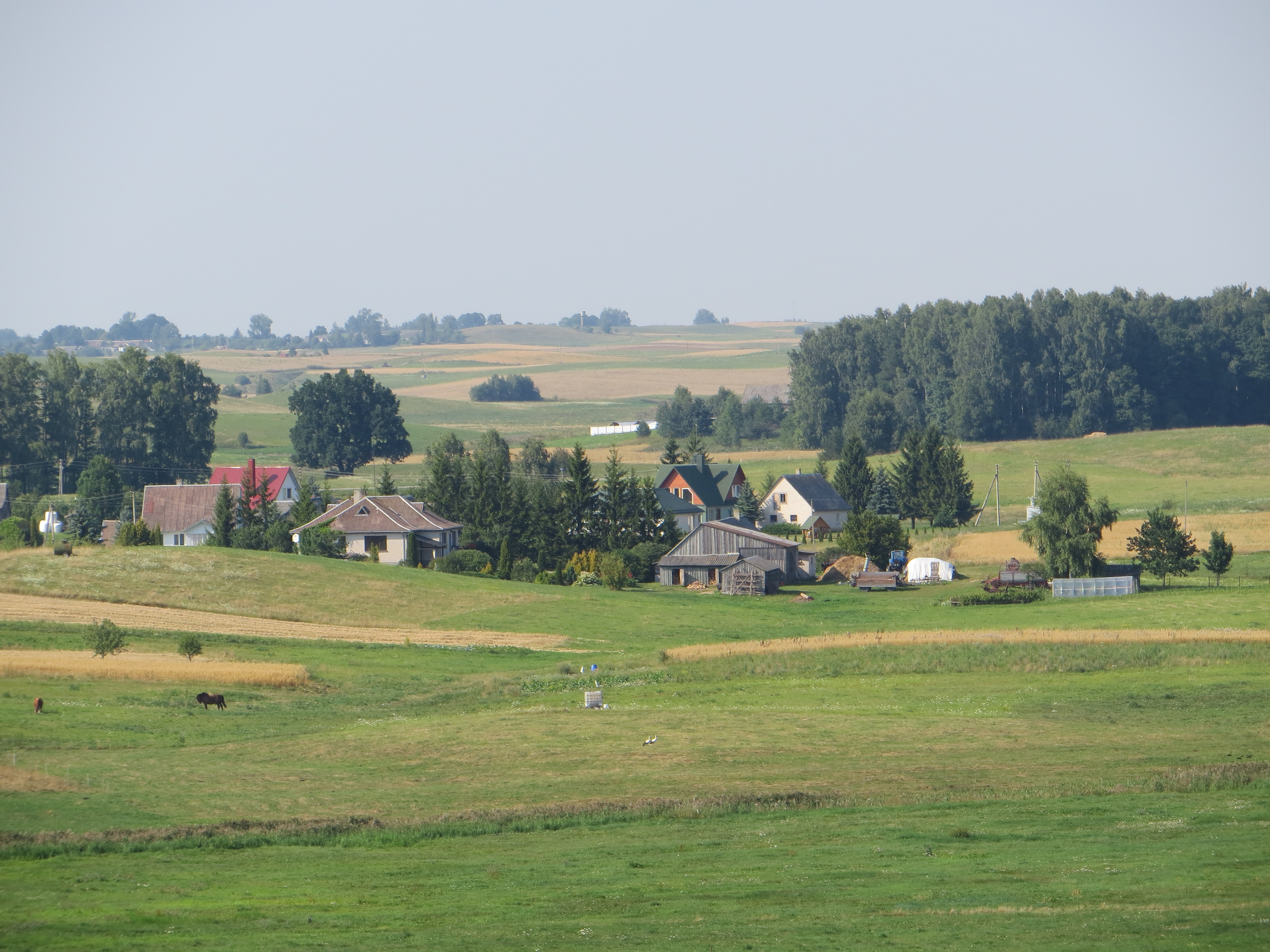
Avižieniai

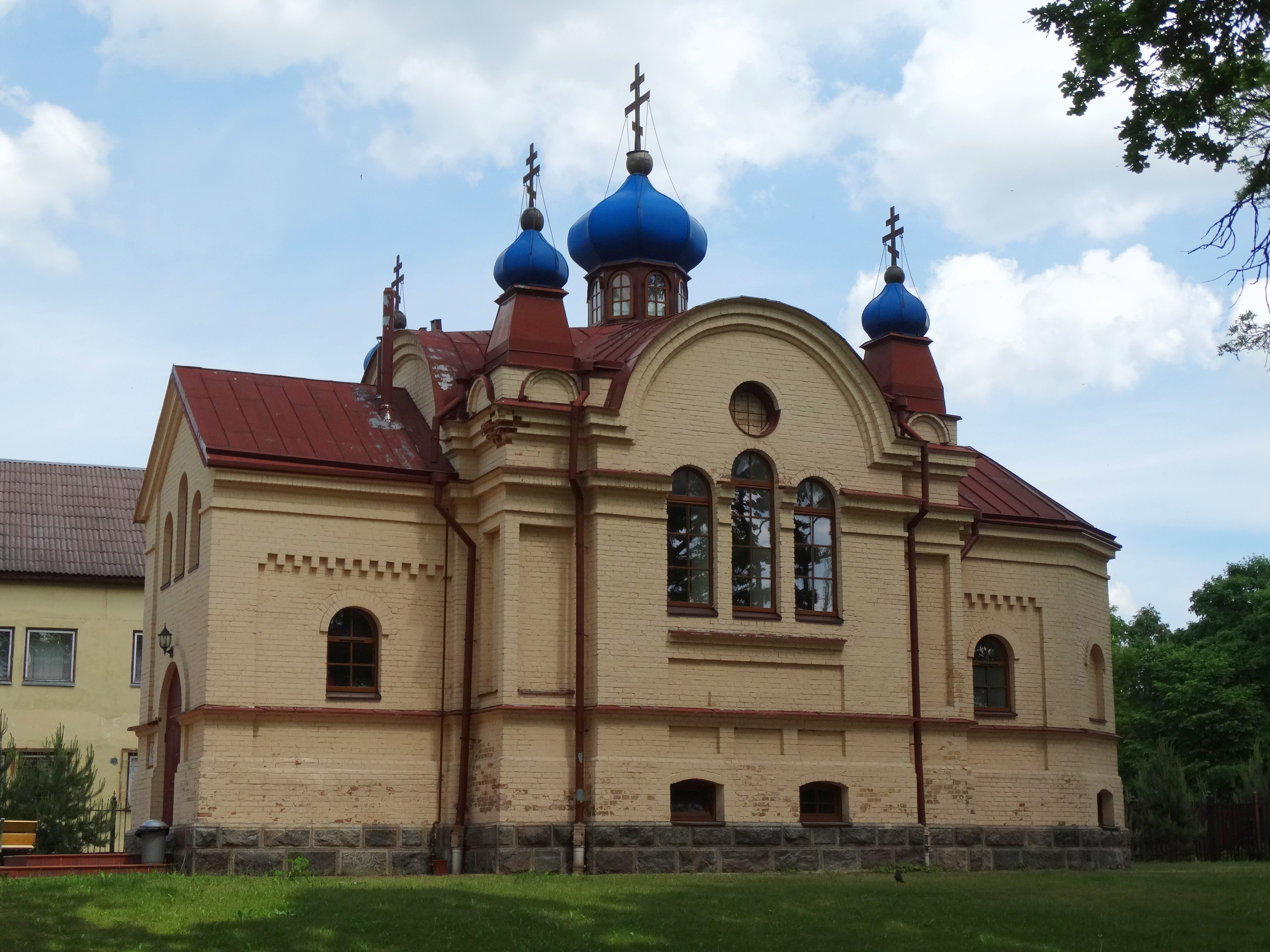
Orthodox Church of Guardian Mother of God in Bukiškis

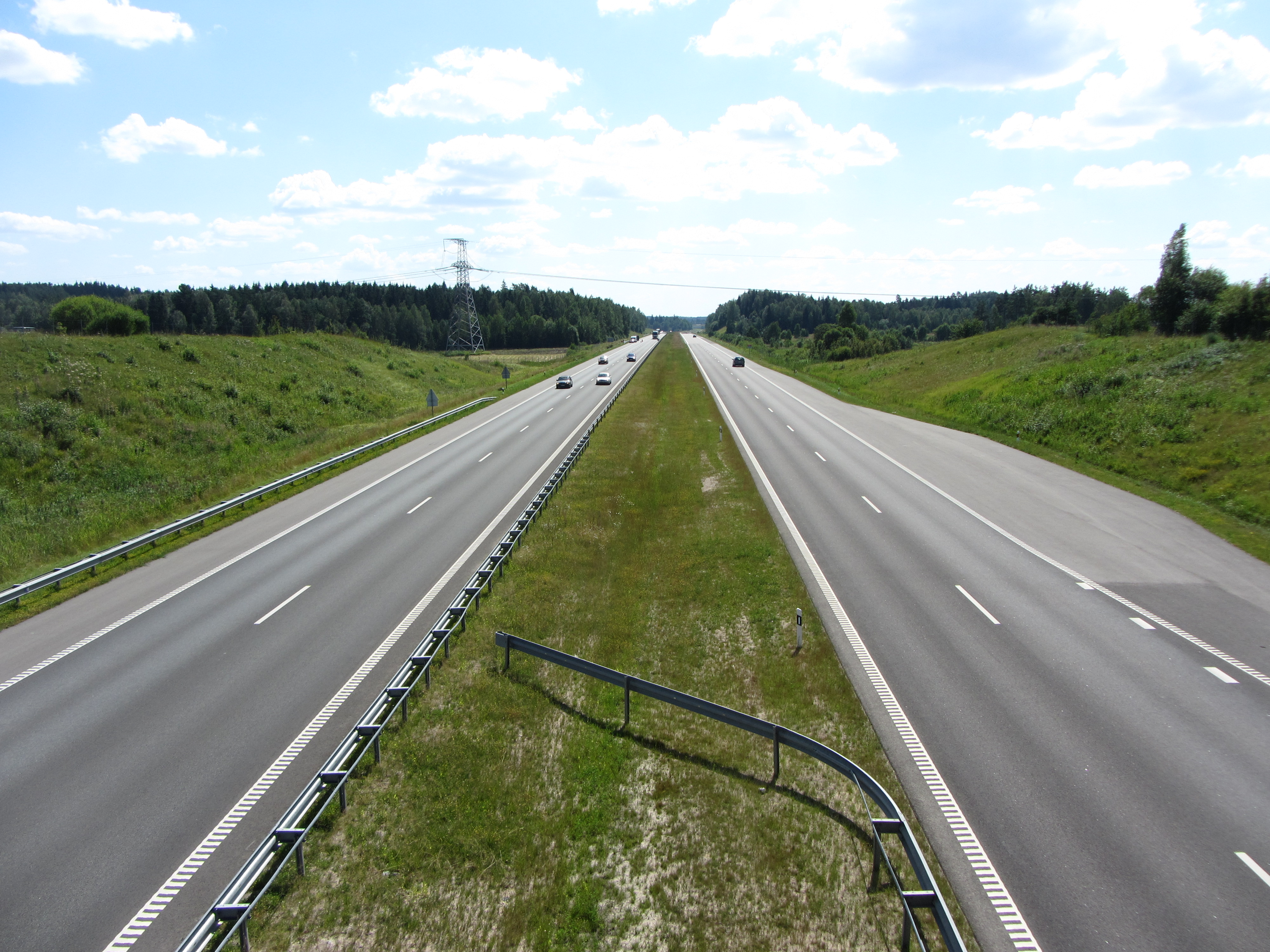
Highway A2 crosses the eldership

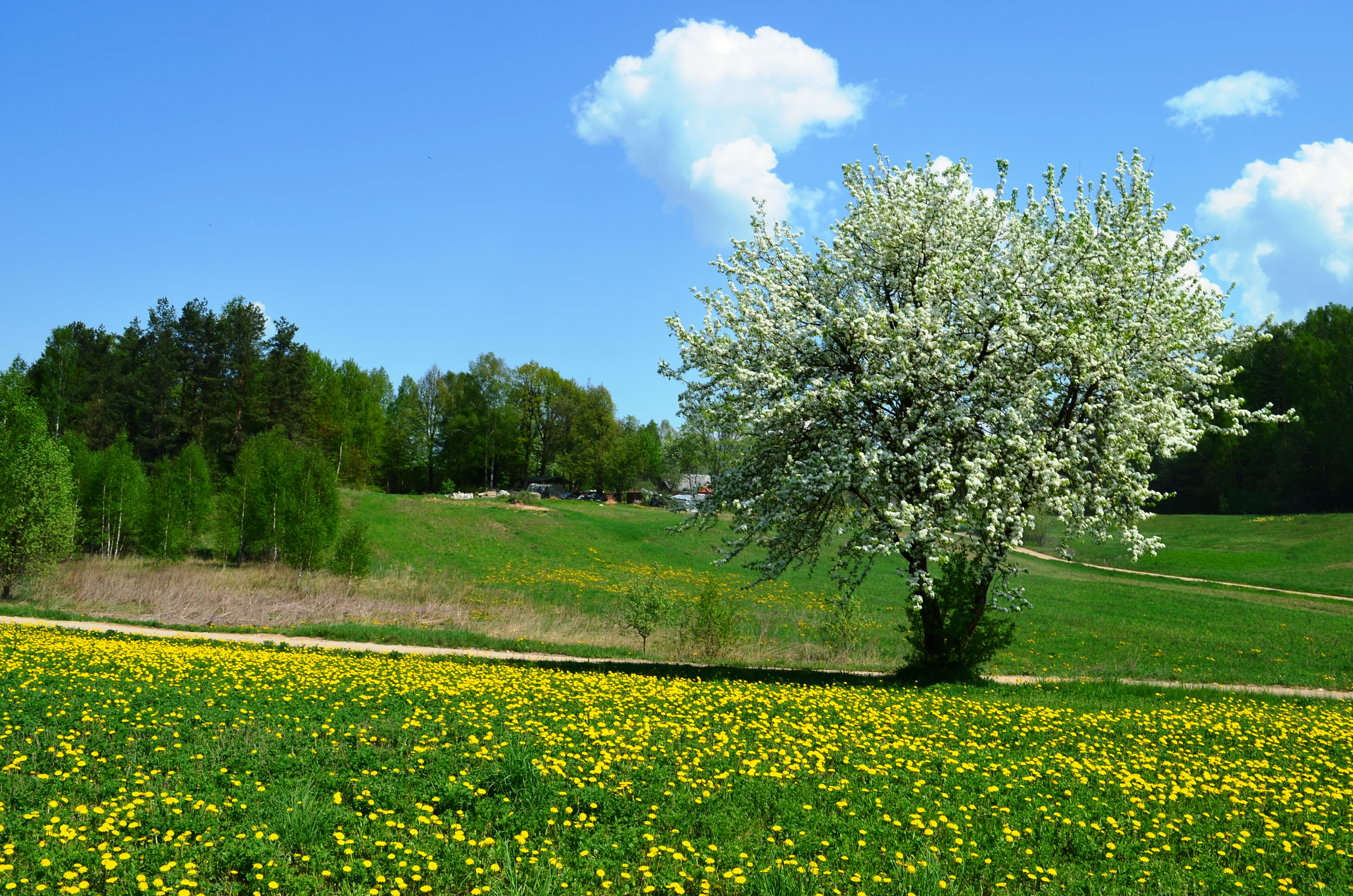
Landscape near Bajorai
