= Avižieniai =

- Village
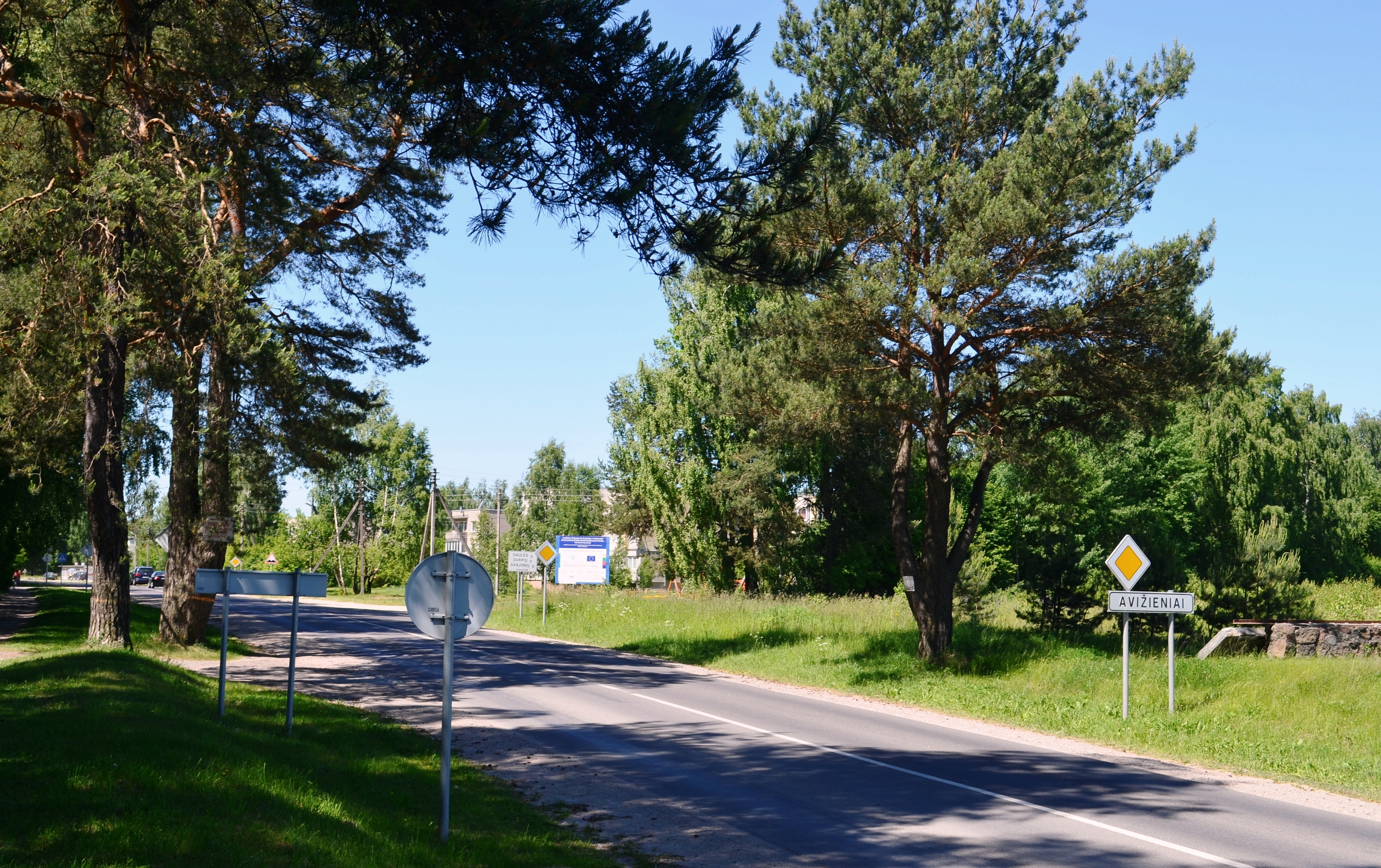
- Entrance to Avižieniai

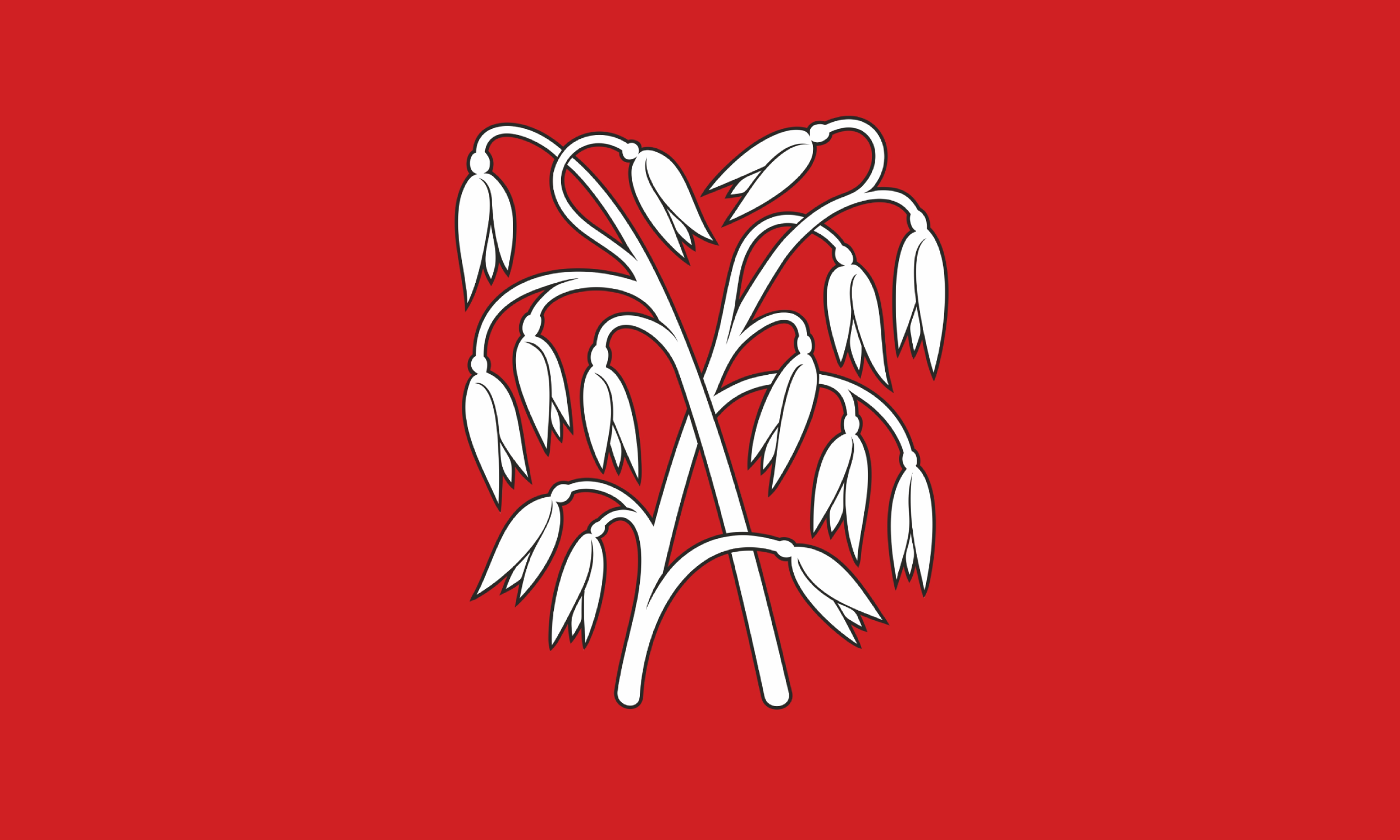
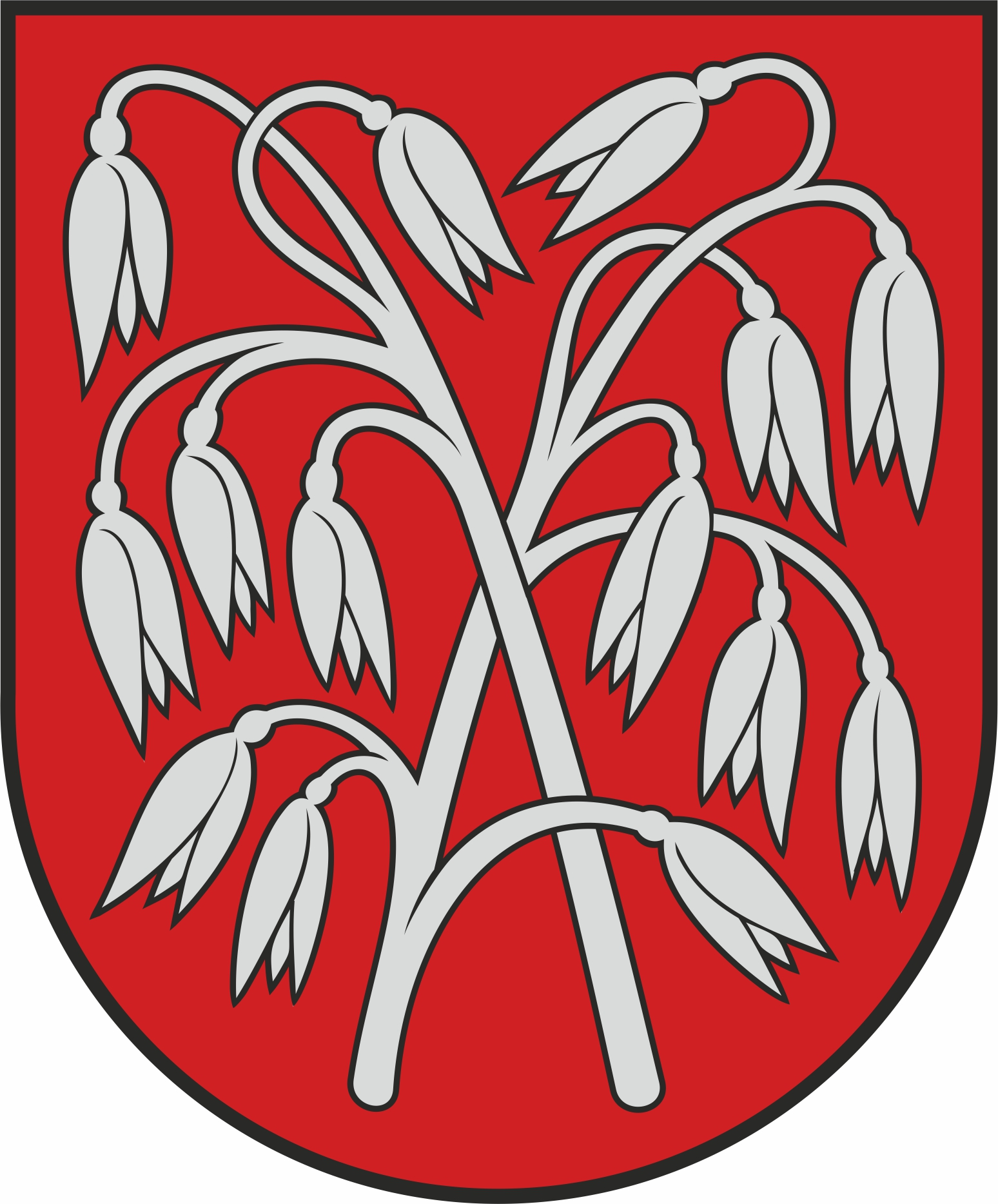
- Flag Coat of arms

- Location of Avižieniai
- Coordinates: 54°45′50″N 25°10′59″E
- Country: Lithuania
- County: Vilnius County
- Municipality: Vilnius District Municipality
- Eldership: Avižieniai Eldership

Population (2011)
  - Total: 2,125
- Time zone: UTC+2 (EET)
  - Summer (DST): UTC+3 (EEST)

Avižieniai [ɐvʲɪˈʑɪeˑnʲɛɪ̯ˑ] is a town in Vilnius District Municipality, Lithuania, 1 kilometre (0.62 mi) west of the A2 Vilnius-Panevėžys highway. The village had a population of 2,125 as of 2011, which grew to 2,318 inhabitants in 2021 (according to the national census results) and is a centre of Avižieniai Eldership. During the Soviet period, a gardening farm (specialized kolkhoz) was formed in Avižieniai, which territorially also covered what is now Fabijoniškės and Pašilaičiai microdistricts in Vilnius. Avižieniai is famous for its manufacturing: motor vehicle bus manufacturer – ALTAS komercinis transportas with more than 200 employees, smaller steel furniture factory and other industry.
