= Riešė =

- Village
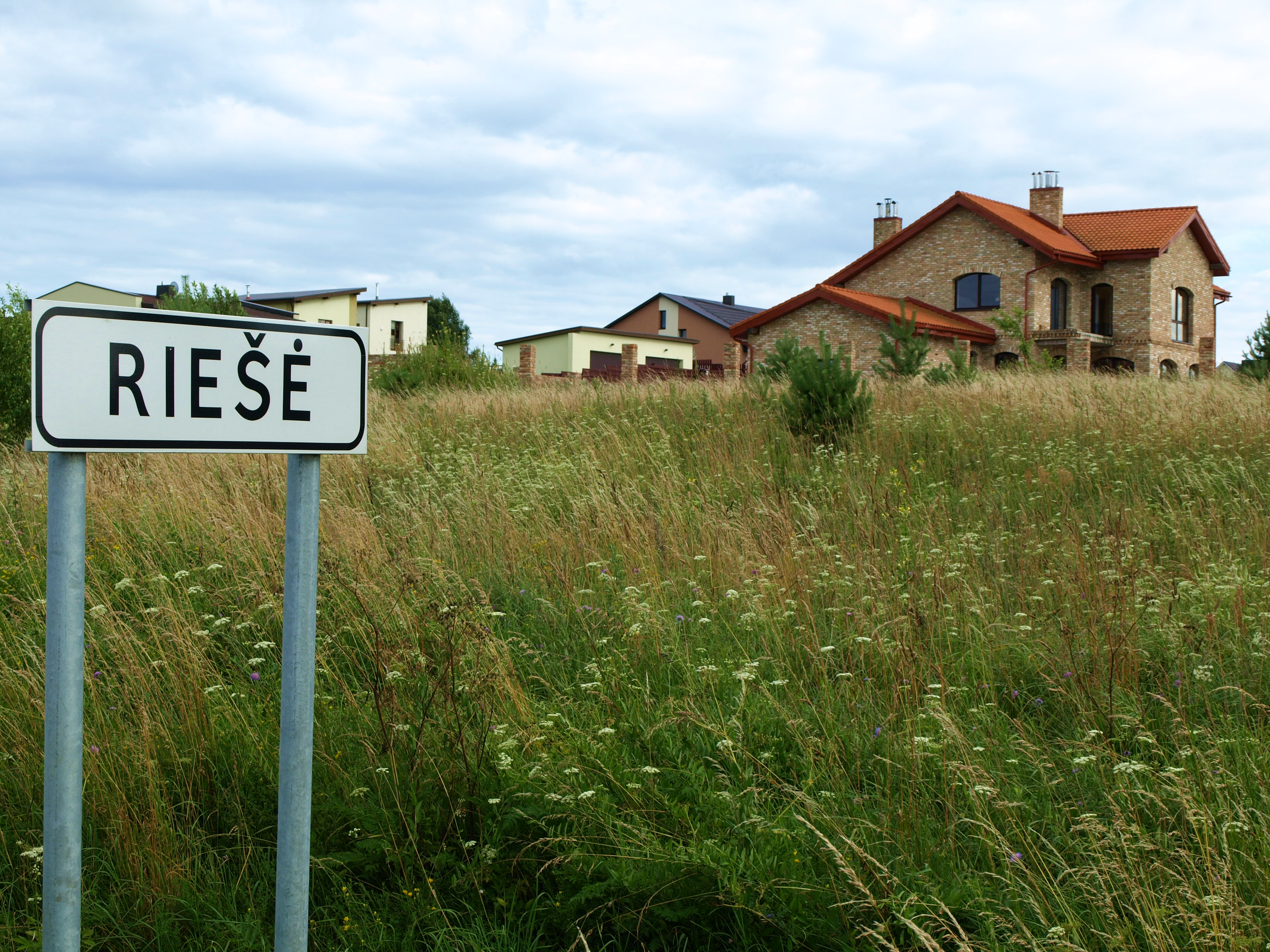
- Riešė village in Vilnius district municipality, a suburb of Vilnius.

- Location of Riešė
- Coordinates: 54°48′29″N 25°14′20″E
- Country: Lithuania
- County: Vilnius County
- Municipality: Vilnius District Municipality
- Eldership: Avižieniai Eldership

Population (2019)
  - Total: 1,707
- Time zone: UTC+2 (EET)
  - Summer (DST): UTC+3 (EEST)

Riešė is a village in Vilnius District Municipality, Lithuania. According to the 2021 census, it had population of 1,595, an increase from 2011 census, which recorded 1,234 inhabitants, up from 419 in 1989 or +281% in 32 years. According to the estimates of the Avižieniai Eldership, it had population of 1,707. Riešė together with adjacent villages is one of the fastest growing localities in the vicinity of Vilnius because of suburbanisation.

The oldest and the largest (more than 800 horses) horse farm in Lithuania, specializing in breeding and growing Trakehner, Žemaitukas, and other horse breeds, is situated in Riešė. Riešė has a champignon mushroom growing complex, one of the largest in Europe.

== History ==
In 1867, a 9th–10th century Dirham treasure (92 coins) minted by Abbasid and Saffarid nobility was found in Riešė – an evidence of economic ties and importance of this habitable place even a thousand years ago. Unfortunately, the treasure was taken to Russia by the imperial administration. Lands and manor in the eldership were historically known since 16th century, when they belonged to the Vilnius Chapter. In 1681, the mansion was given rights to build a bridge across Riešė River and collect tolls.
