= Socialist Action (Poland) =

Polish paramilitary organization

- Akcja Socjalistyczna; AS
- The Three Arrows symbol used by Socialist Action
- Other name: Red Front (Polish: Czerwony Front)
- Leader: Kazimierz Pużak
- Founded: February 8, 1934
- Dates active: May 1934–September 1939
- Dissolved: September 1939
- Merged into: The Okrzeja-Odra and Baron-Berlin battalions under the command of the Second Department of Polish General Staff
- Country: Poland
- Allegiance: Labour and Socialist International
- Headquarters: Warsaw, Warsaw Voivodeship
- Ideology: Social democracy
- Political position: Anti-fascism
- Status: Disbanded
- Size: 11,500 (1939)
- Part of: Polish Socialist Party

Socialist Action (Polish: Akcja Socjalistyczna, AS) was an anti-fascist organisation during the Second Polish Republic which acted as the paramilitary wing of the Polish Socialist Party (PPS).

== Background ==
The PPS had a tradition of organised militancy going back to workers' self-defense units that were first formed in 1904. These later evolved into Józef Piłsudski's guerilla organisation OBPPS, which became notorious for a string of heists including the Rogów raid, the Bezdany raid, and a raid near Sławków led by Tomasz Arciszewski. PPS members were active within the Riflemen's Association, and at the beginning of WWI made up the membership of the Polish Military Organisation. However as the PPS began to distance itself from Piłsudski, new militias were formed from 1917, which fought to shape and defend the newly independent Poland.

During the 1920s, violent attacks by the All-Polish Youth on political opponents became increasingly common, leading to the formation of an anti-nationalist self-defence militia by the Alliance of Democrats. Following the establishment of the National Radical Camp (ONR) political violence, often of an antisemitic nature, increased significantly. During this period self-defence of working class communities was often organised through sports clubs. In 1932 Polish, German, and Jewish members of working class sports clubs from Berlin, Danzig, Königsberg, Stettin, and Warsaw converged in Danzig forming a 5,000 strong anti-fascist protest in which they marched on the regional headquarters of the Nazi Party. Socialist Action would later often ally with such organisations for support in opposing fascism.

== Formation ==
According to the historian Ludwik Hass the official establishment of Socialist Action took place on the initiative of Kazimierz Pużak at a secret meeting of the Central Executive Committee of the PPS on 8 February 1934. The decision was made in response to the brutal suppression of the Social Democratic Party of Austria (SPÖ) during the Austrian Civil War.

However, the decision was not put into action until an attempt by the ONR to encroach on the working class stronghold of so-called ‘Red Wola’ in Warsaw. In May the ONR opened a new headquarters at 44 Wolska Street, provoking local socialists into ransacking the premises. The ONR then responded by firing on a PPS meeting, leading to recriminations and a demonstration in Śródmieście which was violently dispersed by the police. A group named the Red Arrows (Czerwone Strzały) was then formed by the PPS activists Stanisław Dubois and Edward Bugajski, albeit independent of the party's leadership. The SPÖ's own paramilitary, the Republikanischer Schutzbund (SchB), served as a model for the new organisation, with recruits being drawn from the PPS aligned Organizacja Młodzieży Towarzystwa Uniwersytetu Robotniczego, local workers sports clubs, and even members of the Communist Party of Poland (KPP). The spontaneous organisation of the Red Arrows finally forced the hand of the PPS leadership into organising a permanent uniformed paramilitary under their own aegis.

== Structure ==
Socialist Action was a legal entity of the PPS, with units being organised by affiliated local sports clubs, youth groups, trades unions and student organisations. Units were divided into squads and smaller section. The leadership of the organisation was through a command of Arciszewski, Edmund Chodyński, and Józef Dzięgielewski, headed by Pużak as commander-in-chief. Mention of how it sought members with military experience. The main base of Socialist Action was Warsaw where it had five district commands covering the areas of North Warsaw, Praga, Śródmieście, South Warsaw, and Wola. Socialist Action also had a youth branch, headed by Dubois, a women's branch led by Aniela Bełzówna, and, after 1938, a student unit in Warsaw. At its height the Warsaw formation of Socailst Action numbered up to 1,000 people.

Outside of Warsaw, Socialist Action units were soon formed in Częstochowa, the Dąbrowa Basin (such as Dąbrowa Górnicza, Kazimierz, Miłowice, Sosnowiec and Zawiercie), Kielce, Łódź (including Chojny, Piotrków Trybunalski, Radomsko, Tomaszów Mazowiecki and Zduńska Wola) and Radom. Socialist Action was present in the Kresy towns of Borysław, Lwów, Przemyśl and Wilno. In Pomerania well armed units were created from pre-existing paramilitaries that had been styled on the SchB. This included the areas of Gdynia, Grudziądz, Toruń, Wąbrzeźno, Luboń, and the Kociewian town of Świecie. No permanent units were formed in either Cracow, due to the opposition of Zygmunt Żuławski, nor the ONR stronghold of Poznań.

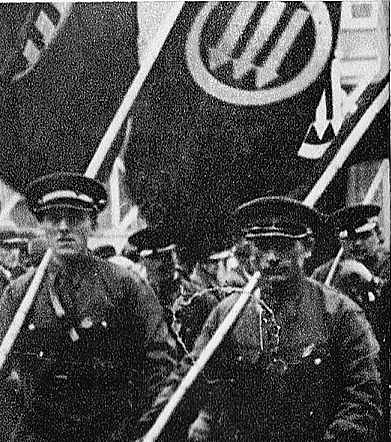
Members of Socialist Action marching in the Pomeranian city of Gdynia prior to 1939

Members of Socialist Action were generally, although not exclusively, working class, male, and young (between the ages of 17–30). Whilst they identified with the ideological programme of the PPS, members were also drawn to Socialist Action by familial bonds, and ties to local neighbourhoods. In regions where the organisation was less strong their units often tended toward a more Lumpenproletariat profile. The PPS ran training camps for Socialist Action's militants, the first of which was held in the village of Grzegorzewice with additional lectures given by Adam Próchnik and Zygmunt Zaremba for the attendees.

== Symbols ==
The symbol of Socialist Action was the Three Arrows, rendered in blue on a red background, which was originally used by the Iron Front, a similar social democratic organisation operating in the Weimar Republic. They also utilised the raised fist and had their own anthem.

== Actions ==
Like their counterparts in the Iron Front and the SchB, Socialist Action opposed the communists in accordance with the anti-communist party line of the PPS. The majority of street confrontations were with the ONR, although Socialist action also regularly clashed with All-Polish Youth, Sanation youth members, and even Camp of National Unity members who were known to have links to ONR.

One of the main principles of Socialist Action was opposition to antisemitism. In 1936 the ONR declared that they would enforce a ‘Jew free day’ on Ujazdów Avenue, one of Warsaw's main thoroughfares. Together with members of the boxing section of the workers' sports club Skra Warsaw, militants of Socialist Action physically confronted the proposed event. Socialist Action members would later hold their own ‘Pinstripe free day’ (Dzień bez klap) in mockery of the ONR. In the same year, Socialist Action successfully countered an attempt by ONR activists to physically prevent Jewish students from commencing studies at the Warsaw University of Technology.

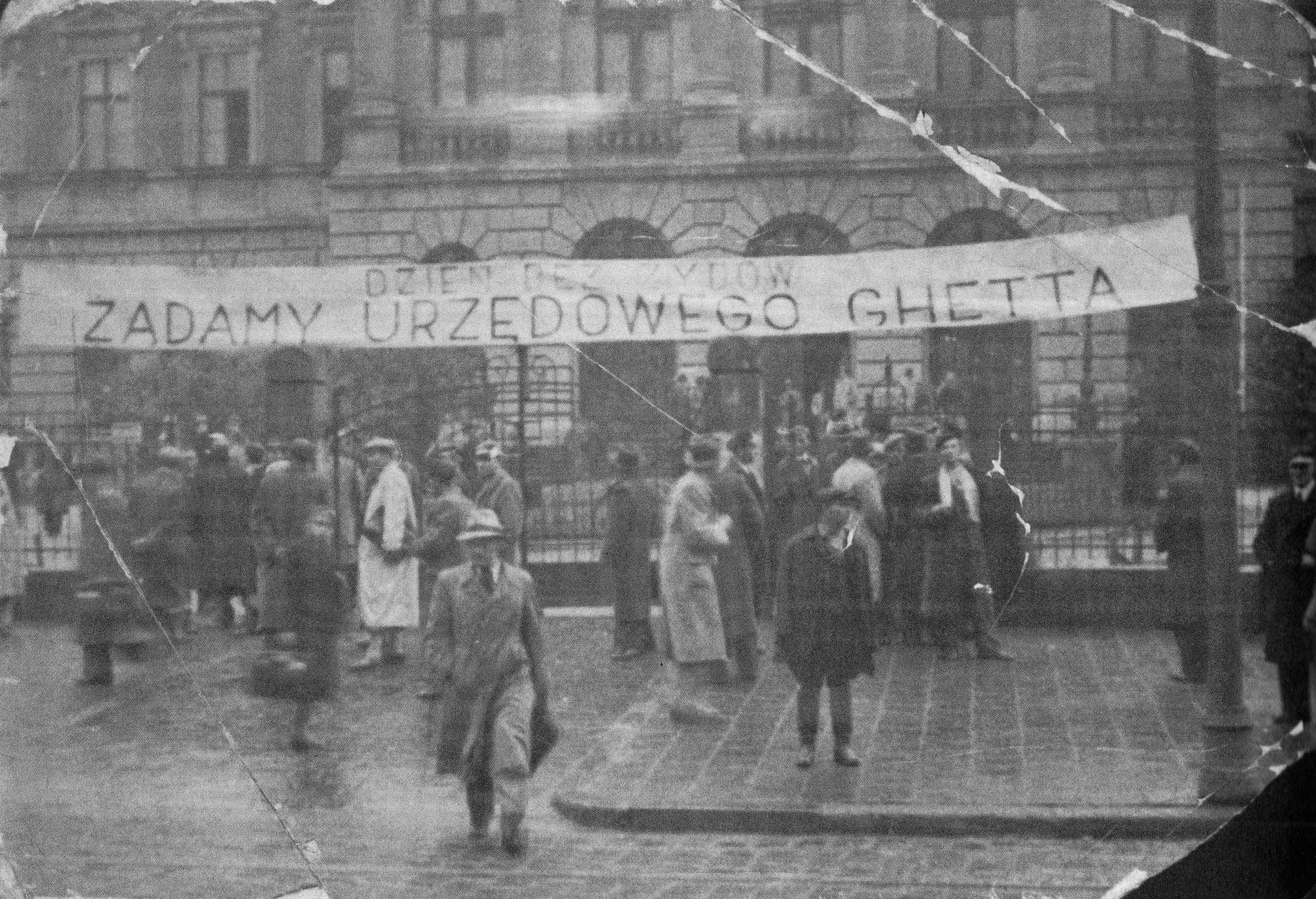
A banner declaring a ‘Jew free day’ (Dzień bez Żydów) at an ONR picket in support of ghetto benches at Lwów Polytechnic

At the height of his political ascendancy in 1937, Socialist Action successfully broke up a rally of the ONR leader Bolesław Piasecki in Warsaw.

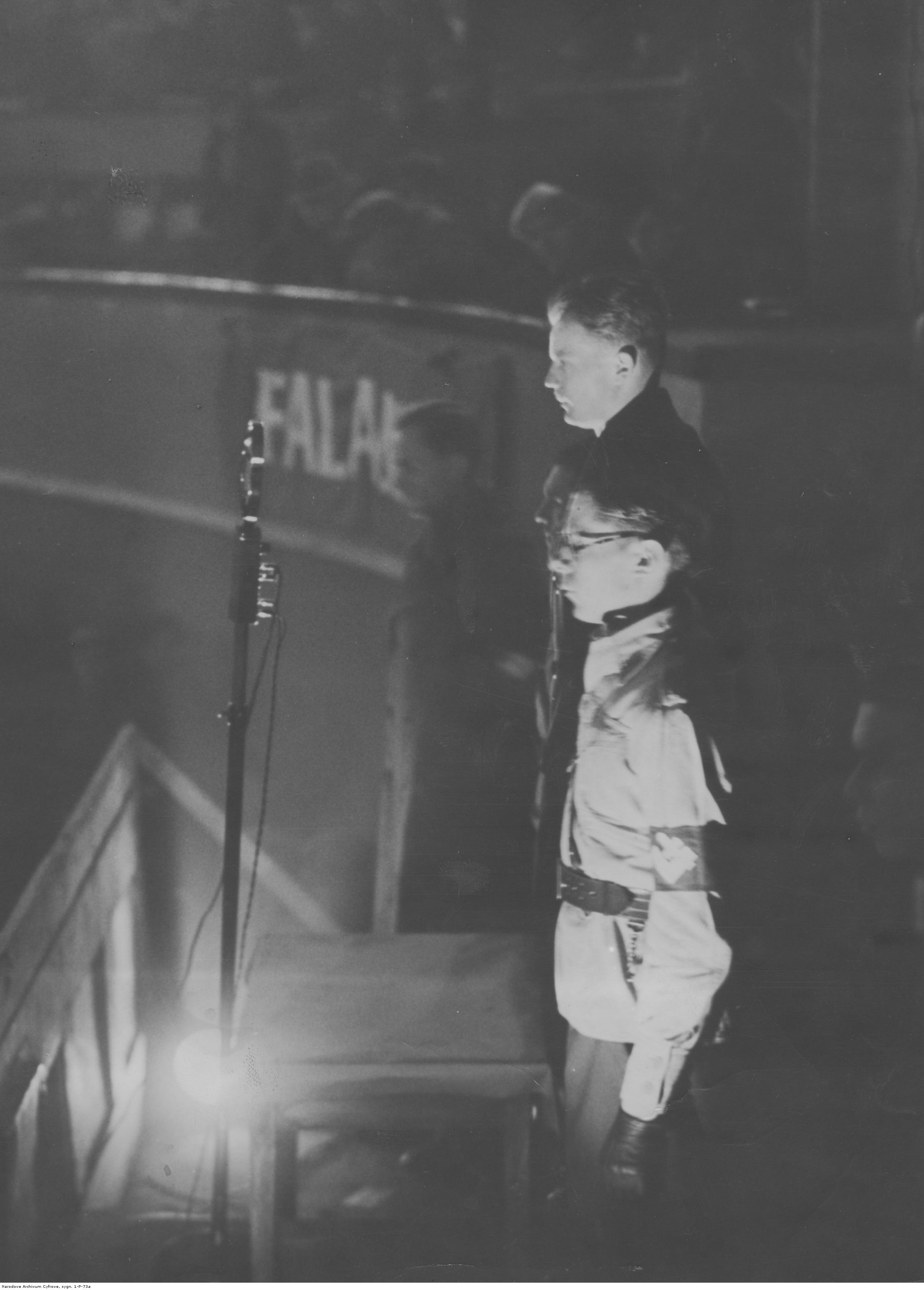
Piasecki at the rally in Warsaw prior to his speech being disrupted by Socialist Action, 28 November 1937

While Socialist Action organised large processions for the annual May Day, they also took part in local celebrations such as those held in Warsaw's housing estates. Street confrontations with fascists were a daily occurrence in Warsaw, from which Socialist Action would aim to retrieve their opponents' symbols such as the Szczerbiec badge. Members of Socialist Action were active in disrupting the distribution of fascist newspapers and destroying propaganda posters, as well as distributing their own literature and posters.

== Dissolution ==
Since the mid–1930s Pużak, Arciszewski, Chodyński, and Dzięgielewski had prepared for Socialist Action to go underground, a plan which was adapted following the invasion of Poland. In September 1939 the PPS leadership officially dissolved the party and militants from Socialist Action were recruited to new units intended to launch attacks behind enemy lines. The Okrzeja-Odra battalion operated in Silesia and the Dąbrowa Basin, whilst the Baron-Berlin battalion was based in Łódź.

== See also ==
- Arbeiter-Schutzbund
- Iron Front
- Republikanischer Schutzbund
