= Coat of arms of the Łódź Voivodeship =

Polish coat of arms

- Armiger: Dorota Ryl, Voivode of the Łódź Voivodeship
- Adopted: 25 June 2002
- Use: Łódź Voivodeship

The coat of arms of the Łódź Voivodeship, Poland is an Iberian-style escutcheon with square top and rounded base. It is divided horizontally into three stripes (pales), that area from left to right: yellow (golden), red, and yellow (red), with the middle stripe being twice as big as the other stripes. It also include three charges placed in its center, with two placed next to each over, on the top of the third one. The top two charges are Kuyavian Hybrids, divided into half, into a lion and an eagle, while the bottom one is an eagle. It was designed by Marek Adamczewski, and officially adopted on 25 June 2002.

== Design ==
The coat of arms of the Łódź Voivodeship consists of an Iberian style escutcheon with square top and rounded base. It is divided horizontally into three stripes (pales), that area from left to right: yellow (golden), red, and yellow (red), with the middle stripe being twice as big as the other stripes. It also include three charges placed in its center, with two placed next to each over, on the top of the third one. The top two charges are Kuyavian Hybrids, divided into half, into a lion and an eagle, while the bottom one is an eagle. The top left charge, features a red left-facing half of a lion with black claws and white tooth, joined with white right-facing half of an eagle, with orange beak white tongue, and orange legs with black claws, both wearing together an orange crown. The charge is placed in the middle of the boundary between a middle red stripe, and a neighboring to the left, yellow stripe. The top right charge features a black left-facing eagle with orange beak and legs with black claws, joined with a red right-facing lion, with black claws and white tooth, both wearing together an orange crown. It is also placed in the middle of the boundary between a middle red stripe, and a neighboring to the right, yellow stripe. The bottom charge is a black eagle with orange beak with white tongue, and orange legs with black claws, that is placed within the middle red stripe. It has an orange capital letter R on its chest.

The red and yellow colours are a reference to the two colours present in the flag and coat of arms of Łódź. The three charges used in the state flag reference the three historical subdivisions of the Polish–Lithuanian Commonwealth, that were located in the modern location of the voivodeship. The hybrid of a red lion and white eagle comes from the coat of arms of the Łęczyca Voivodeship, the hybrid of a black eagle and red lion, to the Sieradz Voivodeship, and a black eagle, to the Rawa Voivodeship. The letter R on the breast of the eagle refers to the Duchy of Rawa, a state that existed in the area in the High Middle Ages.

== History ==
=== Second Polish Republic ===
The design of the coat of arms of the Łódź Voivodeship proposed in 1928.

In 1928, as part of the project to design the coat of arms for the voivodeships of the Second Polish Republic, the design for the coat of arms of the Łódź Voivodeship had been created. Though planned to be officially approved, it never was, as it was decided to postpone the approval of the subdivision symbols due to the planned administrative reform, that eventually took place in 1938. Eventually, the plans for the establishment of the coat of arms had been stopped by the Invasion of Poland by Nazi Germany, on 1 September 1939, that begun the World War II, and were not picked up back after the end of the conflict.

The proposed design of the coat of arms consisted of an Iberian style escutcheon with square top and rounded base, that was divided into four parts in the shape of a chessboard. The field in the top left corner consisted of two equal horizontal stripes, white on the right, and red on the left. It included the charge of a Kuyavian Hybrids, divided into half, into a red lion with black claws on the left and a white (silver) eagle with yellow (golden) beak and legs, one the left, with the division being located on the boundary of two stripes. Both animals wore a single yellow (golden) crown on their head. The elements were taken from the coat of arms of the Łęczyca Voivodeship of the Crown of the Kingdom of Poland, that existed within the borders of the voivodeship from 14th to 18th century. The field in the top right corner consisted of white and red chessboard, with the head of a black aurochs with a yellow (golden) crown, and a yellow (golden) ring in its nose. The elements were taken from the coat of arms of the Kalisz Voivodeship of the Crown of the Kingdom of Poland that existed within the borders of the voivodeship from 14th to 18th century. The coat of arms also served as the symbol of Greater Poland. The field in the bottom left corner consisted of the red background with a white (silver) Lamb of God facing right, with its head turned left, and a yellow (golden) aureola behind it. It hold a white (silver) banner with the red cross on it, and stands next to a yellow (golden) chalice. The elements were taken from the coat of arms of the Wieluń Land, a historical area that existed within the borders of the voivodeship. The field in the bottom right corner consisted of two equal horizontal stripes, yellow (golden) on the right, and red on the left. It included the charge of a Kuyavian Hybrids, divided into half, into a red lion with black claws on the left and a black eagle with yellow (golden) beak and legs, one the left, with the division being located on the boundary of two stripes. Both animals wore a single yellow (golden) crown on their head. The elements were taken from the coat of arms of the Sieradz Voivodeship of the Crown of the Kingdom of Poland, that existed within the borders of the voivodeship from 14th to 18th century.

=== Unofficial coat of arms ===
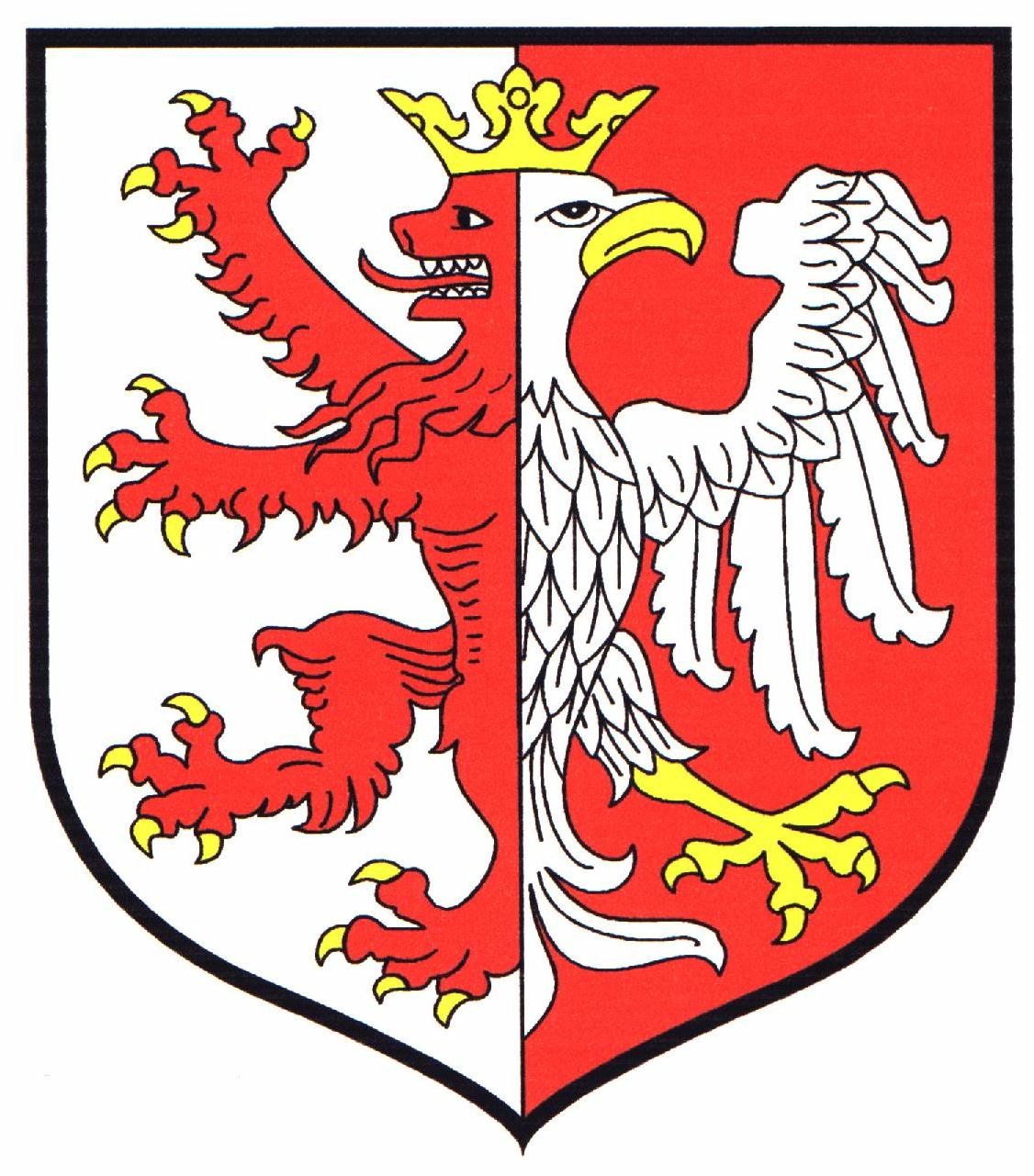
The coat of arms of Łęczyca County, used as the unofficial coat of arms by the Łódź Voivodeship Sejmik, from 1998, to 2000.

In 1998, the Łódź Voivodeship Sejmik begun unofficially using the coat of arms of the Łęczyca County, as a symbol of the Łódź Voivodeship. The coat of arms was divided vertically into two stripes, white on the left, and red on the right. The left side featured a left-facing half of a red lion with a red tongue and yellow (golden) claws. The right side featured a right-facing white eagle with yellow (golden) beak and legs. Both creatures were joined, and wore a single yellow (golden) crown of their heads. Additionally, the Regional Assembly also created a flag, that was divided vertically into two equal stripes, a yellow on the top, and a golden on the bottom, and with the coat of arms of the Łęczyca County in the middle. Such usage of the coat of arms had been protested by the Łęczyca County, and in 2000, it was criticized by the Heraldic Commission of Poland.

=== Current coat of arms ===
In 2002, the Łódź Voivodeship Sejmik had commissioned Marek Adamczewski to create new coat of arms and flag. Both were officially adopted on 25 June 2002, in the resolution no. XLIV/514/2002.

== See also ==
- flag of the Łódź Voivodeship
