= Flag of Łódź Voivodeship =

Flag of the Łódź Voivodeship, Poland

Łódź Voivodeship
- Use: civil flag
- Proportion: 5:8
- Adopted: 25 June 2002
- Design: rectangle divided into five vertical stripes alternating between red and yellow
- Designed by: Marek Adamczewski
- Use: state flag
- Proportion: 5:8
- Adopted: 25 June 2002
- Designed by: Marek Adamczewski

The civil flag of the Łódź Voivodeship, Poland is a rectangle divided into five vertical stripes, which are alternating between red and yellow colours. It was designed by Marek Adamczewski, and officially adopted on 25 June 2002.

== Design ==
The civil flag of the Łódź Voivodeship is a rectangle, with an aspect ratio of height to width of 5:8, which is divided into five vertical stripes. Those stripes are alternating between red and yellow, with red stripes being located on the right and left boundary of the flag, and in its middle, while yellow stripes are located between them.

The state flag utilizes the design of the civil flag, with the addition of three charges placed in its center, with two placed next to each over, on the top of the third one, that were adopted from the coat of arms of the voivodeship. The top two charges are Kuyavian Hybrids, divided into half, into a lion and an eagle, while the bottom one is an eagle. The top left charge, features a red left-facing half of a lion with black claws and white tooth, joined with white right-facing half of an eagle, with orange beak white tongue, and orange legs with black claws, both wearing together an orange crown. The charge is placed in the middle of the boundary between a middle red stripe, and a neighboring to the left, yellow stripe. The top right charge features a black left-facing eagle with orange beak and legs with black claws, joined with a red right-facing lion, with black claws and white tooth, both wearing together an orange crown. It is also placed in the middle of the boundary between a middle red stripe, and a neighboring to the right, yellow stripe. The bottom charge is a black eagle with orange beak with white tongue, and orange legs with black claws, that is placed within the middle red stripe. It has an orange capital letter R on its chest.

The red and yellow colours are a reference to the two colours present in the flag and coat of arms of Łódź. The three charges used in the state flag reference the three historical subdivisions of the Polish–Lithuanian Commonwealth, that were located in the modern location of the voivodeship. The hybrid of a red lion and white eagle comes from the coat of arms of the Sieradz Voivodeship, the hybrid of a black eagle and red lion, to the Łęczyca Voivodeship, and a black eagle, to the Rawa Voivodeship. The letter R on the breast of the eagle refers to the Duchy of Rawa, a state that existed in the area in the High Middle Ages.

== History ==
The provisional flag unofficially used by the Łódź Voivodeship Sejmik from 1998 to 2000.

In 1998, the Łódź Voivodeship Sejmik begun unofficially using the coat of arms of the Łęczyca County, as a symbol of the Łódź Voivodeship. The coat of arms was divided vertically into two stripes, white on the left, and red on the right. The left side featured a left-facing half of a red lion with a red tongue and yellow (golden) claws. The right side featured a right-facing white eagle with yellow (golden) beak and legs. Both creatures were joined, and wore a single yellow (golden) crown of their heads. Additionally, the Regional Assembly also created a flag, that was divided vertically into two equal stripes, a yellow on the top, and a golden on the bottom, and with the coat of arms of the Łęczyca County in the middle. The flag was proposed by Ryszard Bonisławski. Such usage of the coat of arms had been protested by the Łęczyca County, and in 2000, it was criticized by the Heraldic Commission of Poland.

In 2002, the Łódź Voivodeship Sejmik had commissioned Marek Adamczewski to create new coat of arms and flag. Both were officially adopted on 25 June 2002, in the resolution no. XLIV/514/2002.

== See also ==
- coat of arms of the Łódź Voivodeship
