= Warsaw Praga County =

County within Warsaw City (1928–1939)

- County of Warsaw
- 1928–1939
- Location within Warsaw in 1931.
- Capital: Warsaw
- Area
  - 1939: 43 km^{2} (17 sq mi)
- Population
  - 1931: 176 100
  - Type: County
- History
  - Established: 24 August 1928
  - Disestablished: 1939
- Contained within
  - Country: Second Polish Republic
  - Voivodeship: Capital City of Warsaw
| Preceded by | Succeeded by |
| Warsaw County | Warsaw County |

The Warsaw Praga County (Note: Polish: Powiat prasko-warszawski) was a county of the Capital City of Warsaw, a voivodeship of the Second Polish Republic. It existed from 24 August 1928 to 1939.

== History ==
It was established on 24 August 1928, from the part of the Warsaw County, as one of the counties of the Capital City of Warsaw, that functioned as the voivodeship of the Second Polish Republic. The county ceased to exist in 1939, following the Invasion of Poland by Nazi Germany, and subsequent occupation of the county. As such, it was incorporated into then reestablished Warsaw County. In 1931, it had 176 100 inhabitants, and in 1939, it had an area of 43 km^{2}.

== See also ==
- Praga
