= North Warsaw County =

County within Warsaw City (1928–1939; 1944–1960)

- County of Warsaw
- 1928–1939; 1944–1960
- Location within Warsaw in 1931.
- Capital: Warsaw
- Area
  - 1939: 31 km^{2} (12 sq mi)
  - 1947: 15.27 km^{2} (5.90 sq mi)
- Population
  - 1931: 478 200
  - 1946: 35 856
  - Type: County
- History
  - Established: 24 August 1928
  - Disestablishment: 1939
  - Re-establishment: 1944
  - Disestablished: 1960
- Contained within
  - Country: Second Polish Republic (1928–1939); Provisional Government of the Republic of Poland (1944–1945); Provisional Government of National Unity (1945–1947); Polish People's Republic (1947–1960)
  - Voivodeship: Capital City of Warsaw (1928–1939); Warsaw (1944–1960)
Preceded by
Warsaw County
Succeeded by
Warsaw County
Warsaw Śródmieście County
Warsaw

The North Warsaw County (Note: Polish: Powiat północno-warszawski) was a county within the city of Warsaw. It existed from 1928 to 1939, and from 1944 to 1960, as a county of Warsaw, that functioned as the voivodeship. From 1928 to 1939, it was under the administration of the Second Polish Republic, from 1944 to 1945, under the Provisional Government of the Republic of Poland, from 1945 to 1947, under the Provisional Government of National Unity, and from 1947 to 1960, under the Polish People's Republic.

== History ==
It was established on 24 August 1928, from the part of the Warsaw County, as one of the counties of the Capital City of Warsaw, a voivodeship of the Second Polish Republic. On 1 April 1931, the south-eastern part of the county was incorporated into then established Warsaw Śródmieście County. It ceased to exist in 1939, following the Invasion of Poland by Nazi Germany, and subsequent occupation of the county. As such, it was incorporated into the reestablished Warsaw County. In 1931, it had 478 200 inhabitants, and in 1939, it had an area of 31 km^{2}.

It was reestablished in 1944, from the part of the Warsaw County, as one of the counties of the Warsaw, that functioned as the separate voivodeship. From 1944 to 1945, it was within the territory under the administration of the Provisional Government of the Republic of Poland, which then was replaced by the Provisional Government of National Unity. In 1947, the government had been replaced by the Polish People's Republic. The county existed until 1960, when the counties were replaced by the city districts. In 1946 it had 35 856 inhabitants, and in 1947 it had an area of 15.27 km^{2}.

== Government ==
In the Second Polish Republic, the leader of the county was the town starosta, that was appointed by the Minister of Internal Affairs. They were:

- 1928 – 18 September 1938: Jan Wasylkiewicz;
- 18 September 1938 – 1939: Jerzy Skrzyński.
