= Subdivisions of the Second Polish Republic =

Administrative divisions (1919–1939)

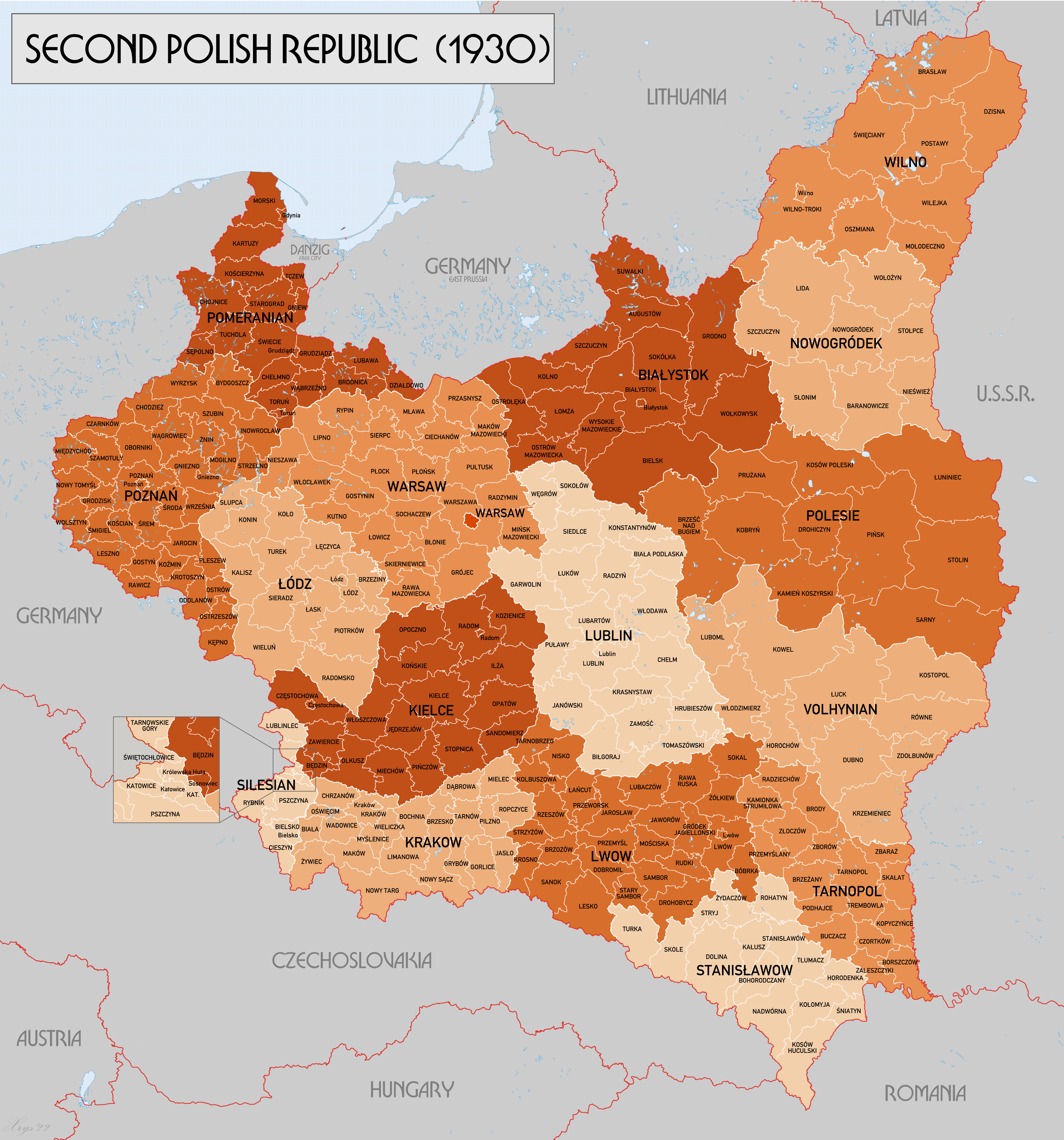
Administrative division of Second Polish Republic, 1930. Colors denote voivodeships, division into powiats visible on the lower level.

Polish voivodeships, 1922–1939.

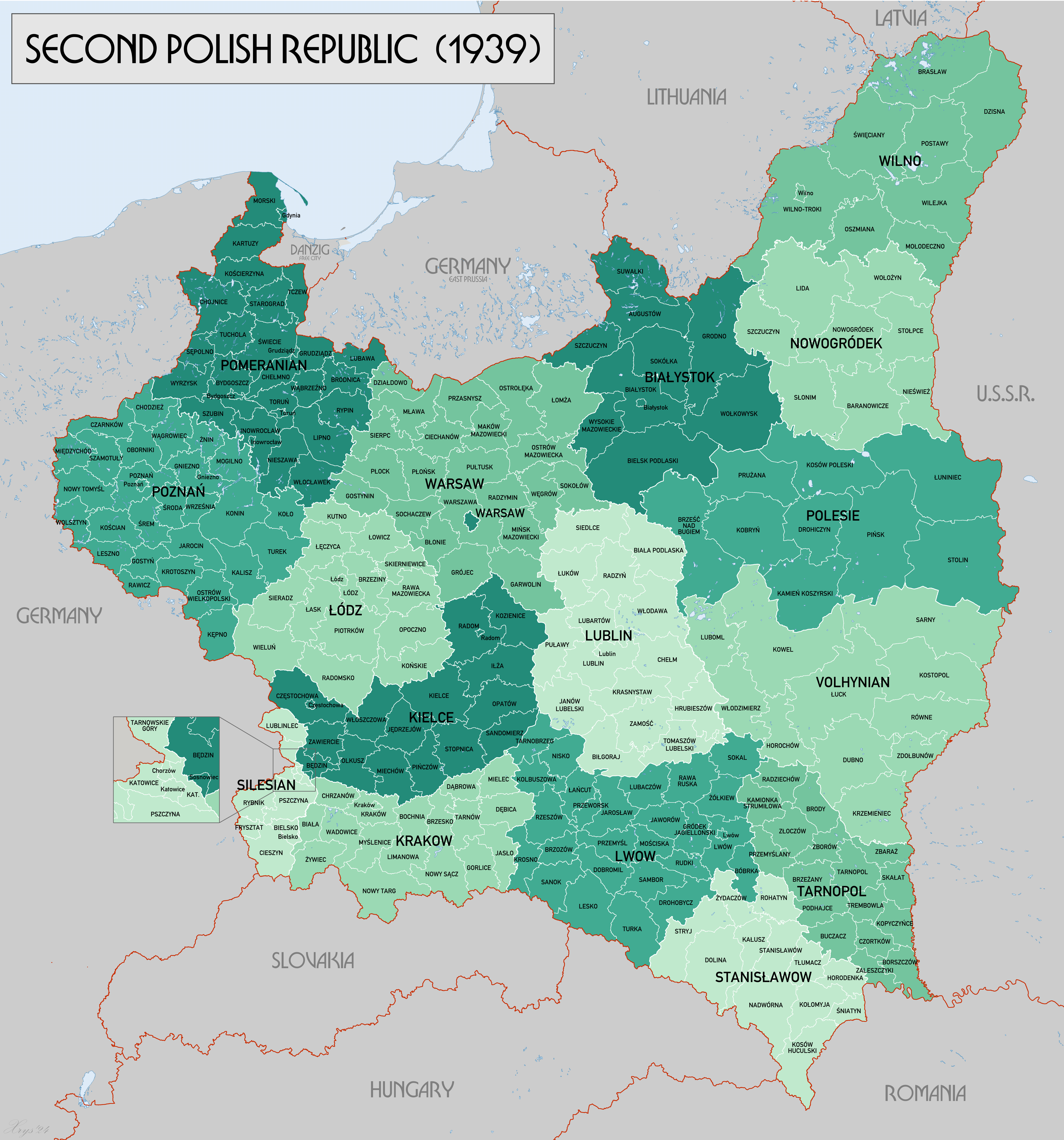
Administrative Map in 1939 showing April 1938 voivodship revisions and Slovak border changes

Subdivisions of the Second Polish Republic became an issue immediately after the creation of the Second Polish Republic in 1918. The Polish–Lithuanian Commonwealth had been partitioned in the late 18th century. The various parts of what was now Polish territory had belonged to different states with different administrative structures: Austria-Hungary (mostly forming part of the Kingdom of Galicia and Lodomeria), the German Empire (specifically the Kingdom of Prussia) and the Russian Empire.

In 1919 the first voivodeships of interwar Poland were created; in addition, the capital of Warsaw had the status of an independent city-voivodeship. In the years 1919–1921 additional voivodeships were created, as borders of Poland were still fluid, with events such as the Silesian Uprisings in the West and the Polish-Soviet War in the East. Eventually by 1921 Poland would have 15 voivodeships, the Warsaw capital city-voivodeship and the Autonomous Silesian Voivodeship (the system known as 15+1+1). Additionally, the creation of the new Sandomierz Voivodeship was planned for late 1939.

The lower level of administration, below voivodeships, were powiats (counties). They were subject to several reforms, particularly in early and late 1930s. Below them were gminas and gromadas. Shortly before the Second World War, in April 1939, Poland had 264 powiats, 611 urban and 3195 rural gminas and 40533 gromads.

The division was based on a three-tier system. On the lowest rung were the gminy, which were little more than local town and village governments. These were then grouped together into powiaty which were then arranged into województwa.

Polish voivodeships in the interbellum (data as of April 1, 1937)
Car plates (since 1937)	Coat of arms	Voivodeship Separate city	Capital	Area in 1000 km^{2} (1930)	Population in 1000s (1931)
00-19		City of Warsaw	Warsaw	0.14	1179.5
85-89		warszawskie	Warsaw	31.7	2460.9
20-24		białostockie	Białystok	26.0	1263.3
25-29		kieleckie	Kielce	22.2	2671.0
30-34		krakowskie	Kraków	17.6	2300.1
35-39		lubelskie	Lublin	26.6	2116.2
40-44		lwowskie	Lwów	28.4	3126.3
45-49		łódzkie	Łódź	20.4	2650.1
50-54		nowogródzkie	Nowogródek	23.0	1057.2
55-59		poleskie	Brześć nad Bugiem	36.7	1132.2
60-64		pomorskie	Toruń	25.7	1884.4
65-69		poznańskie	Poznań	28.1	2339.6
70-74		stanisławowskie	Stanisławów	16.9	1480.3
75-79 ?		śląskie (autonomous)	Katowice	5.1	1533.5
80-84		tarnopolskie	Tarnopol	16.5	1600.4
90-94		wileńskie	Wilno	29.0	1276.0
95-99		wołyńskie	Łuck	35.7	2085.6

On April 1, 1938, the borders of several western Voivodeships changed considerably. For more information, see Territorial changes of Polish Voivodeships on April 1, 1938.

== Polish Voivodeships 1919–1939 ==
Total number of Voivodeships - 16, plus the capital city of Warsaw, which was regarded as a separate unit.

=== Biggest Voivodeships (as of August 1, 1939) ===
- Polesie Voivodeship - area 36,668 km^{2} (14,158 sq mi)
- Volhynian Voivodeship - area 35,754 km^{2} (13,805 sq mi)
- Warszawa Voivodeship - area 31,656 km^{2} (12,222 sq mi)

=== Smallest Voivodeships (as of August 1, 1939) ===
- miasto stołeczne Warszawa (the capital city of Warsaw) - area 141 km^{2} (54 sq mi)
- Silesian Voivodeship - area 5,122 km^{2} (1,978 sq mi)
- Tarnopol Voivodeship - area 16,533 km^{2} (6,383 sq mi)

=== Most populous Voivodeships ===
- Lwów Voivodeship - pop. 3 126 300,
- Kielce Voivodeship - pop. 2 671 000,
- Łódź Voivodeship - pop. 2 650 100.

=== Least populous Voivodeships ===
- Nowogródek Voivodeship - pop. 1 057 200,
- Polesie Voivodeship - pop. 1 132 200,
- miasto stołeczne Warszawa (the capital city of Warsaw) - pop. 1 179 500.

== Polish Counties 1919–1939 ==
Total number of counties (as of August 1, 1939) - 264, including 23 urban counties.

=== Biggest counties (as of August 1, 1939) ===
- Wilno – Troki county (area 5,967 km^{2} (2,304 sq mi)),
- Łuniniec county (area 5,722 km^{2} (2,209 sq mi)),
- Kowel county (area 5,682 km^{2} (2,194 sq mi)).

=== Smallest counties (as of August 1, 1939) ===
- Warszawa-Srodmiescie (mid-Warsaw) (area 10 km^{2} (3.9 sq mi)),
- city of Bielsko (area 10 km^{2} (3.9 sq mi)),
- city of Gniezno (area 18 km^{2} (6.9 sq mi)).

=== Most populous counties ===
- city of Łódź county (pop. 604 600),
- Warszawa-North county (pop. 478 200),
- Katowice county, (pop. 357 300).

=== Least populous counties ===
- city of Bielsko county, (pop. 25 400),
- city of Gniezno, (pop. 30 700),
- Międzychód county, (pop. 31 000).

== Sources ==
- Mały rocznik statystyczny 1939, Nakładem Głównego Urzędu Statystycznego, Warszawa 1939 (Concise Statistical Year-Book of Poland, Warsaw 1939).
