= Anti-fascism in Poland =

Anti-fascism in Poland is a political and social movement that emerged in the 1920s in opposition to fascism, extreme nationalism, antisemitism, and authoritarianism. Throughout its history, it has encompassed a wide range of groups and ideologies, including socialist, communist, democratic, Jewish, anarchist, and anti-racist movements. During World War II, Polish anti-fascists participated in various resistance organizations fighting Nazi Germany and its collaborators. Under the Polish People's Republic, anti-fascism became part of the state's official ideology, while after the fall of communism in 1989, independent anti-fascist activism developed through grassroots organizations, countercultural movements, and civil society initiatives. Today, the movement includes groups engaged in opposing far-right extremism, racism, xenophobia, and antisemitism through protest, education, and public campaigns.

== History ==
=== Second Polish Republic ===
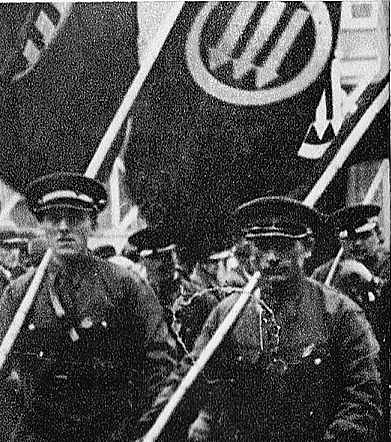
Members of Socialist Action with flags bearing the anti-fascist Three Arrows symbol

In the Second Polish Republic, opposition to fascism and extreme nationalist movements existed among various political and social circles. The Polish Socialist Party (PPS) was particularly important, combining opposition to fascism with the defence of democratic freedoms and its socialist programme. Other democratic, peasant, Jewish, and left-wing circles also participated in activities opposing fascism, nationalism, and antisemitism. The Communist Party of Poland (KPP) represented one current within this broader movement, but anti-fascism in the Second Polish Republic cannot be identified exclusively with communist activity.

More explicit reactions to fascism emerged in the second half of the 1920s, when radical nationalist circles developed in Poland and organizations influenced by fascist ideology appeared. In December 1926, the Camp of Great Poland (OWP) was founded. Its ideology and organization displayed similarities to fascist movements, although its attitude towards Italian fascism remained ambiguous. At this time, opposition to fascism had not yet developed into a unified political movement. The PPS remained an especially important political force, but its relations with the Communist Workers' Party of Poland (KPRP) and the later KPP were marked by sharp political conflict. In 1926 and 1928, these disputes led to violent clashes between PPS and communist militias during May Day demonstrations in Warsaw.

==== Socialist current ====
Election poster of the Polish Socialist Party during the local elections in Tomaszów Mazowiecki on 23 April 1939. The Three Arrows, an anti-fascist symbol, are visible on the poster.

One of the most important elements of PPS activity was the self-defence of the socialist movement. In the context of intensifying political conflicts, the party developed its own structures to protect its organizational activities. On 8 December 1934, the PPS Executive Committee decided to establish Socialist Action (AS), a paramilitary organization. Its activities included protecting marches and other events organized by the socialist movement.

The PPS's anti-fascist position was explicitly formulated in the Radom Programme, adopted at the 24th Congress of the PPS in Radom on 2 February 1937. In the section devoted to fascism, the programme described it as a movement based, among other things, on nationalism, racial hatred, and imperialism, and as a system destroying freedom and democracy through violence. In the section concerning the socialist movement, the PPS stated that its main task was to "halt the advance of the fascist current in Poland" and declared its intention to defend existing democratic freedoms.

The PPS's anti-fascism was distinct from communism. The Radom Programme strongly criticized communist tactics, considering them a factor weakening the labour movement. The PPS therefore did not intend to subordinate its activities to the KPP or adopt the communist conception of political struggle. At the same time, the party emphasized the need to defend existing democratic freedoms and oppose fascist tendencies.

The PPS also attempted to cooperate with other political forces. In the mid-1930s, relations between the PPS and KPP became closer. In July 1935, the parties concluded a so-called non-aggression pact intended to limit mutual attacks and create opportunities for cooperation in response to the growing strength of right-wing groups. The agreement did not result in lasting unification. Differences concerning communism, the Soviet Union, the political system, and methods of political activity remained substantial.

Cooperation between sections of the PPS and KPP was also reflected in the activities of Dziennik Popularny, published in 1936–1937. The newspaper emerged among supporters of united-front cooperation, with the participation of both communist activists and sections of the PPS left. Its editor-in-chief was Norbert Barlicki, a PPS activist. Dziennik Popularny was one of the most important press initiatives associated with the idea of a popular front in Poland.

Banner reading "iterature art in the fight against fascism" during a May Day procession in Warsaw in 1936

Dziennik Popularny conducted explicitly anti-fascist journalism. It covered, among other subjects, fascism in Poland and Europe, the Spanish Civil War, and antisemitism. The newspaper also had a relatively wide circulation; Mierzecki records an increase in its circulation to tens of thousands of copies, with Sunday editions sometimes reaching even higher figures. The newspaper ceased publication in March 1937.

In the second half of the 1930s, the concept of a "democratic front", opposed to the communist concept of the popular front, emerged in some circles associated with the PPS and the peasant movement. This did not represent a uniform position within the entire People's Party; significant differences and mutual distrust persisted between the PPS and the peasant movement.

Anti-fascist ideas also developed outside political parties, including among sections of the Polish intelligentsia and cultural circles. One example was the Lwów-based Sygnały, published from 1933 to 1939. Andrzej Świecki noted that after the magazine was relaunched in 1936, its profile became increasingly associated with the anti-fascist camp and with the idea of cooperation among left-wing and democratic circles. Sygnały published material on fascism, the situation in countries ruled by dictatorships, and the threat of war.

==== Bund and the Jewish minority ====
A separate anti-fascist current was represented by the Bund, or the General Jewish Labour Union. It was an independent Jewish socialist movement which opposed antisemitism in the Second Polish Republic and organized self-defence activities within the Jewish community. In the second half of the 1930s, the Bund cooperated with the PPS in this area. This cooperation did not mean that the Bund was politically subordinate to the PPS or that it abandoned its distinct programme as a Jewish socialist movement.

Anti-fascist activity among the Jewish population was not limited to the Bund's party interests. In the second half of the 1930s, as antisemitism intensified, the Bund conducted extensive activities in defence of the civil rights of the Jewish population, organizing protests and self-defence against violence by far-right militias. Its mass and social activities, involving trade unions, youth organizations, and cultural institutions, were particularly significant. Opposition to antisemitism and fascist violence thus extended beyond people directly associated with the Bund's ideology and contributed to its growing importance among different sections of the Jewish community.

==== International dimension of Polish anti-fascism ====
The best-known example of the international dimension of anti-fascism involving people connected with Poland was the Spanish Civil War. The overwhelming majority of Polish volunteers fought on the Republican side. The historian Jacek Pietrzak estimates their number at approximately 4,500–5,000; about 75% were emigrants, most of them living in France. Probably around 600–800 volunteers came directly from Poland, with communists strongly predominating among them.

Most Polish volunteers fought in the 13th International Brigade, named after Jarosław Dąbrowski, which participated in major operations of the war. The brigade suffered very heavy losses, estimated at approximately 30–40%. One of its commanders was Karol Świerczewski. Polish participation in the Spanish Civil War was therefore closely connected with the international communist movement, but it was also presented by the participants themselves and their circles as a struggle against fascism on the side of the Republic.

==== Peasant movement ====
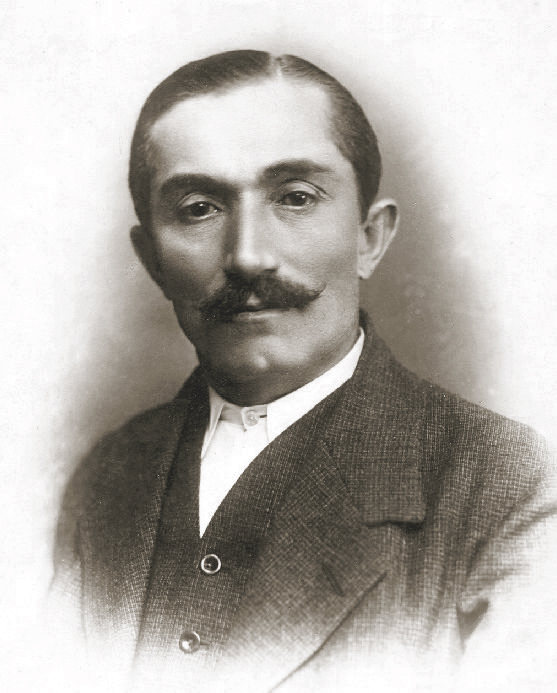
Wincenty Witos was critical of dictatorial and fascist tendencies in Europe, as well as authoritarian trends in Polish political life

An important current of democratic opposition to fascism was the peasant movement. This position was particularly clearly expressed in resolutions adopted by the People's Party Congress on 17 January 1937. The resolution stated that "every dictatorship is disastrous for peasants" and that the rural masses could obtain the influence due to them only under a democratic system. The People's Party rejected cooperation both with "fascism from the right" and with "communism from the left", and declared its willingness to cooperate with "genuinely democratic" groups while retaining its political independence. This positioned the peasant movement as a distinct anti-dictatorial and anti-fascist current, based on the defence of parliamentary democracy and peasant interests.

The youth wing of the peasant movement also played an important role, particularly the Union of Rural Youth "Wici". This milieu developed a socially radical form of agrarianism, emphasized democracy and civil rights, and remained in conflict with the policies of the Sanacja. The organization was closely associated with the People's Party while retaining its own ideological character. In this sense, "Wici" was one element of the broader democratic and socially radical current of the peasant movement that opposed dictatorial and extreme nationalist tendencies in the political life of the Second Polish Republic.

At the same time, the attitude of the peasant movement towards communism remained ambivalent, and its democratic anti-authoritarianism should not be equated with the communist concept of the popular front. Cooperation between some peasant activists and the workers' left was disputed, as was the movement's attitude towards the KPP. From the perspective of the history of anti-fascism, it is therefore important to distinguish between broader cooperation among different groups against the right and authoritarian tendencies and the communist project of the popular front.

Wincenty Witos was also critical of the antisemitism of the National Party, describing it as harmful and compromising. His memoirs also contain numerous critical references to dictatorial and fascist tendencies in Europe and to authoritarian trends in Polish political life.

==== Democratic circles ====
Democratic circles not directly associated with the socialist movement were also represented by the Democratic Clubs, which began to emerge in the second half of the 1930s. The Warsaw Democratic Club, established in October 1937, brought together representatives of the intelligentsia, academia, the liberal professions, teachers, and youth circles. Its declaration opposed the existing system of government, nationalism, and antisemitism, and supported opposition to totalitarianism and democratic electoral law. The movement of Democratic Clubs subsequently developed in other cities, including Kraków and Lwów.

The Democratic Clubs are particularly significant in demonstrating that opposition to extreme nationalism and authoritarian tendencies was not limited to socialists, communists, and the peasant movement. Their milieu originated largely among the intelligentsia and sections of the democratic and former Legionary left, and their programme combined the defence of parliamentary democracy with criticism of nationalism and antisemitism. In practice, the Democratic Clubs cooperated with the PPS and the People's Party while maintaining their own political identity. In 1938, the movement developed into the Democratic Party.

=== World War II ===
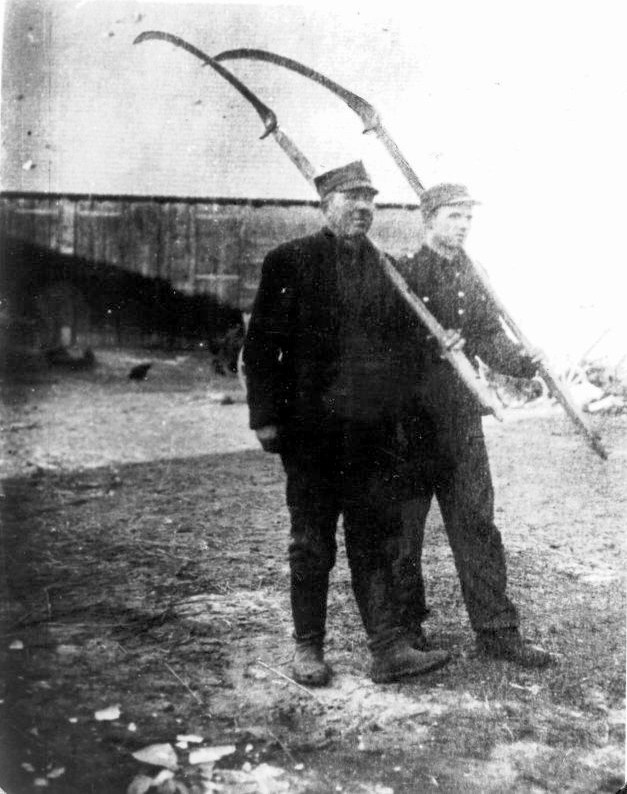
The “Red Scythemen” (Czerwoni kosynierzy), volunteer units formed on the initiative of the Polish Socialist Party during the September 1939 military operations.

Headline of issue no. 122 of Robotnik, the press organ of the Polish Socialists in August 1943. The Three Arrows, an anti-fascist symbol, are visible.

At the beginning of World War II, anti-fascist activists, including members of AS and the Class Trade Unions, joined the Workers' Brigade for the Defence of Warsaw and the Gdynia scythemen (also known as the Red Kosyniers).

During the occupation, anti-fascists fought in a number of underground organizations, including:

==== Socialist formations of the Polish anti-fascist resistance ====
- Socialist Combat Organization
- Polish People's Army
- Polish People's Independence Action
- Workers' Polish Socialist Party
- Workers' Militia of the Polish Socialist Party – Freedom, Equality, Independence
- Militia PPS-WRN
- Combat and Militia Formations of Polish Socialists
- Polish Socialists
- Czerwoni kosynierzy

==== Communist formations of the Polish anti-fascist resistance ====
- Polish Military Revolutionary Organization
- Union of Liberation Struggle
- People's Guard
- People's Army

==== Anarcho-syndicalist and syndicalist formations of the Polish anti-fascist resistance ====
- Syndicalist Organization "Freedom"
- Union of Polish Syndicalists

==== Socialist and communist formations of the Jewish anti-fascist resistance ====
- Anti-Fascist Military Organisation
- Anti-Fascist Bloc
- Jewish Combat Organization

==== Communist and socialist formations involving Poles and Polish citizens in the French and Yugoslav anti-fascist resistance ====
- Francs-tireurs et partisans – main-d'œuvre immigrée
- 5th Battalion of the 14th Central Bosnian Brigade
- Liberté Brigade

==== Other formations ====
- Home Army
  - People's Guard WRN, incorporated into the Home Army from 1942

=== Polish People's Republic ===
After World War II, anti-fascism became one of the elements of the official ideology and politics of memory of the Polish People's Republic. The authorities presented the post-war political system as the result of the victory over fascism and emphasized the memory of the struggle against Nazi Germany, while simultaneously using anti-fascist rhetoric to legitimize the communist system and delegitimize its opponents. Anti-fascism also functioned in the culture and propaganda of the Polish People's Republic as part of a broader anti-imperialist and anti-racist discourse. One example was the portrayal of apartheid in South Africa as a phenomenon resembling Nazism. Official anti-fascism did not, however, mean an absence of nationalism or antisemitism in social life; this became particularly evident during the antisemitic campaign and political purges of 1968.

=== Third Polish Republic ===
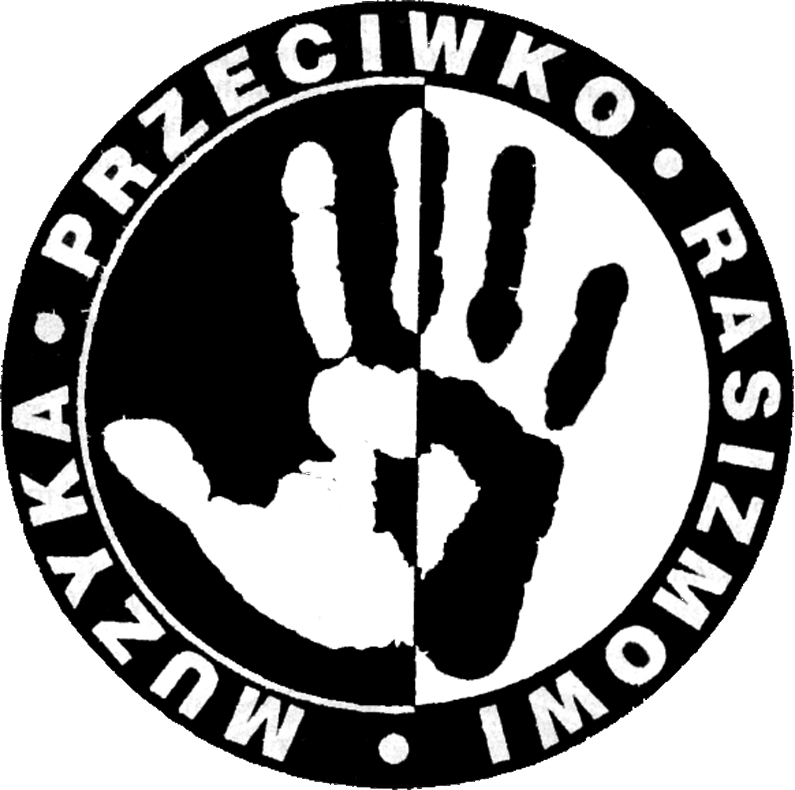
Logo of the social campaign Music Against Racism

The roots of the modern Polish anti-fascist movement can be traced to the second half of the 1980s, still during the Polish People's Republic. Early anti-fascist groups organized security at punk and reggae concerts that were attacked by skinheads. In the early 1990s, a network of informal anti-fascist groups emerged, including the Anti-Nazi Group (GAN), the Radical Anti-Fascist Action (RAAF), and the Anti-Nazi Front (ANF). Their activities were primarily associated with punk, anarchist, and other counterculture circles.

In the 1990s, the anti-fascist movement included both groups undertaking direct action against the far right and initiatives focused on information, education, and anti-racist activities. In 1993, RAAF was established; its activities included protecting demonstrations and meeting places and opposing far-right groups. At the same time, non-governmental organizations dealing with racism, xenophobia, and antisemitism developed. In 1996, the Never Again Association was established.

In the second half of the 1990s, some anti-fascist groups ceased their activities as the skinhead movement declined. Non-governmental organizations increasingly focused on educational activities, information campaigns, publishing materials, and combating racism and xenophobia.

This did not mean the disappearance of the anti-fascist milieu. During the 1990s, anti-fascism remained an important element of the activities of parts of the Polish radical left, particularly anarchist and countercultural circles. At the turn of the 21st century, some of these circles increasingly began using the term "Antifa". Around 2003, the name began to be used by the Białystok-based Antifa Wildeast group and subsequently spread among other anti-fascist groups.

In the first decade of the 21st century, anti-fascist activity increasingly took the form of loose networks of local groups known as Antifa. Their participants were primarily associated with anarchism and the far left, although people from outside these circles also became involved. Activities included organizing demonstrations, blocking far-right events, combating racism and xenophobia, and protecting public assemblies.

In 2009, the November 11 Agreement was established, bringing together organizations and groups opposed to the activities of the Polish far right. One of its main forms of activity was opposition to nationalist marches organized on 11 November in Warsaw. In subsequent years, the anti-fascist milieu included both radical anarchist groups and social organizations and initiatives whose activities focused primarily on protests, education, and anti-racist work.

After 2015, the Polish anti-fascist and anti-racist movement experienced renewed activity. New groups emerged, and people from outside traditional anarchist and subcultural circles became involved. Anti-fascist initiatives also developed in academic settings, including Student Anti-Fascist Committees. People associated with other social movements also participated in anti-racist and anti-fascist activities.

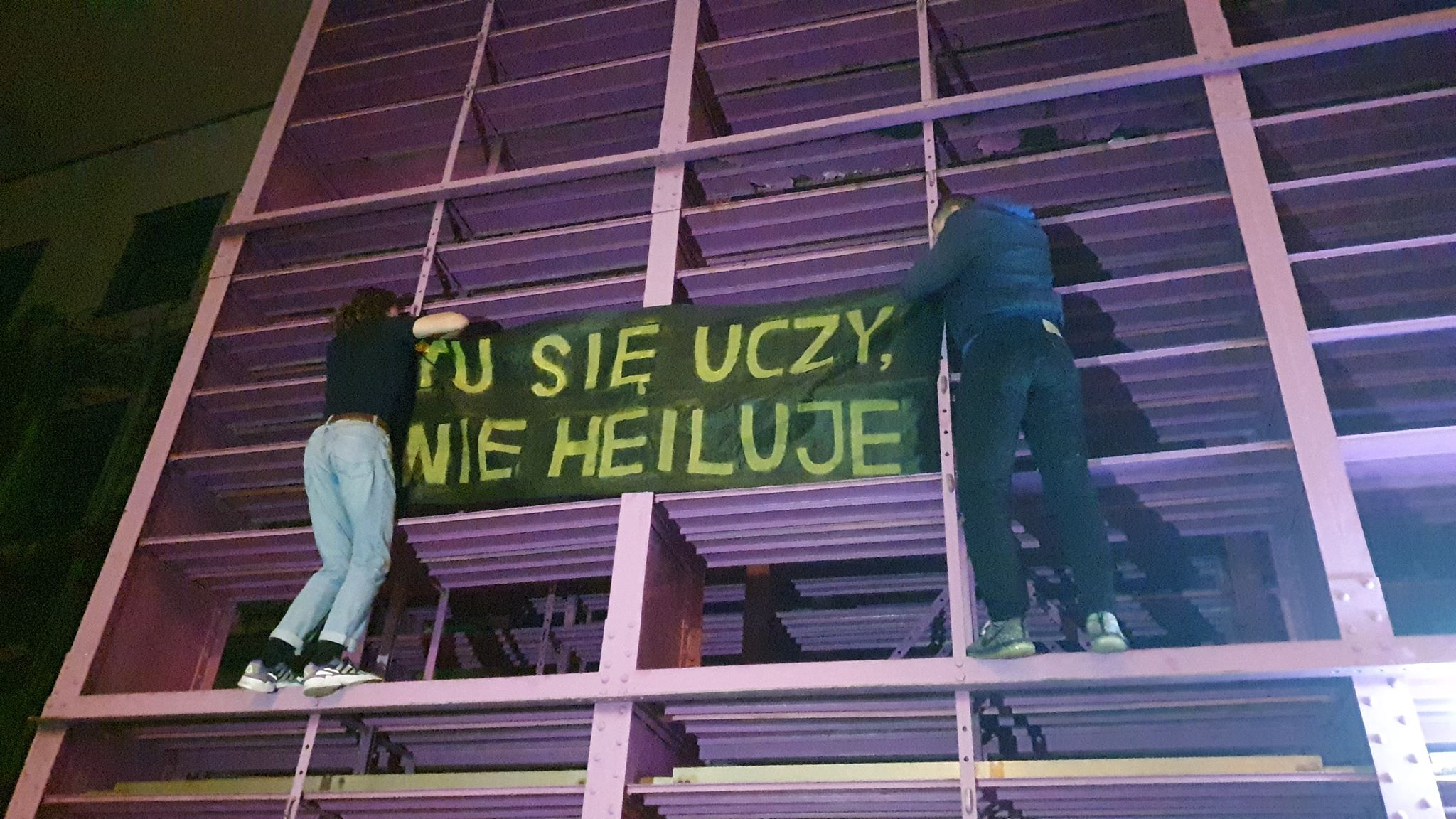
Banner of the Student Anti-Fascist Committee at the University of Warsaw (2019)

During the second half of the 2010s, anti-fascist activity also expanded beyond traditional anarchist and radical-left circles. Participants included members of Citizens of Poland and Akcja Demokracja, former opposition activists, students, and people previously uninvolved in social activism. Student Anti-Fascist Committees were also established, initially operating in Warsaw and Gdańsk. Circles associated with a new wave of Polish feminism also became involved in anti-fascist activity. According to Grzegorz Piotrowski, these new forms of activism differed from the earlier model of a movement dominated by radical-left circles, with some new participants adopting a more liberal understanding of anti-fascism.

An example of cooperation between different circles was the Anti-Fascist Coalition Zmowa Powszechna, active in Warsaw in 2017. The coalition included organizations and social initiatives with different profiles. On 11 November 2017, a gathering titled 'For Your Freedom and Ours' was held in Warsaw. It was one of the events monitored by Amnesty International during the Independence Day celebrations.

Banner of the organizations Czerwoni and Sans Visage during the 2026 Anti-Fascist March in Warsaw, 11 November 2026

Between 2022 and 2025, organizations not directly associated with the anarchist milieu also undertook activities against fascism, racism, and xenophobia. Among them, the Open Republic Association conducted a project devoted to monitoring and combating antisemitism and undertook legal interventions concerning the promotion of fascism and hate speech. Akcja Demokracja, which works more broadly on human rights and democracy, declared its participation in anti-fascist activities on 11 November in Warsaw. In 2025, a representative of Akcja Demokracja also participated in the launch of the nationwide Zatrzymaj Faszyzm (transl. Stop Fascism) initiative, bringing together non-governmental organizations, social groups, and public figures around educational activities against radicalization and hate speech.

Smaller initiatives have also continued to be organized in Poland, including by groups associated with alternative music and anarchism. Examples include the Alerta Alerta festival and 161 Fest, organized by the 161 Crew.

The contemporary Polish anti-fascist movement therefore encompasses a variety of circles, ranging from anarchist and radical-left groups to non-governmental organizations and broader social initiatives. Methods include education, informational and publishing activities, monitoring manifestations of racism and xenophobia, demonstrations, and blocking events organized by the far right. Anti-racist activity also includes cultural initiatives such as the "Music Against Racism" campaign conducted by the Never Again Association.

==== Legal provisions ====
In 1997, the Polish legislature introduced provisions in the Polish Criminal Code concerning, among other things, the public promotion of totalitarian systems and offences involving hatred on specified grounds.

The relevant legislation is the Act of 6 June 1997 – Criminal Code, subsequently amended. Articles 256 and 257 contain provisions concerning the promotion of totalitarian systems and public insults or violence motivated by national, ethnic, racial, religious or non-religious affiliation.
