= Łódź Voivodeship (1919–1939) =

Former voivodeship of Poland

Coordinates: 51°46′27″N 19°27′27″E

Łódź Voivodeship Województwo łódzkie
- Voivodeship of Poland
- 1919–1939
- Coat of arms

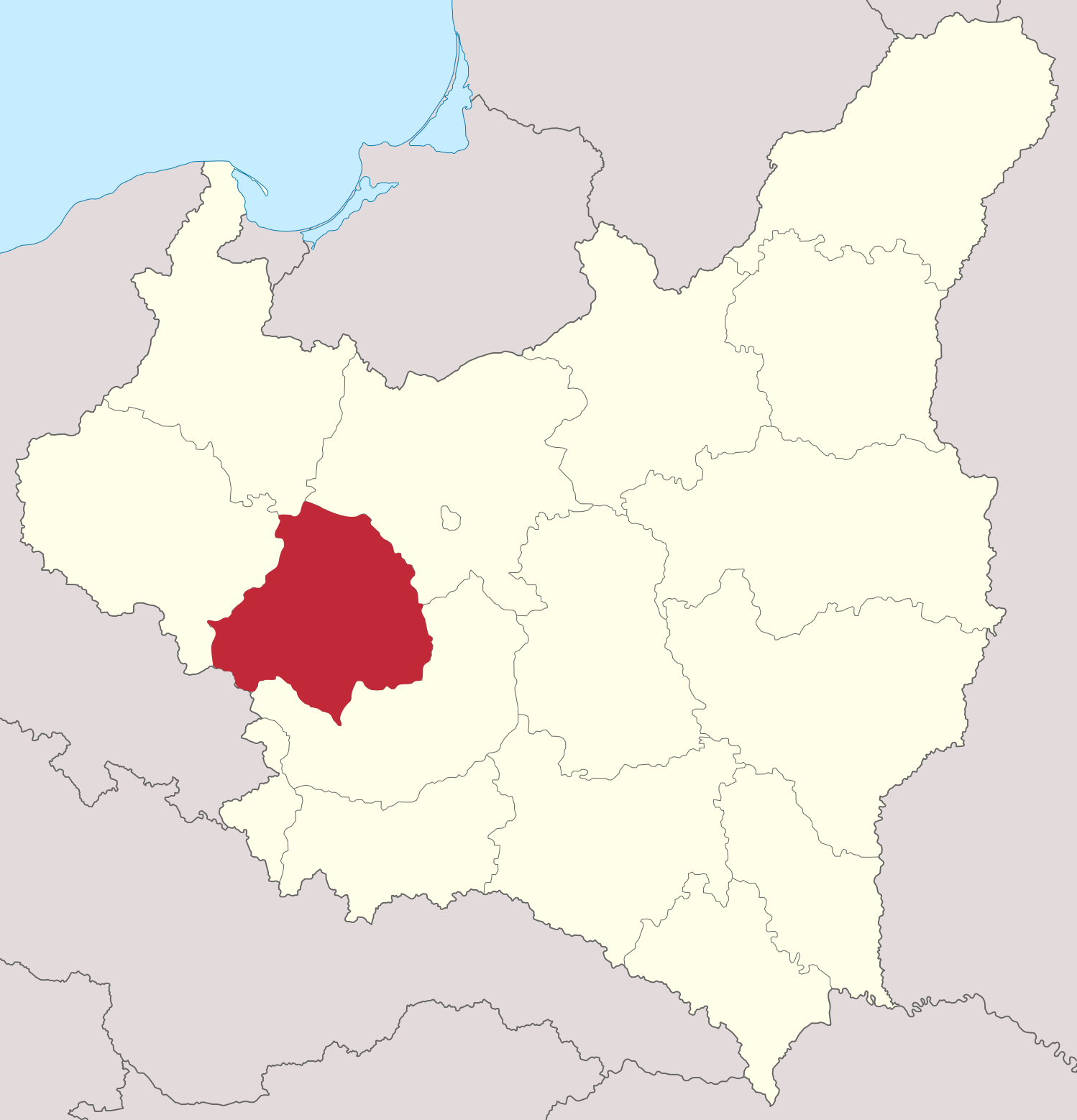
- Łódź Voivodeship (red) on the map of Second Polish Republic
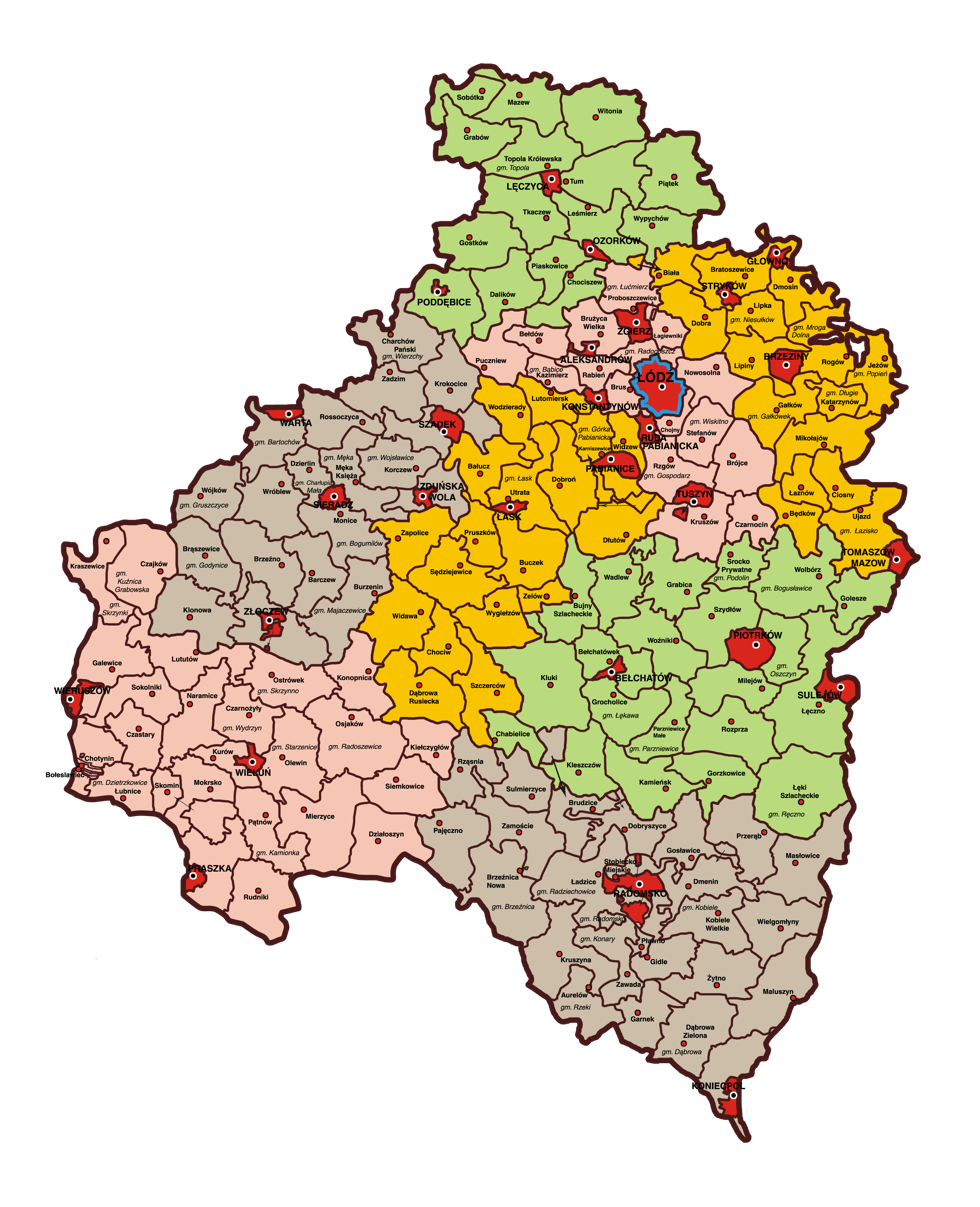
- Map of the administrative division of the Voivodeship
- Capital: Łódź
- Area
  - 1921: 19,034 km^{2} (7,349 sq mi)
  - 1939: 20,446 km^{2} (7,894 sq mi)
- Population
  - 1921: 2,252,769
  - 1931: 2,650,100
- Government
  - Type: Voivodeship
- Voivodes
  - 1919-1922: Antoni Kamieński
  - 1938-1939: Henryk Józewski
- Historical era: Interwar period
  - Established: 14 August 1919
  - Territorial changes: 1 April 1938
  - Annexed: September 1939
- Political subdivisions: 15 powiats (1939)
Preceded by	Succeeded by
Russian Empire	Reichsgau Wartheland

Łódź Voivodeship (Polish: Wojewodztwo Łódzkie) was a unit of administrative division and local government of Poland from 1919 to 1939. At the time, it covered a large portion of the mid-western part of the country, including such cities as Łódź, Piotrków Trybunalski, Sieradz and Radomsko. The capital of the Łódź Voivodeship was always Łódź, but the land that comprised it changed several times.

== Location and area ==
In early 1939, the Voivodeship's area was 20,446 square kilometers. It was located in middle Poland, bordering Poznań Voivodeship to the west, Pomorze Voivodeship to the north, Warsaw Voivodeship to the east Kielce Voivodeship to the south and Germany to the southwest. Landscape was flat, forests covered only 14.7%, with the national average 22.2% (as of January 1, 1937).

In 1938 some western counties were ceded to Poznań Voivodeship (see: Territorial changes of Polish Voivodeships on April 1, 1938). After the change, it consisted of 15 powiats (counties):

- Brzeziny county (area 1 100 km^{2}, pop. 150 900),
- Końskie county (area 1 619 km^{2}, pop. 135 900),
- Kutno county (area 922 km^{2}, pop. 108 000),
- Łask county (area 1 400 km^{2}, pop. 171 900),
- Łęczyca county (area 1 317 km^{2}, pop. 127 600),
- Łowicz county (area 1 258 km^{2}, pop. 104 800),
- city of Łódź county (powiat lodzki grodzki), (area 59 km^{2}, pop. 604 600). It was the most populous county of interbellum Poland,
- Łódź county (area 893 km^{2}, pop. 161 700),
- Opoczno county (area 1 773 km^{2}, pop. 129 900),
- Piotrków Trybunalski county (area 2 073 km^{2}, pop. 222 200),
- Radomsko county (area 2 149 km^{2}, pop. 186 400),
- Rawa Mazowiecka county (area 1 327 km^{2}, pop. 93 500),
- Sieradz county (area 1 618 km^{2}, pop. 167 400),
- Skierniewice county (area 831 km^{2}, pop. 71 000),
- Wieluń county (area 2 107 km^{2}, pop. 214 300).

The most populous cities of the Voivodeship were (population according to the 1931 Polish census):

- Łódź (pop. 604,600),
- Piotrków Trybunalski (pop. 51,300),
- Pabianice (pop. 45,700),
- Tomaszów Mazowiecki (pop. 38,000),
- Zgierz (pop. 26,600),
- Kutno (pop. 23,400),
- Radomsko (pop. 23,000).

== Population ==
According to the 1921 census the voivodeship was inhabited by 2,252,769 people, of whom by nationality 1,873,629 were Poles (83.1%), 103,484 were Germans (4.6%), 270,437 were Jews (12.0%) and 5,219 were all others (0.3%). By religion - according to the census of 1921 - 1,734,117 were Roman Catholics (77.0%), 173,546 were Protestants of all kinds (7.7%), 326,973 were Jews (14.5%) and 18,133 were all others (0.8%). The Jews and the Germans preferred to live in the cities and towns (especially the city of Łódź itself). In 1931 these two ethnic groups made up 37.6% of the Voivodeship's urban population. The illiteracy rate (in 1931) was 22.7%, slightly lower than the national average of 23.1%.

The detailed results of the 1931 census by county are presented in the table below:

Linguistic (mother tongue) and religious structure of Łódź Voivodeship according to the 1931 census
County	Pop.	Polish	%	Yiddish & Hebrew	%	German	%	Other language %	Roman Catholic	%	Jewish	%	Protestant	%	Other religion %
Łódź City	604629	356987	59.0%	191720	31.7%	53562	8.9%	0.4%	340179	56.3%	202497	33.5%	56159	9.3%	0.9%
Brzeziny	150923	115905	76.8%	24818	16.4%	10020	6.6%	0.1%	103067	68.3%	25396	16.8%	15022	10.0%	4.9%
Kalisz	195761	169363	86.5%	21625	11.0%	3821	2.0%	0.5%	160163	81.8%	23450	12.0%	10512	5.4%	0.8%
Koło	119370	101969	85.4%	9506	8.0%	7771	6.5%	0.1%	100411	84.1%	9783	8.2%	8820	7.4%	0.3%
Konin	207495	183237	88.3%	7129	3.4%	16787	8.1%	0.2%	180572	87.0%	7491	3.6%	18561	8.9%	0.4%
Łask	171885	142769	83.1%	15409	9.0%	10488	6.1%	1.8%	138595	80.6%	17004	9.9%	15366	8.9%	0.5%
Łęczyca	127585	111517	87.4%	11763	9.2%	4195	3.3%	0.1%	108277	84.9%	11937	9.4%	5951	4.7%	1.1%
Łódź County	161671	120095	74.3%	12815	7.9%	28450	17.6%	0.2%	117102	72.4%	13152	8.1%	29131	18.0%	1.4%
Piotrków	222195	192161	86.5%	20434	9.2%	8838	4.0%	0.3%	188184	84.7%	20902	9.4%	12044	5.4%	0.5%
Radomsko	186412	171787	92.2%	11734	6.3%	2601	1.4%	0.2%	169865	91.1%	12019	6.4%	3820	2.0%	0.4%
Sieradz	168051	147369	87.7%	15111	9.0%	5493	3.3%	0.0%	145689	86.7%	16042	9.5%	5714	3.4%	0.4%
Turek	101734	94370	92.8%	4155	4.1%	3176	3.1%	0.0%	92653	91.1%	4311	4.2%	4528	4.5%	0.2%
Wieluń	214299	200823	93.7%	13216	6.2%	113	0.1%	0.1%	196813	91.8%	14511	6.8%	2276	1.1%	0.3%
Total	2632010	2108352	80.1%	359435	13.7%	155315	5.9%	0.3%	2041570	77.6%	378495	14.4%	187904	7.1%	0.9%

== Industry ==
The Voivodeship's biggest industrial center was the city of Łódź with its suburbs. Apart from this, it lacked other industrial cities. The construction of a huge public works program, called Centralny Okręg Przemysłowy, which started in the second half of the 1930s, missed this part of Poland. Railroad density was 4.8 per 100 km^{2}, while the national average was 5.2. The biggest rail hubs were Koluszki, Kutno, Łowicz, Skierniewice, Zduńska Wola and Łódź.

== Voivodes ==
- Antoni Kamieński 19 November 1919 – 1 March 1922
- Paweł Garapich 1 March 1922 – 14 February 1923 (p.o.)
- Marian Rembowski 9 March 1923 – 12 August 1924
- Paweł Garapich 12 August 1924 – 30 December 1924
- Ludwik Darowski 1925 – 22 June 1926
- Jan Ossoliński June 1926 – July 1926 (p.o.)
- Władysław Jaszczołt June 1926 – 31 January 1933
- Aleksander Hauke-Nowak 31 January 1933 – 13 April 1938
- Henryk Józewski 13 April 1938 – 6 September 1939

== See also ==
- Poland's current Łódź Voivodeship
- Territorial changes of Polish Voivodeships on April 1, 1938
