= Lublin Voivodeship (1919–1939) =

Former voivodeship of Poland

Coordinates: 51°14′00″N 22°34′00″E

Lublin Voivodeship Wojewodztwo lubelskie
- Voivodeship of Poland
- 1919–1939
- Coat of arms

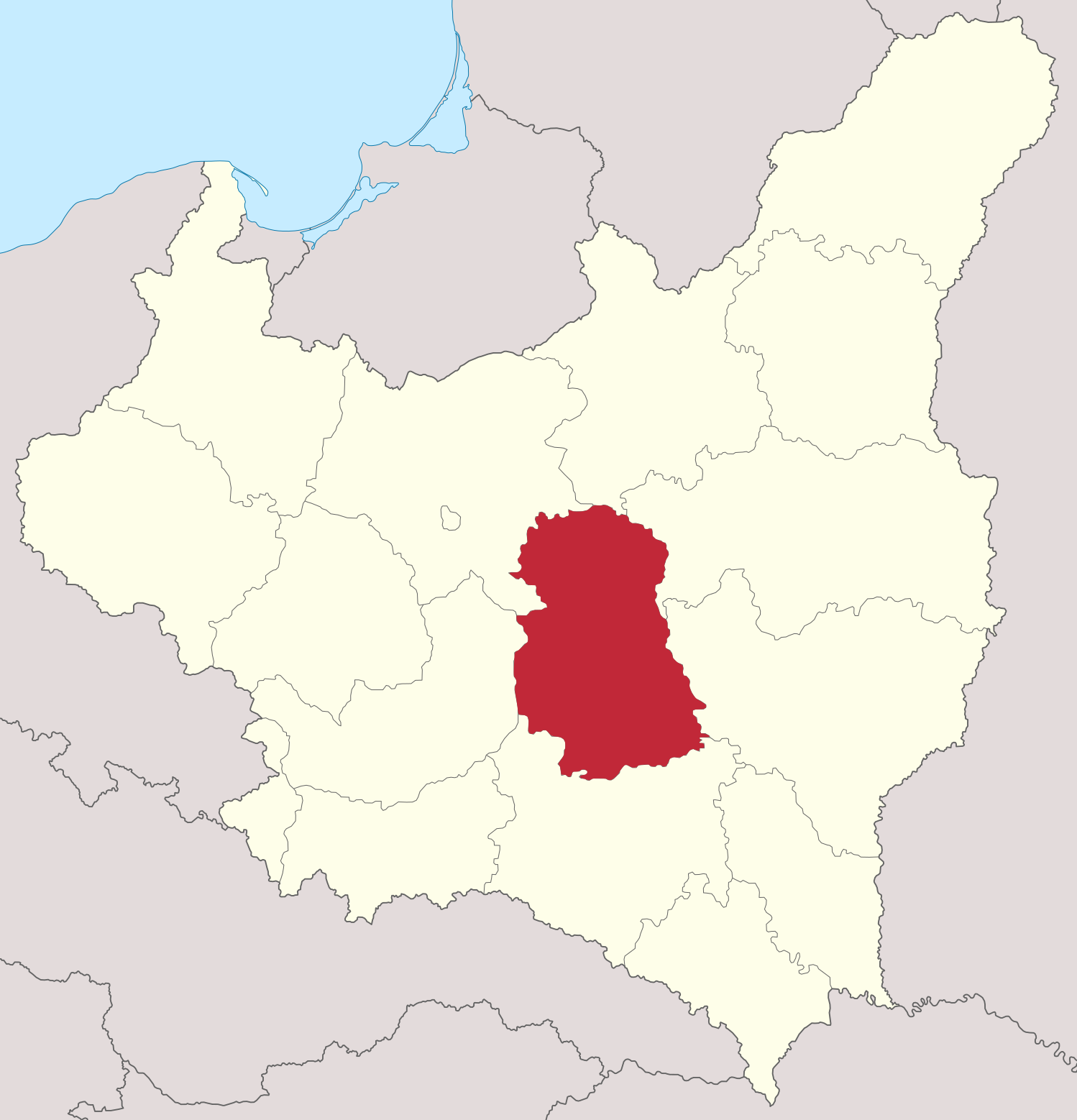
- Location of the Lublin Voivodeship (red) within the Second Polish Republic, 1938.
- Capital: Lublin
- Area
  - 1921: 31,123 km^{2} (12,017 sq mi)
  - 1939: 26,555 km^{2} (10,253 sq mi)
- Population
  - 1921: 2,087,951
  - 1931: 2,116,200
- Government
  - Type: Voivodeship
- Voivodes
  - 1919–1926: Stanisław Moskalewski
  - 1937–1939: Jerzy Albin de Tramecourt
- History
  - Established: 14 August 1919
  - Territorial changes: 1 April 1938
  - Annexed by Germany: September 1939
- Political subdivisions: 16 powiats, 29 cities
Preceded by	Succeeded by
Russian Empire	General Government

Lublin Voivodeship (Polish: Województwo Lubelskie) was a unit of administrative division of the Second Polish Republic between the two world wars, in the years 1919–1939. The province's capital and biggest city was Lublin.

== Location and area ==
The Voivodeship was founded by the decree of Polish Parliament Sejm of 14 August 1919. In the years 1919–1939 (unlike today), Lublin Voivodeship covered the central part of interwar Poland – the heartland of the country – bordering Białystok Voivodeship (1919–39) to the north, Warsaw Voivodeship and Kielce Voivodeship to the west, Lwów Voivodeship to the south and Polesie Voivodeship as well as Volhynian Voivodeship to the east. Its area, after April 1, 1938 (see: Territorial changes of Polish Voivodeships on April 1, 1938) was 26,555 km^{2}. Landscape was flat and hilly in the south, forests covered only 16.6% of the area (with nation's average of 22.2%, as for January 1, 1937).

== Demographics ==
According to the Polish census of 1921 which was the First General Census in the Second Polish Republic following World War I (conducted by the Main Bureau of Statistics, see originals), the population of Lublin Voivodeship could be categorized by both location and religious beliefs in the following way.

#	County	Roman Catholic	Eastern Orthodox	Jewish	Other
1	Biała Podl.	37,239 (62.6%)	9,551 (16%)	11 550 (19.4%)	1 180 (2%)
2	Biłgoraj	65,889 (72.4%)	15,883 (17.5%)	9,056 (9.9%)	188 (0.2%)
3	Chełm	68,770 (56.6%)	24,701 (20.3%)	19,912 (16.4%)	8,092 (6.7%)
4	Garwolin	117,391 (85.2%)	126 (0.1%)	17,772 (12.9%)	2,488 (1.8%)
5	Hrubieszów	50,735 (48.9%)	38,468 (37%)	13,967 (13.5%)	671 (0.6%)
6	Janów	117,368 (89.3%)	697 (0.5%)	13,407 (10.2%)	30 (0.02%)
7	Konstantynów	53,667 (82.5%)	4,012 (6.2%)	7,241 (11.1%)	135 (0.2%)
8	Krasnystaw	102,016 (87.1%)	4,149 (3.5%)	10,493 (9.0%)	422 (0.4%)
9	Lubartów	83,732 (87%)	1,197 (1.2%)	9,669 (10%)	1,645 (1.7%)
10	Lublin (city)	55,610 (58.9%)	514 (0.5%)	37,337 (39.5%)	951 (1%)
11	Lublin (distr.)	128,303 (91.7%)	910 (0.7%)	9,608 (6.9%)	1,079 (0.8%)
12	Łuków	107,604 (87.3%)	932 (0.8%)	14,185 (11.5%)	552 (0.4%)
13	Puławy	129,281 (86.8%)	206 (0.1%)	19,296 (12.9%)	238 (0.2%)
14	Radzyń	70,976 (80.3%)	1,862 (2.1%)	14,765 (16.7%)	778 (0.9%)
15	Siedlce	76,446 (77.6%)	851 (0.9%)	18,821 (19.1%)	2,345 (2.4%)
16	Sokołów	67,224 (88.4%)	420 (0.6%)	8,294 (10.9%)	141 (0.2%)
17	Tomaszów	57,869 (62.4%)	22,389 (24.1%)	12,154 (13.1%)	397 (0.4%)
18	Węgrów	68,985 (83.3%)	185 (0.2%)	9,325 (11.3%)	4,277 (5.2%)
19	Włodawa	40,881 (53.3%)	20,104 (26.2%)	13,562 (17.7%)	2,171 (2.8%)
20	Zamość	119,769 (84%)	5,441 (3.8%)	17,225 (12.1%)	179 (0.1%)
	TOTAL	1,619,755 (77.6%)	152,598 (7.3%)	287,639 (13.8%)	27,959 (1.3%)

Population breakdown by religious denomination in the 1931 national census:

#	County	Roman Catholic	Eastern Orthodox	Jewish	Other
1	Biała Podl.	82,647 (71.1%)	18,192 (15.6%)	14,288 (12.3%)	1,139 (1%)
2	Biłgoraj	82,614 (70.6%)	20,913 (17.9%)	12,938 (11.1%)	486 (0.4%)
3	Chełm	88,488 (54.5%)	37,530 (23.1%)	22,852 (14.1%)	13,470 (8.3%)
4	Garwolin	139,128 (87%)	67	18,741 (11.7%)	2,006 (1.3%)
5	Hrubieszów	63,365 (48.8%)	49,128 (37.8%)	15 785 (12.1%)	1,679 (1.3%)
6	Janów	135,182 (88.5%)	1,159 (0.8%)	15,317 (10%)	1,060 (0.7%)
7	Krasnystaw	113,442 (84.6%)	4,853 (3.6%)	12,127 (9.0%)	3,737 (2.8%)
8	Lubartów	94,356 (87.4%)	1,544 (1.4%)	9,652 (8.9%)	2,439 (2.3%)
9	Lublin (city)	71,542 (63.7%)	703 (0.6%)	38,937 (34.7)	1103 (1%)
10	Lublin (distr.)	149,192 (91.2%)	125 (0.1%)	12,049 (7.4%)	2,136 (1.3%)
11	Łuków	113,549 (88%)	76	14,736 (11.4%)	722 (0.6%)
12	Puławy	149,060 (86.5%)	182 (0.1%)	21,949 (12.7%)	1,076 (0.6%)
13	Radzyń	80,520 (81.3%)	1,840 (1.9%)	15,548 (15.7%)	1,181 (1.2%)
14	Siedlce	125,018 (82.6%)	657 (0.4%)	23,069 (15.2%)	2,667 (1.8%)
15	Sokołów	74,941 (89.3%)	145 (0.2%)	8,334 (9.9%)	529 (0.6%)
16	Tomaszów	73,021 (60.3%)	33,059 (27.3%)	14,204 (11.7%)	840 (0.7%)
17	Węgrów	76,511 (86.2%)	40	8,888 (10%)	3,349 (3.8%)
18	Włodawa	57,939 (51%)	33,382 (29.4%)	18,188 (16%)	4,057 (3.6%)
19	Zamość	125,249 (83.8%)	6,778 (4.5%)	16,738 (11.2%)	783 (0.5%)
	TOTAL	1,895,764 (76.9%)	210,373 (8.5%)	314,340 (12.8%)	44,459 (1.8%)

=== Ethnic groups ===
According to the 1931 Polish census, the total population was 2,464,936. Poles made up 85.6% of population, Jews 10.5%, and Ukrainians (in the east and south) 3%. The Jews preferred to live in the cities and towns, especially in Lublin itself.

Due to ruthless Russification policies throughout the preceding century leading to general absence of schools in the Voivodeship, 24.6% of population was still illiterate as of 1931, although rapidly decreasing from 46.8% in 1921.

Polish and Ukrainian population in Lublin Voivodeship according to the 1931 census
County	Pop.	Ukrainian & Ruthenian	%	Polish	%	Orthodox & Uniate	%	Roman Catholic	%
Biała Podlaska	116266	2250	1.9%	106467	91.6%	18715	16.1%	82647	71.1%
Biłgoraj	116951	2727	2.3%	106100	90.7%	21055	18.0%	82614	70.6%
Chełm	162340	13103	8.1%	120805	74.4%	37875	23.3%	88488	54.5%
Garwolin	159942	68	0.0%	140024	87.5%	147	0.1%	139128	87.0%
Hrubieszów	129957	19066	14.7%	101394	78.0%	49802	38.3%	63365	48.8%
Janów	152718	1009	0.7%	142113	93.1%	1206	0.8%	135182	88.5%
Krasnystaw	134159	1054	0.8%	123204	91.8%	4886	3.6%	113442	84.6%
Lubartów	107991	628	0.6%	99918	92.5%	1583	1.5%	94356	87.4%
Lublin City	112285	227	0.2%	73534	65.5%	863	0.8%	71542	63.7%
Lublin County	163502	57	0.0%	151946	92.9%	186	0.1%	149192	91.2%
Łuków	129083	28	0.0%	120991	93.7%	118	0.1%	113549	88.0%
Puławy	172267	133	0.1%	150022	87.1%	308	0.2%	149060	86.5%
Radzyń	99089	326	0.3%	84174	84.9%	1874	1.9%	80520	81.3%
Siedlce	151411	132	0.1%	129414	85.5%	709	0.5%	125018	82.6%
Sokołów	83949	39	0.0%	75376	89.8%	176	0.2%	74941	89.3%
Tomaszów	121124	20752	17.1%	86612	71.5%	33642	27.8%	73021	60.3%
Węgrów	88788	34	0.0%	79709	89.8%	83	0.1%	76511	86.2%
Włodawa	113566	9663	8.5%	86866	76.5%	33585	29.6%	57939	51.0%
Zamość	149548	2532	1.7%	130530	87.3%	6942	4.6%	125249	83.8%
Total in Lublin Voivodeship	2464936	73828	3.0%	2109199	85.6%	213755	8.7%	1895764	76.9%

== Industry ==
The Voivodeship's biggest industrial center was the city of Lublin. Other than that, it lacked significant industry centers. In mid-1930s Polish government started a huge public works program, called Centralny Okręg Przemysłowy, which was a great boost to overpopulated and poor counties. It covered southwestern part of the Voivodeship, with the town of Kraśnik. The railroad density was 4.0 km. per 100 km^{2}. (with total length of railroads 1 236 km.).

== Cities and administrative divisions ==
Lublin Voivodeship in mid-1939 consisted of 16 powiats (counties) 29 cities and towns and 228 villages. The counties were:

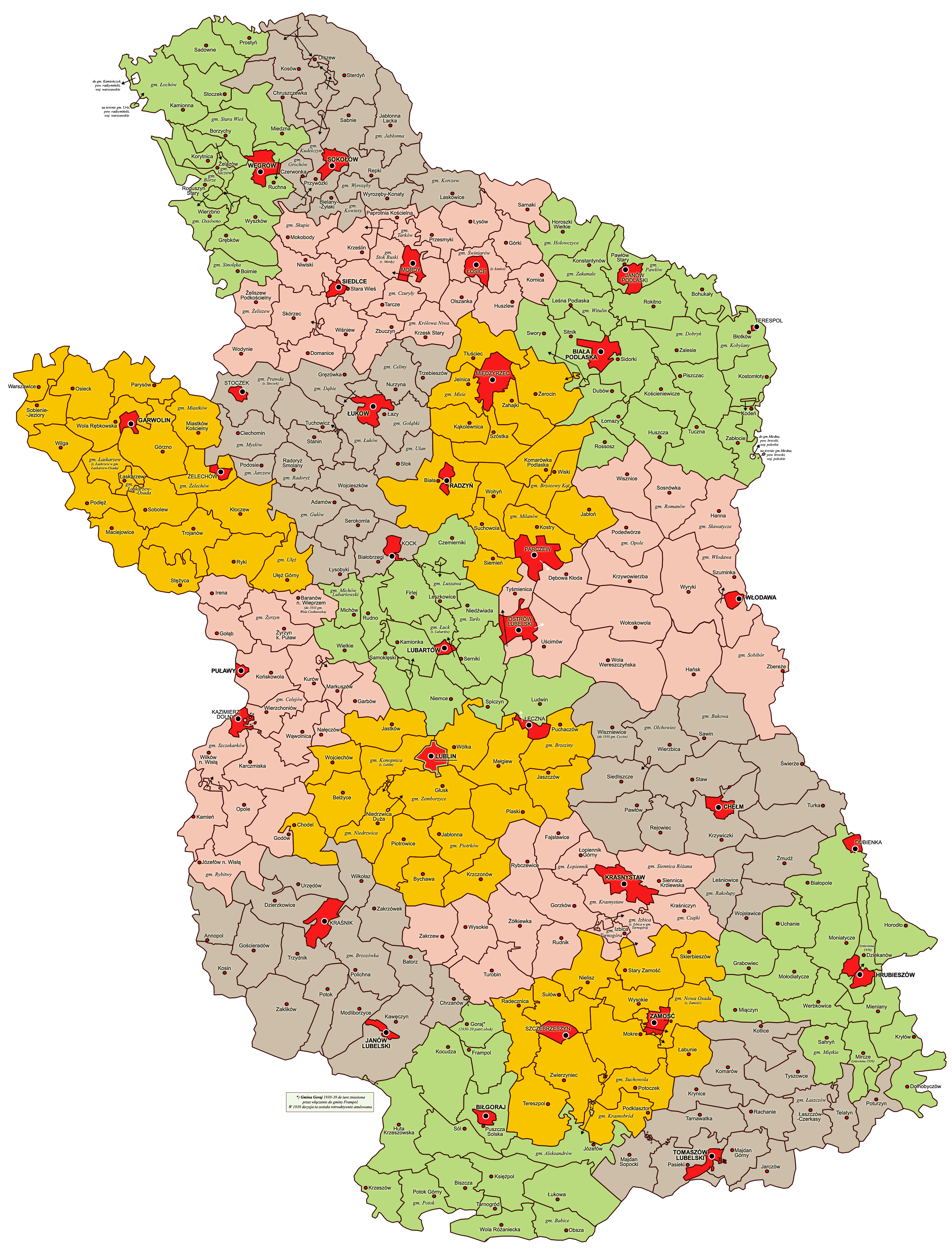
- Biała Podlaska county (area 2,122 km^{2}, population 116,000)
- Biłgoraj county (area 1,720 km^{2}, population 116,900)
- Chełm county (area 1,975 km^{2}, population 162,300)
- Hrubieszów county (area 1,575 km^{2}, population 130,000)
- Janów Lubelski county (area 1,960 km^{2}, population 152,700)
- Krasnystaw county (area 1,521 km^{2}, population 134,200)
- Lubartów county (area 1,389 km^{2}, population 108,000)
- City of Lublin county (area 30 km^{2}, population 112,300)
- Lublin county (area 1,889 km^{2}, population 163,500)
- Łuków county (area 1,762 km^{2}, population 129,100)
- Puławy county (area 1,618 km^{2}, population 156,500)
- Radzyń Podlaski county (area 1,621 km^{2}, population 99,100)
- Siedlce county (area 1,988 km^{2}, population 151,400)
- Tomaszów Lubelski county (area 1,397 km^{2}, population 121,100)
- Włodawa county (area 2,326 km^{2}, population 113,600)
- Zamość county (area 1,662 km^{2}, population 149,500)

According to the 1931 census, biggest cities were:

- Lublin (pop. 112,300)
- Siedlce (pop. 36,900)
- Chełm (pop. 29,100)
- Zamość (pop. 24,700)
- Biała Podlaska (pop. 17,400)
- Miedzyrzec Podlaski (pop. 16,800)
- Łuków (pop. 14,000)
- Hrubieszów (pop. 13,200)
- Kraśnik (pop. 12,200)
- Puławy (pop. 12,100)

== Voivodes ==
- Stanisław Moskalewski, 17 November 1919 – 25 October 1926
- Antoni Remiszewski, 3 November 1926 – 29 September 1930
- Bolesław Świdziński, 29 September 1930 – 30 January 1933 (acting till 1 April 1932)
- Józef Rożniecki, 31 January 1933 – 8 September 1937
- Jerzy Albin de Tramecourt, 8 September 1937 – 17 September 1939

== See also ==
- Poland's modern-day Lublin Voivodeship
