= Territorial changes of Polish Voivodeships on 1 April 1938 =

On 1 April 1938, borders of several western and central Voivodeships of the Second Polish Republic changed considerably. This included such Voivodeships as Pomerania, Poznan, Warsaw, Lodz, Bialystok, Lublin and Kielce. Pomerania gained most, while Bialystok lost most. This is the alphabetical list of powiats (counties), which were then moved from one Voivodeship to another:

Administrative division of the Republic in 1922

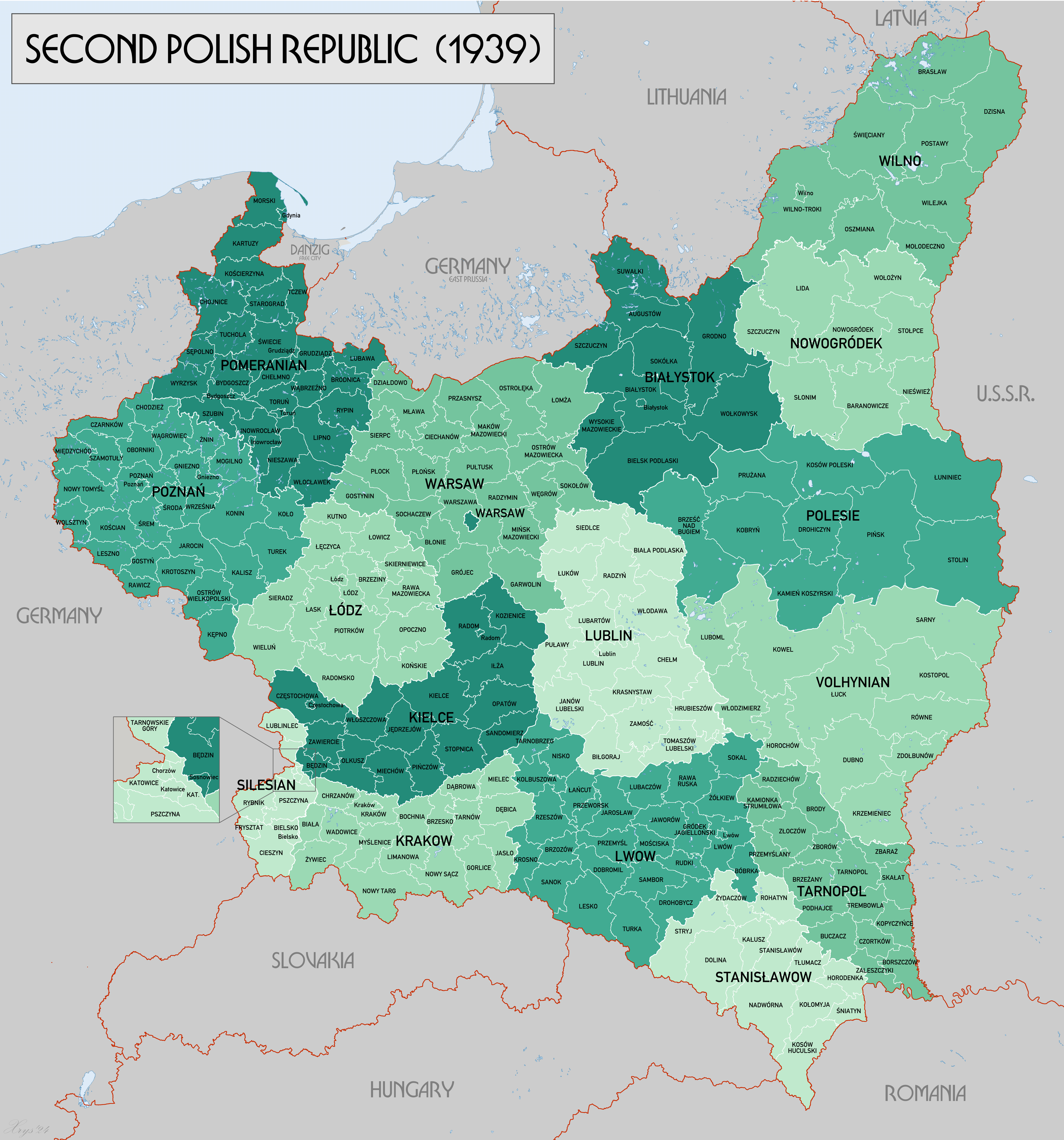
The Republic on 31 August 1939

- powiat bydgoski - Bydgoszcz County (from poznanskie to pomorskie),
- powiat dzialdowski - Działdowo County (from pomorskie to warszawskie),
- powiat garwolinski - Garwolin County (from lubelskie to warszawskie),
- powiat inowroclawski - Inowrocław County (from poznanskie to pomorskie),
- powiat kaliski - Kalisz County (from lodzkie to poznanskie),
- powiat kolski - Koło County (from lodzkie to poznanskie),
- powiat konecki - Końskie County (from kieleckie to lodzkie),
- powiat koninski - Konin County (from lodzkie to poznanskie),
- powiat kutnowski - Kutno County (from warszawskie to lodzkie),
- powiat lipnowski - Lipno County (from warszawskie to pomorskie),
- powiat lomzynski - Łomża County (from bialostockie to warszawskie),
- powiat lowicki - Łowicz County (from warszawskie to lodzkie),
- powiat nieszawski - Nieszawa county (from warszawskie to pomorskie),
- powiat opoczynski - Opoczno County (from kieleckie to lodzkie),
- powiat ostrolecki - Ostrołęka county (from bialostockie to warszawskie),
- powiat ostrowski - Ostrów Mazowiecka county (from bialostockie to warszawskie),
- powiat rawski - Rawa Mazowiecka county (from warszawskie to lodzkie),
- powiat rypinski - Rypin county (from warszawskie to pomorskie),
- powiat skierniewicki - Skierniewice county (from warszawskie to lodzkie),
- powiat sokolowski - Sokołów Podlaski county (from lubelskie to warszawskie),
- powiat szubinski - Szubin county (from poznanskie to pomorskie),
- powiat turecki - Turek County (from lodzkie to poznanskie),
- powiat wegrowski - Węgrów County (from lubelskie to warszawskie),
- powiat wloclawski - Włocławek county (from warszawskie to pomorskie),
- powiat wyrzyski - Wyrzysk county (from poznanskie to pomorskie).
