= Warsaw Voivodeship (1919–1939) =

Former voivodeship of Poland

Coordinates: 52°15′02″N 21°00′37″E

Warsaw Voivodeship Województwo warszawskie
- Voivodeship of Poland
- 1919–1939
- Coat of arms

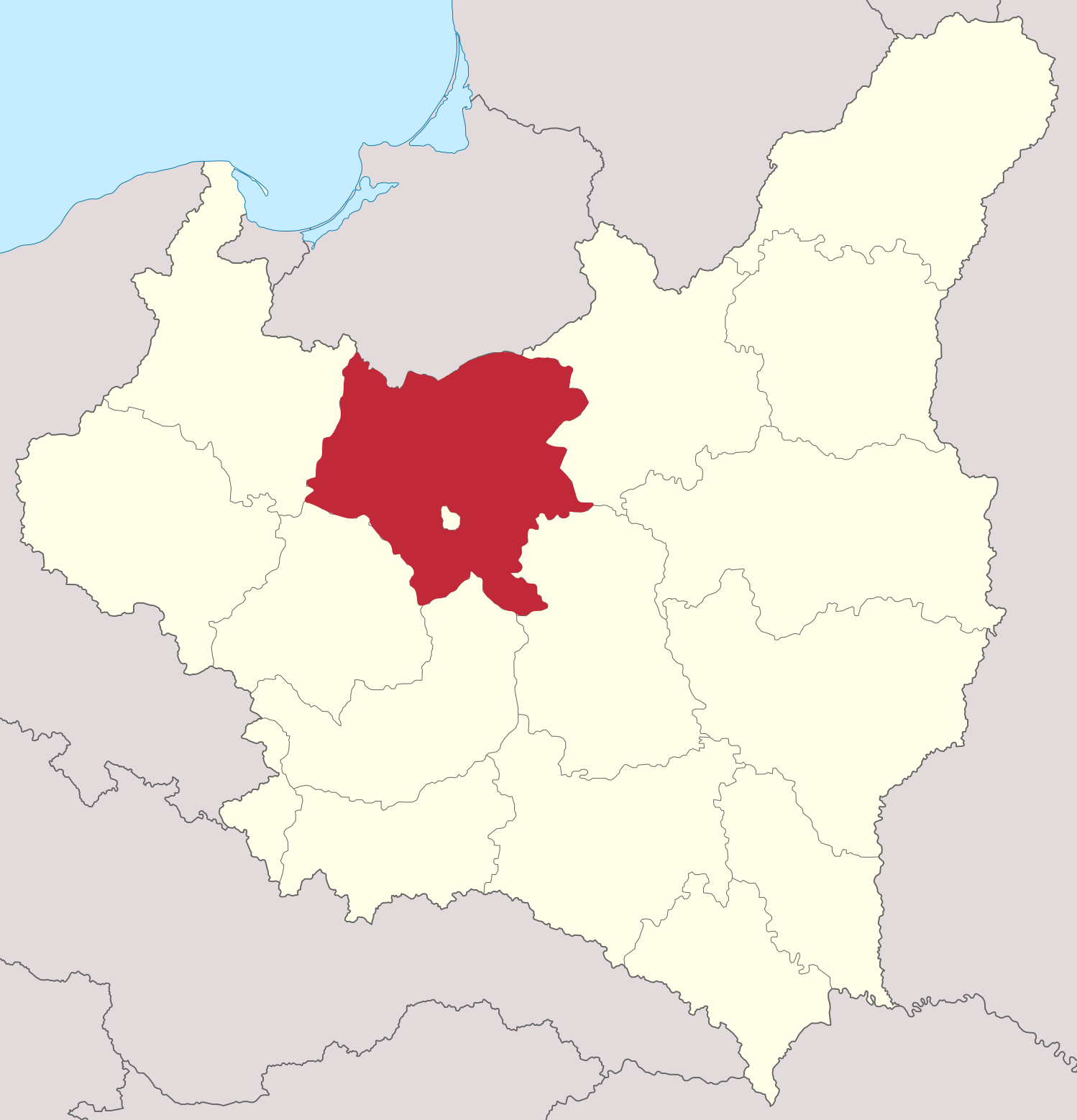
- Warsaw Voivodeship (red) on the map of Second Polish Republic
- Capital: Warsaw
- Area
  - 1921: 29,342 km^{2} (11,329 sq mi)
  - 1939: 31,656 km^{2} (12,222 sq mi)
- Population
  - 1921: 2,112,798
  - 1931: 2,460,900
- Government
  - Type: Voivodeship
- Voivodes
  - 1919-1927: Władysław Sołtan
  - 1938-1939: Jerzy Paciorkowski
- Historical era: Interwar period
  - Established: 14 August 1919
  - Territorial changes: 1 April 1938
  - Annexed by Germany: September 1939
- Political subdivisions: 22 powiats, 53 cities
Preceded by	Succeeded by
Warsaw Governorate	General Government; Province of East Prussia

Warsaw Voivodeship (Polish: województwo warszawskie) was a voivodeship of Poland in the years 1919–1939. Its capital and biggest city was Warsaw.

== Location and area ==
In the years 1919–1939, Warsaw Voivodeship covered north-central part of Poland, bordering East Prussia to the north, Pomorze Voivodeship and Łódź Voivodeship to the west, Kielce Voivodeship to the south and both Lublin Voivodeship and Białystok Voivodeship to the east. Its area, after April 1, 1938, was 31 656 km² (see: Territorial changes of Polish Voivodeships on 1 April 1938). The landscape was flat. Forests covered only 11.4% of the area, compared to the national average of 22.2%, as of January 1, 1937.

== Population ==
According to the 1931 Polish census, the population was 2 460 900. Poles made up 88.3% of population, Jews - 9.7% and Germans - 1.6%. The Jews and the Germans preferred to live in the cities and towns, especially in Warsaw itself. In Warsaw, in 1931, only 70.7% of population was Polish, with 28.3% Jews. In the whole Voivodeship, 21.8% of the population was illiterate as of 1931.

== Industry ==
The Voivodeship's biggest industrial center was the city of Warsaw, together with towns in its suburbs (Żyrardów, Pruszków, Piaseczno). Warsaw was one of key centers of Polish industry, with numerous factories of various kinds. It was also the biggest city of the country. The Voivodeship's railroad density was 5.2 km. per 100 km² (with total length of railroads 1 548 km.)

== Cities and administrative divisions ==
Administrative division in 1938

Warsaw Voivodeship in mid-1939 consisted of 22 powiats (counties), 53 cities and towns and 293 villages. The counties were:

- Błonie county (area 1,074 km², pop. 143,900),
- Ciechanów county (area 1,209 km², pop. 78,800),
- Działdowo county (area 842 km², pop. 42,700),
- Garwolin county (area 2,044 km², pop. 175,700),
- Gostynin county (area 1,147 km², pop. 81,600),
- Grójec county (area 1,699 km², pop. 132,400),
- Łomża county (area 2,657 km², pop. 168,200),
- Maków Mazowiecki county (area 1,136 km², pop. 65,600),
- Mińsk Mazowiecki county (area 1,228 km², pop. 111,100),
- Mława county (area 1,486 km², pop. 103,100),
- Ostrołęka county (area 2,281 km², pop. 112,600),
- Ostrów Mazowiecka county (area 1,467 km², pop. 99,800),
- Płock county (area 1,485 km², pop. 128,100),
- Płońsk county (area 1,289 km², pop. 81,400),
- Przasnysz county (area 1,410 km², pop. 69,100),
- Pułtusk county (area 1,527 km², pop. 118,100),
- Radzymin county (area 1,076 km², pop. 97,500),
- Sierpc county (area 1,204 km², pop. 84,900),
- Sochaczew county (area 1,052 km², pop. 75,200),
- Sokołów Podlaski county (area 1,276 km², pop. 83,900),
- Warsaw county (area 1,766 km², pop. 318,500),
- Węgrów county (area 1,301 km², pop. 88,800).

The city of Warsaw, with the area of 141 km² (134 km² of built-up area plus 7 km² of the Vistula river) and population of 1 179 500 (as of 1931) was considered a separate unit, just like any other Voivodeship. It was divided into 4 counties. These were:

- South Warsaw county (area 50 km², pop. 307,100),
- North Warsaw county (area 31 km², pop. 478,200),
- Warsaw-Praga county (area 43 km², pop. 176,100),
- Central Warsaw county (area 10 km², pop. 218,100). It was the smallest and the most densely populated county in Poland in the 1930s. Population density there was 22 415 persons per km².

The biggest cities of the Voivodeship were (population according to the 1931 Polish census):

- Warsaw (pop. 1,179,500),
- Płock (pop. 33,000),
- Żyrardów (pop. 25,100),
- Łomża (pop. 25,000),
- Pruszków (pop. 23,700),
- Mława (pop. 19,600),
- Ostrów Mazowiecka (pop. 17,600),
- Pułtusk (pop. 16,800),
- Grodzisk Mazowiecki (pop. 15,700),
- Otwock (pop. 15,100),
- Ostrołęka (pop. 14,100),
- Wolomin (pop. 14,100),
- Ciechanów (pop. 13,900).

== Voivodes ==
- Władysław Sołtan 19 November 1919 – 24 November 1927
- Stanisław Twardo 28 November 1927 – 3 July 1934
- Bronisław Nakoniecznikow-Klukowski 3 July 1934 – 5 February 1938
- Jerzy Paciorkowski 22 January 1938 – September 1939 (acting till 5 February 1938)

== See also ==
- Poland's current Masovian and Kuyavian-Pomeranian Voivodeships
- Territorial changes of Polish Voivodeships on April 1, 1938
