= Flag and coat of arms of Łódź =

Flag of Łódź

The flag of Łódź features the two heraldic tinctures of the coat of arms of Łódź: or over gules. In the centre the coat of arms itself appears, depicting a boat, since łódź in Polish means "boat" (thus, this is an example of canting arms).
