= Poznań Voivodeship (1919–1939) =

Former voivodeship of Poland

Poznań Voivodeship Województwo Poznańskie
- Voivodeship of Poland
- 1919–1939
- Coat of arms

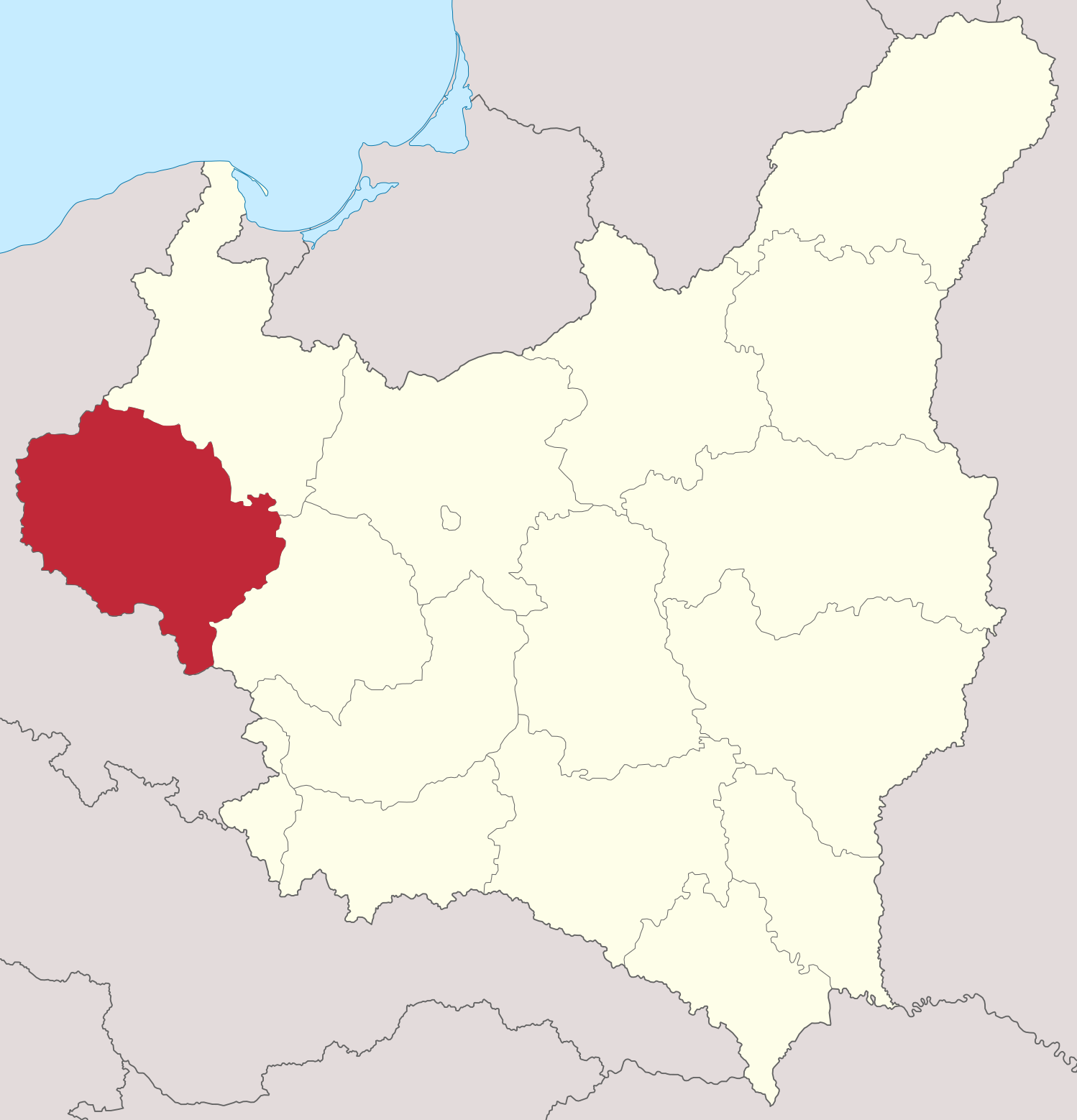
- Location of Poznań Voivodeship (red) within the Second Republic of Poland (1938).
- Capital: Poznań
- Area
  - 1921: 26,528 km^{2} (10,243 sq mi)
  - 1931: 26,528 km^{2} (10,243 sq mi)
  - 1939: 28,089 km^{2} (10,845 sq mi)
- Population
  - 1921: 1,967,865
  - 1931: 2,339,600
- Government
  - Type: Voivodeship
- Voivodes
  - Aug–October 1919: Wojciech Trąmpczyński
  - September 1939: Cyryl Ratajski
- Historical era: Interwar period
  - Established: 1 August 1919
  - Territorial changes: 1 April 1938
  - Annexed: 12 September 1939
Preceded by	Succeeded by
Province of Posen	Reichsgau Wartheland

Poznań Voivodeship (Polish: Województwo Poznańskie) was a unit of administrative division and local government in Poland in the years 1919–1939, created after World War I from the Prussian-German province of Poznań (Province of Posen). The borders were changed in 1939: the city of Bydgoszcz passed to the Pomeranian Voivodeship, but some eastern areas were included (see Territorial changes of Polish Voivodeships on April 1, 1938).

During World War II, it was occupied by Nazi Germany and annexed as Reichsgau Wartheland "(Reich province of the Land of the Warta River)".

== Area and counties ==
Between April 1, 1938 and September 1, 1939, the Voivodeship's area was 28,089 km^{2}, and its population - 2,339 600 (according to the 1931 Polish census). It consisted of 29 powiats (the highest number in Poland, however, most of them were very small, both in area and population), 100 towns (the highest number in Poland) and 237 villages. Railroad density was high, with 10.1 km. per 100 km^{2} (total length of railroads within the Voivodeship's area was 2684 km, the highest in the whole country). Forests covered 19.8% of the Voivodeship, which was lower than the national average (in 1937 the average was 22.2%).

Poznańskie Voivodeship was one of the richest and best developed in interwar Poland. With numerous cities and well-developed rail, it also was a breadbasket of the country, its highly efficient agriculture was well-mechanized. The city of Poznań was a big industrial center, as well as a key railroad junction. Only 7.6% of population was illiterate, which was much lower than the national average of 23.1% (as of 1931). Poles made up the majority of the population (90.5%), with 9.2% Germans and 0.3% Jews.

After World War I the number of Germans was 224,254 in 1926 and 203,135 in 1934.

This is the list of the Poznań Voivodeship counties as for August 31, 1939:

- Chodzież county (area 893 km^{2}, pop. 44,500),
- Czarnków county (area 919 km^{2}, pop. 43,300),
- city of Gniezno county (area 18 km^{2}, pop. 30,700),
- Gniezno county (area 1,126 km^{2}, pop. 57,300),
- Gostyń county (area 701 km^{2}, pop. 55,900),
- Jarocin county (area 1,124 km^{2}, pop. 87,500),
- Kalisz county (area 1,478 km^{2}, pop. 196,700),
- Kępno county (area 1,179 km^{2}, pop. 86,900),
- Koło county (area 1,097 km^{2}, pop. 109,800),
- Konin county (area 2,152 km^{2}, pop. 168,000),
- Kościan county (area 1,057 km^{2}, pop. 78,900),
- Krotoszyn county (area 915 km^{2}, pop. 75,500),
- Leszno county (area 827 km^{2}, pop. 61,200),
- Międzychód county (area 755 km^{2}, pop. 31,000),
- Mogilno county (area 1,059 km^{2}, pop. 70,300),
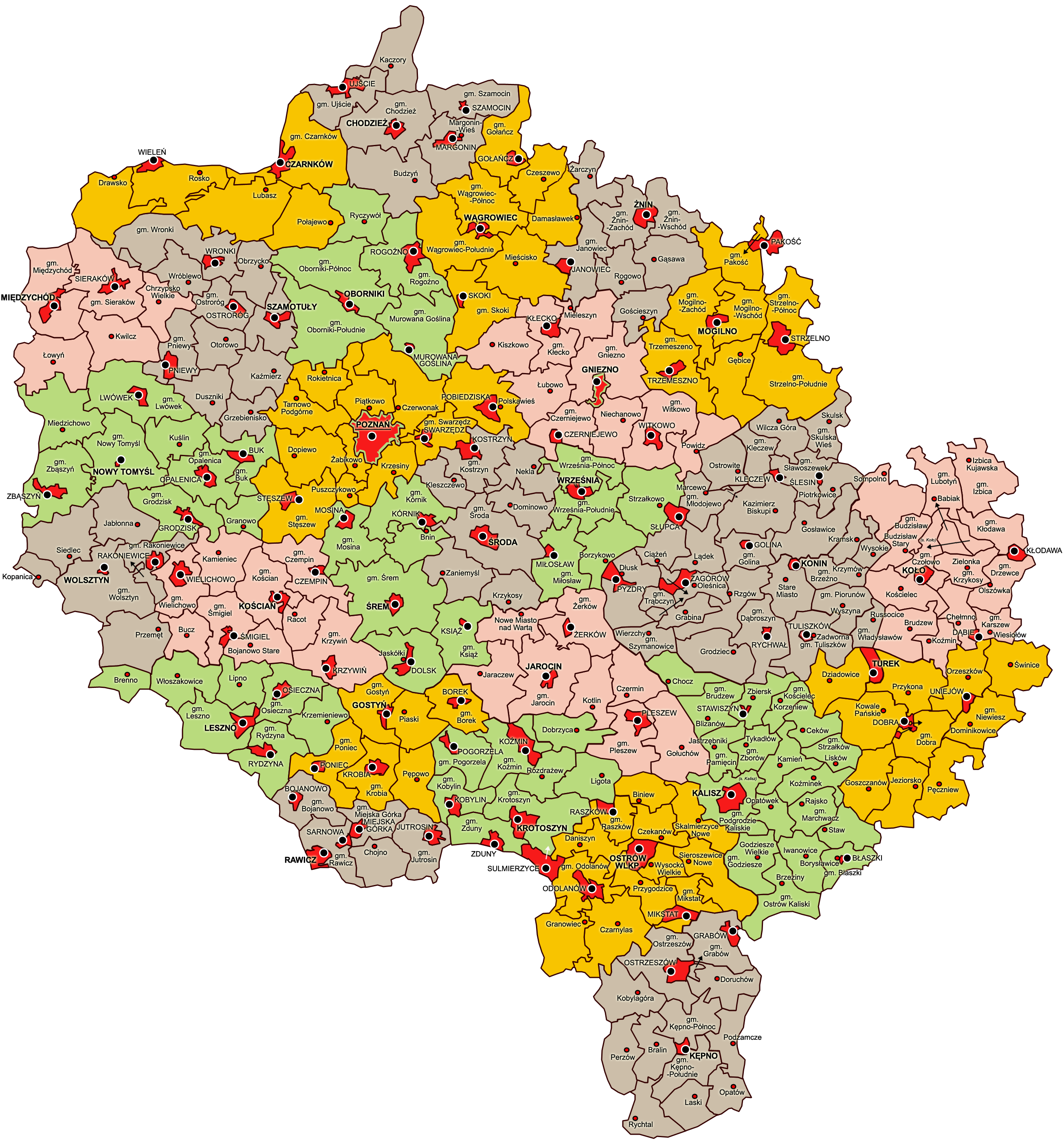
- Map of the administrative division in 1938.
  Nowy Tomyśl county (area 1,276 km^{2}, pop. 87,300),
- Oborniki county (area 966 km^{2}, pop. 50,400),
- Ostrów Wielkopolski county (area 1,194 km^{2}, pop. 104,100),
- city of Poznań county (area 77 km^{2}, pop. 246,500),
- Poznań county (area 1,227 km^{2}, pop. 91,200),
- Rawicz county (area 523 km^{2}, pop. 49,900),
- Szamotuły county (area 1,076 km^{2}, pop. 67,700),
- Środa Wielkopolska county (area 800 km^{2}, pop. 49,900),
- Śrem county (area 921 km^{2}, pop. 57,300),
- Turek county (area 1,591 km^{2}, pop. 130,500),
- Wągrowiec county (area 1,037 km^{2}, pop. 54,300),
- Wolsztyn county (area 754 km^{2}, pop. 47,900),
- Września county (area 608 km^{2}, pop. 43,700),
- Żnin county (area 739 km^{2}, pop. 41,500).

== Main cities ==
The biggest cities of the Voivodeship were (data according to the 1931 census):

- Poznań (pop. 246,500),
- Kalisz (pop. 68,300),
- Gniezno (pop. 30,700),
- Ostrów Wielkopolski (pop. 24,400),
- Leszno (pop. 19,400),
- Koło (pop. 13,800)
- Krotoszyn (pop. 13,000),
- Konin (pop. 10,300).

== Ethnic and religious structure ==
According to the 1921 census the voivodeship was inhabited by 1,967,865 people, of whom by nationality 1,636,316 were Poles (83.2%), 327,846 were Germans (16.7%), 1,485 were Jews (0.1%) and 2,218 were all others (0.1%). By religion, according to the 1921 census, 1,632,087 were Roman Catholics (83%), 322,872 were Protestants of all kinds (16.4%), 10,397 were Jews (0.5%) and 2,509 were all others (0.1%).

The detailed results of the 1931 census by county are presented below:

Linguistic (mother tongue) and religious structure of Poznań Voivodeship according to the 1931 census
County	Pop.	Polish	%	Yiddish & Hebrew	%	German	%	Other language %	Roman Catholic	%	Jewish	%	Protestant	%	Other religion %
Poznań City	246470	238167	96.6%	1067	0.4%	6387	2.6%	0.3%	236829	96.1%	1954	0.8%	6516	2.6%	0.5%
Bydgoszcz City	117200	104647	89.3%	912	0.8%	11276	9.6%	0.3%	103594	88.4%	1692	1.4%	10648	9.1%	1.1%
Bydgoszcz County	58139	50247	86.4%	144	0.2%	7517	12.9%	0.4%	44831	77.1%	148	0.3%	12700	21.8%	0.8%
Chodzież	44508	31930	71.7%	47	0.1%	12493	28.1%	0.1%	30831	69.3%	150	0.3%	13384	30.1%	0.3%
Czarnków	43256	36764	85.0%	138	0.3%	6273	14.5%	0.2%	36997	85.5%	259	0.6%	5894	13.6%	0.2%
Gniezno City	30675	29873	97.4%	102	0.3%	675	2.2%	0.1%	29802	97.2%	137	0.4%	678	2.2%	0.2%
Gniezno County	57256	50391	88.0%	24	0.0%	6790	11.9%	0.1%	49215	86.0%	174	0.3%	7595	13.3%	0.5%
Gostyń	55929	53461	95.6%	0	0.0%	2456	4.4%	0.0%	53270	95.2%	28	0.1%	2543	4.5%	0.2%
Inowrocław City	34364	33498	97.5%	51	0.1%	753	2.2%	0.2%	33356	97.1%	139	0.4%	750	2.2%	0.3%
Inowrocław County	48599	40956	84.3%	5	0.0%	7584	15.6%	0.1%	40796	83.9%	25	0.1%	7605	15.6%	0.4%
Jarocin	87546	83692	95.6%	52	0.1%	3744	4.3%	0.1%	84355	96.4%	113	0.1%	2912	3.3%	0.2%
Kępno	86849	82685	95.2%	102	0.1%	3273	3.8%	0.9%	77658	89.4%	296	0.3%	8393	9.7%	0.6%
Kościan	78899	76019	96.3%	1	0.0%	2832	3.6%	0.1%	75984	96.3%	24	0.0%	2675	3.4%	0.3%
Krotoszyn	75456	69733	92.4%	44	0.1%	5625	7.5%	0.1%	69264	91.8%	152	0.2%	5833	7.7%	0.3%
Leszno	61211	51240	83.7%	115	0.2%	9814	16.0%	0.1%	55120	90.0%	222	0.4%	5729	9.4%	0.2%
Międzychód	31032	28013	90.3%	7	0.0%	2992	9.6%	0.1%	27107	87.4%	11	0.0%	3844	12.4%	0.2%
Mogilno	89186	81347	91.2%	35	0.0%	7719	8.7%	0.1%	80814	90.6%	158	0.2%	7965	8.9%	0.3%
Nowy Tomyśl	87331	70946	81.2%	25	0.0%	16289	18.7%	0.1%	71915	82.3%	150	0.2%	14888	17.0%	0.4%
Oborniki	50388	42296	83.9%	48	0.1%	7960	15.8%	0.2%	42216	83.8%	193	0.4%	7785	15.5%	0.4%
Ostrów Wlkp.	104126	100017	96.1%	6	0.0%	3985	3.8%	0.1%	93636	89.9%	106	0.1%	10082	9.7%	0.3%
Poznań County	91182	86466	94.8%	8	0.0%	4596	5.0%	0.1%	86134	94.5%	32	0.0%	4654	5.1%	0.4%
Rawicz	49882	44834	89.9%	61	0.1%	4812	9.6%	0.4%	44254	88.7%	94	0.2%	5258	10.5%	0.6%
Szamotuły	67742	62933	92.9%	82	0.1%	4709	7.0%	0.0%	62640	92.5%	250	0.4%	4578	6.8%	0.4%
Szubin	47825	38091	79.6%	35	0.1%	9638	20.2%	0.1%	37770	79.0%	119	0.2%	9776	20.4%	0.3%
Śrem	57304	54269	94.7%	20	0.0%	2996	5.2%	0.0%	54107	94.4%	82	0.1%	3000	5.2%	0.2%
Środa Wlkp.	49902	47833	95.9%	17	0.0%	2016	4.0%	0.1%	47667	95.5%	75	0.2%	2029	4.1%	0.3%
Wągrowiec	54259	47159	86.9%	36	0.1%	7039	13.0%	0.0%	46574	85.8%	100	0.2%	7424	13.7%	0.3%
Wolsztyn	47892	37993	79.3%	12	0.0%	9857	20.6%	0.1%	38708	80.8%	48	0.1%	8968	18.7%	0.4%
Września	43698	41119	94.1%	42	0.1%	2506	5.7%	0.1%	41370	94.7%	77	0.2%	2188	5.0%	0.1%
Wyrzysk	66873	53057	79.3%	20	0.0%	13736	20.5%	0.1%	53414	79.9%	132	0.2%	13069	19.5%	0.4%
Żnin	41521	36719	88.4%	33	0.1%	4738	11.4%	0.1%	36573	88.1%	71	0.2%	4724	11.4%	0.4%
Total	2106500	1906395	90.5%	3291	0.2%	193080	9.2%	0.2%	1886801	89.6%	7211	0.3%	204087	9.7%	0.4%

== German minority ==
In 1926 and 1934 German minority in Poznań Voivodeship carried out their own censuses, counting themselves. Here are their results:

County (German name in brackets)	ethnic German population (1926)	ethnic German population (1934)
Odolanów (Adelnau)	10,038	9,442
Międzychód (Birnbaum)	4,655	4,377
Bydgoszcz (Bromberg, town)	11,016	10,021
Bydgoszcz (Bromberg, district)	13,281	12,211
Czarnków (Czarnikau)	5,511	4,773
Gniezno (Gnesen) / Witkowo	8,616	7,876
Gostyń (Gostyn)	2,395	2,162
Grodzisk Wielkopolski (Grätz) / Nowy Tomyśl (Neutomischel)	16,576	16,555
Inowrocław (Hohensalza)	8,455	8,096
Jarocin (Jarotschin) / Pleszew (Pleschen)	4,667	4,019
Kępno (Kempen) / Ostrzeszów (Schildberg)	16,631	10,889
Chodzież (Kolmar)	14,246	12,348
Koźmin (Koschmin) / Krotoszyn (Krotoschin)	6,542	5,807
Leszno (Lissa)	9,917	8,371
Mogilno (Mogilno) / Strzelno (Strelno)	8,727	7,770
Oborniki (Obornik)	9,417	8,410
Poznań (Posen, town)	5,980	4,387
Poznań (Posen, district)	4,687	4,252
Rawicz (Rawitsch)	6,184	5,038
Szamotuły (Samter)	5,029	4,841
Śmigiel (Schmiegel) / Kościan (Kosten)	3,636	3,488
Śrem (Schrimm)	2,802	3,574
Środa Wielkopolska (Schroda)	2,269	2,029
Szubin (Schubin)	10,193	8,879
Wyrzysk (Wirsitz)	13,495	12,410
Wolsztyn (Wollstein)	10,369	9,313
Wągrowiec (Wongrowitz)	8,401	7,143
Września (Wreschen)	2,436	2,115
Żnin (Znin)	5,404	4,539
Poznań Voivodship (total)	224,254	203,135

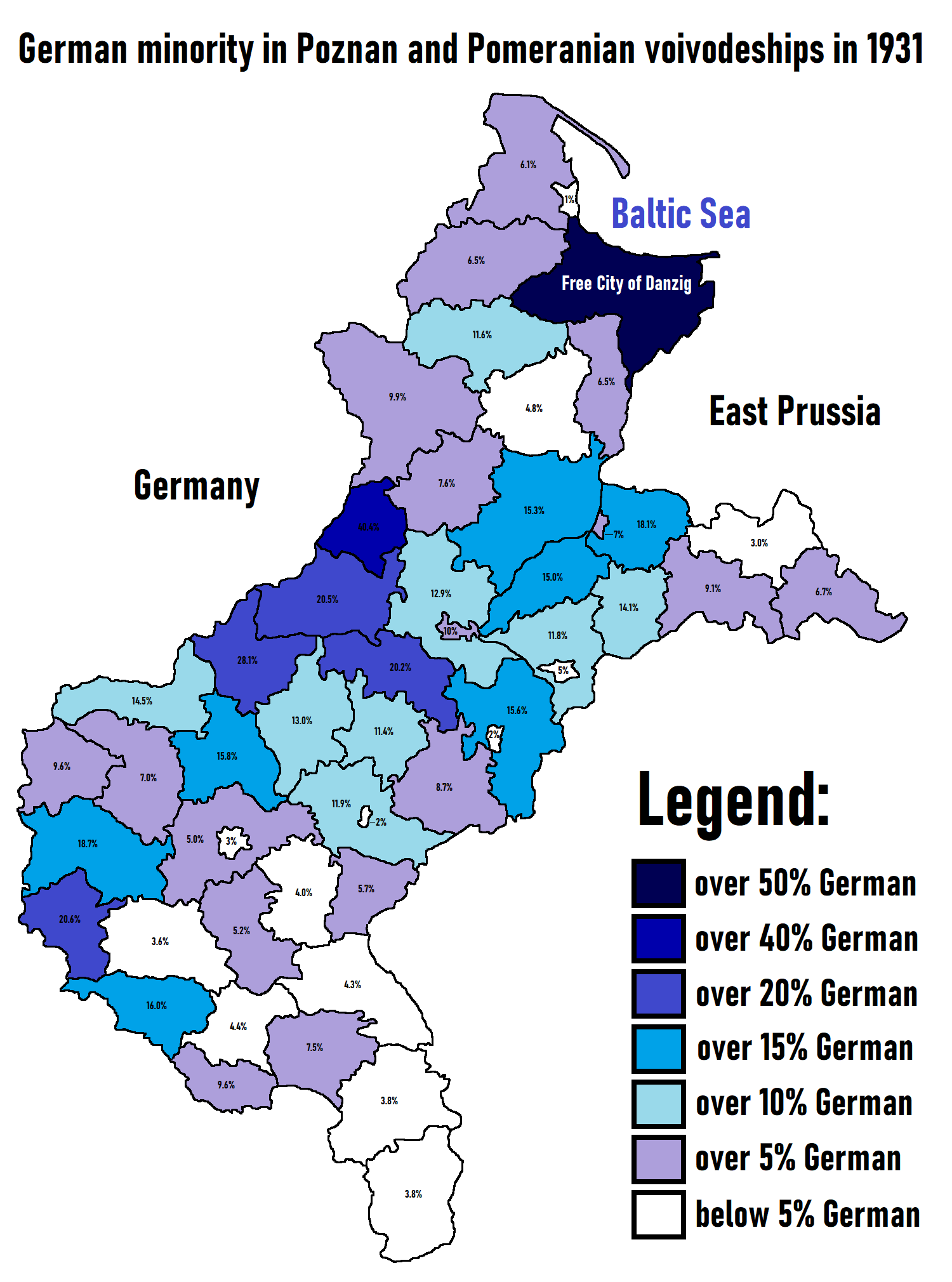
German minority in Poznań and Pomeranian voivodeships according to the 1931 Polish census

== Voivodes ==
- Wojciech Trąmpczyński 1 August 1919 – 23 October 1919
- Witold Celichowski 1 August 1919 – 2 January 1923
- Adolf Bniński 10 January 1923 – 9 May 1928
- Piotr Dunin-Borkowski 9 May 1928 – 11 October 1929
- Roger Adam Raczyński 11 October 1929 – 31 July 1934
- Stanisław Kaucki 1 August 1934 – 15 January 1935 (acting)
- Artur Maruszewski 16 June 1935 – 23 June 1935
- Mikołaj Kwaśniewski 26 June 1935 – 13 September 1935
- Tadeusz Walicki 19 September 1935 – 29 October 1935 (acting)
- Artur Maruszewski 29 October 1935 – 19 May 1939
- Ludwik Bociański 19 May 1939 – 12 September 1939
- Cyryl Ratajski 4 September 1939 – 12 September 1939 (acting)

== See also ==
- Poland's current Greater Poland and Kuyavian-Pomeranian Voivodeships
- Territorial changes of Polish Voivodeships on April 1, 1938
