= Juodšiliai Eldership =

Juodšiliai Eldership Juodšilių seniūnija
- Eldership
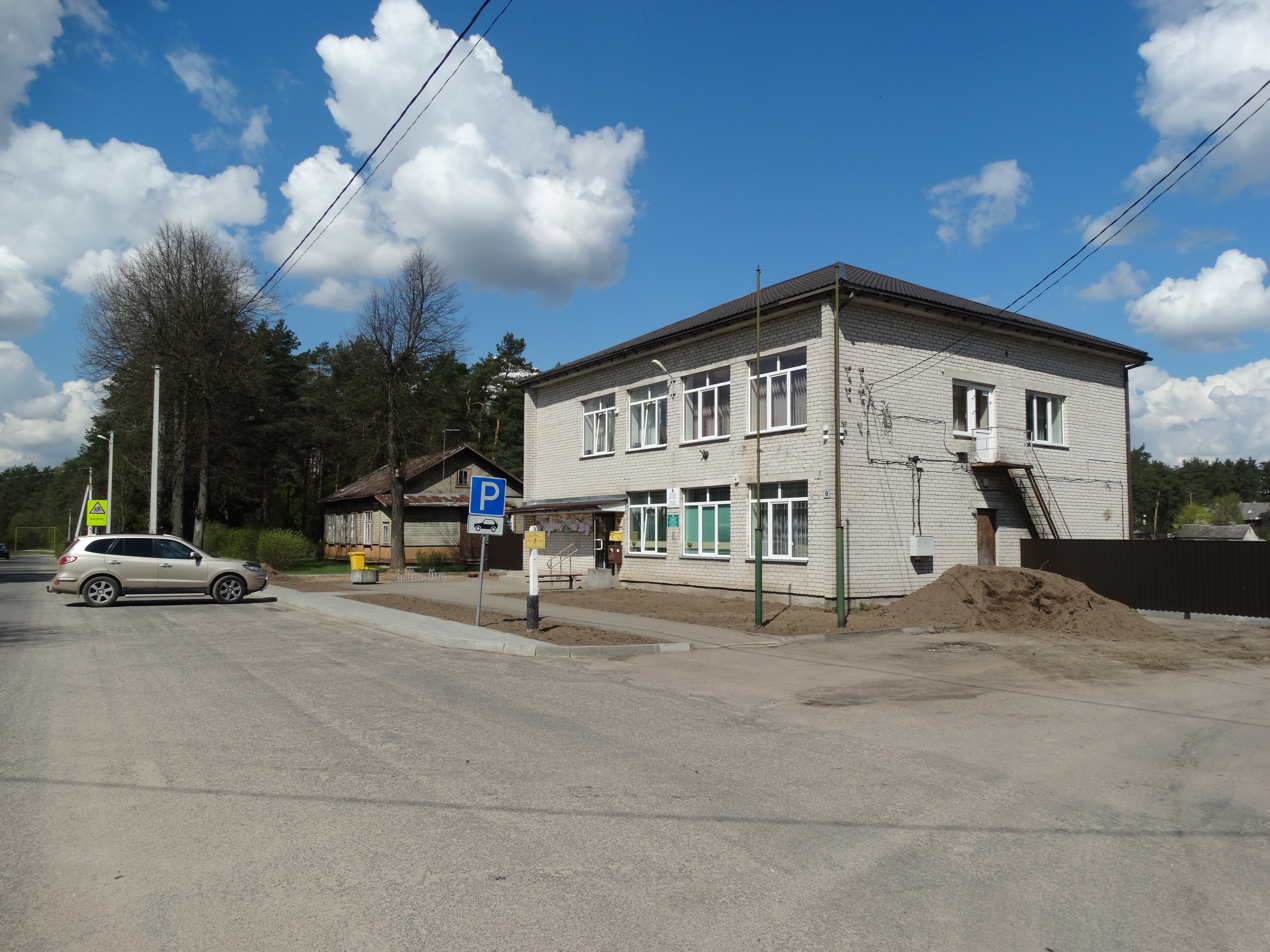
- Eldership administrative building in Juodšiliai

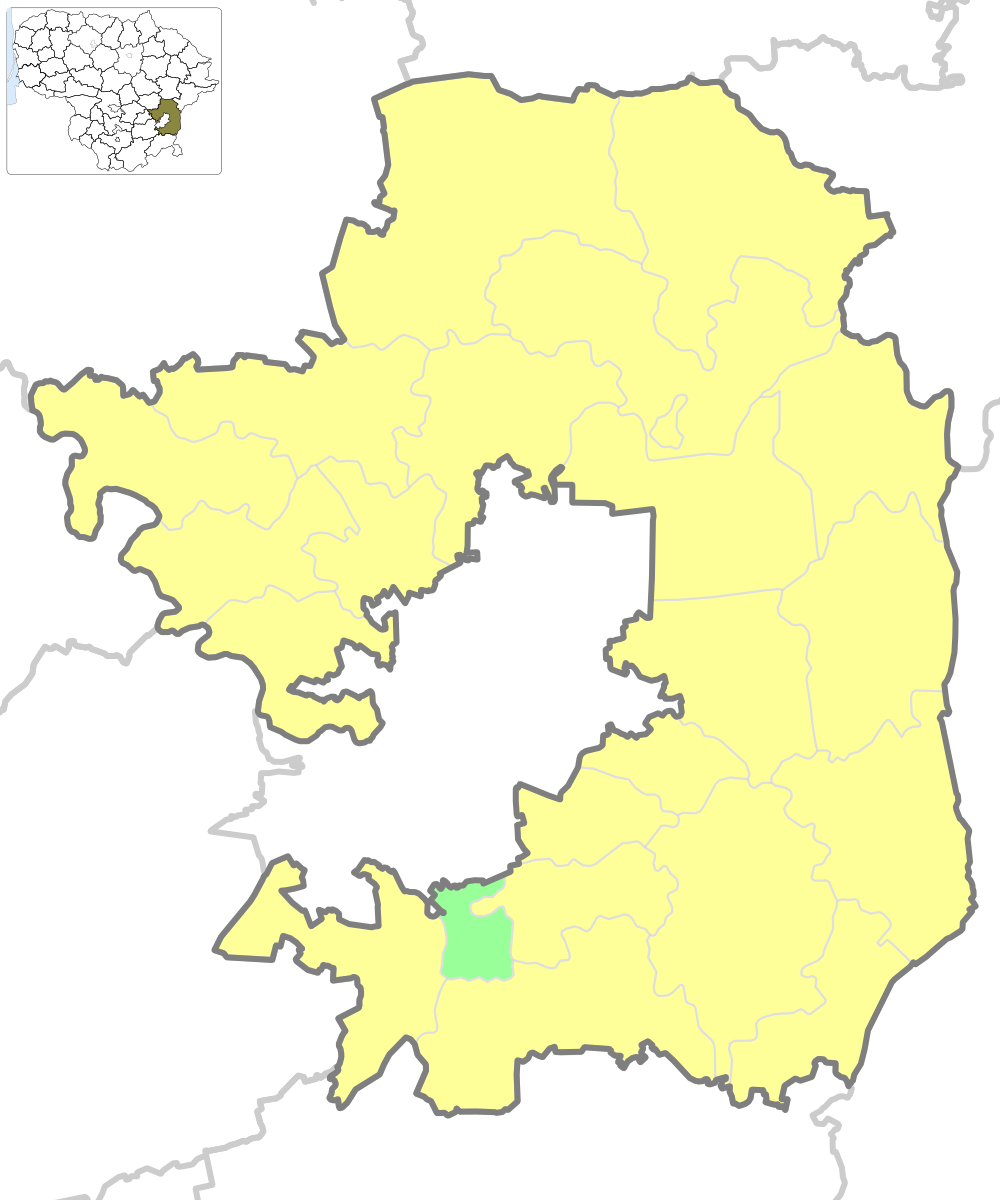
- Location of Juodšiliai Eldership
- Country: Lithuania
- Ethnographic region: Dzūkija
- County: Vilnius County
- Municipality: Vilnius District Municipality
- Administrative centre: Juodšiliai

Government
  - Elder: Tadeuš Aškalianec

Area
  - Total: 23.63 km^{2} (9.12 sq mi)

Population (2019)
  - Total: 4,671
  - Density: 197.7/km^{2} (512.0/sq mi)
- Time zone: UTC+2 (EET)
  - Summer (DST): UTC+3 (EEST)
- Website: https://www.vrsa.lt

Juodšiliai Eldership (Lithuanian: Juodšilių seniūnija) is an eldership in Lithuania, located in Vilnius District Municipality, south of Vilnius.

== Etymology ==
The name Juodšiliai means "the black groves" . The village was named sometime after 1920, and takes its name from the surrounding coniferous forests.

== Geography and nature ==
Rudaminėlė, a tributary of Vokė, flows along the northwest border of the eldership.

== History ==
The settlement appeared relatively recently. Until World War I, the area was a forest (named Juodasis Šilas), which was felled by German soldiers. A railway was laid to transport the timber, and a train station was built nearby.

The cleared space near the railway gave rise to a railroad worker village Reslerava.

The scenic area was favoured by the intelligentsia of Vilnius, and a campsite was built there.

In 1919, a school was opened in the village, and a monastery worked between 1920 and 1939. An orphanage also worked from 1924 to 1946.

The construction of a church was started in 1936, but was halted due to the war. After it, the church building was used to establish a foster home, later a hospital, but a fire in 1991 damaged the building. In 2001, the church was returned to its original purpose, and the church was officially inaugurated in 2016.

== Populated places ==
9 villages are located in the eldership, the largest of which are Juodšiliai and Valčiūnai.

== Notable locations ==
- Juodšiliai Church of the Blessed Mykolas Sopočka
- Juodšiliai tumulus
- Dusinėnai tumuli
- Prūdiškės Manor ruins
- Writer Józef Mackiewicz farmhouse in Juodšiliai
- Kelmytė ancient charcoal-burning place

== Ethnic composition ==
According to the 2011 census:

- Polish - 46.1%
- Lithuanian - 27.9%
- Russian - 13.7%
- Belarusian - 6.8%

== Notable people ==
- Uršulė Leduchovska (1865–1939), nun, actively helped the impoverished and young women. Recognized as a saint in 2003.
- Mykolas Sopočka (1880–1975), catholic priest, professor of theology, who sheltered in the village from Soviet deportations.
- Józef Mackiewicz (1902–1985), Polish writer, publicist and politician. Lived in Juodšiliai during the Soviet occupation.

== Gallery ==
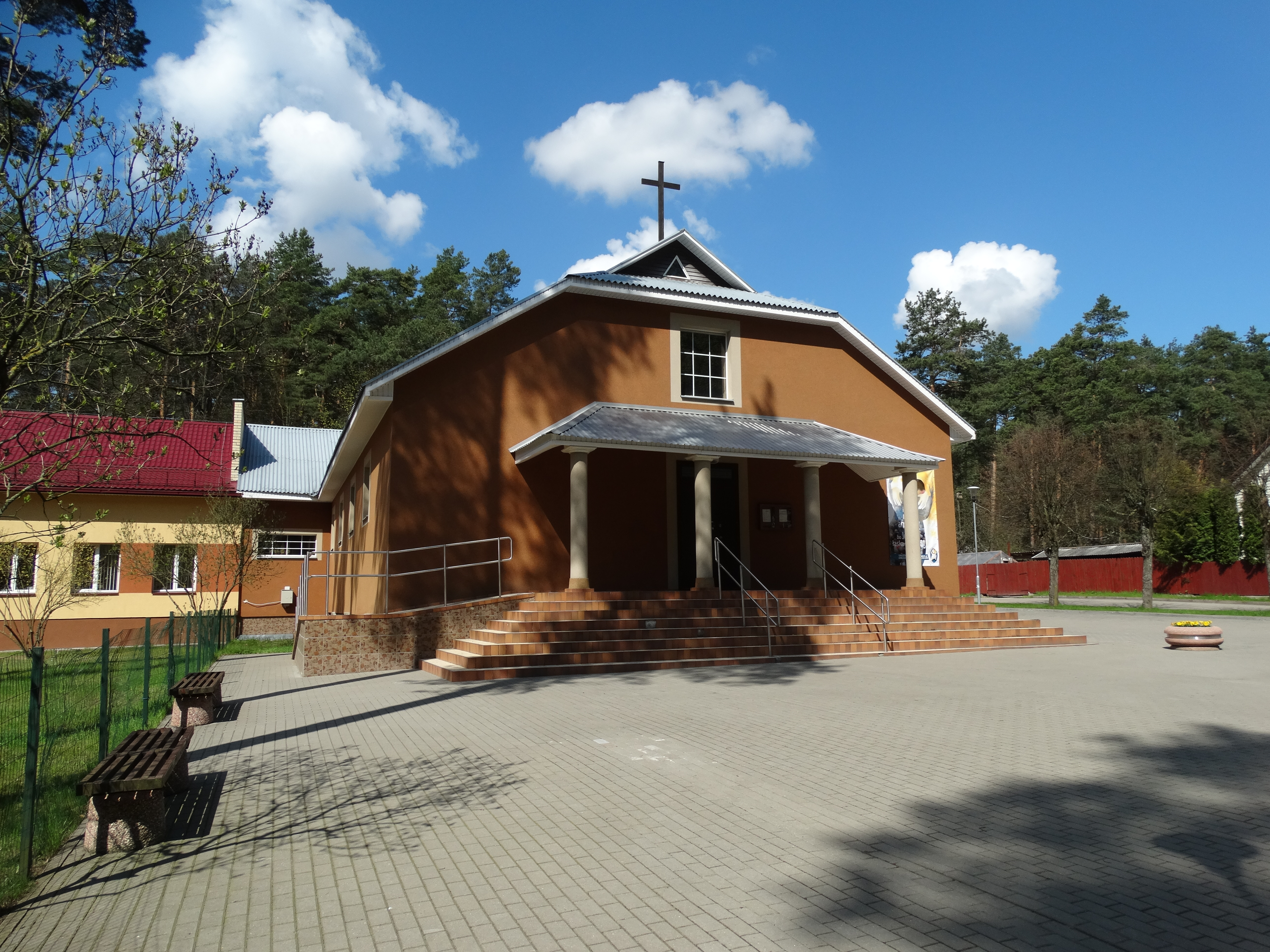
Church of Juodšiliai

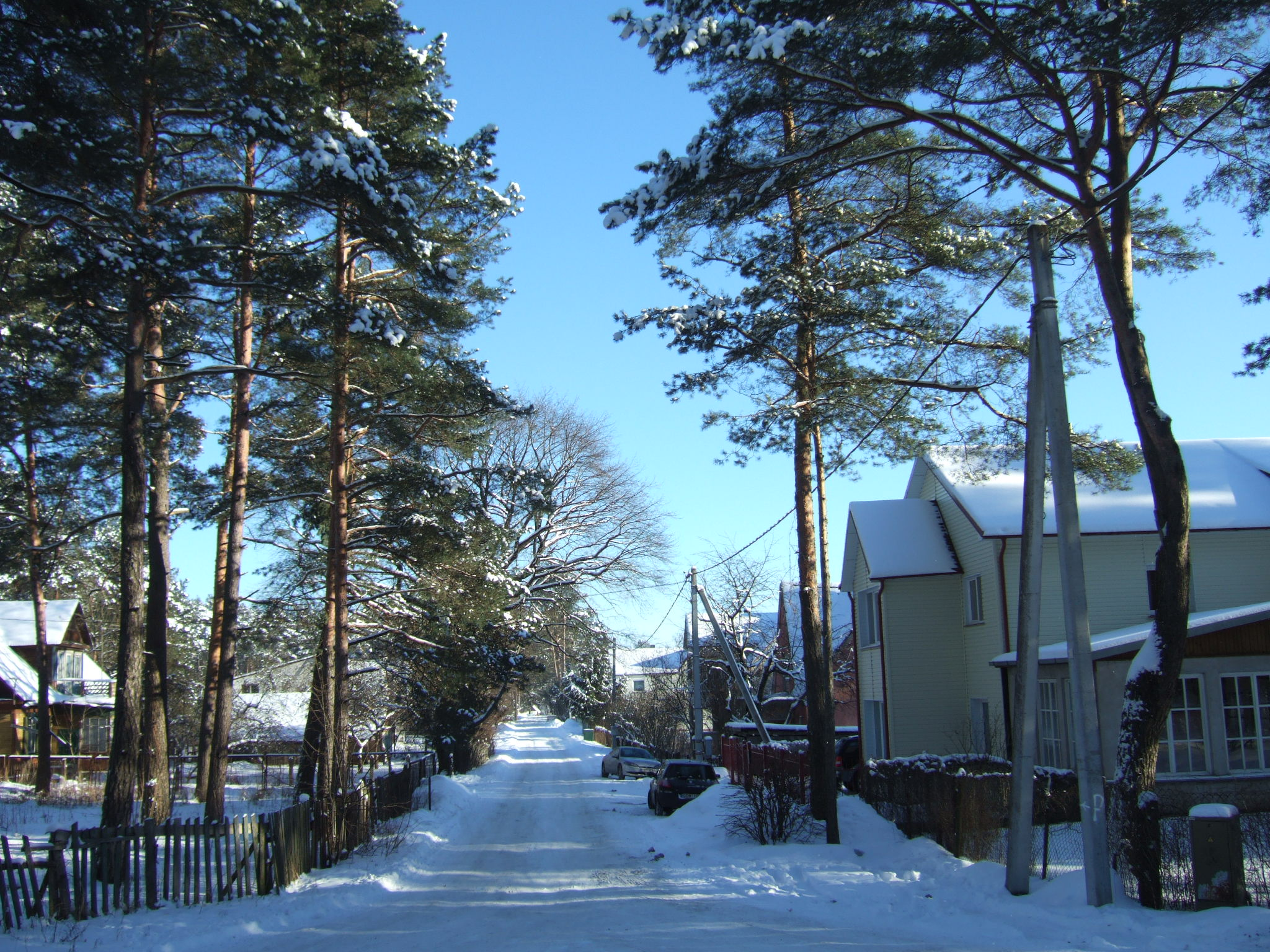
Juodšiliai in 2013

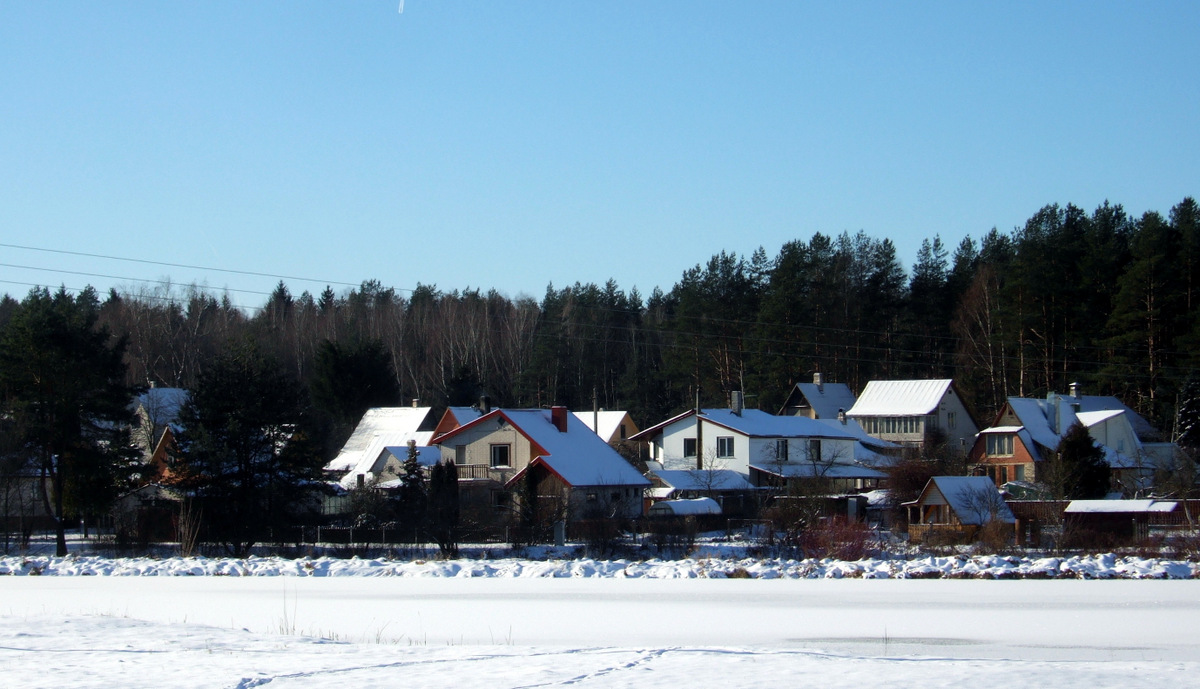
Prūdiškės in 2014

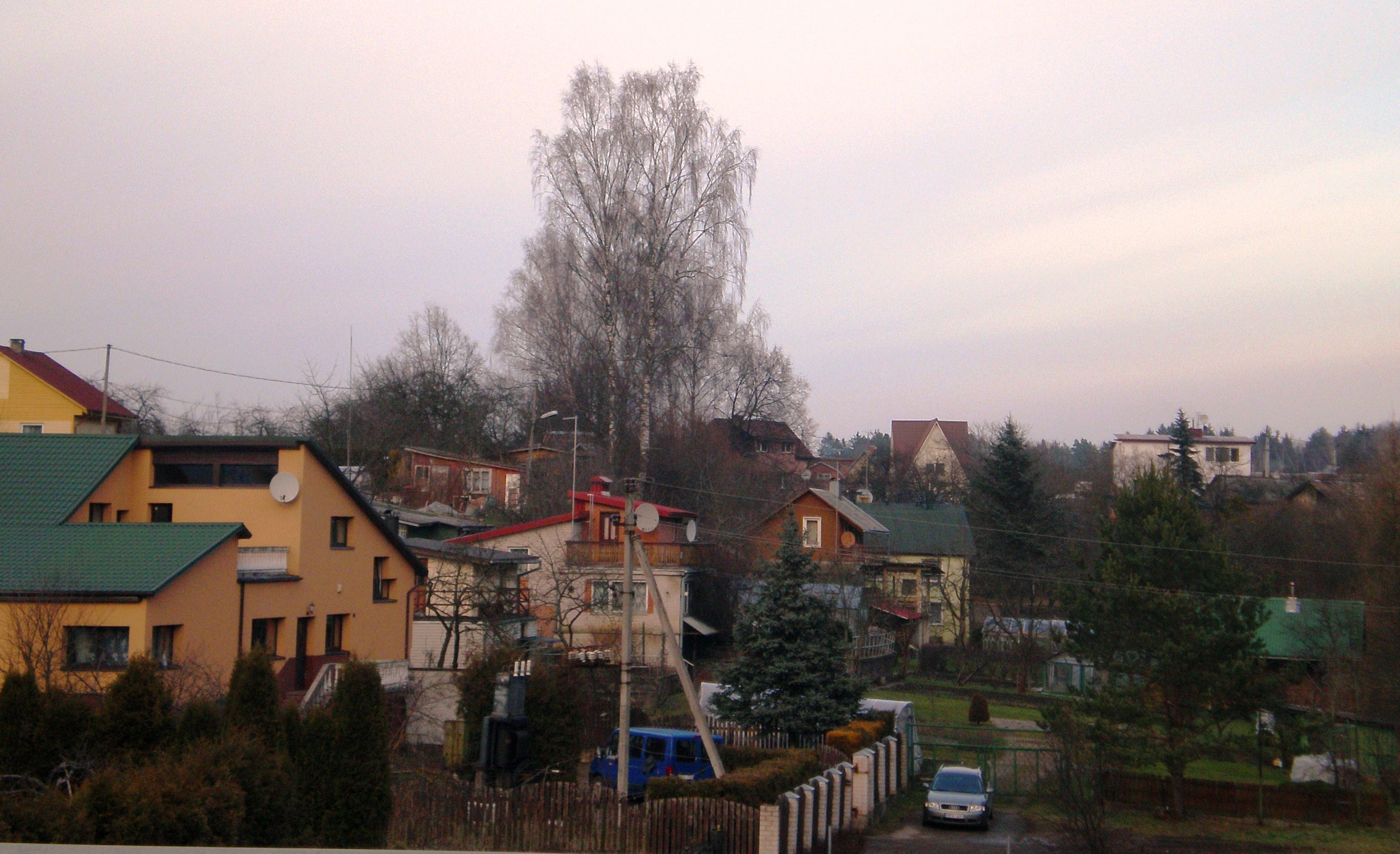
Miškiniai

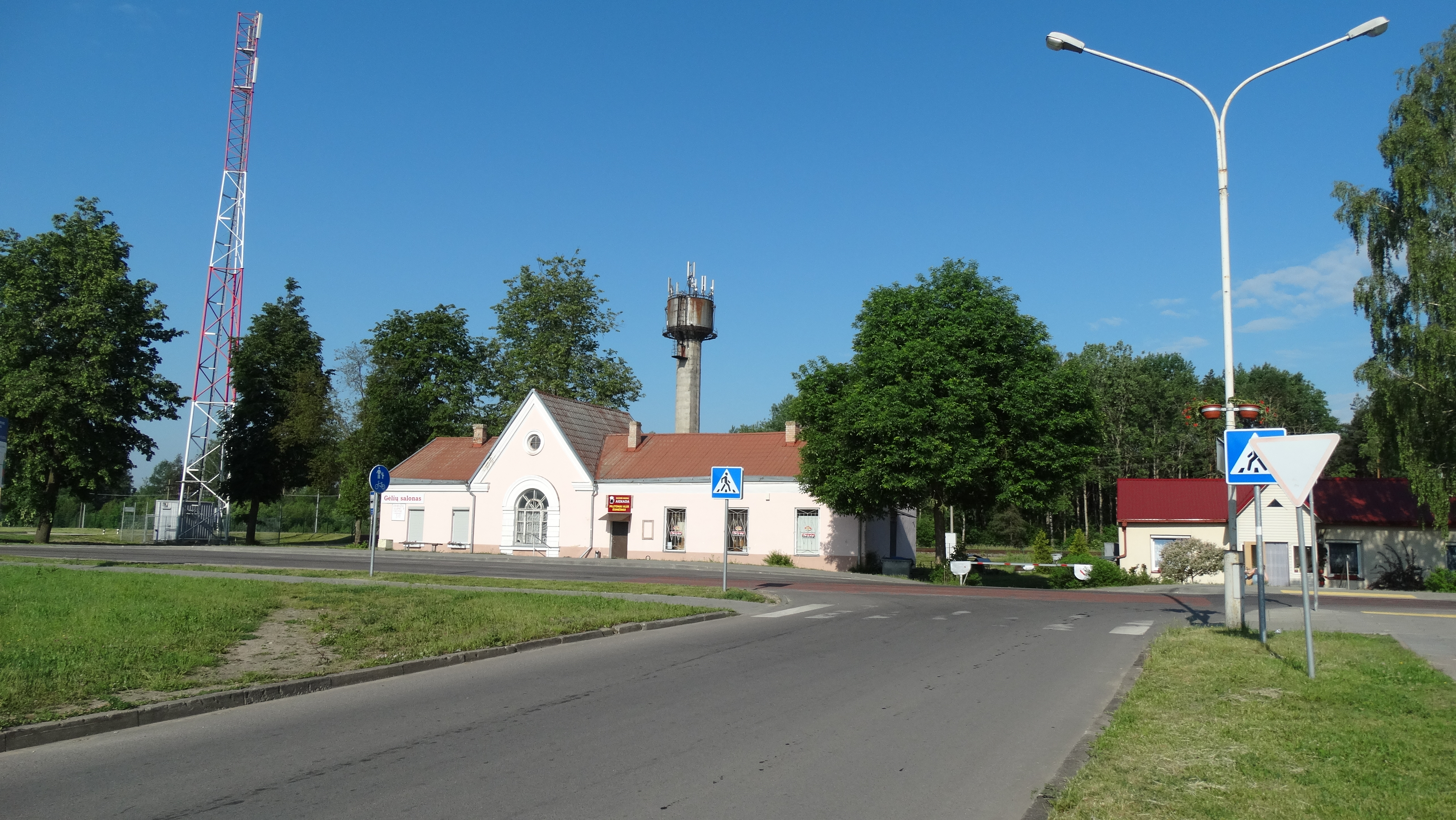
Former railway station at Valčiūnai
