= Sigismund Augustus Gymnasium in Vilnius =

Polish interwar high school for boys in Vilnius

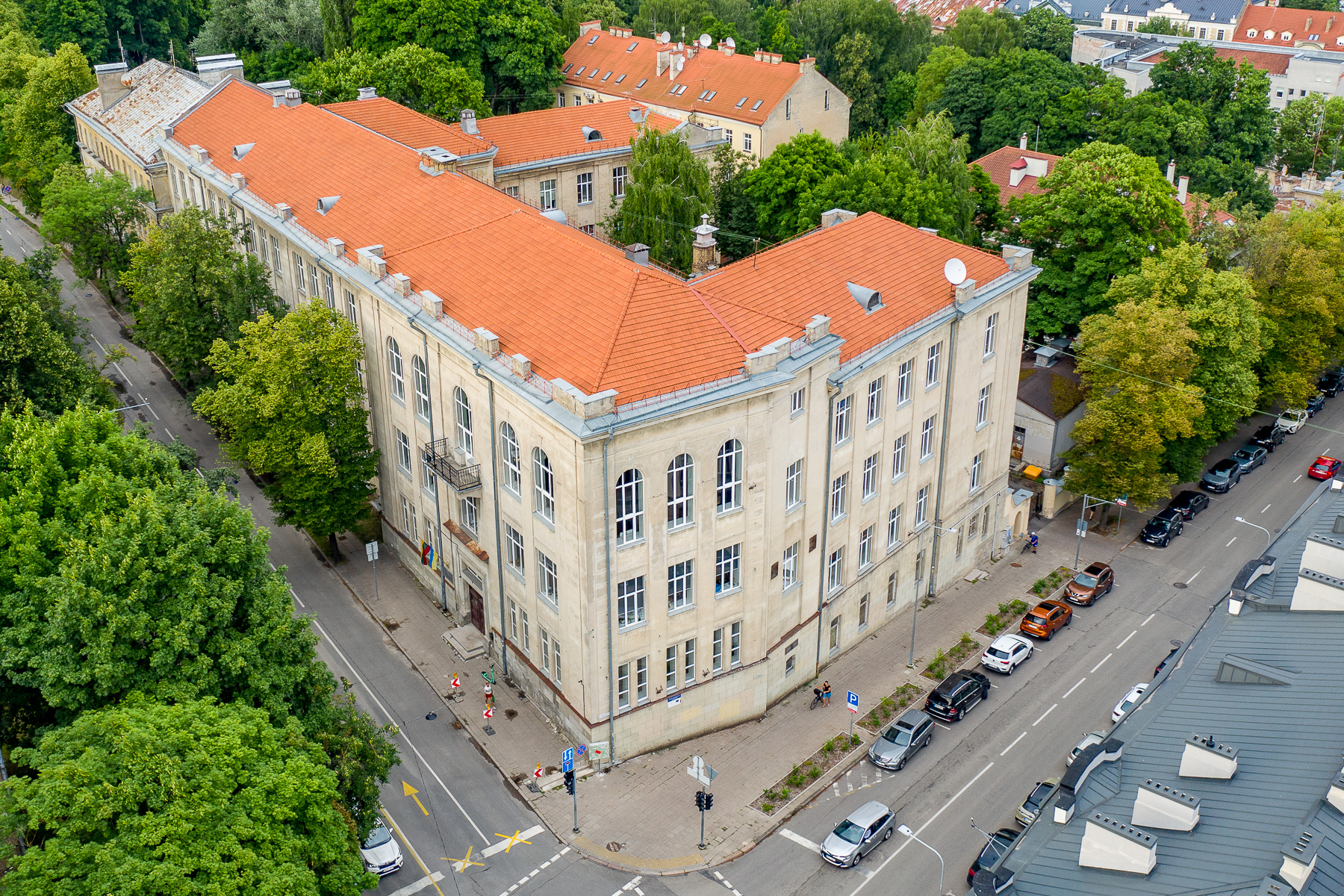
Building of King Sigismund Augustus Gymnasium in Vilnius, now headquarter of Lithuanian National Education Agency.

King Sigismund Augustus Gymnasium in Vilnius was a Polish high school (gymnasium) for boys that existed in Vilnius from 1915 to 1939.

== History ==
=== Establishment ===
The gymnasium was established in late August 1915 as a school of the Polish Teachers Association – at the same time a female school, later the Eliza Orzeszkowa Gymnasium in Vilnius, began operating. The initiator of the establishment of these institutions was Stanisław Kościałkowski, who supervised their operation for the next few years. The association operated in Vilnius as a self-help association of female teachers, and secretly organized education for Polish youth since 1896. From the retreating Russian authorities, the association obtained permission to organize gymnasium courses.

The first director of the school, then located at 10 Wileńska Street, was Stanisław Zieliński. Its initial name was the 1st Male Gymnasium of the Association Polish Teachers and Educators.

=== Operations ===
For the first three years (1915–1917) the school faced many problems, caused both by the activities of the German occupation authorities and the lack of financial resources. The situation was even worse during the occupation of the city by the Bolsheviks, but education was not interrupted. The situation improved after the capture of Vilnius by the Polish army in April 1919 – the school received material support from the state authorities, and moved to a spacious building at 11 Mała Pohulanka Street. Zygmunt Fedorowicz took over the management of the school.

In 1920 the gymnasium became public institution and took the name of King Sigismund II Augustus. Since 1932, as a result of the Jędrzejewicz reform, the school became the King Sigismund Augustus Gymnasium and High School. It ceased to exist, like other Polish secondary schools in Vilnius, in December 1939 when Vilnius was part of Lithuania. It was transformed into the Vilnius State Municipal Gymnasium.

== Directors ==
Until 1924, the head of the gymnasium was Zygmunt Fedorowicz, and from 1924 the director of the gymnasium was Jan Zelski.

== Alumni ==
Graduates of the Sigismund Augustus Gymnasium included:

- Antoni Gołubiew
- Tadeusz Konwicki
- Czesław Miłosz
- Andrew Schally
- Stanisław Stomma

== Bibliography ==
- Falkowska, Joanna; Walasek, Stefania (2019). "Szkoły Stowarzyszenia Nauczycielstwa Polskiego w Wilnie (1896–1921)" [Schools of the Polish Teachers Association in Vilnius (1896–1921)]. Biuletyn Historii Wychowania. 41.
- Zawistowski, Tomasz (2016). "Orzeł Gimnazjum im. Króla Zygmunta Augusta w Wilnie". Pamięć.pl. 4.
