= Juodšiliai =

- Village
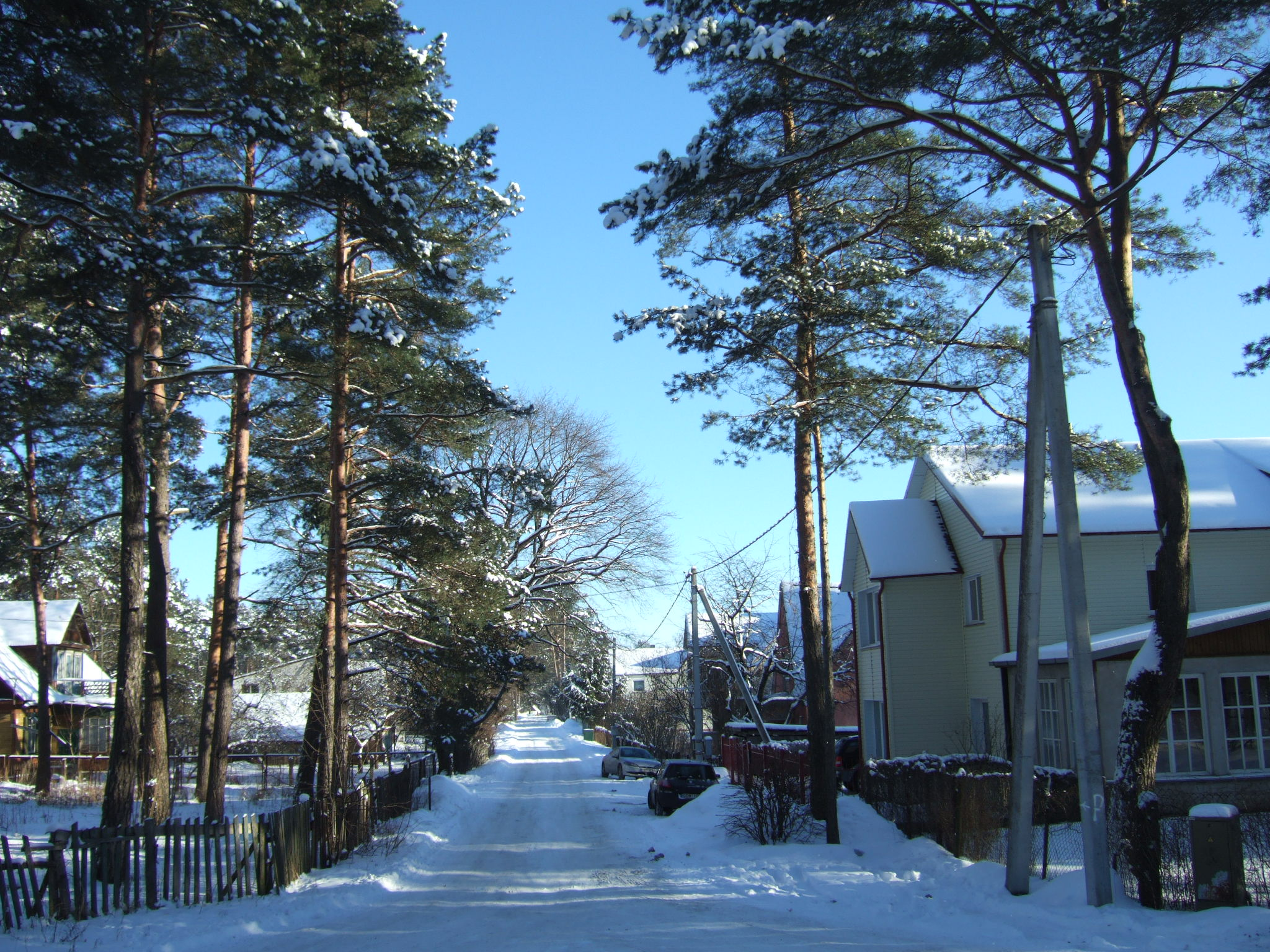

- Location of Juodšiliai
- Coordinates: 54°34′52″N 25°16′01″E
- Country: Lithuania
- County: Vilnius County
- Municipality: Vilnius district municipality
- Eldership: Juodšiliai eldership

Population (2021)
  - Total: 1,517
- Time zone: UTC+2 (EET)
  - Summer (DST): UTC+3 (EEST)

Juodšiliai is a village Vilnius District Municipality, it is located only about 1 kilometre (0.62 mi) south-east of Vilnius city municipality. It is the seat of Juodšiliai eldership and is further subdivided into 4 seniūnaitijos (subelderships).

The village is home to Church of Blessed Mykolas Sopočka (built in 2016), post office, dispensary, two high schools and a library.

== History ==
Juodšiliai houses a tumulus. During World War I, a forest was cut down in the area of the current village and a railway was built. Until 1920, the railway station was called Reslerava. During Polish rule, Juodšiliai housed a monastery with an orphanage and primary school. During Soviet occupation, it was a local administrative center.

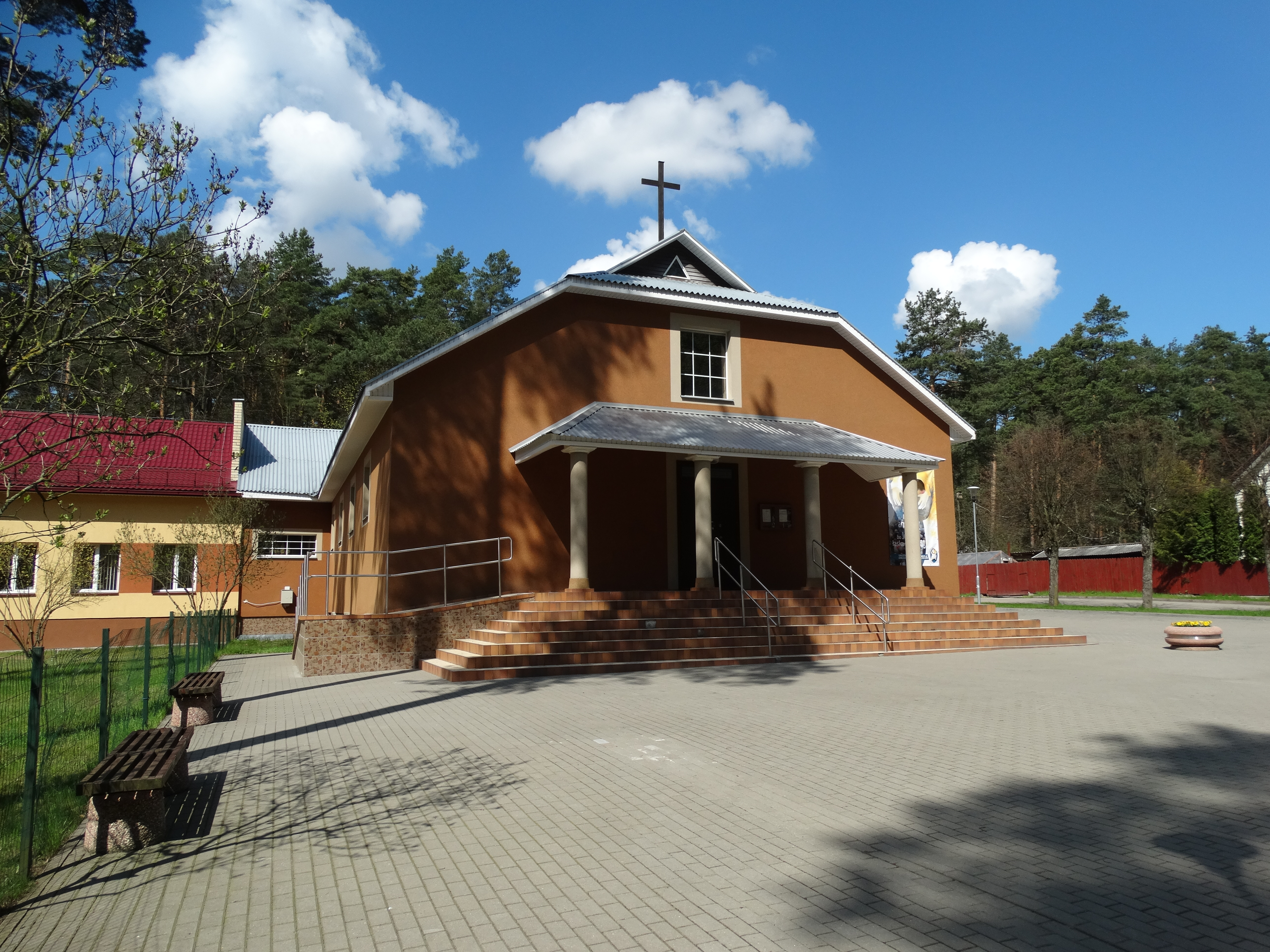
Juodšiliai Church of Blessed Mykolas Sopočka
