= Wilno Land =

District of the Second Polish Republic (1922–1926)

- District of Poland
- 1922–1926
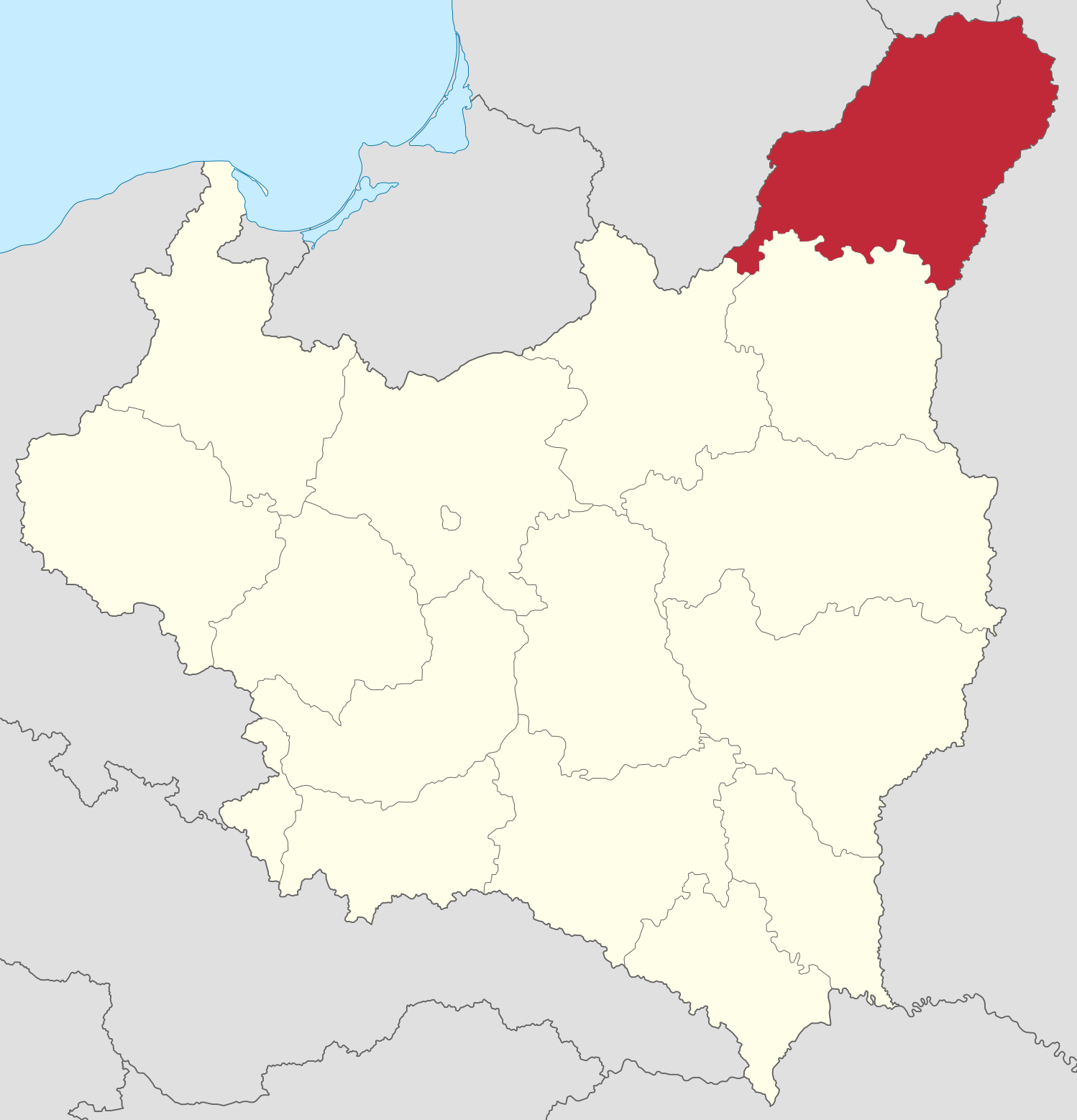
- Location within Poland
- Capital: Wilno (Vilnius)
- Area
  - 1925: 27,849 km^{2} (10,753 sq mi)
- Population
  - 1925: 973,404
- History
  - Incorporation of Republic of Central Lithuania: 13 April 1922
  - Transformation into Wilno Voivodeship: 20 January 1926
- Contained within
  - Country: Poland
Preceded by	Succeeded by
Central Lithuania; Nowogródek Voivodeship	Wilno Voivodeship

Wilno Land (Note: Polish: Ziemia Wileńska; Lithuanian: Vilniaus žemė; Belarusian: Віленская зямля, transcripion: Vilienskaja ziamlia) was a district of Poland, with capital in Vilnius, that existed from 13 April 1922 until 20 January 1926. The territory was formed in 1922 from territories of the Republic of Central Lithuania incorporated into Poland, and 3 counties from Nowogródek Voivodeship. In 1926, the territory was transformed into the Wilno Voivodeship, becoming the last voivodeship of the Second Polish Republic to be formed. It had an area of 27,849 km^{2} (10,753 sq mi) and in 1925, it was inhabited by 973,404 people.

== History ==
Territories of Republic of Central Lithuania incorporated into Wilno Land. Territories of Nowogródek Voivodeship incorporated into Wilno Land.

Wilno Land was formed on 13 April 1922, from territories of Republic of Central Lithuania, following its incorporation by Second Polish Republic. The annexation itself was decided in the bill signed on 6 April 1922. The annexed lands included the city of Vilnius as well as the territories of Brasław, Oszmiana, Święciany, Troki and Wilno Counties. Additionally to territory were added Duniłowicze, Dzisna and Wilejka Counties from neighbouring Nowogródek Voivodeship. Between 1923 and 1924, Wilno and Troki Counties were combined into Wilno-Troki County, tough de facto they acted as singular county since 1921. On 1 January 1926, Duniłowicze County was transformed into Postawy County.

On 20 January 1926, following the bill from 22 December 1925, Wilno Land was transformed into the Wilno Voivodeship, becoming the last voivodeship of the Second Polish Republic to be formed.

== Administrative division ==
Wilno Land was divided into 8 counties that were divided into the 118 municipalities, 13 of which were cities.

=== Counties ===
- Vilnius (city county)
- Brasław County
- Duniłowicze County (1922–1925)
- Dzisna County
- Oszmiana County
- Postawy County (1926)
- Święciany County
- Troki County (de jure 1922–1922/23, de facto 1921)
- Wilejka County
- Wilno County (de jure 1921–1923/24, de facto 1921)
- Wilno-Troki County (de jure 1923/24–1926, de facto 1921–1926)

== Bibliography ==
- Zeszyt VII. Spis ludności na terenach administrowanych przez Zarząd Cywilny Ziem Wschodnich (grudzień 1919). Lviv/Warsaw. Książnica Polska T-wa Naucz. Szkół Wyższych. 1920, p. 50, series: Prace geograficzne wydawane by Eugenjusz Romer.
- Zarząd Cywilny Ziem Wschodnich (19 lutego 1919 – 9 września 1920) by Joanna Gierowska-Kałłaur, 1st edition. Warsaw. Wydawnictwo Neriton. Instytut Historii PAN. 2003. p. 447. ISBN 83-88973-60-6.
