= Vilnius Region under Lithuanian administration (1939–1940) =

As a result of the German-Soviet Invasion of Poland, part of the Vilnius Region was under Lithuanian administration in the period lasting from the takeover of the city from the occupying Soviet administration on 27 October 1939, to the occupation of all of Lithuania, including Vilnius, on 15 June 1940.

As a result of the Polish–Lithuanian War (1919–1920) and the Polish–Soviet War (1919–1921), Vilnius and the surrounding region became part of Poland for a period of 19 years. Lithuania continued to claim the territory, regarding Vilnius as its historical and constitutional capital, as it had been the capital since 1323. The strained relations between the two countries did not improve until 1938. In the following year, however, Poland became the victim of a joint German-Soviet invasion in September 1939; as a result of the defeat, its territory was divided between the two occupiers. Lithuania did not join the invasion, but the Soviets offered to cede Vilnius and the Vilnius region in return for allowing the establishment of Soviet military bases on its territory.

The transfer of Vilnius, completed on 27 October 1939, was celebrated as an act of historical justice, even though it resulted in a de facto loss of sovereignty. It also led to the severance of diplomatic relations with the Polish government-in-exile, which regarded Lithuanian rule as an occupation. Lithuania opted against an immediate relocation of its capital to Vilnius, instead embarking on a policy of Lithuanization, which hurt the Polish population, who made up the majority of the population of the incorporated territory, particularly the closure of all Polish organizations and the withdrawal of civil rights from a population that Lithuania considered foreign. Despite these measures, the Polish population regarded Lithuanian rule as more favorable than German or Soviet occupation.

In June 1940, as part of its occupation of the Baltic States, the Soviets demanded in an ultimatum that Lithuania form a puppet government, the People's Government of Lithuania, and allow Soviet troops into the entire territory of the state. This marked the complete loss of sovereignty and the de facto occupation of the whole of Lithuania by the Soviet Union.

== Entry of Lithuanian troops into the Vilnius region ==
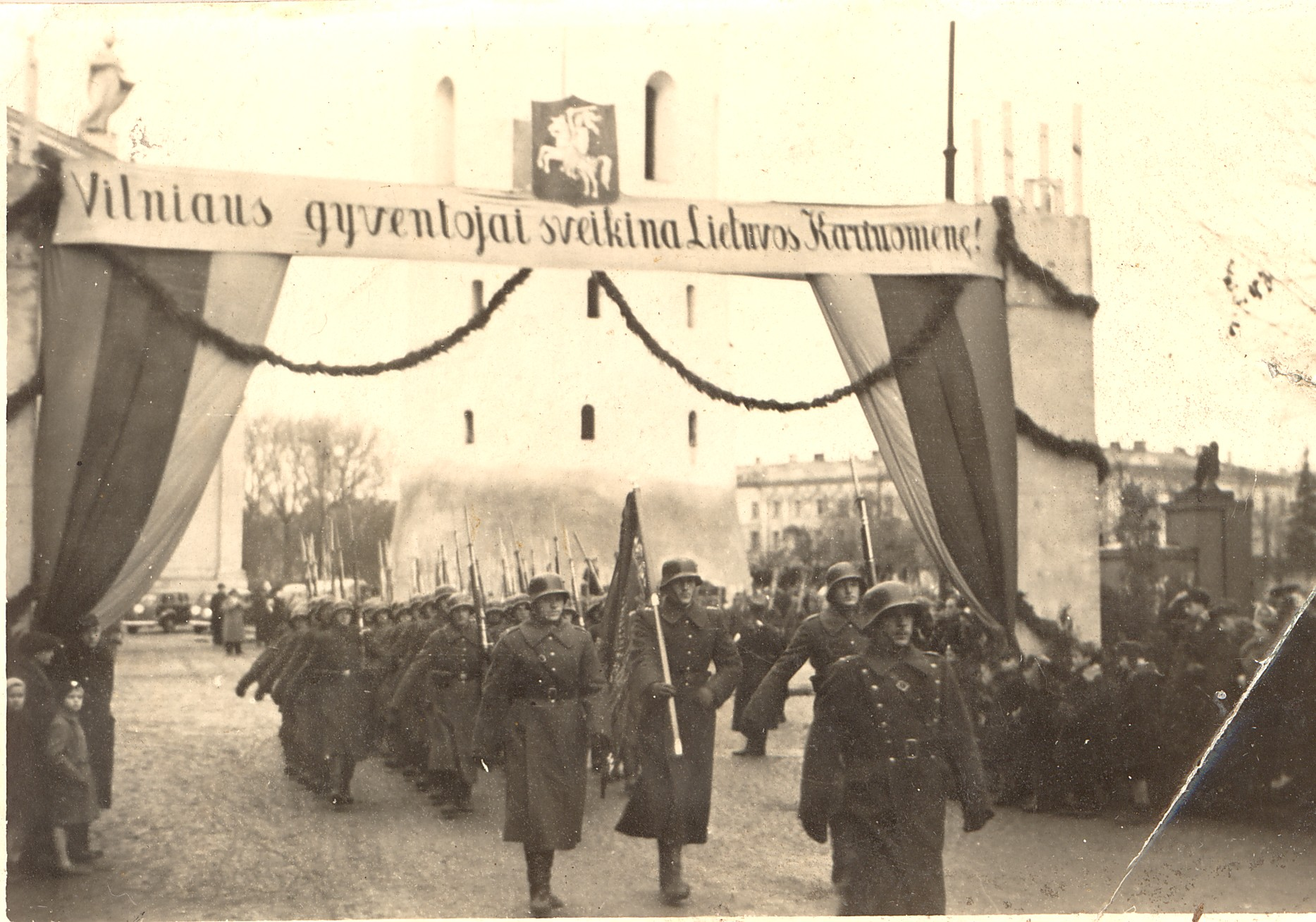
The Lithuanian Army's parade upon its entry into Vilnius in October 1939

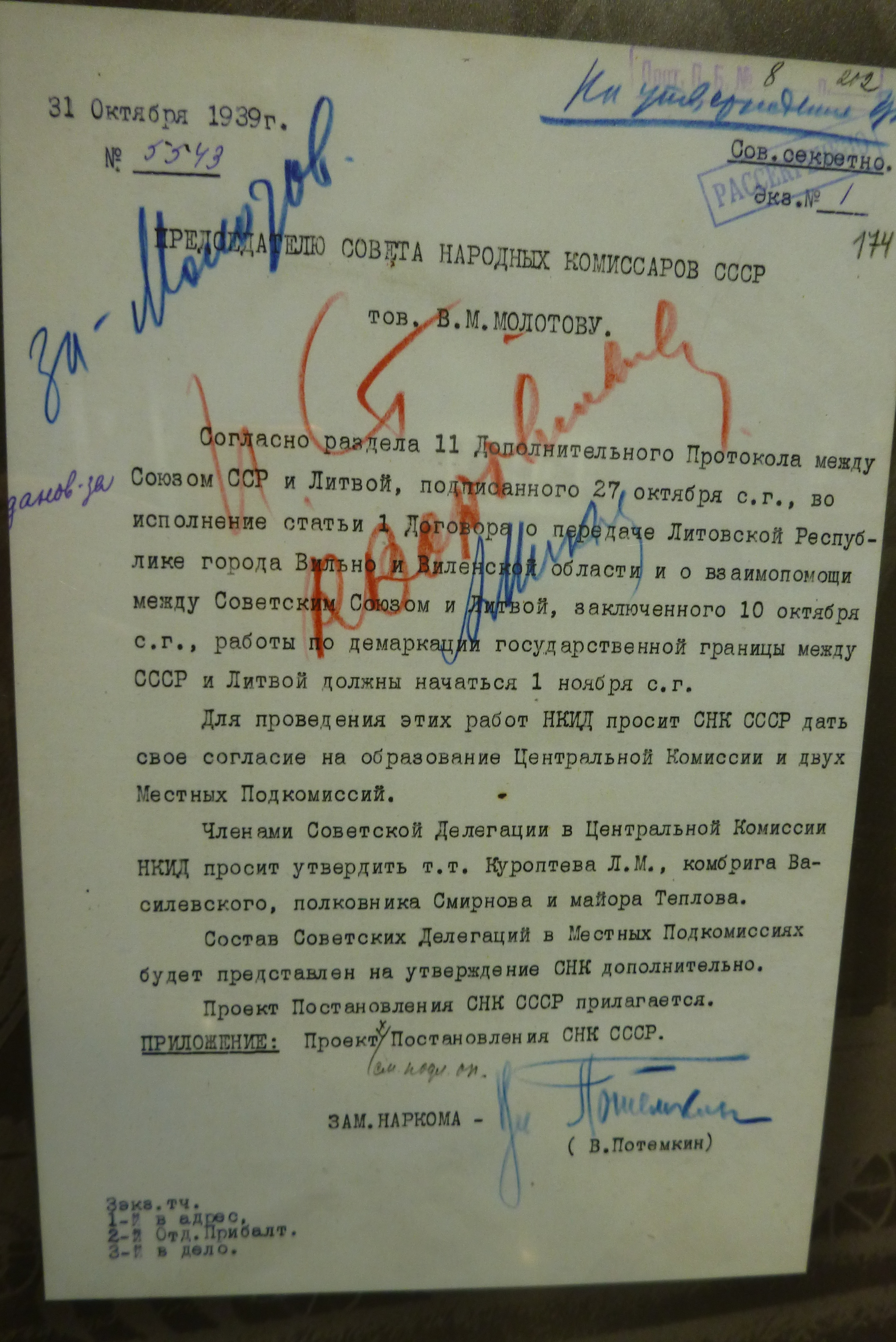
Memorandum from Vladimir Potemkin to Vyacheslav Molotov regarding the appointment of a commission to demarcate the state border between Lithuania and Soviet Western Belarus (after the transfer of Vilnius to Lithuania). 31 October 1939

After the German invasion of Poland on 1 September 1939, Lithuania was pressured by German diplomacy to enter Vilnius. Despite the idea's popularity among the Lithuanian public, the Lithuanian government rejected it. German pressure ceased on September 16. A day later, the USSR began its aggression against Poland and the borders were crossed by the Red Army, which occupied Vilnius on the night of September 18–19, after fighting the Polish Army units defending the city. Vilnius became the unofficial capital of Western Belarus, and a brief period of Belarusization began for the region, which the Belorussian Communists believed would soon be incorporated into Soviet Belarus.

On 19 September, Lithuanian envoy in Moscow Ladas Natkevičius claimed Lithuanian rights to Vilnius. After the new German-Soviet border was established on 28 September, the Soviets invited the Lithuanians to talks. Negotiations lasted from 3 October to 10. The result of the talks was the "Treaty on Mutual Assistance and Transfer of Vilnius and Vilnius Region to Lithuania," under which, in exchange for Vilnius, Lithuania agreed to establish Soviet military bases on its territory. The treaty was ratified by the Lithuanian Seimas on 14 October. Lithuanian diplomats did not doubt that the presence of Soviet troops meant preparation for annexation. During negotiations, the Soviets threatened to annex Vilnius to Soviet Belarus and even to reconstitute the Lithuanian-Belarusian SSR. In addition, Lithuania received only a fragment of territory that Soviet Russia had recognized as part of Lithuania under the Soviet–Lithuanian Peace Treaty of 12 July, 1920. Lithuania annexed most of Wilno-Troki County with Vilnius, half of Święciany County, and parts of Grodno, Lida, Oszmiany, and Brasław counties. Soviet troops remained in Lithuanian-ruled Vilnius region, deploying in Naujoji Vilnia, Gaižiūnai, Prienai and Alytus.

Polish envoy in Kaunas Franciszek Charwat submitted a protest note on behalf of the Polish government. The Lithuanian side responded that Vilnius was and is an inseparable part of Lithuania, which Poland occupied since 1920. According to Polish military attaché Leon Mitkiewicz-Żołłtek, the Lithuanians' response was even harsher; they were to state that they did not recognize the Polish government in Paris, and for them, Poland ceased to exist. In response, Charwat left Lithuania, thus breaking off Polish-Lithuanian relations. Michał Römer (Mykolas Römeris), a Lithuanian specialist in international law and rector of University of Kaunas, argued that Lithuania had not violated Poland's sovereignty because it had taken over its capital peacefully, from the state under whose administration it was temporarily located. He argued that, from the Lithuanian point of view, Poland had never acquired the right to possess Vilnius, so in view of this, Lithuania remained neutral with respect to Poland. On 18 October 1939, the Polish government lodged a formal protest to the government of Lithuania and other countries with which it had diplomatic relations against Lithuania's takeover of Vilnius.

The Lithuanian public generally welcomed the news of the annexation of Vilnius with enthusiasm, and mass demonstrations took place in Kaunas. Left-leaning journalist Justas Paleckis gave a gratitude speech toward the Soviet Union, in which he demanded freedom for political prisoners and the resignation of President Smetona; for this, he was sent to the Dimitravas forced labor camp. However, most of the better politically oriented Lithuanian intelligentsia realized that this was only a prelude to the occupation of Lithuania by Soviet forces.

Throughout the interwar period, official propaganda for the recapture of Vilnius portrayed the city as a country suffering from poverty and backwardness under Polish rule; the ongoing hostilities compounded this impression. As a result, there were initiatives in Lithuania to send humanitarian aid to Vilnius, and an official proclamation issued on 13 October called for this. The director of the Kaunas State Theater, Antanas Juška, headed the Relief Committee for the Vilnius Country.

On 19 October, the Soviet Workers' Guard was disbanded. As early as 22 October, Lithuanian flags appeared on buildings in Vilnius, and the first Lithuanian officials also arrived in the city and began forming a Lithuanian militia. Soviet units were leaving the city, carrying out looting. In addition, about 3,000 Jewish residents of the city were allowed to leave for the depths of the USSR - mainly those previously involved in the formation of the foundations of Soviet power.

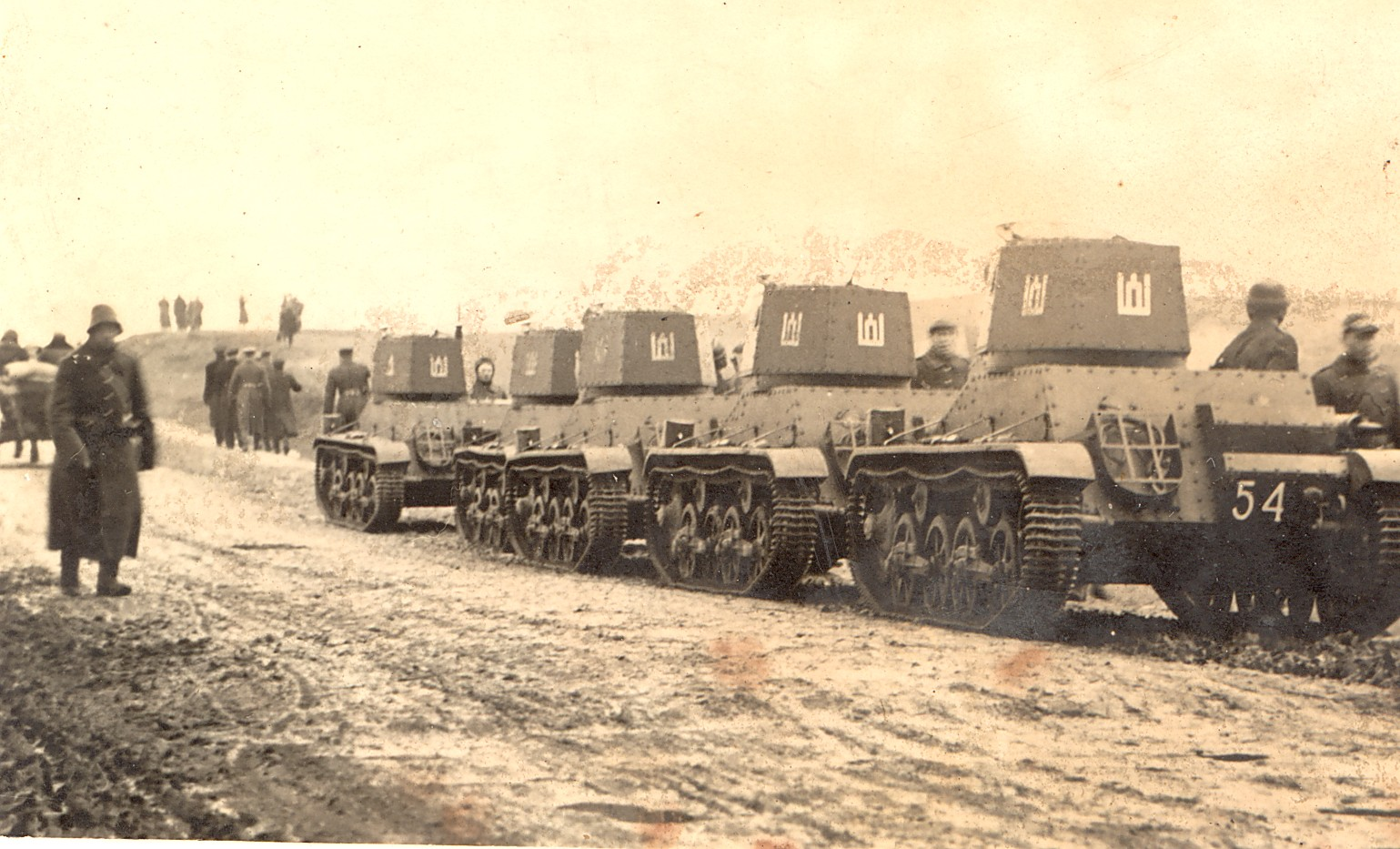
Lithuanian Vickers M1936 light tanks on their way to Vilnius

Lithuanian troops crossed the Polish-Lithuanian border in several places. The main route of the march led from Kaunas through the border crossing at Zawiasy, where the barrier was ceremoniously sawed through, and border wreaths were burned. On 28 October, Lithuanian army units, commanded by Vincas Vitkauskas, entered Vilnius. The encroaching troops were welcomed by delegations of Vilnius Lithuanians, Byelorussians, Tatars, Jews, and Polish Krajowcy. The parade in the city was recorded on color film. Volunteers were brought in from Kaunas, Lithuania, to form a cheering crowd in honor of the Lithuanian army.

Polish residents of the city greeted the Lithuanian army with indifference, and sometimes with interest. The general feeling was that Lithuanian rule in Vilnius would be short-lived. There was also a prevailing sense of relief at the end of the Soviet occupation, during which 348 people were arrested and deported, among them political leaders and university professors. Polish Archbishop of Vilnius Romuald Jałbrzykowski refused to greet Lithuanian troops by ringing bells, and during his sermon called the Lithuanians the next occupiers. The very next day, a Polish patriotic demonstration was organized, attended by about 700-800 people; the police dispersed it.

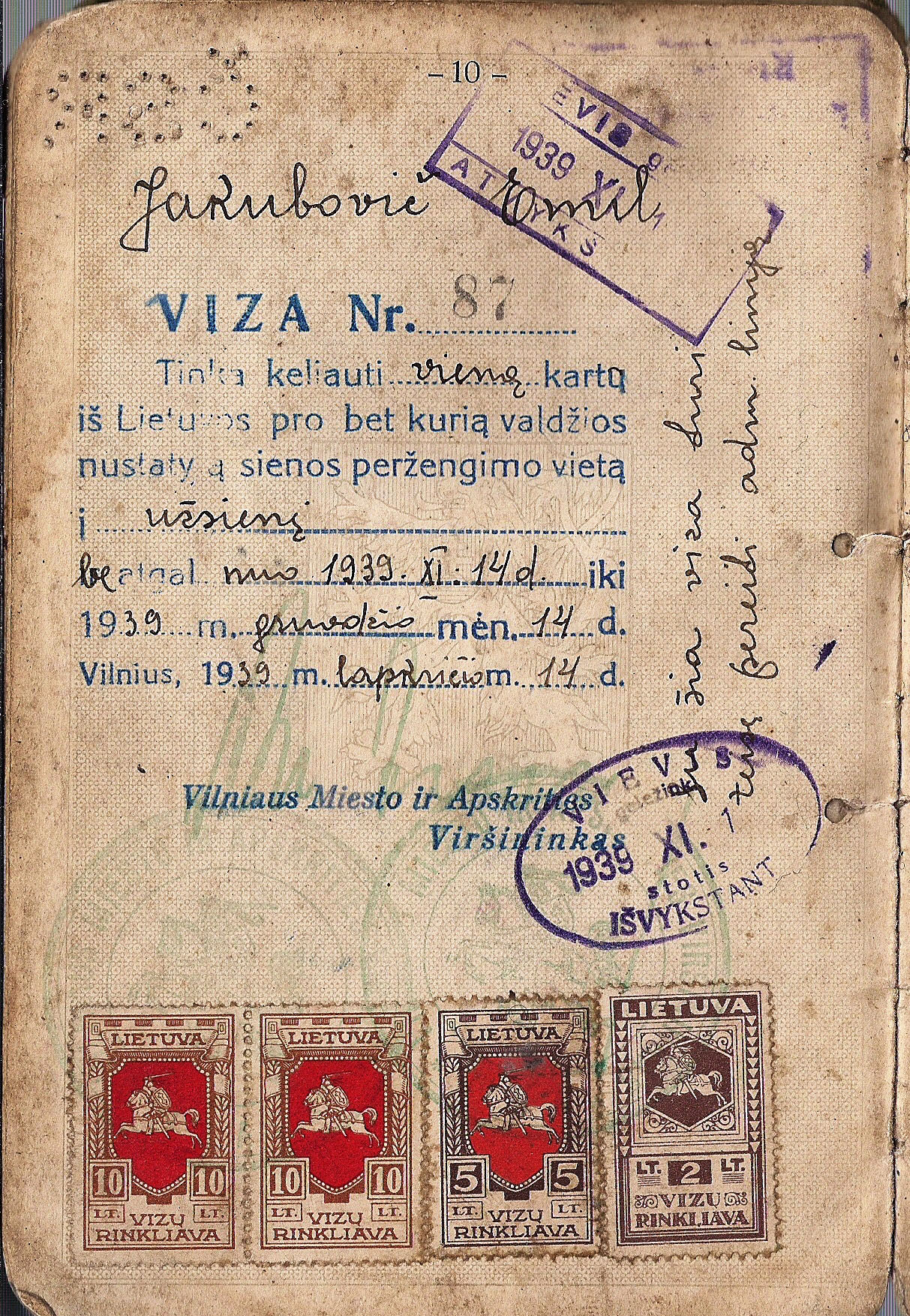
Vilnius issued visa from 1939 when the city was under Lithuanian control.

== Demographics of the region ==
The actual demographics of the region, and especially the ethnic breakdown, are difficult to determine mainly because the area that began to be ruled by Lithuania crossed the Polish administrative division, so that Polish statistics from the 1931 census cannot be a direct basis for making estimates. The Polish population dominated in and around Vilnius, while the Lithuanian population was in the minority, grouped in the southwestern slice of Wilno-Troki County and parts of Święciany County. The areas of pre-war Poland, where the concentration of Lithuanian population was greatest, were outside the Lithuanian administration.

In Vilnius alone, the number of Lithuanians ranged between 1.4 and 7 thousand. This number, as a result of immigration from Kaunas, has risen to 30-40 thousand. Making an accurate estimate is also prevented by population shifts related to the war effort. In Vilnius alone, at the end of October 1939, there were 18,000-20,000 refugees, half of whom were Jews.

Two Lithuanian researchers, Leonas Sabaliūnas and Regina Žepkaitė, have made their own estimates of the area's demography under Lithuanian rule, which differ significantly.

	Leonas Sabaliūnas		Regina Žepkaitė	
Poles	321,700	59%	180,000	39,37%
Jews	107,600	19,5%	156,000	34,16%
Belarusians	75,200	13,7%	–	–
Lithuanians	31,300	5,7%	88,000	19,23%
Other	13,200	2%	33,000	7,24%
Total	549,000		457,000	

== Economy of the region ==
The Vilnius region was hit quite hard by the hostilities and the month-long Soviet occupation. There were many refugees from other regions of Poland, and unemployment and food prices were rising. The Lithuanian government made an effort to relieve the major problems plaguing the region. In the fall of 1939, a mandatory loan of 50 million litas was dispersed to Vilnius. It was charged to civil servants' salaries and to income tax payers. By the end of April, the budget had received 30.1 million litas. This allowed Vilnius's budget to be set at 28.5 million litas, exceeding the pre-war Polish budget; the Lithuanian press emphasized this heavily. Additional funds were used to invest in urban infrastructure.

Less successful was the fight against unemployment. At the beginning of December 1939, there were 8815 unemployed people in Vilnius; later, the number only increased. This was caused by the paralysis of industry related to the loss of markets; this was equally true for all of Lithuania, whose trade had collapsed due to the outbreak of war. The reason was also the deliberate activity of the Lithuanian authorities to close Polish enterprises and cooperatives and replace them with Lithuanian ones.

Poverty began to prevail in the city. The authorities estimated the number of people in need of permanent support at 150,000, but they themselves were able to assist 25,000, and the Red Cross assisted a further 27,000. When distributing aid, the Lithuanian authorities preferred groups considered loyal; thus aid was directed primarily to the Lithuanian population, followed by members of the Belarusian and Jewish minorities. Very little aid was given to Polish Army reservists.

Lithuanian policy toward the peasants was much friendlier, and efforts were made to win them over, primarily through land reform. This was also intended to weaken the Polish landed gentry. A significant concession was their exemption from taxation for the second half of 1939. However, the land reform was very limited in scope, covering only estates of more than 150 hectares, of which there were not many in Vilnius (about 114), primarily the estates of the Sołtans and Tyszkiewiczs. In total, the acreage subject to reform was less than 20,000 hectares. The expropriation proceeded very slowly; in principle, only forest areas were covered. When receiving land, priority was given to Lithuanian army volunteers from Vilnius, as well as those persecuted by the Polish government for their Lithuanian activities during the interwar period. The symbol of the failure of the land reform was the expropriation of 185 hectares of the Andrzejowo estate, which belonged to Gen. Lucjan Żeligowski. This was presented in the press as an act of historical justice. In fact, immediately after the expropriation, the property was leased to Żeligowski's brother-in-law, Petras Kaziunas, married to his sister Maria.

== The course of the Lithuanian rule ==
=== Lithuanian plans for the Vilnius region ===
Although the Lithuanian authorities treated Vilnius as their state's legitimate capital, for fear of unrest in the city, they decided not to transfer all offices from Kaunas immediately. Vilnius was transformed into a special administrative unit headed by a Lithuanian government commissioner. The first of these was Antanas Merkys, who spoke Polish well and made some conciliatory decisions toward Poles (including approval for the resumption of the Polish press and the establishment of the Polish Committee), but his successor, Kazys Bizauskas, advocated a stricter policy toward Poles.

According to the Lithuanian government, the primary goal during the transition period was the full Lithuanization of Vilnius, meaning the full domination of Lithuanians in political and cultural life. At the outset, the idea of granting autonomous status to Vilnius was rejected, as this would not have been accepted by public opinion, as well as the German and Soviet governments. The Lithuanian intelligentsia was divided into two camps. The moderate party, centered on the magazine Naujoji Romuva, advocated gradual Lithuanianization, the introduction of extensive land reform, and tolerance for the non-Lithuanian population. On the other wing was the nationalist party with its organ Vairas, which advocated immediate Lithuanianization and exclusion of the Polish population from public life. Both parties shared the view that the majority of Vilnius residents were Lithuanians who had lost their national consciousness and were undergoing Polonization, but who racially belonged to the Lithuanian nation. Even the moderate wing called for separating war refugees and newcomers who appeared in Vilnius after 1920 from the local Polish community, deeming those impossible to "relithuanize".

The Nationalist Union, ruling Lithuania in an authoritarian manner, was closer to the latter option. President Antanas Smetona himself declared that the state's task was to make Vilnius "more Lithuanian," but he faced significant internal pressure from national circles. Moreover, the conviction of the final nature of the border changes and that even if Poland were to be restored after the war, it would not encompass the eastern territories encouraged them to take a hard line. Also crucial were the transformations the Germans made in the Polish territories: the destruction of any signs of Polish autonomy and the creation of the General Government. Germany also pressured Lithuania to take a hard line against the Poles.

=== First days ===
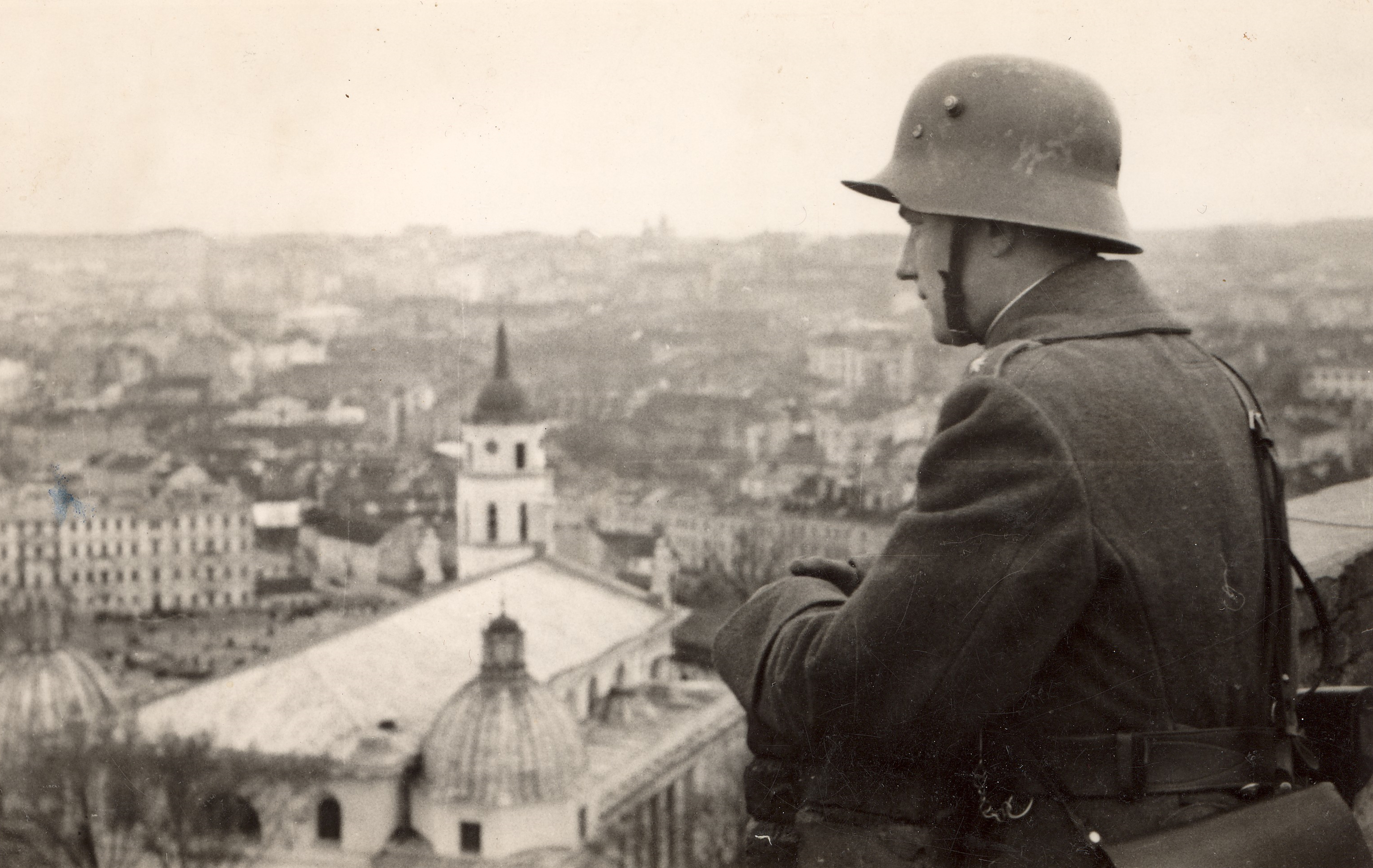
Lithuanian soldier observing captured Vilnius

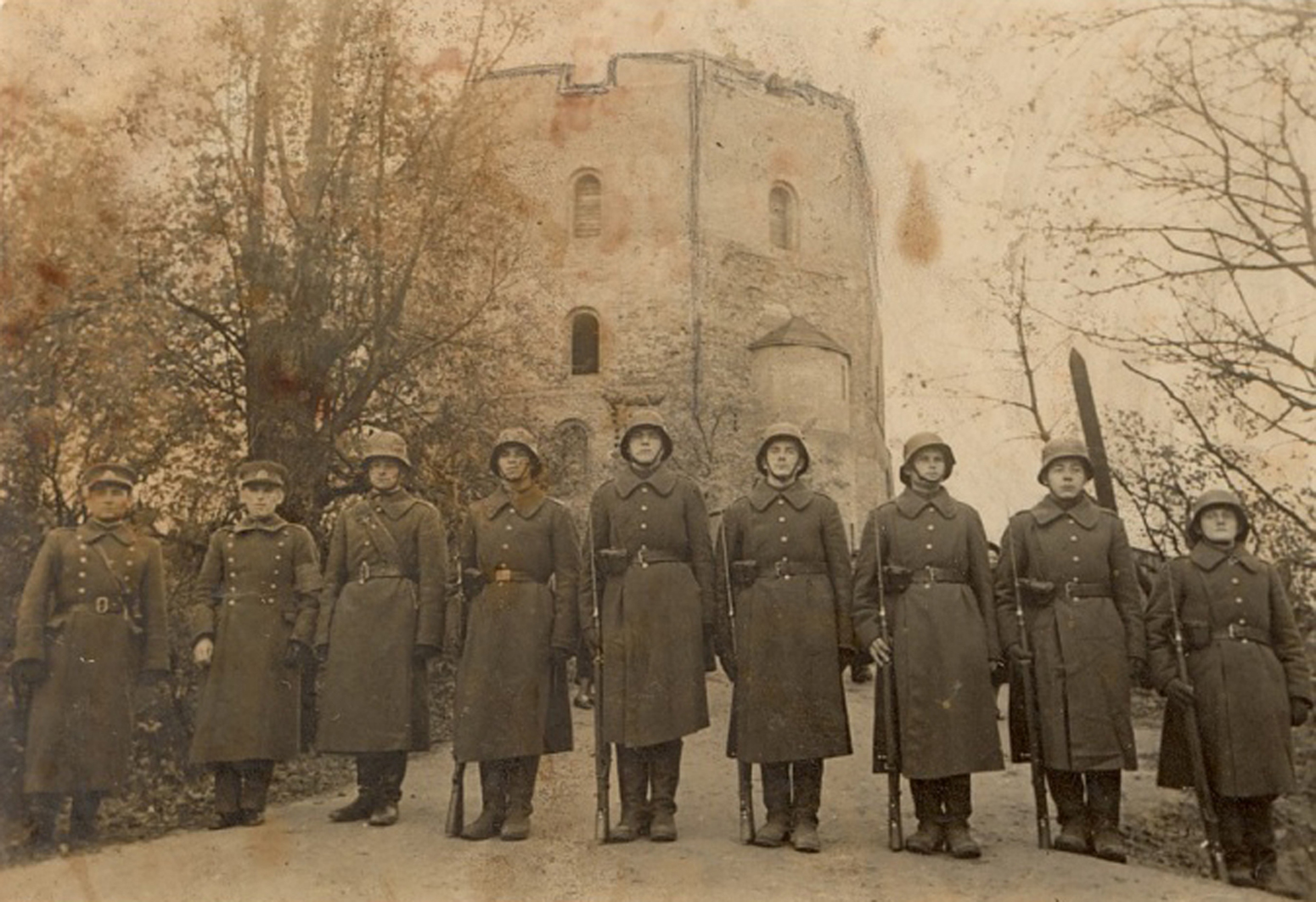
Lithuanian soldiers on the Upper Castle in Vilnius, on the Gediminas' Hill

One of the first decisions of the Lithuanian authorities, on 30 October, was to forcibly exchange Polish currency for Lithuanian, at an unfavorable rate of 5 to 1. This triggered further increases in food prices, which in turn led to more protests in the city, this time organized by leftist circles. The next day, the protests continued from the morning, with pro-Soviet slogans appearing. The protesters were opposed by Endecja aligned militias. The situation turned into an anti-Jewish pogrom, which ended only with the intervention of the Lithuanian police and the Soviet army. During the pogrom, 200 stores, houses, and apartments were damaged, and about 200 people were beaten, 22 severely.

The next day, All Saints' Day (1 November), there were more demonstrations, and a demonstration of several thousand at the Ross cemetery. On All Souls' Day (2 November), there was another demonstration of 20,000 Poles, this time legal, but which also escalated into clashes with the police. Similar demonstrations also took place in other towns in the region, including Naujoji Vilnia, Maišiagala, and Lentvaris.

The result of the demonstration was the decision to reduce the currency exchange rate to a ratio of 2 to 1. Lithuanian propaganda tried to exploit the anti-Jewish incidents by portraying Poles as fierce antisemites and making concessions to the Jewish population, including the introduction of Yiddish broadcasts on Vilnius radio.

=== Stripping of the civil rights of the Polish population ===
On 27 October, the Law on Citizenship of the Residents of Vilnius and Vilnius Region was passed. The law recognized as "aliens" (Lithuanian: Svetimšalis), who were deprived of civil rights, all persons who were not able to prove that at the age of 18 they had lived in Lithuania within the 1939 borders on 12 July 1920 (the date of the signing of the Lithuanian-Soviet Peace Treaty)) and on 27 October 1939. The problem with the law was that it concerned two specific dates; because both fell within the period of warfare, many people were unable to provide proper evidence. The law provided facilities for acquiring citizenship for persons who did not meet these conditions, but claimed to be Lithuanian nationals or were "meritorious to Lithuania".

The process of granting citizenship began on 30 November 1939. "Aliens" had their freedom of movement restricted (they could only leave their place of residence for 7 days with the permission of the local police station), they were deprived of the right to engage in wage labour, except for agriculture, belonging to social organisations, practising medicine or law, running pharmacies, bookshops or publishing houses, working in public offices, owning property, and even talking in public places. A severe restriction was preventing relatives who found themselves under German occupation from being brought to Vilnius region. The Lithuanian authorities also refused to pay pensions and allowances to foreigners, despite the seizure of huge assets accumulated by the Polish Universal Mutual Insurance Company. These restrictions were aimed at inducing Poles to leave Vilnius or declare Lithuanian nationality.

Out of Vilnius' population of 200,000, only 30,000-40,000 were granted citizenship. In May 1940, there were 97,893 "aliens" in the Vilnius region, of whom 87,616 were in Vilnius. Those who managed to maintain their citizenship were forced to indicate their Lithuanian nationality in their passports and to Lithuanianise their names. The Lithuanian government also attempted the removal of "aliens" and refugees from the city and by the start of the Soviet occupation, had succeeded in removing 5,220 people, including 1,975 Poles and 3,425 Jews.

=== Closure of non-Lithuanian organizations ===
The incidents in the early days of the Lithuanian administration led to a tougher stance by the Lithuanian authorities, taking the form of accelerated and forced Lithuanization. The Lithuanian language was made compulsory in offices and workplaces. Clerks who did not speak the language were dismissed. As part of this process, street names, signboards, advertisements, and school curricula were replaced with Lithuanian ones, and Polish emblems were removed. By the decision of the Lithuanian authorities, all Polish provisions and laws ceased to be valid on 27 October 1939, and the country became subject to Lithuanian law.

In practice, this meant the liquidation of all organizations that, in Lithuanian interpretation, operated under foreign law. As a result, 202 Polish organisations (including Stefan Batory University), 176 Jewish i 4 Belarusian became illegal. Trade unions were also abolished in this way, and in their place, the Lithuanian government established corporate labor chambers modeled on fascist ones. From then on, the trade unions operated semi-legally, but this also came to an end with the preventive arrest of trade union leaders just before 1 May 1940.

=== Lithuanization of the Church ===
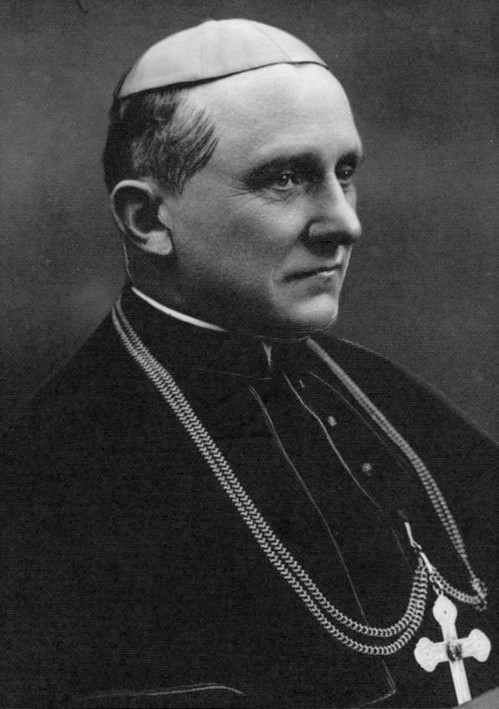
Archbishop of Vilnius Romuald Jałbrzykowski

The Lithuanian authorities had an aversive attitude towards Archbishop Romuald Jałbrzykowski, who was accused of Polish nationalism and the Polonisation of the Church in Lithuania. The authorities tried to have the Holy See remove Jałbrzykowski from his position and incorporate Vilnius into the Lithuanian ecclesiastical province, but their efforts failed.

In the spring of 1940, the Lithuanian authorities tried to introduce the Lithuanian language into the churches, resulting in another wave of riots and clashes with the police. In addition, groups of Lithuanian students provoked incidents in churches where Polish masses were celebrated, jamming the services with loud singing of Lithuanian religious songs. The Polish Committee stood up for Polish rights in the churches, but its intervention was ignored. Inspired by the Polish underground, a silent anti-Lithuanian demonstration took place in Vilnius on 15 May. Lithuanian pressure eventually led to the introduction of services in Lithuanian in the more important churches of Vilnius.

=== Cultural life ===
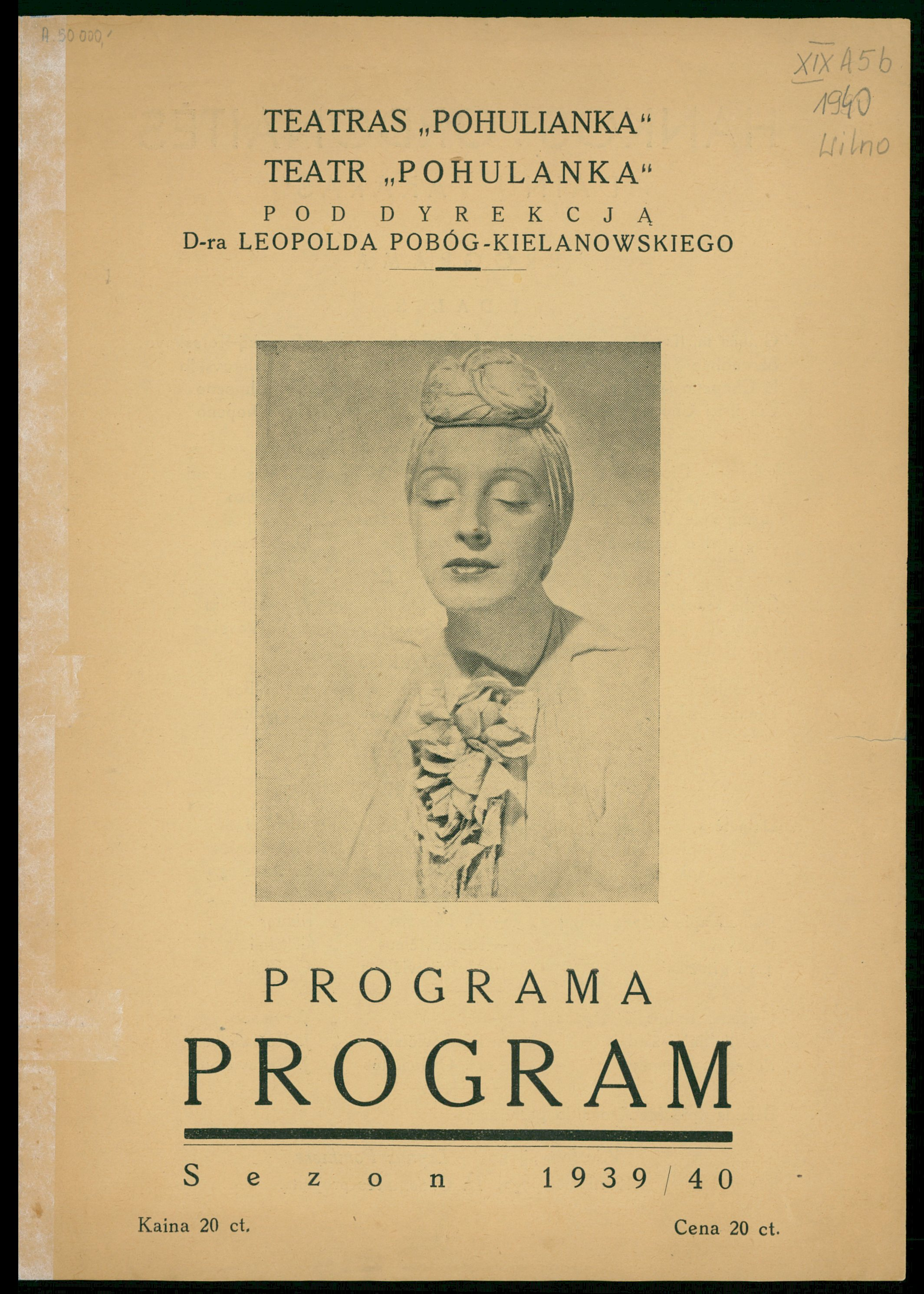
Program of the Pohulanka Theatre in Polish and Lithuanian for the 1939–1940 season

During the period of Lithuanian rule, the Polish population was able to enjoy a certain freedom in cultural life, e.g., in autumn 1939, the publication of the Kurier Wileński (Vilnius Courier) and Gazeta Codzienna (Daily Newspaper) was resumed, as well as the distribution of the Kaunas-based Chata Rodzinna (Family Cottage) and Dzień Polski (Polish Day). Polish films were screened in cinemas, which was met with outrage by Lithuanian nationalist circles. On 11 November 1939, celebrations of the Polish Independence Day also took place, although the orders of the Lithuanian authorities limited their nature. There were also Polish theatres in Vilnius, where refugees from areas occupied by the Third Reich and the USSR also performed, and new books by Polish authors were sold and even published. On the other hand, in February 1940, under the pretext of saving paper, the Kaunas weekly magazines Głos Młodych and Chata Rodzinna were closed down. At the beginning of 1940, the Lithuanian press began criticizing the existence of Polish theatres, which led to the closure of some of them.

=== Lithuanisation of education ===
In Lithuanian-administered territories, there were 46 kindergartens, 486 primary schools, 23 gymnasia, 17 secondary schools, 5 teachers' schools, 26 vocational schools, and two Polish institutions of higher education. Due to the war and the Soviet occupation, many schools were deprived of teachers, and the Lithuanian government also decided to dismiss half of the Polish teaching staff immediately. Their place was taken by Lithuanians, often with low qualifications. There was also a gradual replacement of Polish with Lithuanian. The number of Polish language lessons in schools was reduced, and Lithuanian language and history and geography of Lithuania were introduced.

This led to a protest by Polish schoolchildren on December 3–6, 1939. The result was the removal of around 200 students from schools and the dismissal of 11 teachers. This did not stop the conflicts in schools, which actually lasted until the start of the Soviet occupation.

On 15 December 1939, Stefan Batory University in Vilnius was closed down. By June 1940, the majority of Polish gymnasia and pro-gymnasia had also been liquidated, and gymnasia operating in pre-war Lithuania were closed down. Primary schools fared better during the liquidation operation. The Polish university was replaced by the Lithuanian university, which became operational in January 1940, with Ignas Končius as its rector. The two faculties, humanities and law, which were transferred from Kaunas University, had 1,061 students. The new institution aimed to educate the new Lithuanian intelligentsia of Vilnius and cadres for Lithuanian offices.

=== Transferring the capital to Vilnius ===
According to the Lithuanian constitution, Vilnius was the capital from the moment of the state's creation, while Kaunas served as capital only temporarily. After the annexation of Vilnius, the city did not assume the role of a proper capital at once; the process was gradual and was not completed until Lithuania lost its independence. The first step towards this was the external Lithuanization of the city: the removal of Polish signs, inscriptions, and local names, and the removal of Polish uniforms from public service employees.

An important step towards giving the city a Lithuanian appearance was to change the names of the streets. Initially, the plan was to translate most of the names into Lithuanian, but eventually, the option to change the names and patrons of most streets prevailed. Names clearly associated with Poland were changed, so Lucjan Żeligowski Street was renamed to Klaipėda Street, Józef Piłsudski Street to Algirdas Street, and 3 May Street to 16 February Street. A symbolically significant change was the renaming of the city's main artery, Mickiewicz Street, to Gediminas Street. One of the streets in Žvėrynas (Ziwerzyniec) district has been named after Mickiewicz. One of the few names that remained was Antoni Wiwulski Street. By the beginning of May 1940, 490 streets had been renamed; the names of the remaining 153 streets, 12 markets, 13 squares, 11 cemeteries, and 5 mountains had been changed by the end of the Lithuanian rule.

Many central celebrations were organized in the city to emphasize the capital's character. On 10 December 1939, the Congress of Commanders of the Lithuanian Riflemen's Union was held in Vilnius, gathering about 1,000 participants. On 1 June 1940, the Congress of Mayors of Lithuanian Cities was held in Vilnius, highlighting the transfer of leadership of Lithuanian cities from Kaunas to Vilnius. On 29–30 June 1940, a festival of Lithuanian art was organized in Vilnius to begin the program to celebrate the 600th anniversary of the death of Grand Duke Gediminas, the founder of Vilnius.

On 2 June 1940, the office of the Commissar of the Government of Lithuania was abolished, and the incorporation of Vilnius into the Lithuanian administrative system began, but these activities were interrupted by the Soviet Union's annexation of Lithuania.

== Polish resistance and conspiracy ==
=== Polish Committee ===
Polish society tried to oppose the repressive actions of the Lithuanian government. The semi-official representation of Polish society became the Polish Committee, headed by Bolesław Krzyżanowski, which Antanas Merkys approved on 6 November 1939. The Committee conducted its activities openly. However, it had limited capacity; its activities were essentially confined to sending resolutions and protests to the Lithuanian local and central authorities, which were mostly ignored. The Polish Committee included representatives of science and culture, as well as representatives of the main political parties: Maciej Dobrzański from the PPS, Aleksander Zwierzyński from the National Party, and Witold Staniewicz representing the Sanacja camp.

=== Secret teaching ===
Society's response to the Lithuanization of education and the closure of Polish schools and universities was the organization of secret teaching. The closure of the Stefan Batory University on 15 December 1939 did not put an end to its activities; the University Senate, headed by Rector Stefan Ehrenkreutz, continued to meet secretly, and lectures and examinations were held. At the beginning of 1940, an Aid Committee for former university employees was organized, headed by Stefan Kempisty.

=== Conspiracy ===
From the very beginning of the Lithuanian administration, secret political and military organizations began emerging. One of the first was the Government Commissariat, founded in Vilnius at the turn of September and October 1939, by Rajmund Gostkowski and Bronisław Świątnicki. It was an anti-Sanation organization, with a peasant orientation. Contrary to its name, it had no contacts with the government-in-exile, but only with the Polish missions in Kaunas and Riga. At the head was an unknown commander with the pseudonym "Jołan" (probably it was Gostkowski). The Department B (intelligence) was commanded by Zygmunt Sroczyński, and the Military Department by Antoni Olechnowicz ("Meteor"). The Lithuanian police were investigating the organization. It had up to 400 members.

Based on the military units stationed in the Vilnius region, as well as those interned in Lithuania, underground Regimental Circles began to form. They were headed by Lt. Col. Adam Obtułowicz "Leon". The main aim of the Circles was to organize help and support for soldiers, organize escape routes to the west, and continue the fight for Poland's freedom. The Civil Commissioner, appointed by the commandant, was Józef Święcicki. There was also a youth organization attached to the Regimental Circle, headed by Major Władysław Zarzycki 'Rojan'.

The Union of Free Poles was founded on the night of 17–18 September 1939, as the armed arm of the pre-war League of Free Poles; it was a synarchic organization based on Christian doctrine. Student Jan Kazimierz Mackiewicz headed it; its sympathizer and protector was Lt Col Edward Perkowicz. Mackiewicz adopted the pseudonym "Konrad" and became the group's commander.

The Union of Independence Fighters was founded on 18 October 1939, on the 18th anniversary of the 13th Vilnius Scout Troop's founding, as a scout conspiracy. It was headed by scoutmaster Józef Grzesiak "Czarny".

Associated with the National Democracy was the National Military Organization (NOW), which was formed after the Lithuanians entered Vilnius. The commander of NOW was Modest Gramz "Maurycy". The organization soon joined the ranks of the mainstream Service for Poland's Victory. The ONR-Falanga milieu founded the Military Organization of the Fighting Nation, as early as September 1939, headed by Antoni Rymaszewski.

A smaller Sanacja-associated organization was the Committee for Struggle for Liberation, founded at the end of September 1939 by Major Władysław Kamiński "Śliwa". Witold Staniewicz led the other Sanacja-associated organization: Independence Camp. The Organization of Fighting Poland was fairly strong in Vilnius; it was involved in propaganda and was distinguished by the radio station it owned, from which broadcasts were made under the name Radio Wolność (Freedom).

The Polish Socialist Party had two clandestine organizations in Vilnius: the Socialist Fighting Organization and the Socialist-Independentist Organization "Freedom". Both subordinated themselves to the Service for Poland's Victory at the beginning of 1940. The Catholic-Socialist organization was People's Action, led by Father Henryk Hlebowicz.

The largest secret youth organization was the Young Eagles. The women's organization, organized by female activists of the Polish Military Organization, was led by Jadwiga Łukaszewiczowa.

At the turn of November and December 1939, the Provincial Command of the Service for Poland's Victory (SZP) was established, to be headed by Colonel Janusz Gaładyk "Strzała", who had arrived from Warsaw, but was arrested by the Lithuanian police and imprisoned in Kaunas Fort VI. Thanks to the mediation of Father Kazimierz Kucharski, the Regimental Circles were incorporated into the SZP, and their commander, Lt. Col. Obtułowicz, became the provincial commander of the SZP in Vilnius. However, Obtułowicz was unpopular because he was associated with the Sanacja regime, and his place was taken by Lt Col Nikodem Sulik. These changes were accepted by the headquarters in Warsaw.

== Annexation of Lithuania by the Soviet Union ==
In early June, the USSR issued an ultimatum to Lithuania, demanding the formation of a friendly government and the freedom for its troops to remain on Lithuanian territory. In practice, this meant the full annexation of Lithuania by the USSR. The Lithuanian government accepted the terms of the ultimatum on the night of 14–15 June. One of the last decisions of the Lithuanian government before the USSR's occupation of Lithuania was an order dated 14 June 1940, by which the Minister of Education ordered the closure of two of the three Polish secondary schools in the Kaunas region and the liquidation of all eight primary schools.

== Bibliography ==
- Buchowski, Krzysztof (2019). "Pogrom w Wilnie 31 października 1939 r." [Pogrom in Vilnius on October 31, 1939]. In Grabski, August (ed.). Pogromy Żydów na ziemiach polskich w XIX i XX wieku. T. 4, Holokaust i powojnie (1939–1946) [Pogroms of Jews on Polish lands in the 19th and 20th centuries. Vol. 4, Holocaust and post-war (1939–1946)] (in Polish). Warszawa. pp. 25–44.
- Buchowski, Krzysztof (2004). "Litwa wobec ludności polskiej od września 1939 do czerwca 1940 roku" [Lithuania towards the Polish population from September 1939 to June 1940]. In Konopka, Hanna; Boćkowski, Daniel (eds.). Polska i jej wschodni sąsiedzi w XX wieku. Studia i materiały ofiarowane prof. Dr. hab. Michałowi Gnatowskiemu w 70-lecie urodzin [Poland and its eastern neighbors in the 20th century. Studies and materials dedicated to Prof. Ph.D. Michał Gnatowski on his 70th birthday] (PDF) (in Polish). p. 336.
- Duda, Roman (2017). "Okupacja Wilna i smierc Kempistego" (PDF). Antiquitates Mathematicae. 11: 47–59.
- Kasperavičius, Algis (1995). "Stosunek władz i społeczeństwa Litwy do Polaków na Wileńszczyźnie (wrzesień 1939-czerwiec 1940)" [Attitude of Lithuanian authorities and society towards Poles in Vilnius region (September 1939-June 1940)]. In Giżejewska, Małgorzata; Strzembosz, Tomasz (eds.). Społeczeństwo białoruskie, litewskie i polskie na ziemiach północno-wschodnich II Rzeczpospolitej w latach 1939-1941 [Belarusian, Lithuanian and Polish society in the northeastern lands of the Second Polish Republic in 1939-1941] (in Polish). Warsaw.
- Łossowski, Piotr (1981). "Kształtowanie się polityki litewskiej wobec obszarów przyłączonych jesienią 1939 r" [The development of Lithuanian policy towards the areas annexed in the fall of 1939]. Studia z dziejów ZSRR i Europy Środkowej. XVII. Wrocław: 139–167.
- Mačiulis, Dangiras; Staliūnas, Darius (2015). Lithuanian Nationalism and the Vilnius Question, 1883-1940. Marburg. ISBN 978-3-87969-401-3.
- Niwiński, Piotr (2000). "Konspiracja polska na Wileńszczyźnie w latach 1939–1941" [Polish conspiracy in the Vilnius region in 1939–1941] (PDF). Zeszyt Naukowy Muzeum Wojska (in Polish). 14.
- Srebrakowski, Aleksander (2002). Polacy w Litewskiej SRR [Poles in the Lithuanian SSR]. ISBN 8373221638.
- Wołkonowski, Jarosław (1996). Okręg Wileński Związku Walki Zbrojnej Armii Krajowej w latach 1939-1945 [Vilnius District of the Union of Armed Struggle Home Army in 1939-1945] (in Polish). Warsaw.
- Żurawski, Jacek (2022). "Wileńska prasa konspiracyjna 1939–1945" (PDF). Wydawnictwo Naukowe Muzeum Niepodległości.
