= Wilno County, Wilno Land =

County of Republic of Central Lithuania and Wilno Land, Poland

Wilno County
- County of Central Lithuania and Wilno Land
- 1920–1921 (de facto); 1920–1923/1924 (de jure)
- Location within Wilno Land
- Capital: Wilno
  - Type: County
- History
  - Formation of Republic of Central Lithuania: 13 December 1920
  - Informal unification with Troki County: 1921
  - Formal transformation into Wilno-Troki County: 1923/1924
- Contained within
  - Country: Central Lithuania (de facto 1920–1921, de jure 1920–1922); Second Polish Republic (de jure 1922–1923/1924)
  - District: Wilno Land (de jure 1922–1923/1924)
Preceded by	Succeeded by
Vilensky Uyezd	Wilno-Troki County; Wilno

Wilno County (Note: Polish: Powiat wileński; Lithuanian: Vilniaus apskritis.) was a county with capital in Wilno located in the Republic of Central Lithuania, and later de jure in Wilno Land, Second Polish Republic. Between 1920 and 1922 it was a county in Republic of Central Lithuania, established in place of former Vilensky Uezd, Vilna Governorate. In 1922, following the incorporation of Central Lithuania into Poland, the county become a part of then established Wilno Land. In 1921, the county had informally united with Troki County, and between 1923 and 1924 they had been formally transformed into Wilno and Troki County. In 1921, from the county was separated city of Wilno, that was reformed into a separate county.

== Administration division ==
=== Urban municipalities ===
- Wilno (1920–1921)
- Nowa Wilejka

=== Rural municipalities ===
- Worniany
- Mejszagoła
- Mickuny
- Niemenczyn
- Rzesza
- Soleczniki
- Szumsk
- Turgiele
- Podbrzezie
- Rudomino

== See also ==
- Vilnius District Municipality

== Bibliography ==
- Zeszyt VII. Spis ludności na terenach administrowanych przez Zarząd Cywilny Ziem Wschodnich (grudzień 1919). Lviv/Warsaw. Książnica Polska T-wa Naucz. Szkół Wyższych. 1920, p. 50, series: Prace geograficzne wydawane by Eugenjusz Romer.
- Zarząd Cywilny Ziem Wschodnich (19 lutego 1919 – 9 września 1920) by Joanna Gierowska-Kałłaur, 1st addition. Warsaw. Wydawnictwo Neriton. Instytut Historii PAN. 2003. p. 447. ISBN 83-88973-60-6.
