= Wilno and Troki County =

County of Republic of Central Lithuania and Wilno Land, Poland

- County of Wilno Land and Wilno Voivodeship
- Location within Wilno Land
- Capital: Vilnius (extrateritorially)
  - Type: County
- Contained within
  - Country: Central Lithuania (de facto 1921–1922); Poland (de jure 1923/1924–1939, de facte 1922–1939)
  - District: Wilno Land (de jure 1923/1924–1926, de facte 1922–1926)
  - Voivodeship: Wilno Voivodeship (1926–1939)
Preceded by	Succeeded by
Wilno County; Troki County	Lithuania

Wilno and Troki County (Polish: Powiat wileńsko-trocki; Lithuanian: Vilniaus-Trakų apskritis) was a county with capital in Vilnius located in Wilno Land, and later, Wilno Voivodeship, in Poland. It originated from informal unification of administration, between the counties of Wilno and Troki, that existed from 1921 to 1922 within the Republic of Central Lithuania, and from 1922 to 1923 or 1924 in Poland. Between 1923 and 1924, two counties were officially joined to form one county, that until 1926 was located in Wilno Land, and from 1926 to 1939, in Wilno Voivodeship.

== Municipalities ==
=== Urban ===
- Nowa Wilejka
- Trakai

=== Rural ===
- Gierwiaty
- Mejszagoła
- Mickuny
- Niemenczyn
- Olkieniki
- Orany (1926–1939)
- Podbrzezie
- Rudomino
- Rudziszki
- Rzesza
- Soleczniki
- Szumsk
- Troki
- Turgiele
- Worniany
- Janiszki (until 1926)
- Koniawa (1926–1930)

== Citations ==
=== Bibliography ===
- Zeszyt VII. Spis ludności na terenach administrowanych przez Zarząd Cywilny Ziem Wschodnich (grudzień 1919). Lviv/Warsaw. Książnica Polska T-wa Naucz. Szkół Wyższych. 1920, p. 50, series: Prace geograficzne wydawane by Eugenjusz Romer.
- Zarząd Cywilny Ziem Wschodnich (19 lutego 1919 – 9 września 1920) by Joanna Gierowska-Kałłaur, 1st edition. Warsaw. Wydawnictwo Neriton. Instytut Historii PAN. 2003. p. 447. ISBN 83-88973-60-6.
