= Zygmunt Fedorowicz =

Polish botanist, educator and politician

Zygmunt Józef Albin, Pani Maria
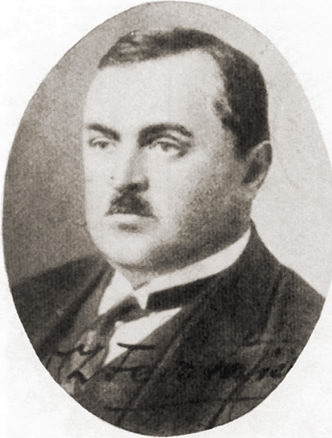
- Born: March 11, 1889; Warsaw
- Died: February 3, 1973 (aged 83); Warsaw
- Spouse: Maria Juriewicz
- Children: Zdzisław Fedorowicz
- Scientific career
- Fields: Botany, History of Zoology

Zygmunt Józef Fedorowicz, alias "Albin" (11 March 1889 – 3 February 1973), was a Polish botanist, educator and politician, during World War II District Government Delegate for Wilno in years 1942–44.

== Biography ==
His parents were Karol and Anna Fedorowicz. He graduated in 1908 from a secondary school run by Emilian Konopczyński. Already in 1909 he was imprisoned for his educational activities among workers. He left the country and in 1909-1910 studied the Faculty of Mathematics and Philosophy of the University of Louvain, Belgium. He then took up studies at the Jagiellonian University in Kraków from 1911 to 1914. From 1914 he conducted faunal research in the vicinity of Vilnius, where he settled and took up teaching work. He was active in Polish educational organizations. In 1918 he became director of the Joachim Lelewel Gymnasium in Vilnius.

In 1919, he was elected to the Vilnius city council. During the Polish-Bolshevik war, he joined the Polish army in July 1920. He then became involved in the government structures of Central Lithuania, becoming deputy director of the Department of Education. In 1921 he took part as an expert in the Polish-Lithuanian negotiations in Brussels. In 1922, he became First Deputy Speaker of the Central Lithuanian Sejm.

In 1921, he became director of the Sigismund Augustus Gymnasium in Vilnius. He held this position until 1924 when he became an inspector of schools and head of the secondary school department at the Vilnius School District Superintendency. He was removed from the latter position after the May Coup of 1926, due to his connections with the National Party. He was transferred into retirement in 1930. After the Soviets occupied Vilnius in 1940, he was imprisoned in Kaunas. After his release in 1941, he became involved in the Polish underground on behalf of the National Party. In March 1942, he took office of the District Government Delegate for Wilno.

In August 1944, after the Soviets reoccupied Vilnius, he was arrested. In November 1945, he was sentenced to 10 years in the camps, and returned to Poland in December 1955. Until his retirement in 1960, he worked as an associate professor at the Institute of Zoology of the Polish Academy of Sciences in Warsaw. He died in Warsaw on February 3, 1973.

Zygmunt Fedorowicz was awarded the Officer's Cross of the Order of Polonia Restituta (1923), the War Order of Virtuti Militari V Class, (1944), the Golden Cross of Merit with Swords (1944) and the Cross of the Home Army (1970).

== Bibliography ==
- Rokicki, Paweł (2015). Glinciszki i Dubinki. Zbrodnie wojenne na Wileńszczyźnie w połowie 1944 roku i ich konsekwencje we współczesnych relacjach polsko-litewskich [Glinciszki and Dubinki. War crimes in the Vilnius Region in mid-1944 and their consequences in contemporary Polish-Lithuanian relations] (PDF). Monografie (in Polish). Warsaw: Institute of National Remembrance. ISBN 978-83-8229-224-4.
- Łoza, Stanisław (1938). Czy wiesz kto to jest? [Do you know who this is?] (in Polish). Warsaw: Wydaw. Głównej Księgarni Wojskowej.
