= Wilno Voivodeship (1926–1939) =

Former voivodeship of Poland

Coordinates: 54°40′50″N 25°16′12″E

Wilno Voivodeship Województwo wileńskie
- Voivodeship of Poland
- 1926–1939
- Coat of arms

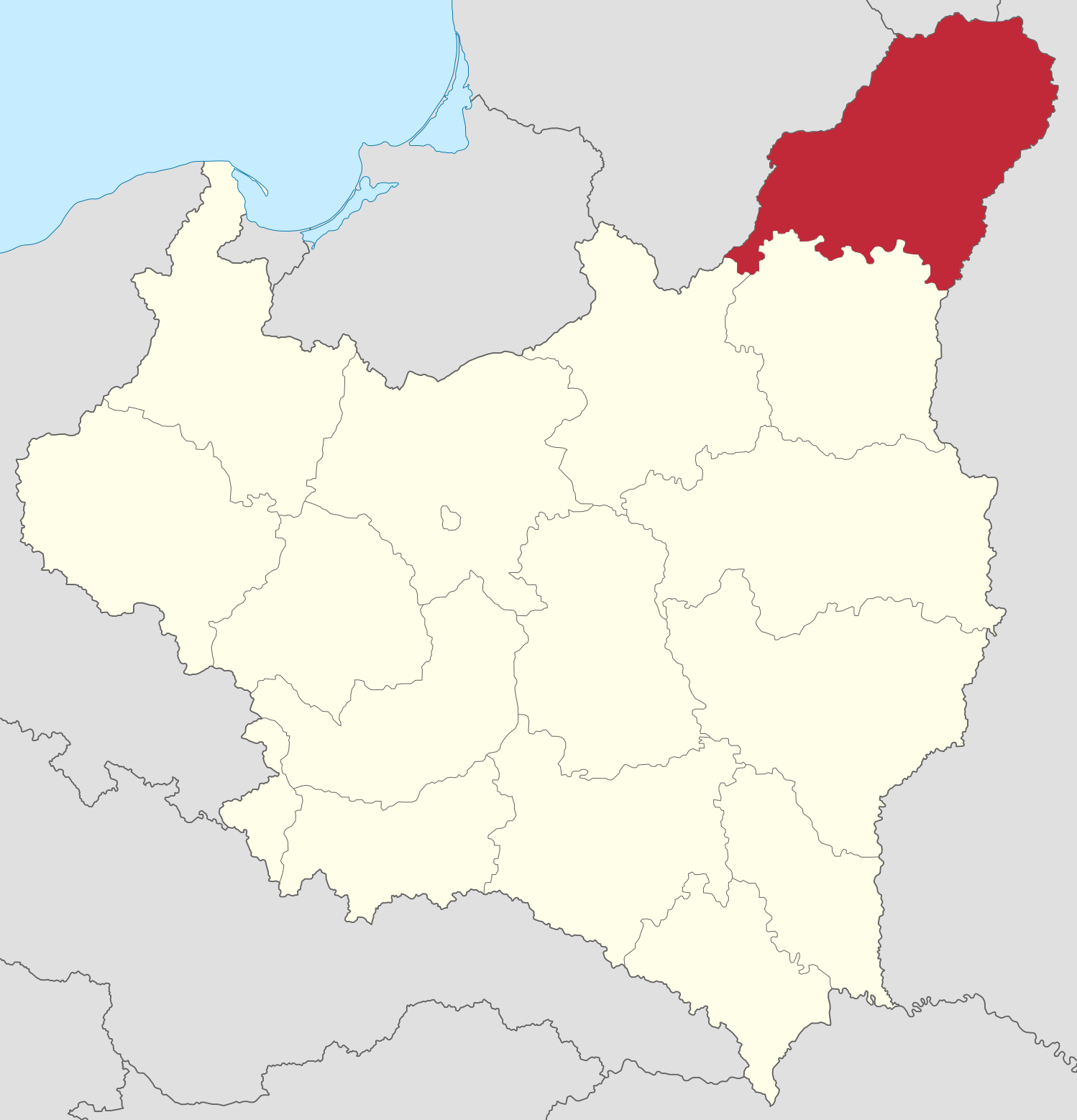
- Location of Wilno Voivodeship (red) within the Second Republic of Poland (1938).
- Capital: Wilno
- Area
  - 1921: 29,109 km^{2} (11,239 sq mi)
  - 1939: 29,011 km^{2} (11,201 sq mi)
- Population
  - 1921: 1,005,565
  - 1931: 1,276,000
- Government
  - Type: Voivodeship
- Voivodes
  - 1926–1931: Władysław Raczkiewicz
  - May–Sep 1939: Artur Maruszewski
- Historical era: Interwar period
  - Established: 20 January 1926
  - Soviet invasion: 17 September 1939
- Political subdivisions: 9 powiats
| Preceded by | Succeeded by |
| Wilno Land | Vileyka Voblast; Republic of Lithuania |
- Today part of: Lithuania, Belarus

The Wilno Voivodeship (Polish: województwo wileńskie) was one of 16 Voivodeships in the Second Polish Republic, with the capital in Wilno (now Vilnius, Lithuania). The jurisdiction was created in 1926 and populated predominantly by Poles, with notable minorities of Belarusians, Jews and Lithuanians. Before 1926, the voivodeship's area was known as the Wilno Land; it had the same boundaries and was also within the contemporary borders of Poland at the time.

The total area of Wilno Voivodeship was 29,011 km^{2} (11,201 sq mi), with a population of 1.276 million. Following the German and Soviet invasion of Poland and the reshaping of Europe, Poland's borders were redrawn at the insistence of Soviet leader Joseph Stalin at the Tehran Conference. Wilno Voivodeship was incorporated into the Lithuanian and the Byelorussian Soviet Socialist Republics. Many of the ethnic Polish population were forcibly resettled at the end of World War II. Since 1991, the former territory of the voivodeship is now part of sovereign Lithuania and sovereign Belarus.

== History ==
=== Background ===
After the Third Partition of Poland–Lithuania in 1795, the Vilnius region, like most of Grand Duchy of Lithuania, was occupied by the Russian Empire until World War I. Russian rule in the region was unstable as evidenced by the French invasion of Russia, the Uprisings of 1831 and 1863. In the aftermath of World War I and Russia's internal weakness due to the Russian Civil War, Lithuania and Poland re-established their independence. However, the Polish–Lithuanian War began as a result of conflict between the two countries. In October 1920, Józef Piłsudski, Poland's Chief of State, in order to circumvent the Treaty of Suvalkai, which left Vilnius on the Lithuanian side, organized Żeligowski's Mutiny, to seize Vilnius for Poland. In this false flag operation, the Polish goals of taking over Vilnius were achieved and the Polish puppet state of Central Lithuania was created. In 1922, after a disputed election to the Vilnius Sejm, the parliament voted to incorporate Central Lithuania into the Second Polish Republic.

=== 1920s and 1930s ===
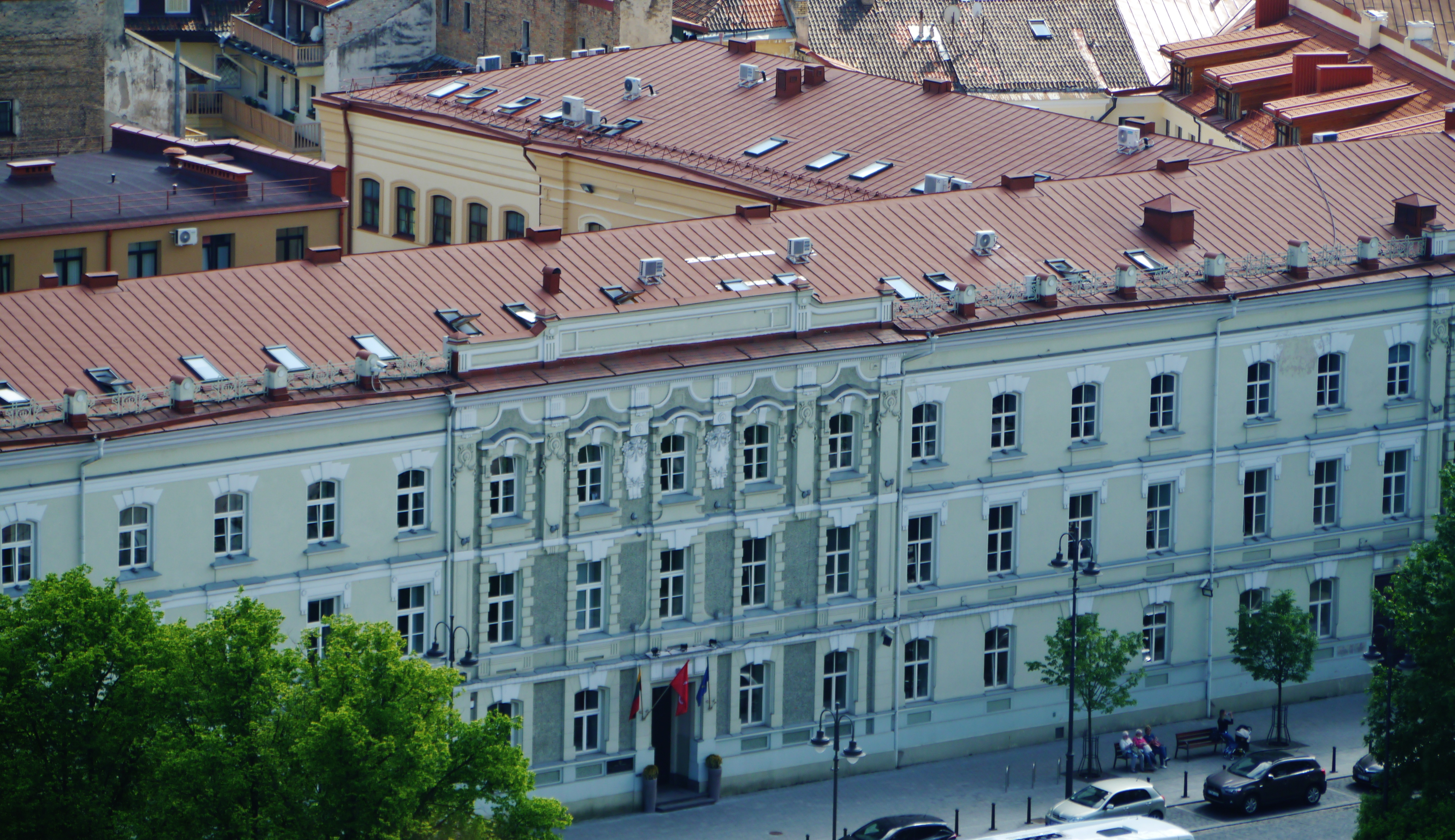
Former Voivodeship office in Wilno, Św. Magdaleny (modern Šventaragio) Street

From 6 April 1922 to 20 January 1926, the territory was known as the Wilno Land (Polish: ziemia wileńska). Wilno Voivodeship was created on 20 January 1926 from the territories of the Wilno Land. On 1 April 1927, Mołodeczno county and was created from parts of Wilejka (5 gminas), Oszmiana (1 gmina), Wołożyń (1 gmina) and Stołpce (1 gmina) countries. On 1 April 1929, Mołodeczno county's Gmina Bienica was dissolved and was bound to Gmina Wojstom of Wilejka county. The same day, Kozłowszczyzna and Norzyca gminas of Postawy were dissolved and passed to Szarkowszczyzna and Głębokie gminas and of Dzisna county, Wierzchnie gmina of Dzisna was dissolved and passed to Postawy county, Gmina Jody of Brasław county was dissolved and was passed to Gmina Szarkowszczyzna of Dzisna county. It was formed as the last of the Polish voivodeships in the interbellum. (The Sandomierz Voivodeship was supposed to be created in late 1939, but never was).

=== World War II ===
Following the Soviet invasion in 1939, the Wilno Voivodeship was divided between the newly created Vileyka Voblast of the Byelorussian SSR and independent Lithuania (from 1940 this was known as the Lithuanian SSR). This division was not internationally accepted. The Polish government-in-exile nominated Zygmunt Fedorowicz in 1942 as its representative for Wilno region. He was arrested by the NKVD in 1944.

Currently the former territory of Wilno Voivodeship is divided between the Vilnius and Utena counties in Lithuania and the Grodno, Minsk and Vitebsk Regions of Belarus.

== Location ==
The Wilno Voivodeship had an area of 29,011 km^{2} (which made it the fourth biggest Polish Voivodeship) and a population (according to the Polish census of 1931) of 1,276,000.

The Voivodeship was located in the country's northeastern corner, bordering the Soviet Union to the east, Lithuania to the west, Latvia to the north, Nowogródek Voivodeship to the south and Białystok Voivodeship to the south-west. The landscape was flat and hilly in parts, with several lakes (such as Narocz, the biggest lake in interwar Poland). As of 1 January 1937, 21.2% of the area was forested (compared to the national average of 22.2%).

== Towns and administrative division ==
Wilno Voivodeship was created after the territory of the Republic of Central Lithuania was merged with the so-called Wilno Area. In the years 1922–1939 it was divided into 9 powiats (counties):

Map of Wilno Voivodeship in 1938

List of Counties with square area and population
| # | Name | CoA | Area | Population |
|---|---|---|---|---|
| 1 | Brasław county | | 4,217 km^{2} (1,628 sq mi) | 143,100 |
| 2 | Dzisna county | | 3,968 km^{2} (1,532 sq mi) | 159,900 |
| 3 | Mołodeczno county | | 1,898 km^{2} (733 sq mi) | 91,300 |
| 4 | Oszmiana county | | 2,362 km^{2} (912 sq mi) | 104,600 |
| 5 | Postawy county | | 3,050 km^{2} (1,178 sq mi) | 99,900 |
| 6 | Święciany county | | 4,017 km^{2} (1,551 sq mi) | 136,500 |
| 7 | Wilejka county | | 3,427 km^{2} (1,323 sq mi) | 131,100 |
| 8 | Wilno city | | 105 km^{2} (41 sq mi) | 195,100 |
| 9 | Wilno - Troki county | | 5,967 km^{2} (2,304 sq mi) | 214,500 * |
* Wilno - Troki county was the biggest in the whole interwar Poland, bigger than the entire Autonomous Silesian Voivodeship

In 1931, the biggest city of the Voivodeship (and the biggest in northeastern Poland) was Wilno, with 195 100 inhabitants. Apart from this city, Voivodeship was sparsely populated and lacked more urban centres. All other towns were very small, none of them reached a population larger than 10 000 (as of 1931).

== Population ==
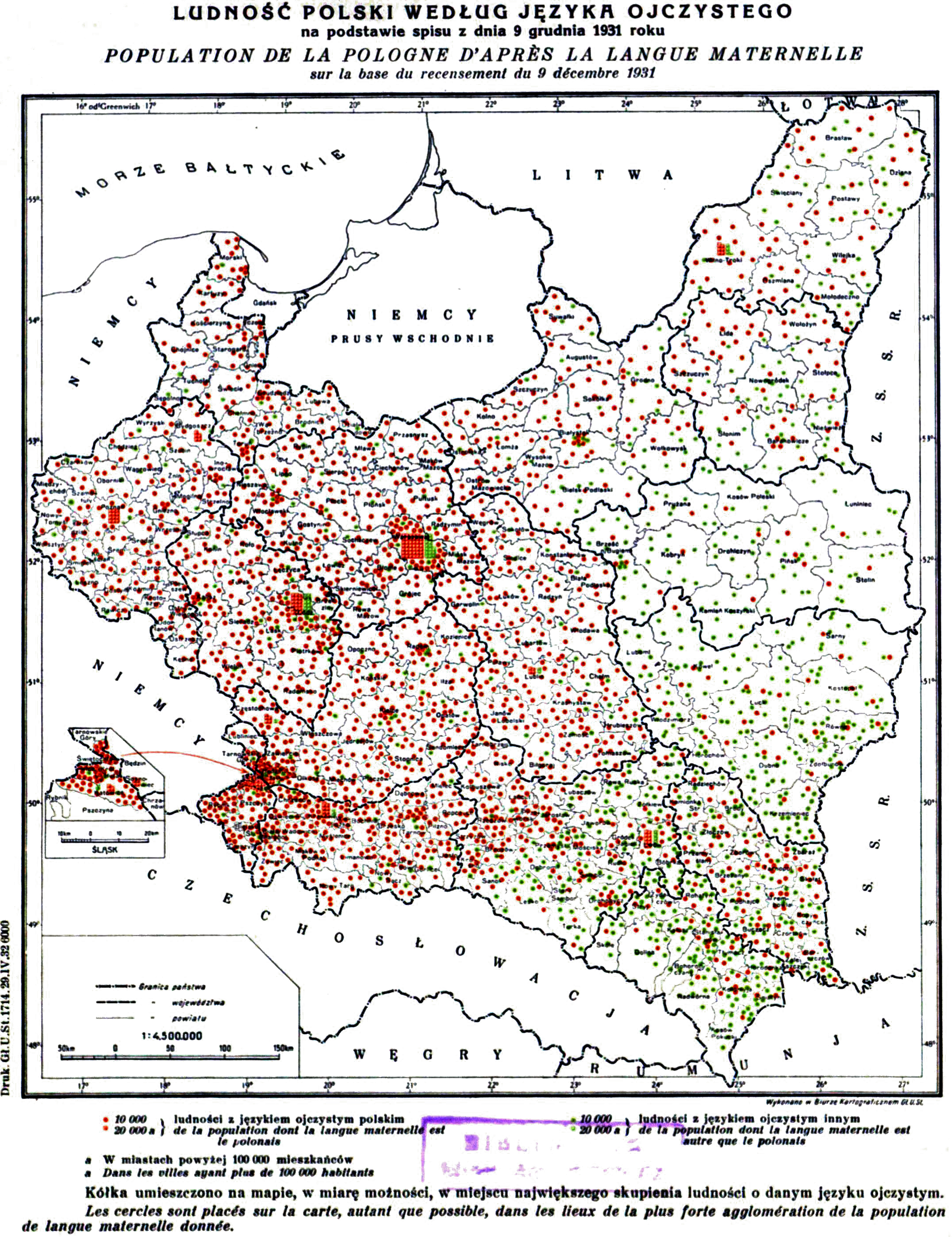
Population in Poland and whether their mother tongue was Polish, according to the Polish census of 1931

According to the Polish census of 1931 the Voivodeship was inhabited by 1,276,000 people. Majority of population was Polish (59.7% claimed Polish as their native tongue). Among minorities there were: Belarusians (22.7%), Jews (8.5%), Lithuanians (5.5%) and Russians (3.4%). The population density was 44 persons per km^{2} (second lowest in Poland, after Polesie Voivodeship). The census has been criticized as inaccurate due to bias against the Belarusians and Lithuanians.

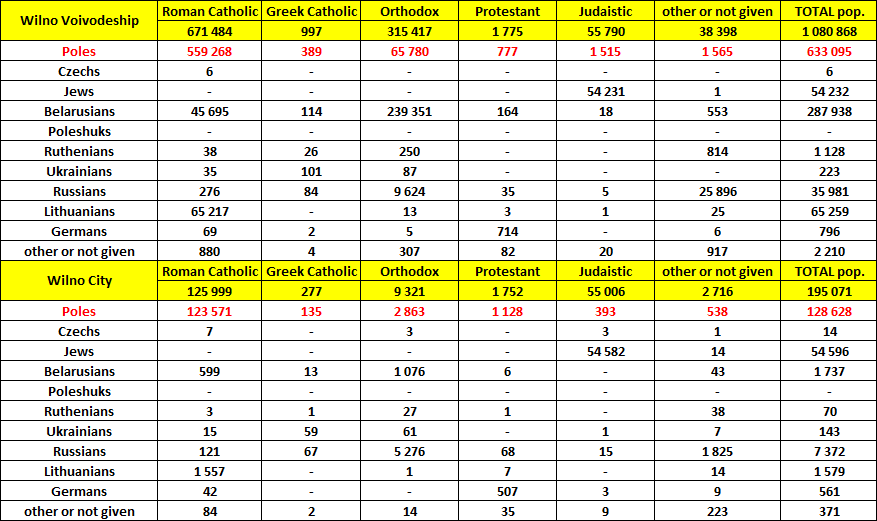
Linguistic and religious structure of the Wilno Voivodeship in 1931

Following the Polish territorial changes after World War II, a significant part of the Polish population was repatriated to the newly formed People's Republic of Poland as Wilno Voivodeship was split and incorporated into the Lithuanian and Byelorussian Soviet Socialist Republics. Many encountered difficulties in the repatriation process and were prevented from leaving. The Polish population that remained in Lithuania was subjected to attempts at Lithuanization (in the 1950s), which were thwarted by Moscow, and to Russification and Sovietization policies.

== Industry and transport ==
Wilno Voivodeship was located in the so-called Poland "B", which meant that it was still underdeveloped, apart from the city of Wilno. A large part of the population was poor, with a high level of illiteracy (in 1931, 29.1% was illiterate, with the national average of 23.1%). Railway network was scarce, with only a few junctions - the most important one at Wilno, also at Molodeczno, Królewszczyzna and Nowa Wilejka. The total length of railroads within Voivodeship's boundaries was 1,097 kilometres, which was only 3.8 per 100 km^{2}.

Elektrit Radiotechnical Society was the largest privately owned company in Wilno. With over 1,100 workers, the society produced around 50,000 radio receivers annually.

== Voivodes ==
Government delegates

- Władysław Sołtan, 4 February 1922 – 6 April 1922
- Walery Roman, 6 April 1922 – 29 August 1924
- Władysław Raczkiewicz, 29 August 1924 – 14 June 1925
- Olgierd Malinowski, 22 December 1925 – 25 May 1926 (acting)

Voivodes

- Władysław Raczkiewicz, 18 May 1926 – 20 June 1931
- Stefan Kirtiklis, 20 December 1930 – 20 June 1931
- Zygmunt Beczkowicz, 20 June 1931 – 27 January 1933
- Marian Styczniakowski, 27 January 1933 – 16 February 1933 (acting)
- Władysław Jaszczołt, 16 February 1933 – 13 October 1935
- Marian Styczniakowski, 14 October 1935 – 4 October 1935 (acting)
- Ludwik Bociański, 4 December 1935 – 19 May 1939
- Artur Maruszewski, 19 May 1939 – 18 September 1939

== 1931 census ==
The results of the 1931 census (questions about mother tongue and about religion) are presented in the table below:

Counties with plurality or majority other than Polish and other than Roman Catholic are highlighted with yellow.

Linguistic (mother tongue) and religious structure of the Wilno Voivodeship according to the 1931 census
| County | Pop. | Polish | Belarusian | Yiddish & Hebrew | Russian | Lithuanian | Other language | Roman Catholic | Orthodox & Uniate | Jewish | Other religion |
|---|---|---|---|---|---|---|---|---|---|---|---|
| Braslaw | 143161 | 65.6% | 16.2% | 5.0% | 10.2% | 2.4% | 0.6% | 62.2% | 20.8% | 5.4% | 11.6% |
| Dzisna | 159886 | 39.0% | 50.0% | 7.4% | 3.2% | 0.1% | 0.3% | 35.6% | 55.1% | 7.5% | 1.8% |
| Molodechno | 91285 | 38.9% | 53.7% | 6.3% | 0.8% | 0.0% | 0.3% | 23.8% | 69.1% | 6.5% | 0.6% |
| Oshmyany | 104612 | 81.2% | 9.7% | 6.4% | 0.9% | 1.5% | 0.3% | 77.8% | 14.5% | 6.7% | 1.0% |
| Pastavy | 99907 | 48.0% | 47.7% | 2.7% | 1.4% | 0.1% | 0.1% | 50.8% | 44.5% | 2.8% | 1.9% |
| Švenčionys | 136475 | 50.1% | 5.9% | 5.6% | 6.4% | 31.5% | 0.5% | 86.1% | 1.4% | 5.6% | 6.9% |
| Vilyeyka | 131070 | 45.4% | 49.1% | 4.5% | 0.7% | 0.0% | 0.3% | 40.6% | 53.9% | 4.7% | 0.8% |
| Vilnius-Trakai | 214472 | 84.2% | 2.6% | 3.0% | 1.7% | 7.9% | 0.6% | 93.7% | 1.4% | 3.1% | 1.8% |
| Vilnius City | 195071 | 65.9% | 0.9% | 28.0% | 3.8% | 0.8% | 0.6% | 64.6% | 4.9% | 28.2% | 2.3% |
| Wilno Voivodeship | 1275939 | 59.7% | 22.7% | 8.5% | 3.4% | 5.2% | 0.5% | 62.5% | 25.5% | 8.7% | 3.3% |

== See also ==
- Vilnius
- Vilnius Region
- Republic of Central Lithuania
- Russian Empire's Vilna Governorate
