= Valčiūnai =

- Town
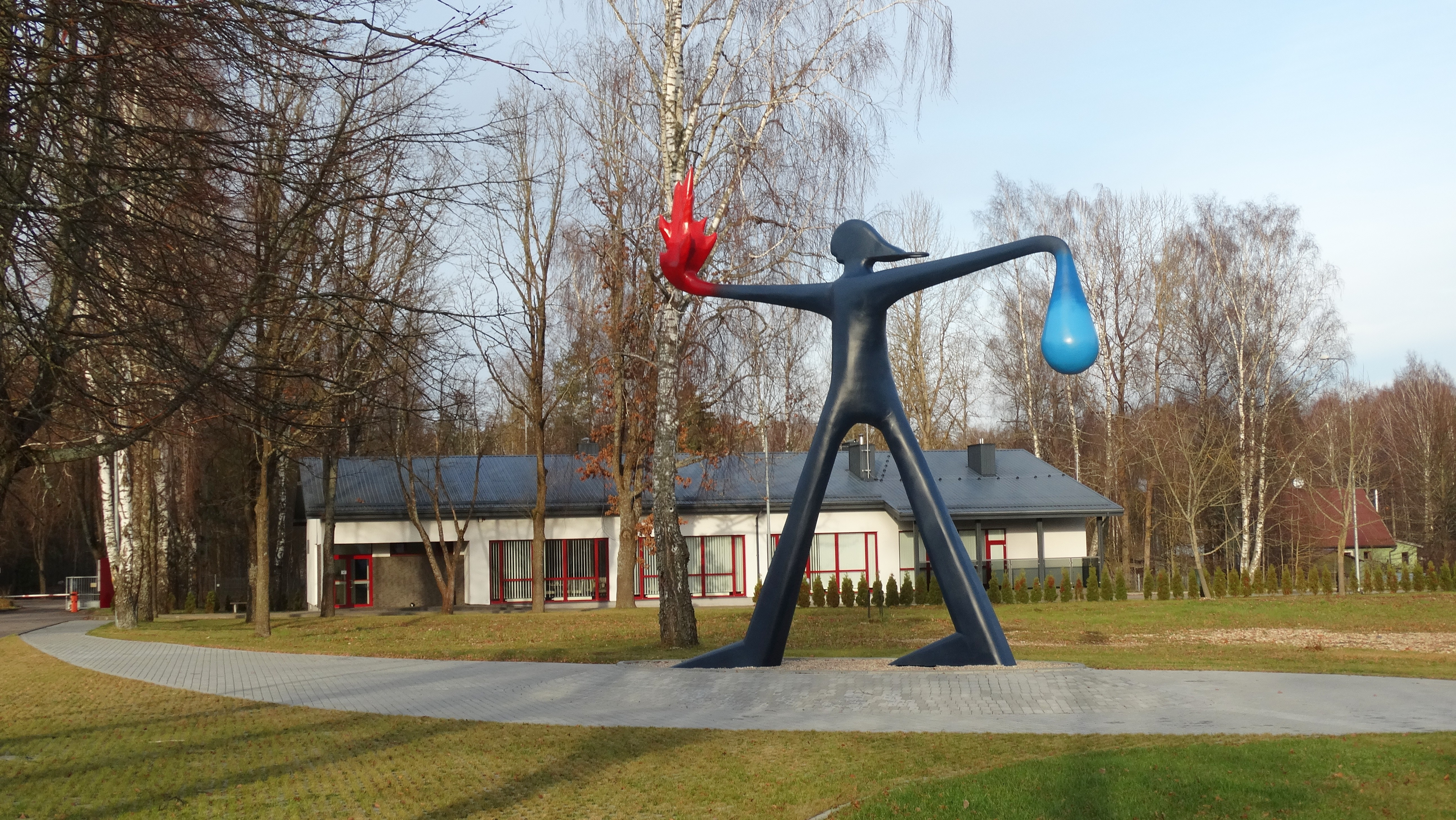
- Sculpture near Valčiūnai firefighter school

- Location of Valčiūnai
- Coordinates: 54°33′40″N 25°15′50″E
- Country: Lithuania
- County: Vilnius County
- Municipality: Vilnius district municipality
- Eldership: Juodšiliai eldership

Population (2011)
  - Total: 1,874
- Time zone: UTC+2 (EET)
  - Summer (DST): UTC+3 (EEST)

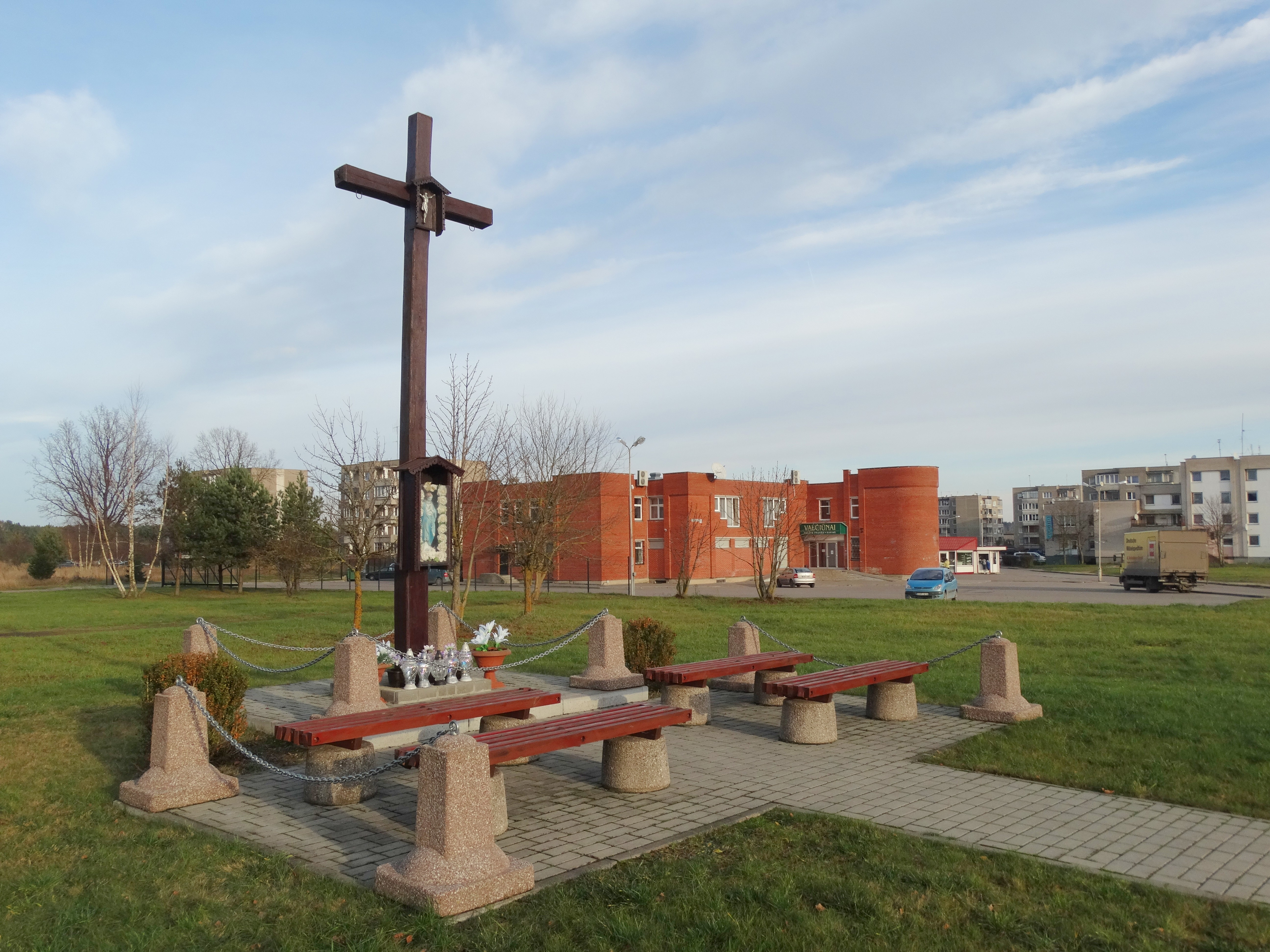
Catholic wooden cross and multi-storey residential housing of Valčiūnai in the distance

Valčiūnai (Polish: Wołczuny) is a town in Vilnius district municipality, Lithuania. According to the 2011 census, it had population of 1,874.
