= Second Polish Republic =

Polish state from 1918 to 1939

Republic of Poland Rzeczpospolita Polska
- 1918–1939
- Flag (1928–1939) Coat of arms (1928–1939)
- Anthem: Mazurek Dąbrowskiego (English: "Poland Is Not Yet Lost") (1927–1939)
- The Second Polish Republic in 1930

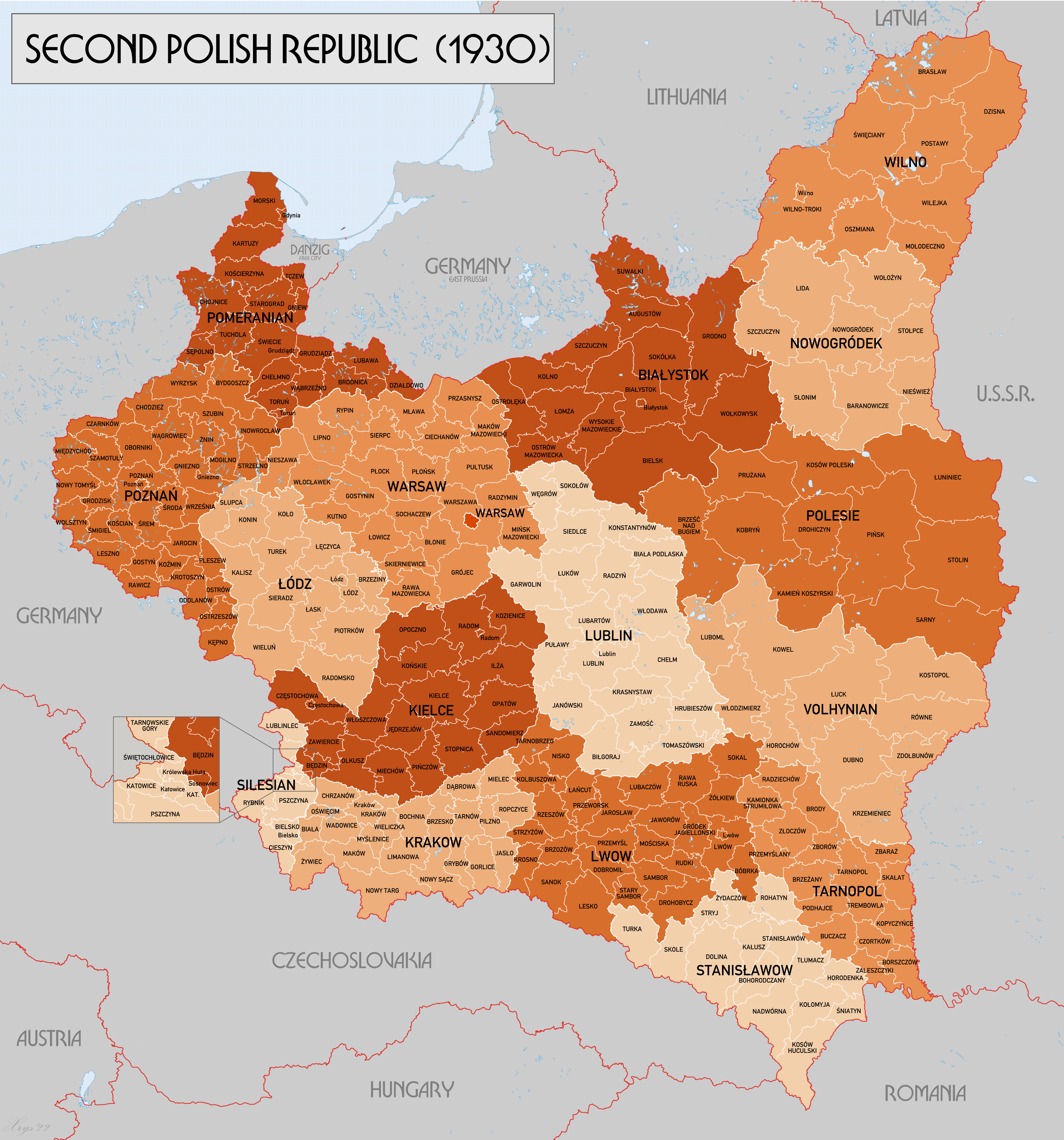
- Administrative divisions of the Second Polish Republic in 1930
- Capital and largest city: Warsaw; 52°13′48″N 21°00′40″E
- Official languages: Polish
- Recognised regional languages: List: German (since 1920) (Note: In Silesian Voivodeship.) Belarusian (since 1924) (Note: In Nowogródek, Polesie, and Wilno Voivodeships (until 1926 Wilno Land) as well as in parts of the Białystok Voivodeship (Grodno and Wołkowysk Counties).) Lithuanian (since 1924) (Note: In the part of Wilno Voivodeship (until 1926 Wilno Land), in Święciany County, and several municipilaties of the Wilno-Troki County.) Ukrainian (since 1924) (Note: In Lwów, Polesian, Stanisławów, Tarnopol, and Volhynian Voivodeships.)
- Religion (1931): Majority: 75.3% Catholicism; 64.8% Roman Catholic; 10.5% Greek Catholic; Minorities: 11.8% Eastern Orthodox; 9.8% Jewish; 2.6% Protestant; 0.5% Other Christian; 0.02% Other
- Demonyms: Polish, Pole
- Government: 1918–1926: Unitary parliamentary republic 1926–1939: Unitary semi-presidential republic: under an authoritarian dictatorship (1930–1939)
- President
  - 1918–1922: Józef Piłsudski (Note: As the Chief of State.)
  - 1922: Gabriel Narutowicz
  - 1922–1926: Stanisław Wojciechowski
  - 1926–1939: Ignacy Mościcki
- Prime Minister
  - 1918–1919 (first): Jędrzej Moraczewski
  - 1936–1939 (last): Felicjan S. Składkowski
- Legislature: Parliament
  - Upper chamber: Senate
  - Lower chamber: Sejm

Establishment
- Historical era: Interwar period • World War II
  - End of the First World War: 11 November 1918
  - Treaty of Versailles: 28 June 1919
  - Peace of Riga: 18 March 1921
  - Sanation coup d'état: 12–14 May 1926
  - German invasion: 1 September 1939
  - Soviet invasion: 17 September 1939
  - Fall of Warsaw: 28 September 1939
  - Complete occupation: 6 October 1939

Area
  - Total: 388,634 km^{2} (150,052 sq mi)

Population
  - 1921: 25,694,700
  - 1931: 31,915,779
- Currency: Marka (until 1924); Złoty (after 1924)
Preceded by
Kingdom of Poland
Republic of Central Lithuania
German Empire
Succeeded by
Military Administration in Poland
Soviet Union
Slovak Republic
Republic of Lithuania
Polish government-in-exile
Republic of Central Lithuania
- Today part of: Poland; Belarus; Ukraine; Lithuania; Czech Republic; Slovakia; Latvia

The Second Polish Republic, (Note: Polish: II Rzeczpospolita, Druga Rzeczpospolita, abbr.: II RP) officially known at the time as the Republic of Poland, (Note: Polish: Rzeczpospolita Polska, lit. 'Commonwealth [of] Poland', abbr. RP; Belarusian: Польская Рэспубліка, romanized: Polskaja Respublika; German: Republik Polen; Lithuanian: Lenkijos Respublika; Ukrainian: Польська Республіка, romanized: Pol's'ka Respublika) was the Polish state that existed between 7 October 1918 and 6 October 1939 after being established in the final stage of World War I. The Second Republic was taken over in 1939 on the eve of its twenty-first anniversary, after it was invaded by Nazi Germany, the Soviet Union, and the Slovak Republic, marking the beginning of the European theatre of the Second World War. The Polish government-in-exile was established in Paris and later London after the fall of France in 1940.

When, after several regional conflicts, most importantly the victorious Polish-Soviet war, the borders of the state were finalised in 1922, Poland's neighbours were Czechoslovakia, Germany, the Free City of Danzig, Lithuania, Latvia, Romania, and the Soviet Union. It had access to the Baltic Sea via a short strip of coastline known as the Polish Corridor on either side of the city of Gdynia. Between March and August 1939, Poland also shared a border with the then-Hungarian governorate of Subcarpathia. In 1938, the Second Republic was the sixth largest country in Europe. According to the 1921 census, the number of inhabitants was 25.7 million. By 1939, just before the outbreak of World War II, this had grown to an estimated 35.1 million. Almost a third of the population came from minority groups: 13.9% Ukrainians; 10% Ashkenazi Jews; 3.1% Belarusians; 2.3% Germans and 3.4% Czechs and Lithuanians. At the same time, a significant number of ethnic Poles lived outside the country's borders.

The Second Republic maintained moderate economic development. The cultural hubs of interwar Poland – Warsaw, Kraków, Poznań, Wilno, and Lwów – became major European cities and the sites of internationally acclaimed universities and other institutions of higher education. Although Polish Jews were some of the biggest supporters of Second Republic leader Józef Piłsudski, even after he returned to politics and staged a coup in 1926, after his death in 1935 the Pilsudskites ruling the Republic began to openly discriminate against its Jewish (and, to a lesser extent, its Ukrainian and Belarusian) citizens, restricting Jewish entry into professions and placing limitations on Jewish businesses.

== Name ==
The official name of the state was the Republic of Poland. In the Polish language, it was referred to as Rzeczpospolita Polska (abbr. RP), with the term Rzeczpospolita being a traditional name for the republic when referring to various Polish states, including the Polish–Lithuanian Commonwealth (considered to be the First Polish Republic, Pierwsza Rzeczpospolita), and later, the current Third Polish Republic. In other regionally-used official languages, the state was referred to as: Republik Polen in German, Польська Республіка (transcription: Polʹsʹka Respublika) in Ukrainian, Польская Рэспубліка (transcription: Poĺskaja Respublika) in Belarusian, and Lenkijos Respublika, in Lithuanian.

Between 14 November 1918 and 13 March 1919, the state was referred to in Polish as Republika Polska, instead of Rzeczpospolita Polska. Both terms mean the Republic; however, republika is a general term, while Rzeczpospolita traditionally refers exclusively to the Polish states. Additionally, between 8 November 1918 and 16 August 1919, the Journal of Laws of the State of Poland referred to the country as the State of Poland (Polish: Państwo Polskie).

Following the end of the Second World War, and the establishment of the later states of the Polish People's Republic and the Third Polish Republic, the historical state is referred to as the Second Polish Republic. In the Polish language, the country is traditionally referred to as II Rzeczpospolita (Druga Rzeczpospolita), which means the Second Republic.

== Background ==
After more than a century of partitions between the Austrian, the Prussian, and the Russian imperial powers, Poland re-emerged as a sovereign state at the end of the First World War in Europe in 1917–1918. The victorious Allies of the First World War confirmed the rebirth of Poland in the Treaty of Versailles of June 1919. It was one of the great stories of the 1919 Paris Peace Conference. Poland solidified its independence in a series of border wars fought by the newly formed Polish Army from 1918 to 1921. The extent of the eastern half of the interwar territory of Poland was settled diplomatically in 1922 and internationally recognised by the League of Nations.

=== End of World War I ===
Over the course of World War I (1914–1918), the German Empire gradually dominated the Eastern Front as the Imperial Russian Army fell back. German and Austro-Hungarian armies seized the Russian-ruled part of what became Poland. In a failed attempt to resolve the Polish question as quickly as possible, Berlin set up the puppet Kingdom of Poland on 14 January 1917, with a governing Provisional Council of State and (from 15 October 1917) a Regency Council (Rada Regencyjna Królestwa Polskiego). The Council administered the country under German auspices (see also Mitteleuropa), pending the election of a king. More than a month before Germany surrendered on 11 November 1918 and the war ended, the Regency Council had dissolved the Provisional Council of State and announced its intention to restore Polish independence (7 October 1918). With the notable exception of the Marxist-oriented Social Democratic Party of the Kingdom of Poland and Lithuania (SDKPiL), most Polish political parties supported this move. On 23 October, the Regency Council appointed a new government under Józef Świeżyński and began conscription into the Polish Army.

=== Formation of the Republic ===
Coat of arms of Poland (1919–1927)

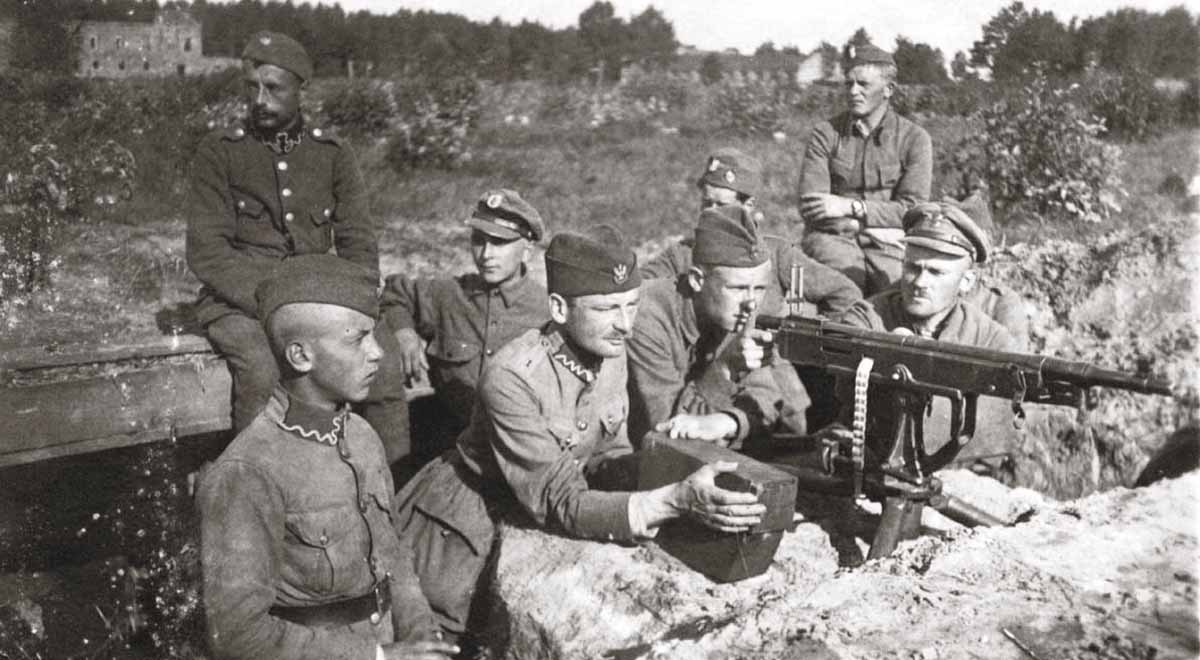
Polish defences at Miłosna, during the decisive Battle of Warsaw, August 1920

In 1918–1919, over 100 workers' councils sprang up on Polish territories; on 5 November 1918, in Lublin, the first Soviet of Delegates was established. On 6 November, socialists proclaimed the Republic of Tarnobrzeg at Tarnobrzeg in the Austrian Galicia. The same day, the Socialist, Ignacy Daszyński, set up a Provisional People's Government of the Republic of Poland (Tymczasowy Rząd Ludowy Republiki Polskiej) in Lublin. On Sunday, 10 November at 7 a.m., Józef Piłsudski, newly freed from 16 months in a German prison in Magdeburg, returned by train to Warsaw. Piłsudski, together with Colonel Kazimierz Sosnkowski, was greeted at Warsaw's railway station by Regent Zdzisław Lubomirski and by Colonel Adam Koc. The next day, due to his popularity and support from most political parties, the Regency Council appointed Piłsudski as Commander in Chief of the Polish Armed Forces. On 14 November, the Council dissolved itself and transferred all its authority to Piłsudski as Chief of State (Naczelnik Państwa). After consultation with Piłsudski, Daszyński's government dissolved itself and a new government was formed under Jędrzej Moraczewski. In 1918, the Kingdom of Italy became the first country in Europe to recognise Poland's renewed sovereignty.

Centres of government that formed at that time in Galicia (formerly Austrian-ruled southern Poland) included the National Council of the Principality of Cieszyn (established in November 1918), the Republic of Zakopane and the Polish Liquidation Committee (28 October). Soon afterward, the Polish–Ukrainian War broke out in Lwów (1 November 1918) between forces of the Military Committee of Ukrainians and the Polish irregular units made up of students known as the Lwów Eaglets, who were later supported by the Polish Army (see Battle of Lwów (1918), Battle of Przemyśl (1918)). Meanwhile, in western Poland, another war of national liberation began under the banner of the Greater Poland uprising (1918–1919). In January 1919, Czechoslovak forces attacked Polish units in the area of Trans-Olza (see Polish–Czechoslovak War). Soon afterwards, the Polish–Lithuanian War (ca 1919–1920) began, and, in August 1919, Polish-speaking residents of Upper Silesia initiated a series of three Silesian Uprisings. The most critical military conflict of that period, however, the Polish–Soviet War (1919–1921), ended in a decisive Polish victory.

== Politics and government ==
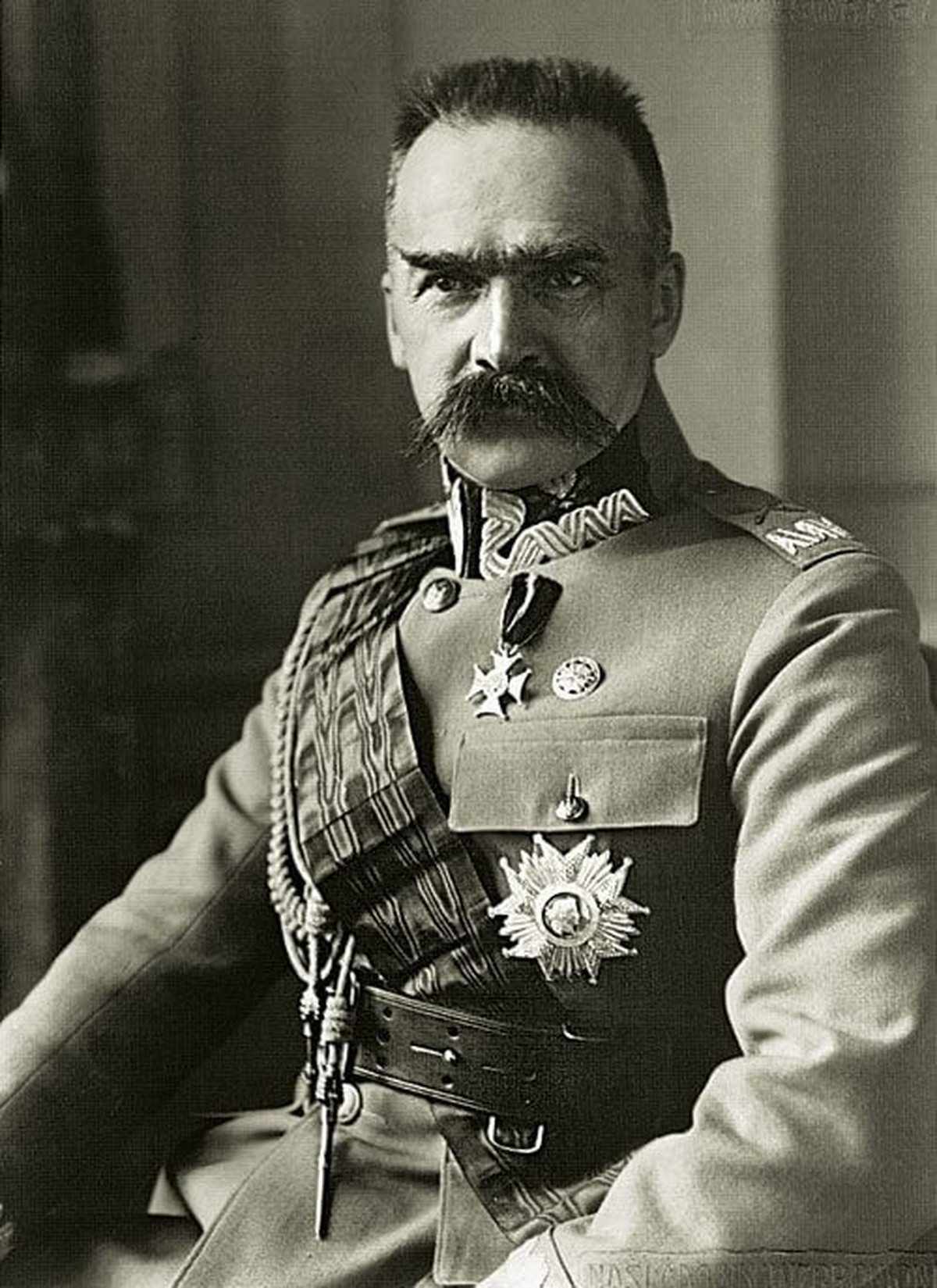
Marshal Józef Piłsudski, Chief of State (Naczelnik Państwa) between November 1918 and December 1922

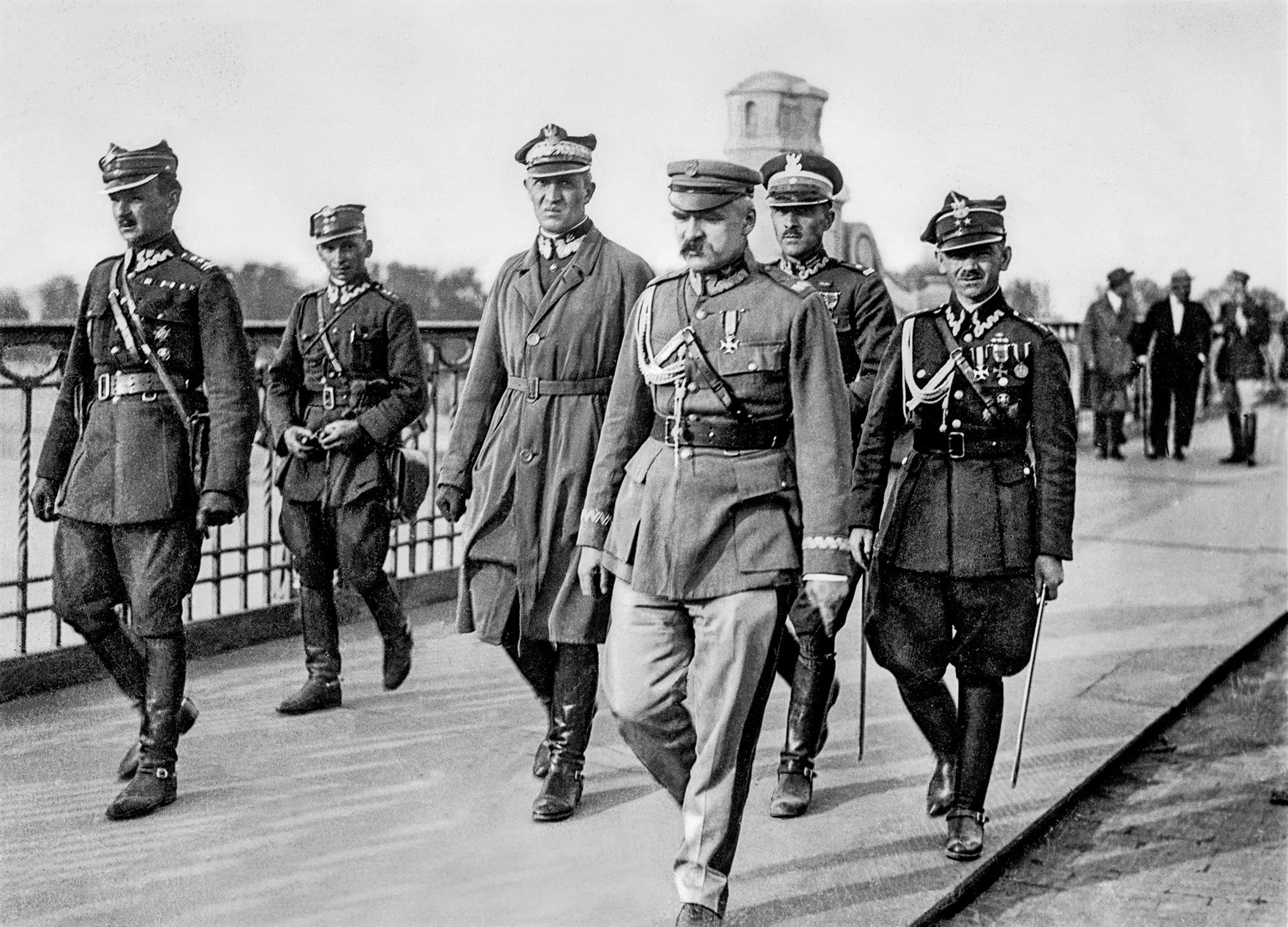
The May Coup d'État (1926)

The Second Polish Republic was a parliamentary democracy from 1919 (see Small Constitution of 1919) to 1926, with the President having limited powers. The Parliament elected him, and he could appoint the Prime Minister as well as the government with the Sejm's (lower house's) approval, but he could only dissolve the Sejm with the Senate's consent. Moreover, his power to pass decrees was limited by the requirement that the Prime Minister and the appropriate other Minister had to verify his decrees with their signatures. Poland was one of the first countries in the world to recognise women's suffrage. Women in Poland were granted the right to vote on 28 November 1918 by a decree of General Józef Piłsudski.

The major political parties at this time were the Polish Socialist Party, National Democrats, various Peasant Parties, Christian Democrats, and political groups of ethnic minorities (German: German Social Democratic Party of Poland, Jewish: General Jewish Labour Bund in Poland, United Jewish Socialist Workers Party, and Ukrainian: Ukrainian National Democratic Alliance). Frequently changing governments (see 1919 Polish legislative election, 1922 Polish legislative election) and other negative publicity the politicians received (such as accusations of corruption or the 1919 Polish coup attempt), made them increasingly unpopular. Major politicians at this time, in addition to General Piłsudski, included peasant activist Wincenty Witos (Prime Minister three times) and right-wing leader Roman Dmowski. Ethnic minorities were represented in the Sejm; e.g. in 1928–1930, there was the Ukrainian-Belarusian Club, with 26 Ukrainian and 4 Belarusian members.

After the Polish–Soviet War, Marshal Piłsudski led an intentionally modest life, writing historical books for a living. After he took power through a military coup in May 1926, he emphasised that he wanted to heal Polish society and politics of excessive partisan politics. His regime, accordingly, was called Sanacja in Polish. The 1928 parliamentary elections were still considered free and fair, although the pro-Piłsudski Nonpartisan Bloc for Cooperation with the Government won them. The following three parliamentary elections (in 1930, 1935 and 1938) were manipulated, with opposition activists sent to Bereza Kartuska prison (see also Brest trials). As a result, the pro-government party Camp of National Unity won huge majorities in them. Piłsudski died just after an authoritarian constitution was approved in the spring of 1935. During the last four years of the Second Polish Republic, the major politicians included President Ignacy Mościcki, Foreign Minister Józef Beck and the Commander-in-Chief of the Polish Army, Marshal Edward Rydz-Śmigły. The country was divided into 104 electoral districts, and those politicians who were forced to leave Poland founded Front Morges in 1936. The government that ruled the Second Polish Republic in its final years is frequently referred to as Piłsudski's colonels.

Presidents and Prime ministers (November 1918 – September 1939)

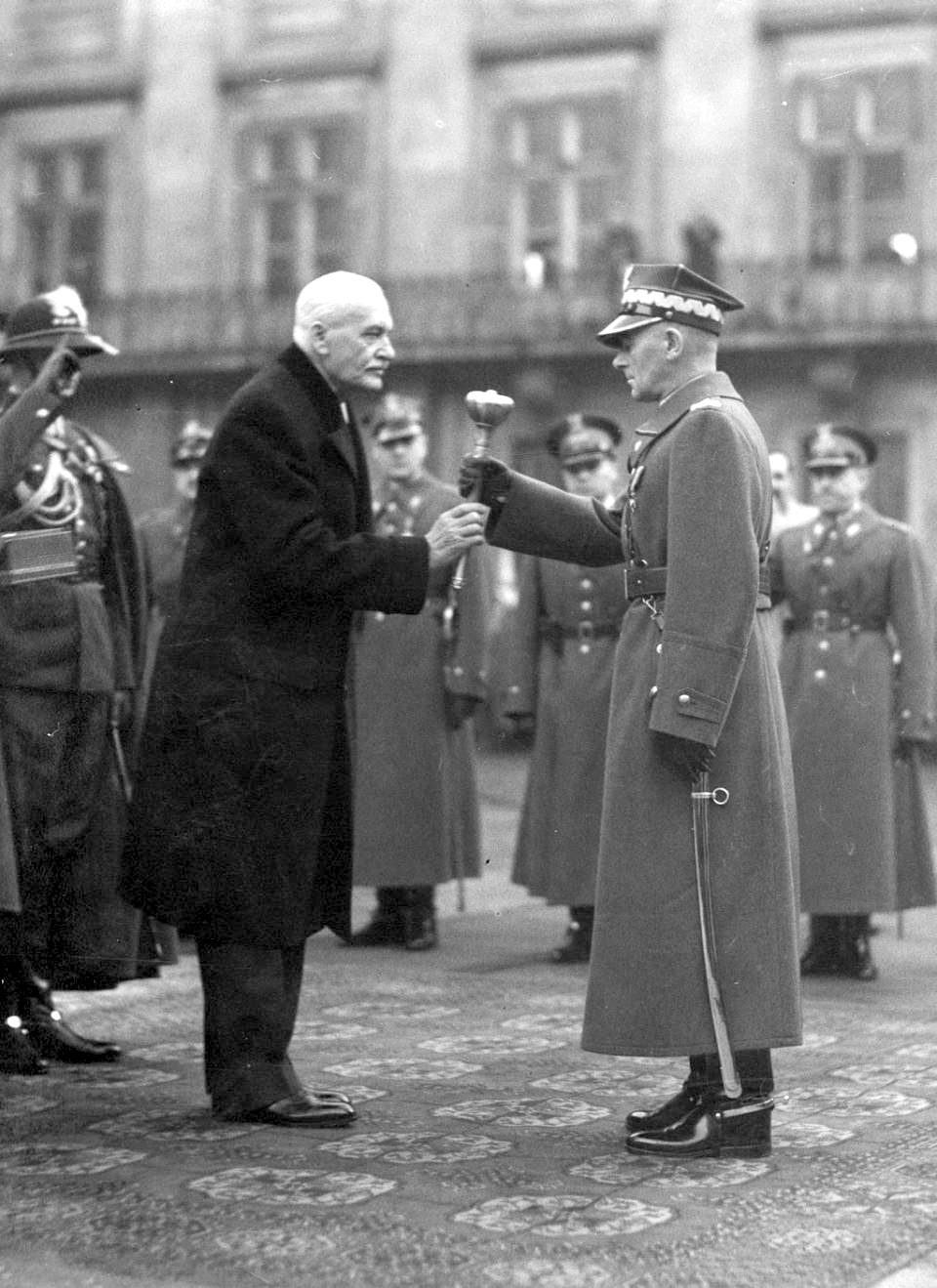
Ignacy Mościcki, President of Poland (left), Warsaw, 10 November 1936, awarding the Marshal's buława to Edward Rydz-Śmigły

=== Chief of State ===
- Józef Piłsudski (22 November 1918 – 9 December 1922)

=== Presidents ===
- Gabriel Narutowicz (9 December 1922 – 16 December 1922)
- Stanisław Wojciechowski: 20 December 1922 – 14 May 1926)
- Ignacy Mościcki – 1 June 1926 – 30 September 1939)
- Bolesław Wieniawa-Długoszowski – 1 October 1939)

=== Prime ministers ===
- Jędrzej Moraczewski (18 November 1918 – 16 January 1919)
- Ignacy Paderewski (18 January 1919 – 27 November 1919)
- Leopold Skulski (13 December 1919 – 9 June 1920)
- Władysław Grabski (27 June 1920 – 24 July 1920)
- Wincenty Witos (24 July 1920 – 13 September 1921)
- Antoni Ponikowski (19 September 1921 – 5 March 1922)
- Antoni Ponikowski (10 March 1922 – 6 June 1922)
- Artur Śliwiński (28 June 1922 – 7 July 1922)
- Wojciech Korfanty (14 July 1922 – 31 July 1922)
- Julian Nowak (31 July 1922 – 14 December 1922)
- Władysław Sikorski (16 December 1922 – 26 May 1923)
- Wincenty Witos (28 May 1923 – 14 December 1923)
- Władysław Grabski (19 December 1923 – 14 November 1925)
- Aleksander Skrzyński (20 November 1925 – 5 May 1926)
- Wincenty Witos (10 May 1926 – 14 May 1926)
- Kazimierz Bartel (15 May 1926 – 4 June 1926)
- Kazimierz Bartel (8 June 1926 – 24 September 1926)
- Kazimierz Bartel (27 September 1926 – 30 September 1926)
- Józef Piłsudski (2 October 1926 – 27 June 1928)
- Kazimierz Bartel (27 June 1928 – 13 April 1929)
- Kazimierz Świtalski (14 April 1929 – 7 December 1929)
- Kazimierz Bartel (29 December 1929 – 15 March 1930)
- Walery Sławek (29 March 1930 – 23 August 1930)
- Józef Piłsudski (25 August 1930 – 4 December 1930)
- Walery Sławek (4 December 1930 – 26 May 1931)
- Aleksander Prystor (27 May 1931 – 9 May 1933)
- Janusz Jędrzejewicz (10 May 1933 – 13 May 1934)
- Leon Kozłowski (15 May 1934 – 28 March 1935)
- Walery Sławek (28 March 1935 – 12 October 1935)
- Marian Zyndram-Kościałkowski (13 October 1935 – 15 May 1936)
- Felicjan Sławoj Składkowski (15 May 1936 – 30 September 1939)

=== Military ===
Poland had military conscription requiring all male citizens upon becoming 21 years old to serve in the military under the 1921 constitution, regardless of one's religious views. Interwar Poland had an army of 270,000 soldiers on active duty: in 37 infantry divisions, 11 cavalry brigades, and two armoured brigades, plus artillery units. Another 700,000 served in the reserves. At the outbreak of the war, the Polish Army was able to put in the field almost one million soldiers, 4,300 guns, around 1,000 armored vehicles including in between 200 and 300 tanks (the majority of the armored vehicles were outclassed tankettes) and 745 aircraft (however, only around 450 of them were bombers and fighters available to fight as of 1 September 1939).

==== Army ====
The training of the Polish Army was thorough. The non-commissioned officers were a competent body of men with expert knowledge and high ideals. The officers, both senior and junior, constantly refreshed their training in the field and in the lecture hall, where modern technical achievements and the lessons of contemporary wars were demonstrated and discussed. The equipment of the Polish Army was less developed technologically than that of Nazi Germany, and its rearmament was slowed by confidence in Western European military support and by budget difficulties. The Polish command system at the level of the entire Polish military and the armies was obsolete. The generals in command of armies had to ask permission from the high command. The Polish military attempted to organise fronts made of army groups only when it was already too late during the Polish Defensive War in 1939.

==== Air Force ====
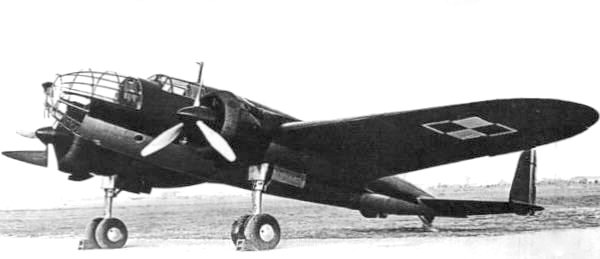
The PZL.37 Łoś was a Polish twin-engine medium bomber.

Poland began building up an air force starting in the Polish-Soviet War. The Polish were not able to sustain this as they did not have a satisfactory amount of airfields along with an industrial base of sorts. Starting in the mid-1930s, modernisation attempts were made, which led to the number of planes in the air force shrinking and in 1936, there were 417 planes. The Polish attempted to acquire planes from the French but were largely unsuccessful. In 1939, Poland had "no more than 511 aircraft".

==== Navy ====
Poland created its own navy upon becoming independent, which mostly consisted of river boats but later diversified. Poland would later include in its navy: torpedo boats, destroyers, submarines and cruisers. By the time of the Second World War in 1939, it had 18 ships in its navy. As naval vessels were prohibited from docking in Gdańsk, the Polish opted to use Gdynia and Hel instead (Hel would be exclusively for military purposes), with Gdynia being where the navy was based out of.

== Economy ==
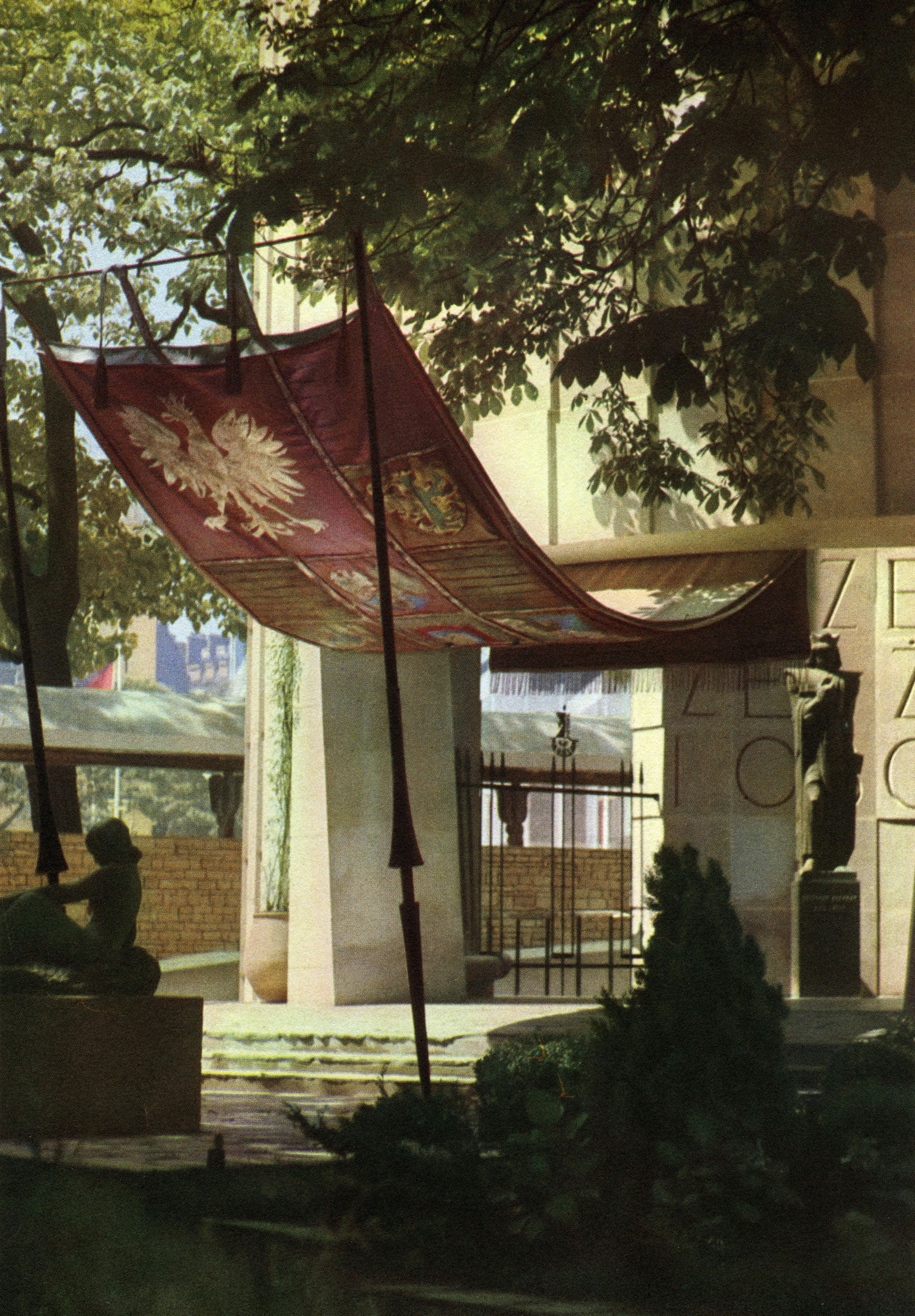
Polish pavilion at Expo 1937 in Paris

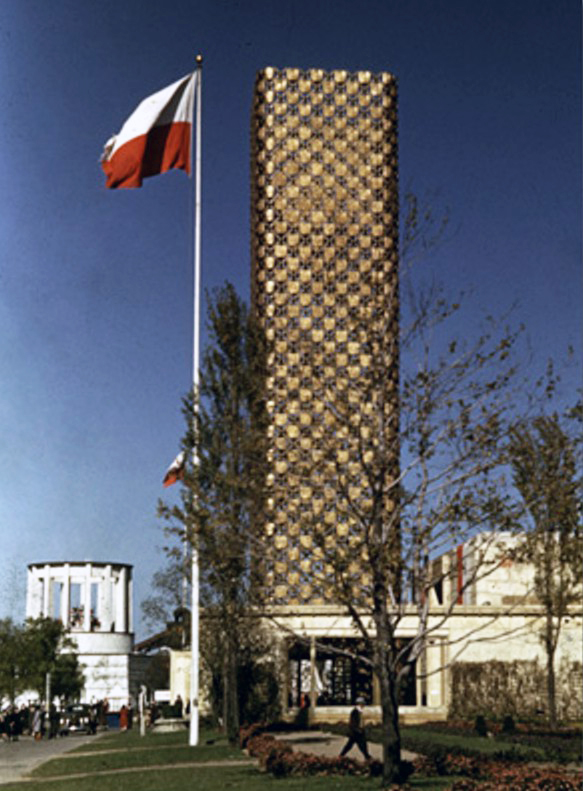
Polish pavilion at the 1939 World's Fair in New York City

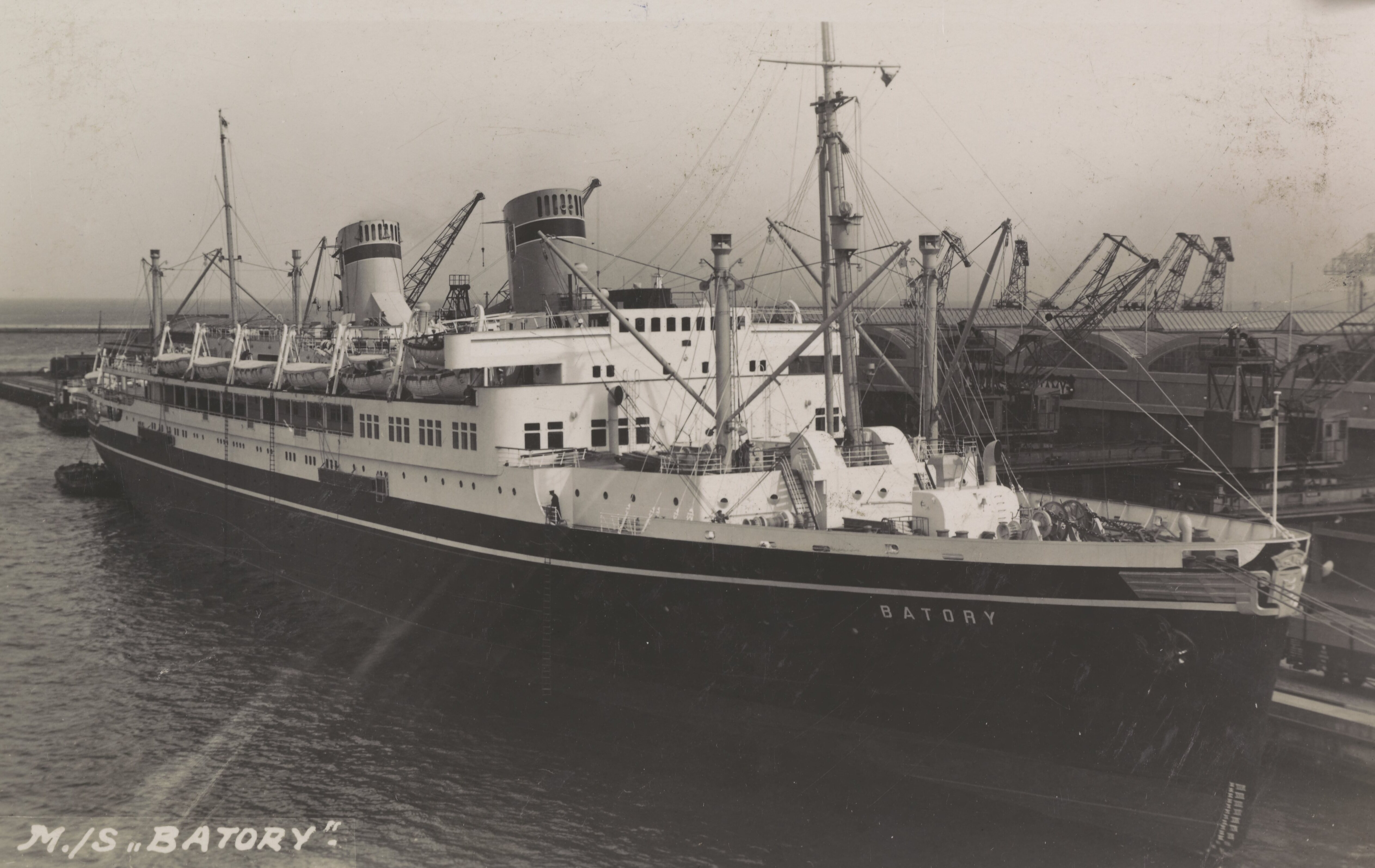
Poland's MS Batory at the sea port of Gdynia, ca 1937–1939

After regaining its independence, Poland was faced with major economic difficulties. In addition to the devastation brought by the First World War, the exploitation of the Polish economy by the German and Russian occupying powers, and the sabotage performed by retreating armies, the new republic was faced with the task of economically unifying disparate economic regions, which had previously been part of different countries and different empires. Within the borders of the Republic were the remnants of three different economic systems, with five different currencies (the German mark, the Imperial Russian rouble, the Austrian krone, the Polish marka and the Ostrubel) and with little or no direct infrastructural links. The situation was so bad that neighbouring industrial centres, as well as major cities, lacked direct railway links because they had been parts of different jurisdictions and different empires. For example, there was no direct railway connection between Warsaw and Kraków until 1934. This situation was described by Melchior Wańkowicz in his book Sztafeta.

In addition to this was the massive destruction left after both the First World War and the Polish–Soviet War. There was also a great economic disparity between the eastern (commonly called Poland B) and western (called Poland A) parts of the country, with the western half, especially areas that had belonged to Prussia and the German Empire, being much more developed and prosperous. Frequent border closures and a customs war with Germany also had negative economic impacts on Poland. In 1924, Prime Minister Władysław Grabski, who was also the Economic Minister, introduced the złoty as a single common currency for Poland (replacing the marka), which remained a stable currency. The currency helped Poland to control the massive hyperinflation. It was the only country in Europe able to do this without foreign loans or aid.

According to a 2010 estimate, the average annual growth rate (GDP per capita) was 5.24% in 1920–1929 and 0.34% in 1929–1938. However, a 2026 study estimated that between 1924 and 1938, real GDP per capita rose by 41%, or 2.5% per year.

GDP per capita
Year	Int$.
1922	1,382
1929	2,117
1930	1,994
1931	1,823
1932	1,658
1933	1,590
1934	1,593
1935	1,597
1936	1,626
1937	1,915
1938	2,182

Hostile relations with neighbours were a major problem for the economy of interbellum Poland. In the year 1937, foreign trade with all neighbours amounted to only 21% of Poland's total. Trade with Germany, Poland's most important neighbour, accounted for 14.3% of Poland's exports. Foreign trade with the Soviet Union (0.8%) was virtually nonexistent. Czechoslovakia accounted for 3.9%, Latvia for 0.3%, and Romania for 0.8%. By mid-1938, after the Anschluss with Austria, Greater Germany was responsible for as much as 23% of Polish foreign trade.

Piłsudski's regime followed the conservative free-market economic tradition of the Polish–Lithuanian Commonwealth throughout its existence. Poland had one of the lowest taxation rates in Europe, with 9.3% of taxes as a proportion of national income. Piłsudski's regime was also heavily dependent on foreign investments and economies, with 45.4% of Polish equity capital controlled by foreign corporations. After the Great Depression, the Polish economy crumbled and failed to recover until Ignacy Mościcki's government introduced economic reforms with more government interventions, with an increase in tax revenues and public spending after Piłsudski's death. These interventionist policies saw Poland's economy recover from the recession.

The basis of Poland's gradual recovery after the Great Depression was the mass economic development plans of the new government (see Four Year Plan) under economist Eugeniusz Kwiatkowski, which oversaw the building of three key infrastructural elements. The first was the establishment of the Gdynia seaport, which allowed Poland to completely bypass Gdańsk (which was under heavy German pressure to boycott Polish coal exports). The second was the construction of the 500 kilometre rail connection between Upper Silesia and Gdynia, called the Polish Coal Trunk-Line, which served freight trains with coal. The third was the creation of a central industrial district named COP – Centralny Okręg Przemysłowy (Central Industrial Region). Unfortunately, these developments were interrupted and largely destroyed by the German and Soviet invasion and the start of the Second World War. Other achievements of interbellum Poland included Stalowa Wola (a brand new city, built in a forest around a steel mill), Mościce (now a district of Tarnów, with a large nitrate factory), and the creation of the central bank Bank Polski SA. There were several trade fairs, with the most popular being Poznań International Fair, Lwów's Targi Wschodnie, and Wilno's Targi Północne. Polish Radio had ten stations (see Radio stations in interwar Poland), with the eleventh one planned to be opened in the autumn of 1939. Furthermore, in 1935, Polish engineers began working on TV services. By early 1939, experts at the Polish Radio built four TV sets. The first movie broadcast by experimental Polish TV was Barbara Radziwiłłówna, and by 1940, a regular TV service was scheduled to begin operation.

Interbellum Poland was also a country with numerous social problems. Unemployment was high, and poverty in the countryside was widespread, which resulted in several cases of social unrest, such as the 1923 Kraków riot, and 1937 peasant strike in Poland. There were conflicts with national minorities, such as the Pacification of Ukrainians in Eastern Galicia (1930), relations with Polish neighbours were sometimes complicated (see Soviet raid on Stołpce, Polish–Czechoslovak border conflicts, and the 1938 Polish ultimatum to Lithuania). On top of this, there were natural disasters, such as the 1934 flood in Poland.

=== Major industrial centres ===
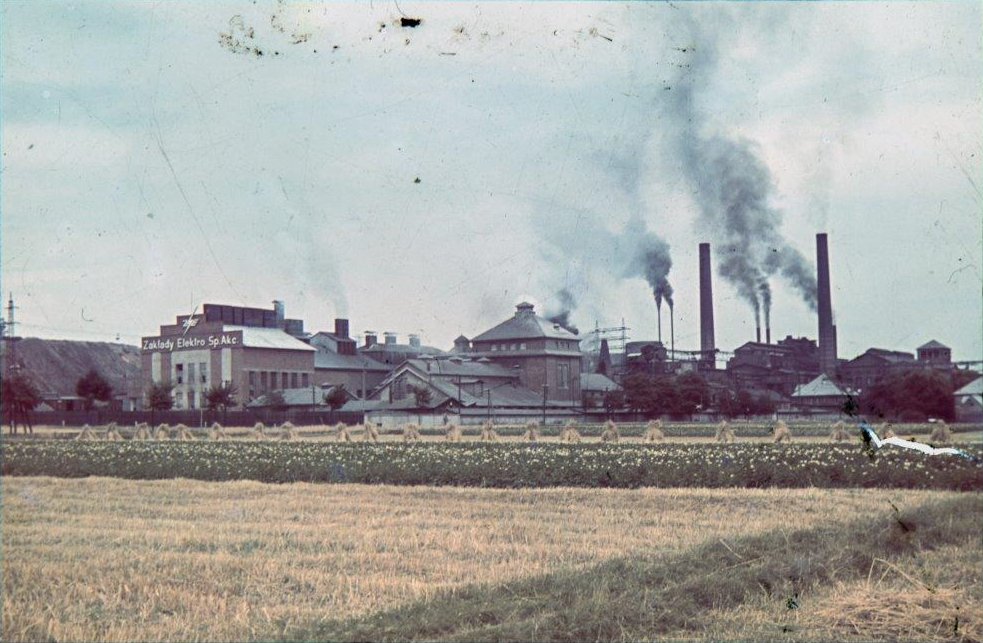
Coal power station in Łaziska Górne, Silesian Voivodeship in 1939. It was the largest Polish power plant in the years 1927–1953 (Agfacolor).

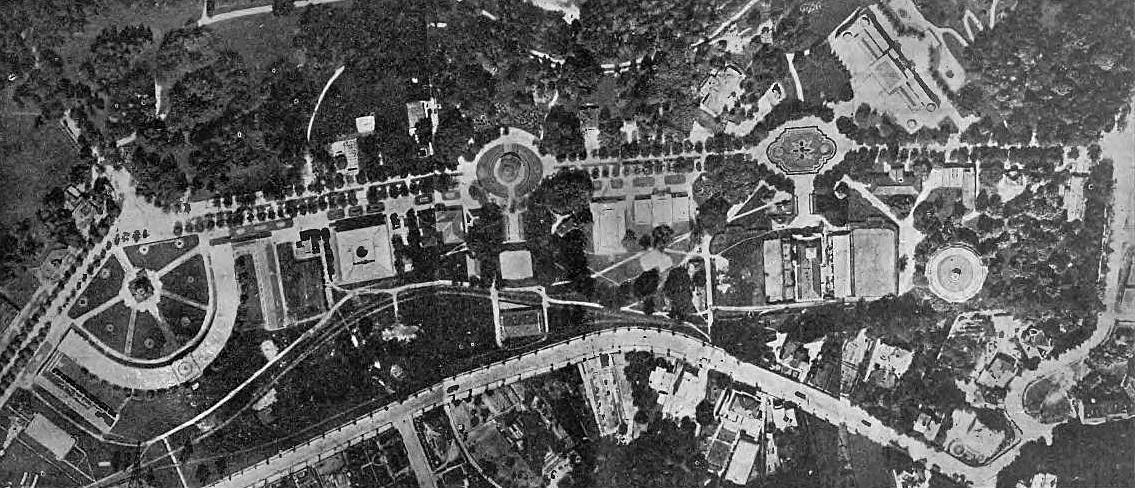
The Eastern Trade Fair in Lwów, 1936

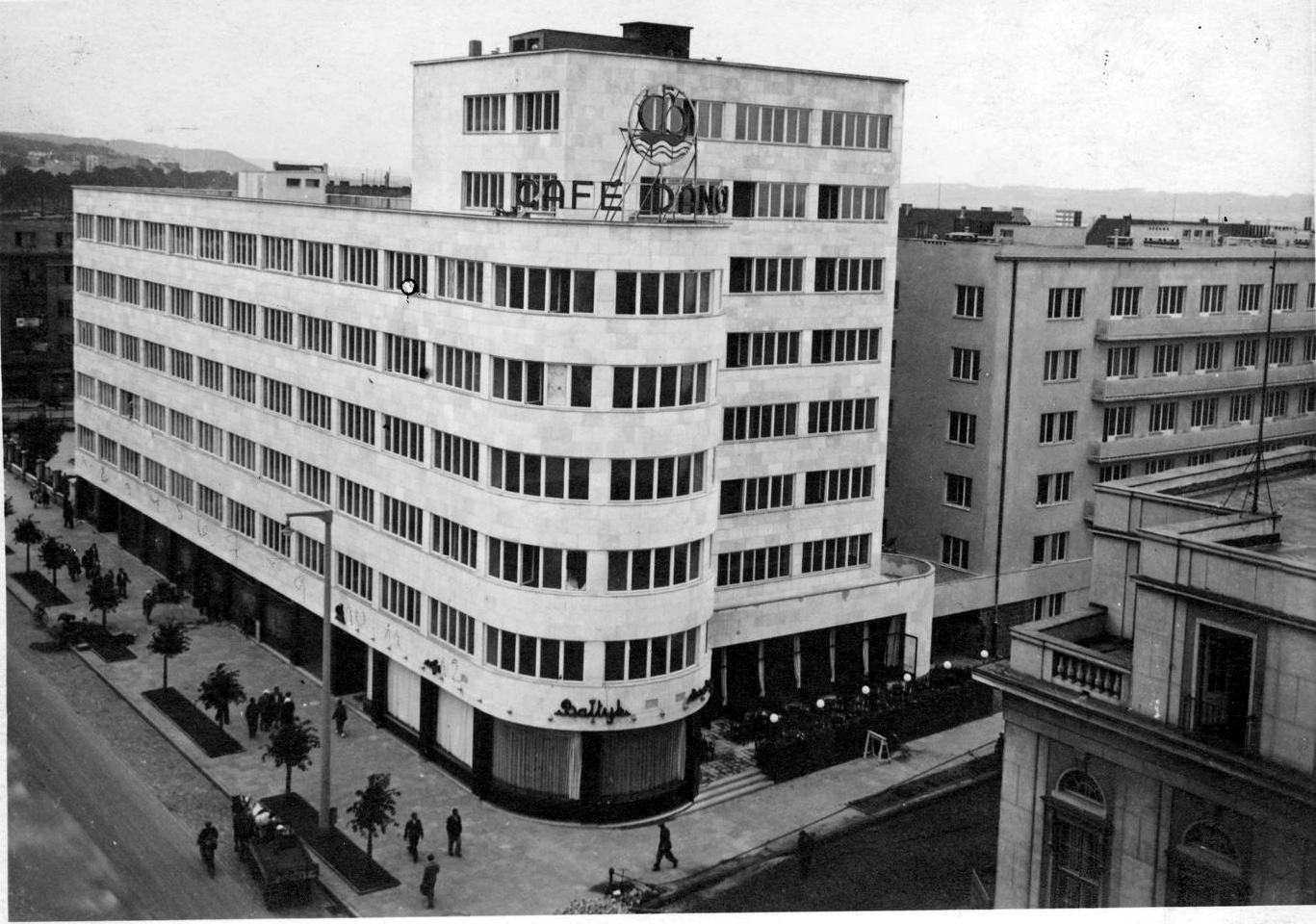
Gdynia, a modern Polish seaport established in 1926

Interbellum Poland was unofficially divided into two parts – better developed "Poland A" in the west, and underdeveloped "Poland B" in the east. Polish industry was concentrated in the west, mostly in Polish Upper Silesia, and the adjacent Lesser Poland's province of Zagłębie Dąbrowskie, where the bulk of coal mines and steel plants were located. Furthermore, heavy industry plants were located in Częstochowa (Huta Częstochowa, founded in 1896), Ostrowiec Świętokrzyski (Huta Ostrowiec, founded in 1837–1839), Stalowa Wola (brand new industrial city, which was built from scratch in 1937–1938), Chrzanów (Fablok, founded in 1919), Jaworzno, Trzebinia (oil refinery, opened in 1895), Łódź (the seat of Polish textile industry), Poznań (H. Cegielski – Poznań), Kraków and Warsaw (Ursus Factory). Further east, in Kresy, industrial centres included two major cities of the region – Lwów and Wilno (Elektrit).

Besides coal mining, Poland also had deposits of oil in Borysław, Drohobycz, Jasło and Gorlice (see Polmin), potassium salt (TESP), and basalt (Janowa Dolina). Apart from already-existing industrial areas, in the mid-1930s an ambitious, state-sponsored project called the Central Industrial Region was started under Minister Eugeniusz Kwiatkowski. One of the characteristic features of the Polish economy in the interbellum was the gradual nationalisation of major plants. This was the case for the Ursus Factory (see Państwowe Zakłady Inżynieryjne) and several steelworks, such as Huta Pokój in Ruda Śląska – Nowy Bytom, Huta Królewska in Chorzów – Królewska Huta, Huta Laura in Siemianowice Śląskie, as well as Scheibler and Grohman Works in Łódź.

=== Transport ===
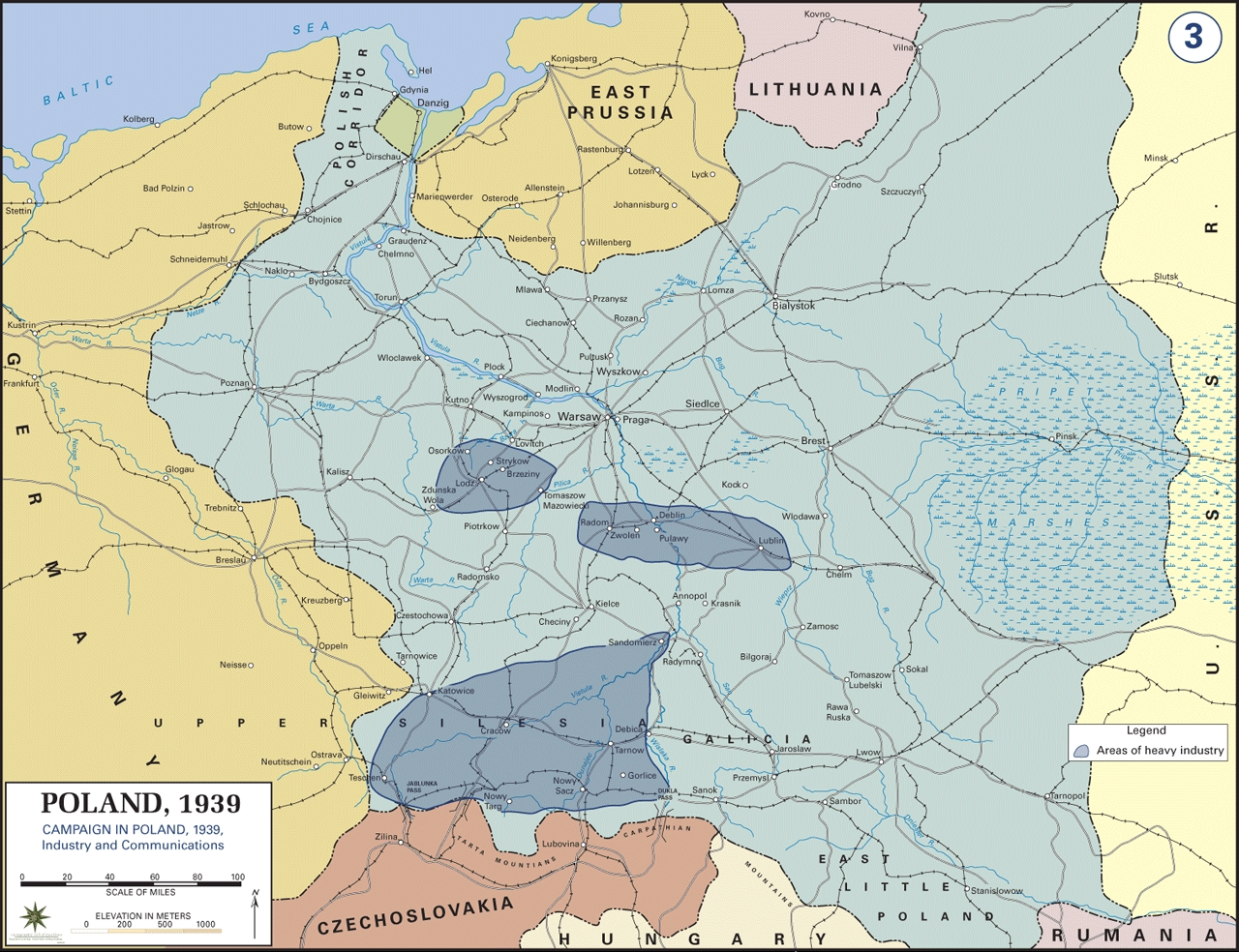
Industry and communications in Poland before the start of the World War II

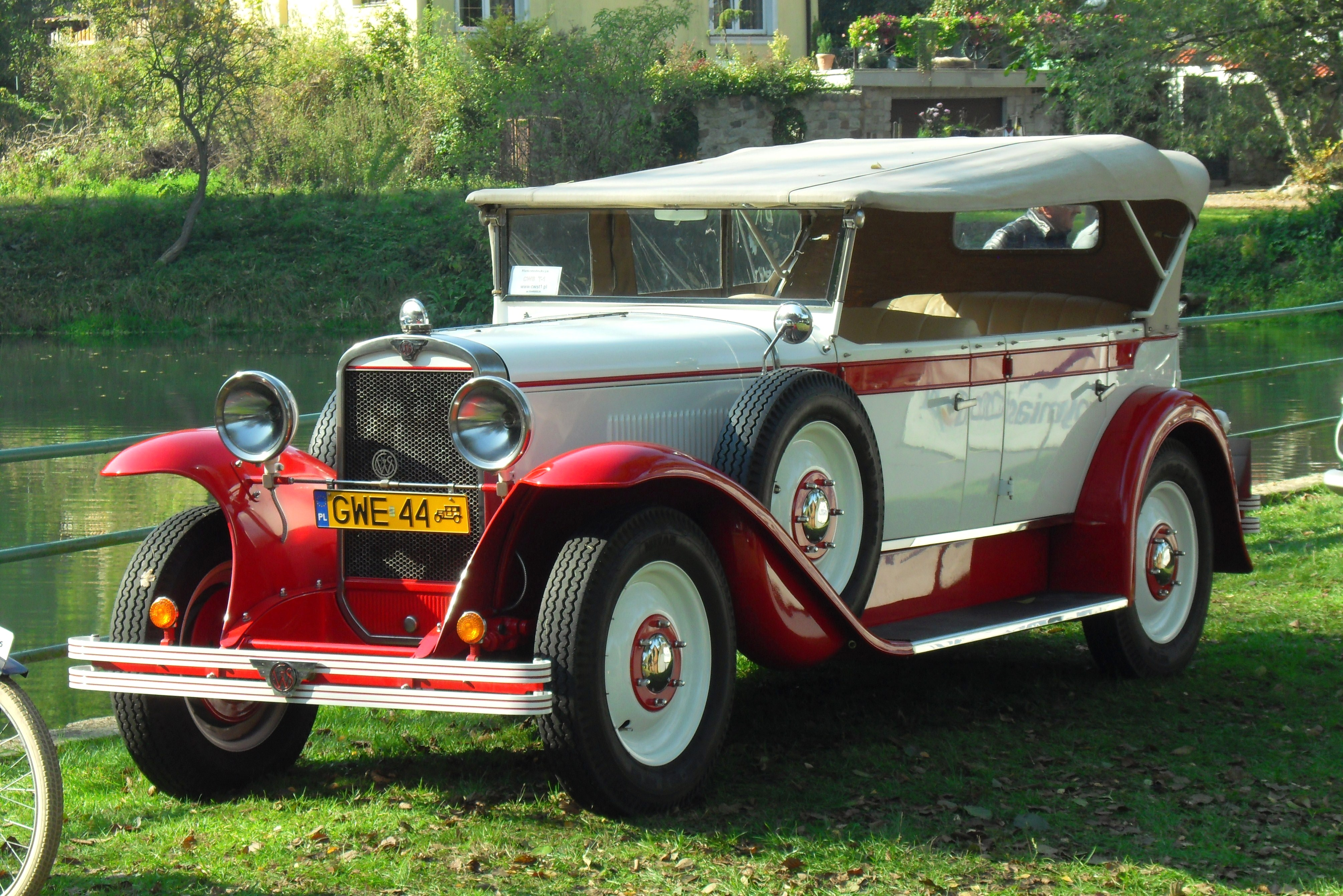
The CWS T-1 Torpedo was the first serially-built car manufactured in Poland.

According to the 1939 Statistical Yearbook of Poland, the total length of the railways in Poland (as of 31 December 1937) was 20,118 km (12,501 mi). Rail density was 5.2 km (3.2 mi) per 100 km^{2} (39 sq mi). Railways were very dense in the western part of the country, while in the east, especially Polesie, rail was non-existent in some counties. During the interbellum period, the Polish Government constructed several new lines, mainly in the central part of the country (see also Polish State Railroads Summer 1939). Construction of the extensive Warszawa Główna railway station was never finished due to the war. Polish railways were famous for their punctuality (see Luxtorpeda, Strzała Bałtyku, Latający Wilnianin).

In the interbellum, the road network of Poland was dense, but the quality of the roads was very poor – only 7% of all roads were paved and ready for automobile use, and none of the major cities was connected with each other by a good-quality highway. In 1939, the Poles built only one highway: 28 km of straight concrete road connecting the villages of Warlubie and Osiek (mid-northern Poland). It was designed by Italian engineer Piero Puricelli.

In the mid-1930s, Poland had 340,000 km (211,266 mi) of roads, but only 58,000 had a hard surface (gravel, cobblestone or sett), and 2,500 were modern, with an asphalt or concrete surface. In different parts of the country, there were sections of paved roads, which suddenly ended, and were followed by dirt roads. The poor condition of the roads was the result of both long-lasting foreign dominance and inadequate funding. On 29 January 1931, the Polish Parliament created the State Road Fund, the purpose of which was to collect money for the construction and conservation of roads. The government drafted a 10-year plan, with road priorities: a highway from Wilno, through Warsaw and Kraków, to Zakopane (called Marshal Piłsudski Highway), asphalt highways from Warsaw to Poznań and Łódź, as well as a Warsaw ring road. However, the plan turned out to be too ambitious, with insufficient money in the national budget to pay for it. In January 1938, the Polish Road Congress estimated that Poland would need to spend three times as much money on roads to keep up with Western Europe.

In 1939, before the outbreak of the war, LOT Polish Airlines, which was established in 1929, had its hub at Warsaw Okęcie Airport. At that time, LOT maintained several services, both domestic and international. Warsaw had regular domestic connections with Gdynia-Rumia, Danzig-Langfuhr, Katowice-Muchowiec, Kraków-Rakowice-Czyżyny, Lwów-Skniłów, Poznań-Ławica, and Wilno-Porubanek. Furthermore, in cooperation with Air France, LARES, Lufthansa, and Malert, international connections were maintained with Athens, Beirut, Berlin, Bucharest, Budapest, Helsinki, Kaunas, London, Paris, Prague, Riga, Rome, Tallinn, and Zagreb.

=== Agriculture ===
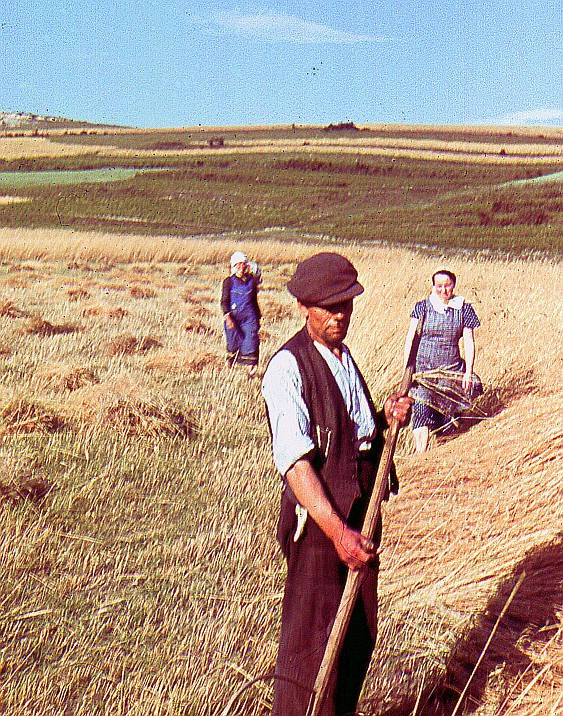
Manual harvesting in Żarki, Lesser Poland Voivodeship in August 1938 (Agfacolor).

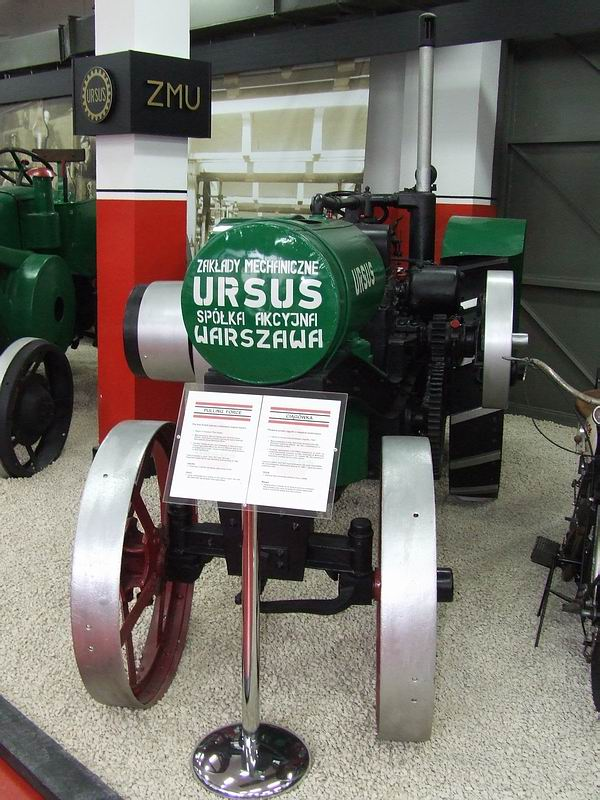
Ciągówka Ursus was the first Polish farm tractor, produced from 1922 to 1927 in the Ursus Factory.

Statistically, the majority of citizens of the Second Polish Republic lived in the countryside (75% in 1921). Farmers made up 65% of the population. In 1929, agricultural production made up 65% of Poland's GNP. After 123 years of partitions, regions of the country were very unevenly developed. The lands of the former German Empire were the most advanced; in Greater Poland, Upper Silesia and Pomerelia, farming and crops were on a Western European level. The situation was much worse in parts of Congress Poland, the Eastern Borderlands, and what was formerly Galicia, where agriculture was quite backward and primitive, with a large number of small farms, unable to succeed in either the domestic or international market. Another problem was the overpopulation of the countryside, which resulted in chronic unemployment. Living conditions were so bad in several eastern regions, such as the counties inhabited by the Hutsul minority, that there was permanent starvation. Farmers rebelled against the government (see: 1937 peasant strike in Poland), and the situation began to change in the late 1930s, due to the construction of several factories for the Central Industrial Region, which gave employment to thousands of rural and small town residents.

=== German trade ===
Beginning in June 1925, there was a customs war, with the revanchist Weimar Republic imposing a trade embargo against Poland for nearly a decade; it involved tariffs and broad economic restrictions. After 1933, the trade war ended. The new agreements regulated and promoted trade. Germany became Poland's largest trading partner, followed by Britain. In October 1938, Germany granted a credit of 60,000,000 RM to Poland (120,000,000 zloty, or £4,800,000), which was never realised, due to the outbreak of war. Germany would deliver factory equipment and machinery in return for Polish timber and agricultural produce. This new trade was to be in addition to the existing German-Polish trade agreements.

== Education and culture ==
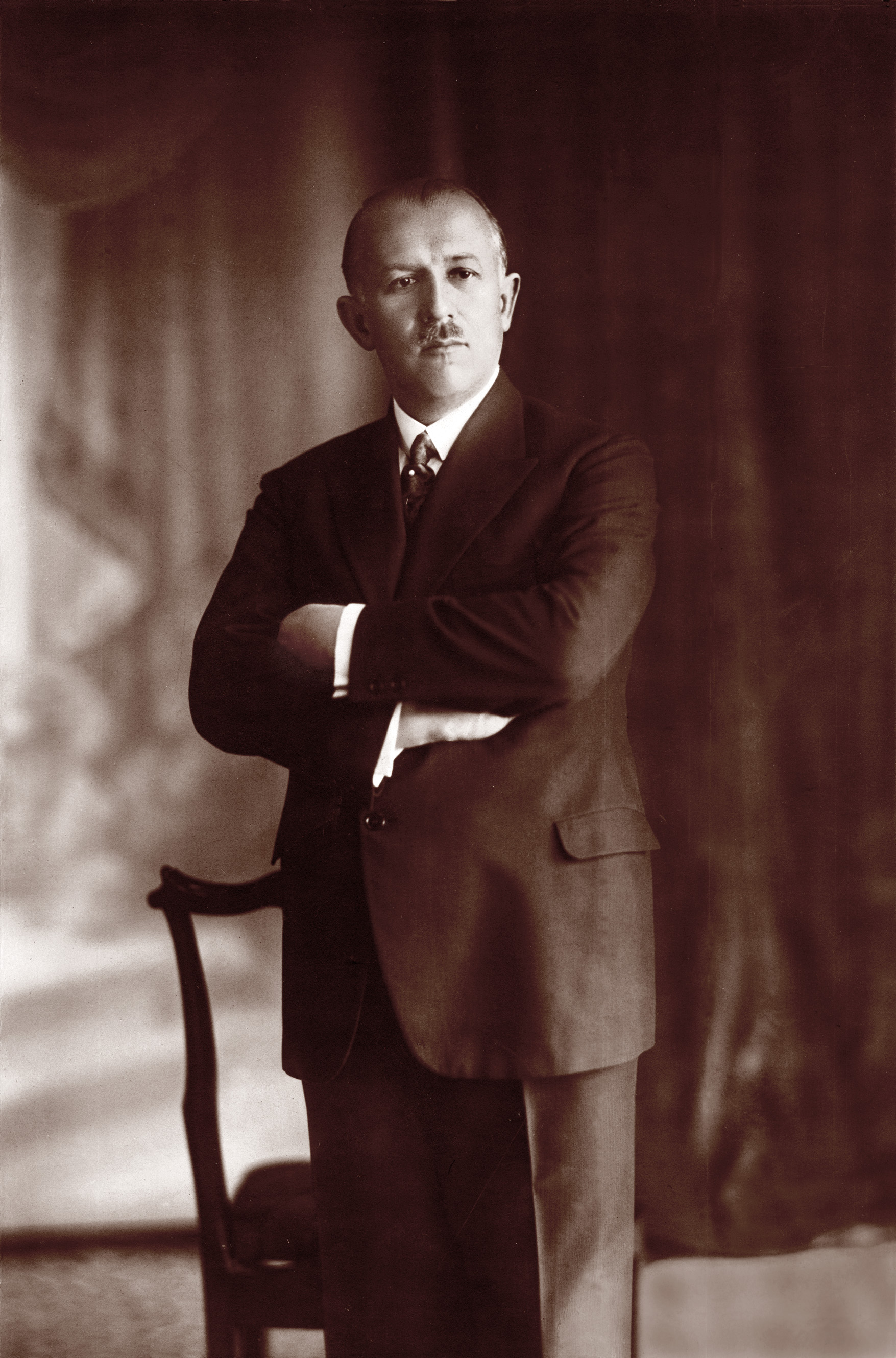
Prime Minister Kazimierz Bartel, also a scholar and mathematician

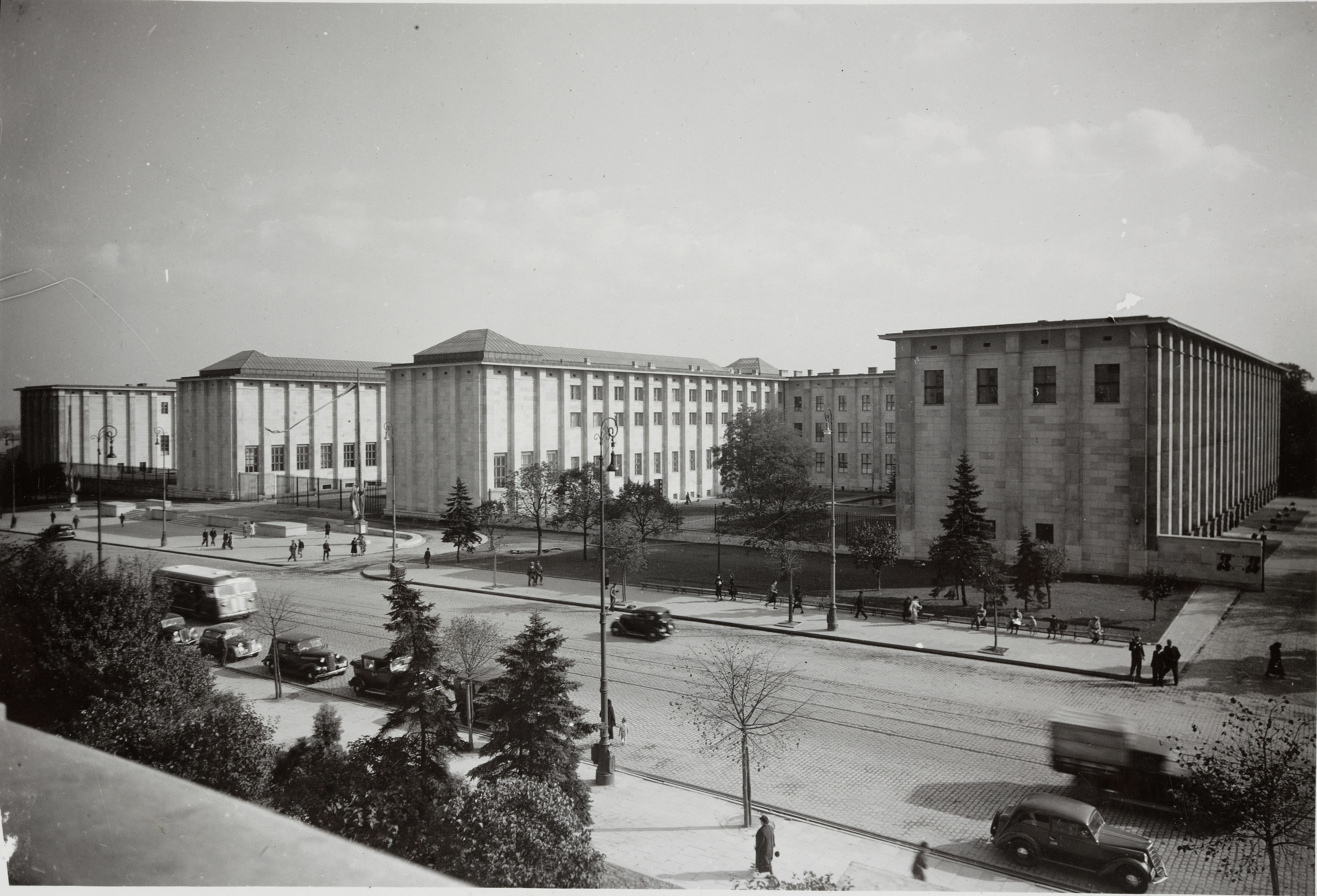
The National Museum in Warsaw (Polish: Muzeum Narodowe w Warszawie) opened in 1938.

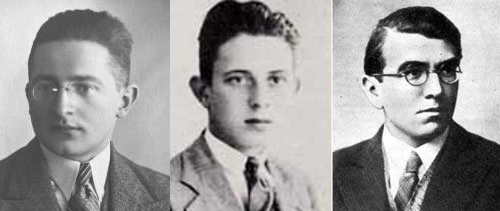
Marian Rejewski, Jerzy Różycki and Henryk Zygalski, Polish mathematicians and cryptologists who worked at breaking the German Enigma ciphers before and during the World War II

In 1919, the Polish government introduced compulsory education for all children aged 7 to 14, in an effort to limit illiteracy, which was widespread, especially in the former Russian Partition and the Austrian Partition of eastern Poland. In 1921, one-third of the citizens of Poland remained illiterate (38% in the countryside). The process was slow, but by 1931 the illiteracy level had dropped to 23% overall (27% in the countryside) and further down to 18% in 1937. By 1939, over 90% of children attended school. In 1932, Janusz Jędrzejewicz, the Minister for Religion and Education, carried out a major reform which introduced two main levels of education: common school (szkoła powszechna), with three levels – 4 grades + 2 grades + 1 grade; and middle school (szkoła średnia), with two levels – 4 grades of comprehensive middle school and 2 grades of specified high school (classical, humanistic, natural and mathematical). A graduate of middle school received a small matura, while a graduate of high school received a big matura, which enabled them to seek university-level education.

Before 1918, Poland had three universities: Jagiellonian University, the University of Warsaw and Lwów University. The Catholic University of Lublin was established in 1918; Adam Mickiewicz University, Poznań, in 1919; and finally, in 1922, after the annexation of the Republic of Central Lithuania, Wilno University became the Republic's sixth university. There were also three technical colleges: the Warsaw University of Technology, Lwów Polytechnic and the AGH University of Science and Technology in Kraków, established in 1919. Warsaw University of Life Sciences was an agricultural institute. By 1939, there were around 50,000 students enrolled in further education. 28% of students at universities were women, which was the second highest share in Europe.

Polish science in the interbellum was renowned for its mathematicians gathered around the Lwów School of Mathematics, the Kraków School of Mathematics, as well as the Warsaw School of Mathematics. There were world-class philosophers in the Lwów–Warsaw school of logic and philosophy. Florian Znaniecki founded Polish sociological studies. Rudolf Weigl invented a vaccine against typhus. Bronisław Malinowski counted among the most important anthropologists of the 20th century.

In Polish literature, the 1920s were marked by the domination of poetry. Polish poets were divided into two groups – the Skamanderites (Jan Lechoń, Julian Tuwim, Antoni Słonimski and Jarosław Iwaszkiewicz) and the Futurists (Anatol Stern, Bruno Jasieński, Aleksander Wat, Julian Przyboś). Apart from well-established novelists (Stefan Żeromski, Władysław Reymont), new names appeared in the interbellum – Zofia Nałkowska, Maria Dąbrowska, Jarosław Iwaszkiewicz, Jan Parandowski, Bruno Schultz, Stanisław Ignacy Witkiewicz, Witold Gombrowicz. Among other notable artists there were sculptor Xawery Dunikowski, painters Julian Fałat, Wojciech Kossak and Jacek Malczewski, composers Karol Szymanowski, Feliks Nowowiejski, and Artur Rubinstein, singer Jan Kiepura.

Theatre was immensely popular in the interbellum, with three main centres in the cities of Warsaw, Wilno and Lwów. Altogether, there were 103 theatres in Poland and a number of other theatrical institutions (including 100 folk theatres). In 1936, different shows were seen by 5 million people, and the main figures of Polish theatre of the time were Juliusz Osterwa, Stefan Jaracz, and Leon Schiller. Also, before the outbreak of the war, there were approximately one million radios (see Radio stations in interwar Poland).

Poland participated in the Olympics for the first time making its debut performance in the 1924 Winter Olympics. A national Olympics committee was formed in 1919 and plans were made to participate in the 1920 Summer Olympics but these were cancelled due to the Polish-Soviet War. Poland participated in every Olympics game between the 1924 Winter Games until its final appearance at the 1936 Summer Olympics. Women also begun to be included more in sports in Poland.

== Administrative divisions ==
The administrative division of the Second Republic was based on a three-tier system, referring to the administrative division of the Polish-Lithuanian Commonwealth. On the lowest rung were the gminy, local town and village governments akin to districts or parishes. These were then grouped together into powiaty (akin to counties), which, in turn, were grouped as województwa (voivodeships, akin to provinces). This administrative system passed into the modern Third Polish Republic.

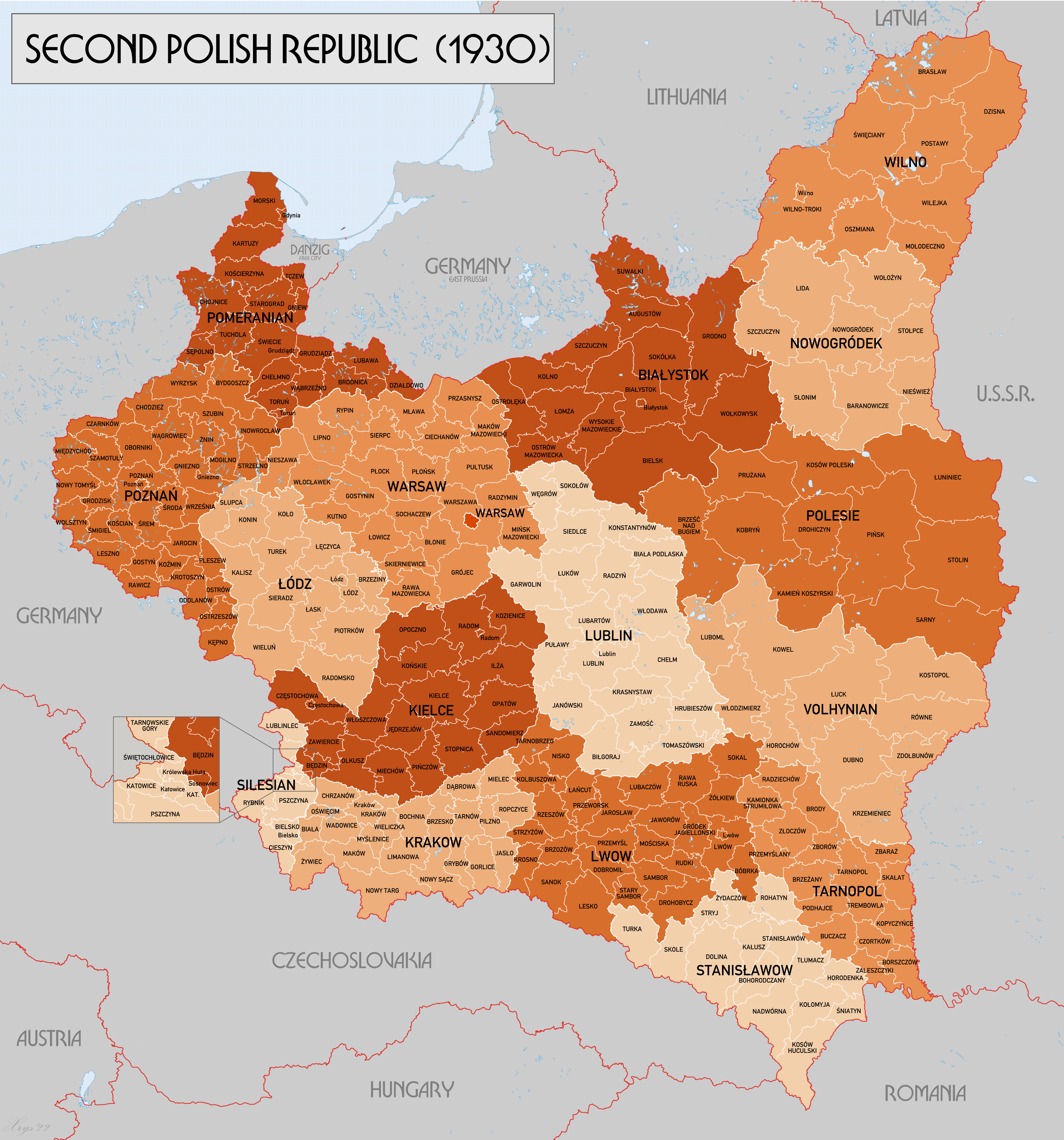
Administrative map of Poland (1930)

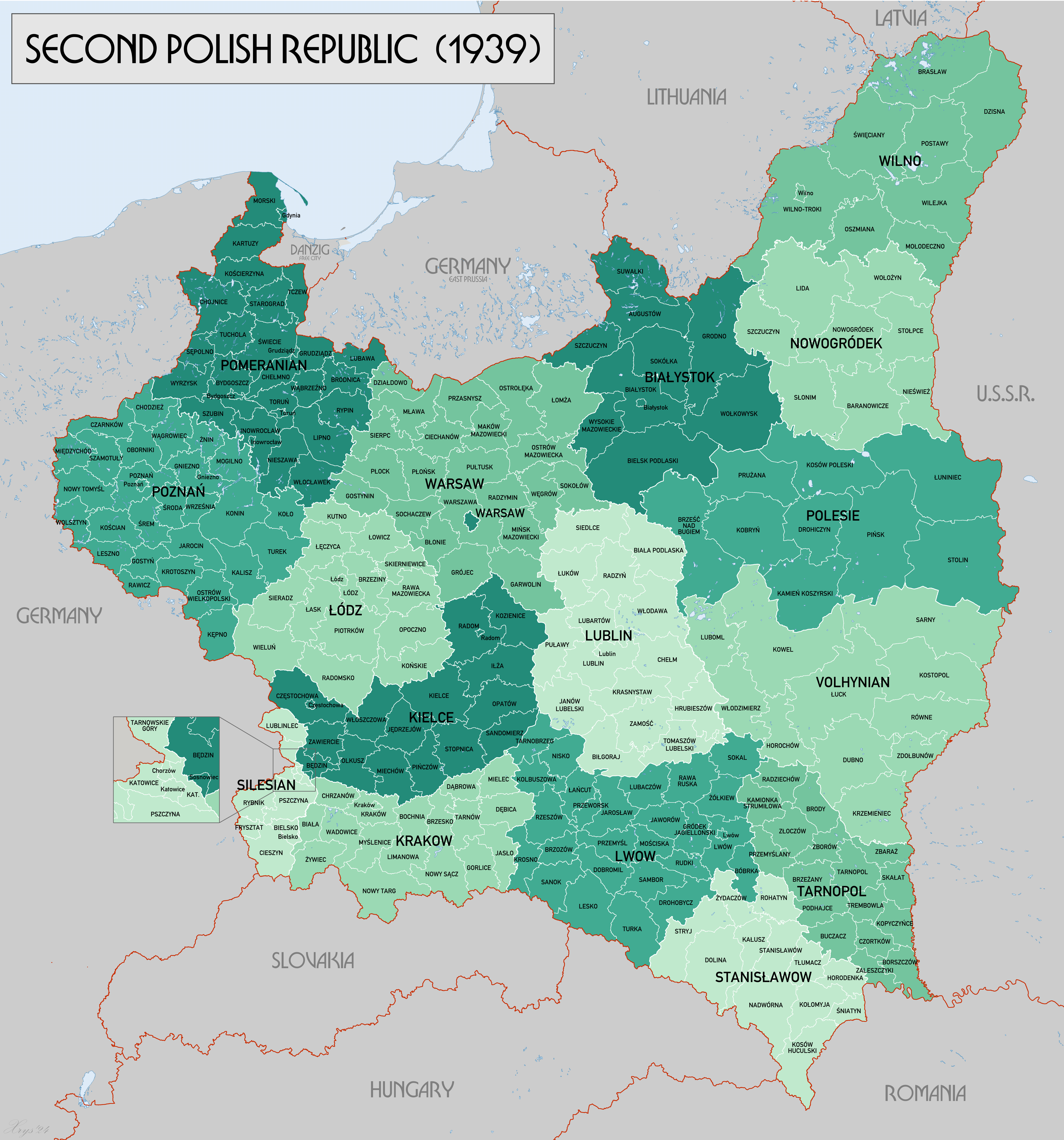
Administrative Map in 1939 showing April 1938 voivodeship revisions, reclaimed Trans-Olza and Slovak border changes

Polish voivodeships (1 April 1937)
Car plates (starting 1937)	Voivodeship or city	Capital	Area (1930) in 1,000s km^{2}	Population (1931) in 1,000s
00–19	City of Warsaw	Warsaw	0.14	1,179.5
85–89	warszawskie	Warsaw	31.7	2,460.9
20–24	białostockie	Białystok	26.0	1,263.3
25–29	kieleckie	Kielce	22.2	2,671.0
30–34	krakowskie	Kraków	17.6	2,300.1
35–39	lubelskie	Lublin	26.6	2,116.2
40–44	lwowskie	Lwów	28.4	3,126.3
45–49	łódzkie	Łódź	20.4	2,650.1
50–54	nowogródzkie	Nowogródek	23.0	1,057.2
55–59	poleskie (Polesia)	Brześć nad Bugiem	36.7	1,132.2
60–64	pomorskie (Pomeranian)	Toruń	25.7	1,884.4
65–69	poznańskie	Poznań	28.1	2,339.6
70–74	stanisławowskie	Stanisławów	16.9	1,480.3
75–79	śląskie (Silesian)	Katowice	5.1	1,533.5
80–84	tarnopolskie	Tarnopol	16.5	1,600.4
90–94	wileńskie	Wilno	29.0	1,276.0
95–99	wołyńskie (Volhynian)	Łuck	35.7	2,085.6
The borders of several western and central voivodeships were revised on 1 April 1938

== Demographics ==
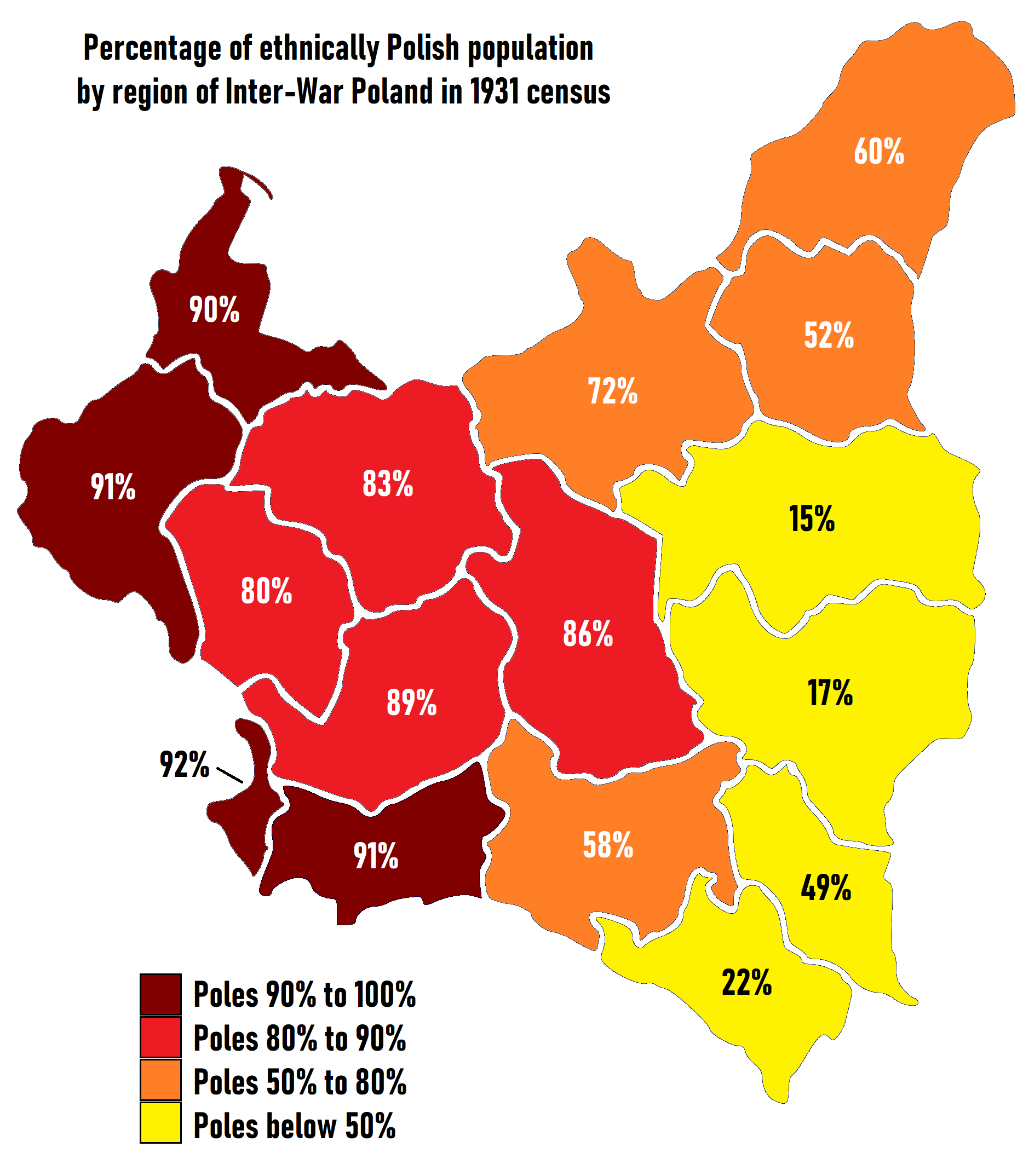
Percent of ethnic Poles by voivodeship according to the 1931 census

Historically, Poland was almost always a multiethnic country. This was especially true for the Second Republic, when independence was once again achieved in the wake of World War I and the subsequent Polish–Soviet War, the latter war being officially ended by the Peace of Riga. The census of 1921 shows 30.8% of the population consisted of ethnic minorities, compared with a share of 1.6% (solely identifying with a non-Polish ethnic group) or 3.8% (including those identifying with both the Polish ethnicity and with another ethnic group) in 2011. The first spontaneous flight of about 500,000 Poles from the Soviet Union occurred during the reconstitution of sovereign Poland. In the second wave, between November 1919 and June 1924, some 1,200,000 people left the territory of the USSR for Poland. It is estimated that some 460,000 of them spoke Polish as their first language. According to the 1931 Polish Census: 69% of the population was Polish, 14% were Ukrainian, around 10% Jewish, 3% Belarusian, 2% German and 3% other, including Lithuanian, Czech, Armenian, Russian, and Romani. The situation of minorities was a complex subject and changed during the period.

Poland was also a nation of many religions. In 1921, 16,057,229 Poles (approx. 62.5%) were Roman (Latin) Catholics, 3,031,057 citizens of Poland (approx. 11.8%) were Eastern Rite Catholics (mostly Ukrainian Greek Catholics and Armenian Rite Catholics), 2,815,817 (approx. 10.95%) were Orthodox, 2,771,949 (approx. 10.8%) were Jewish, and 940,232 (approx. 3.7%) were Protestants (mostly Lutheran).

By 1931, Poland had the second largest Jewish population in the world, with one-fifth of all the world's Jews residing within its borders (approx. 3,136,000). The urban population of interbellum Poland was rising steadily; in 1921, only 24% of Poles lived in the cities, and in the late 1930s, that proportion grew to 30%. In more than a decade, the population of Warsaw grew by 200,000, Łódź by 150,000, and Poznań by 100,000. This was due not only to internal migration but also to an extremely high birth rate.

=== Largest cities in the Second Polish Republic ===
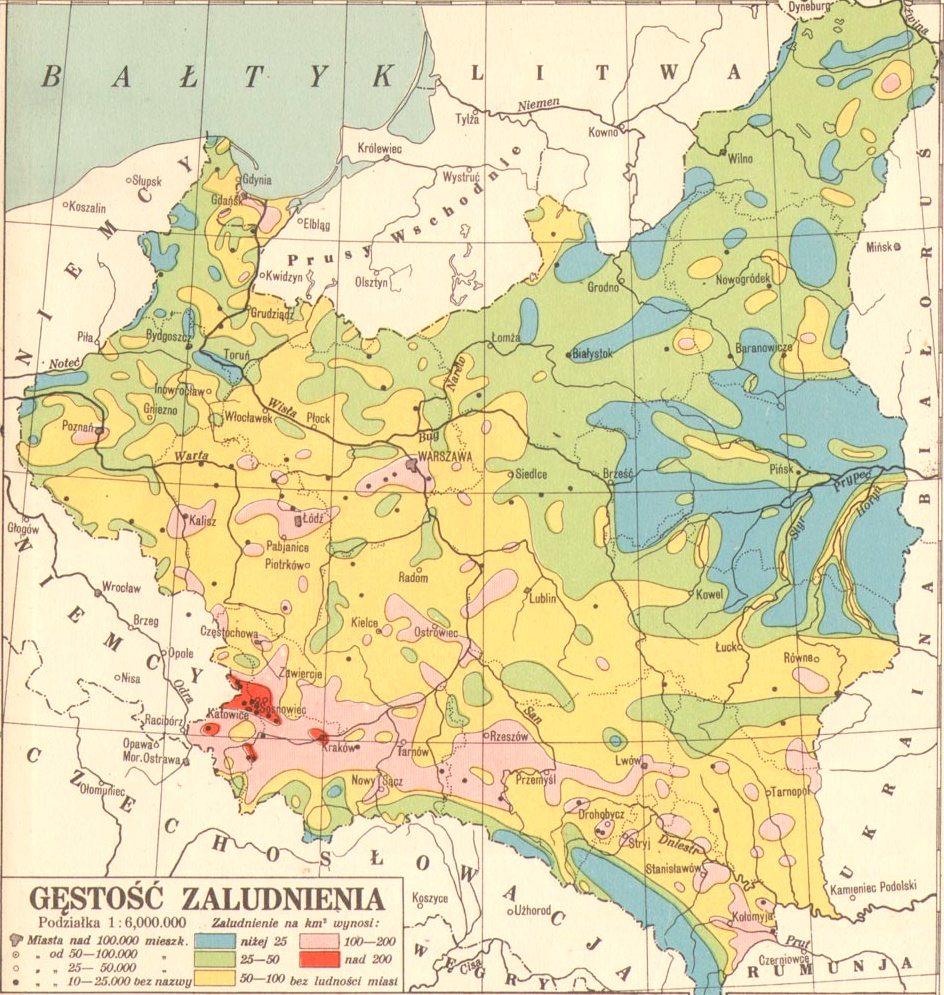
Poland's population density in 1930

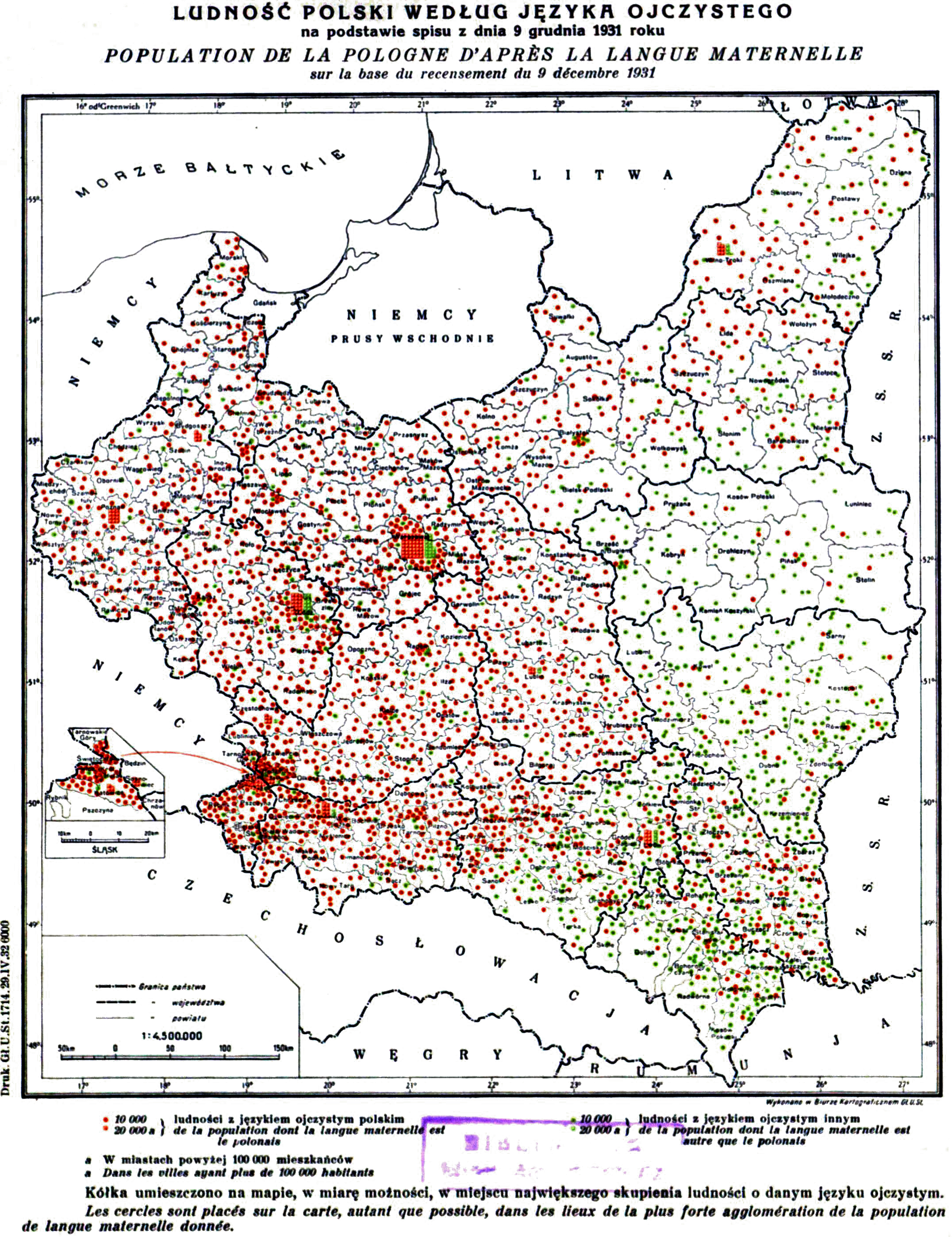
Contemporary map showing language frequency in 1931 across Poland; red: more than 50% native Polish speakers; green: more than 50% native language other than Polish, including Yiddish, Hebrew, Ukrainian, Belarusian, Russian and less frequent others

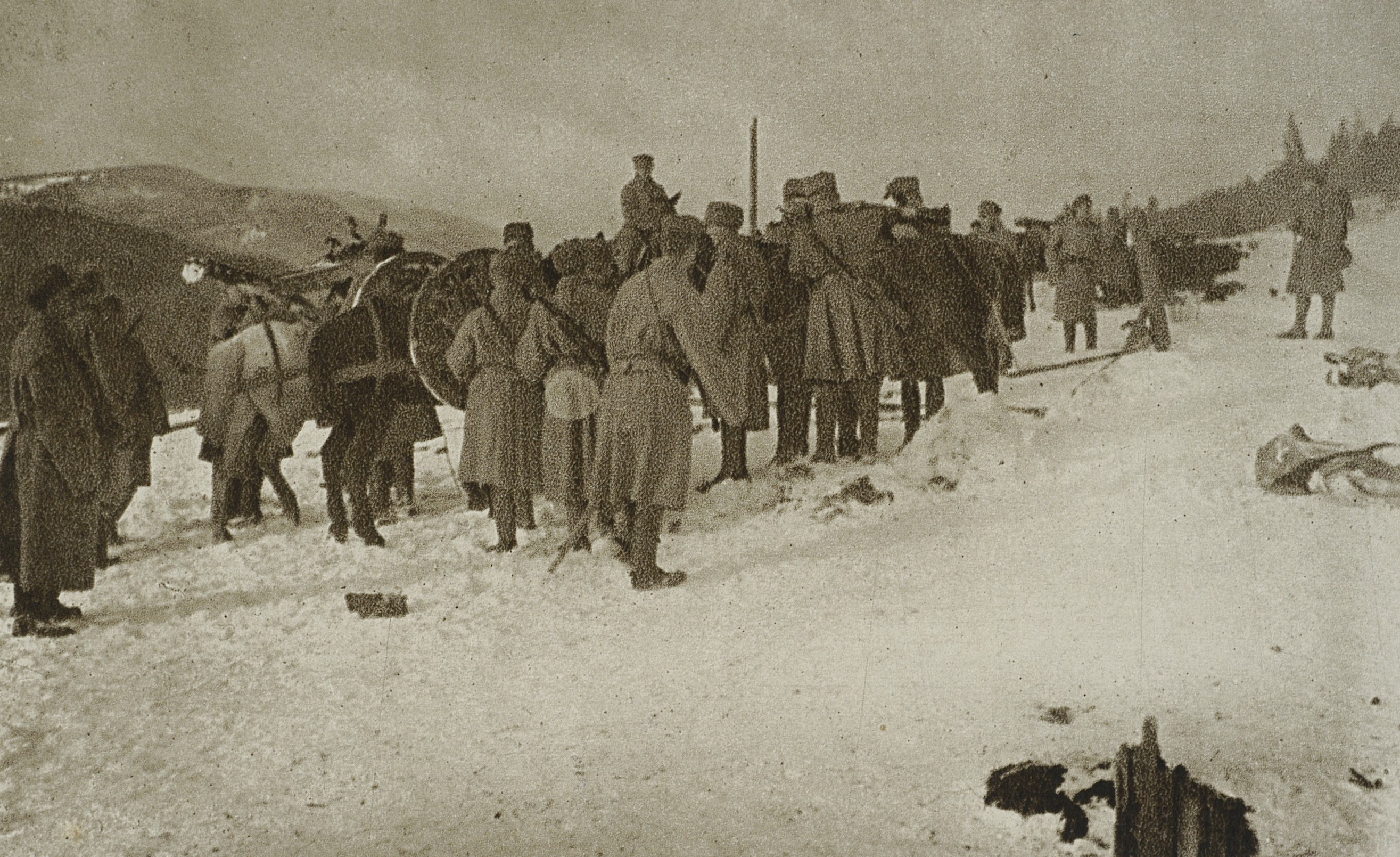
Officers from the Second Mountain Brigade of the Polish Legions in the First World War establishing the Polish-Czechoslovak border; they are pictured near the summit of Popadia in Gorgany during the formation of the Second Republic, 1915.

	City	Population	Voivodeship
1	Warsaw	1,289,000	Warsaw Voivodeship
2	Łódź	672,000	Łódź Voivodeship
3	Lwów	318,000	Lwów Voivodeship
4	Poznań	272,000	Poznań Voivodeship
5	Kraków	259,000	Kraków Voivodeship
6	Wilno	209,000	Wilno Voivodeship
7	Bydgoszcz	141,000	Poznań Voivodeship later Pomeranian Voivodeship
8	Częstochowa	138,000	Kielce Voivodeship
9	Katowice	134,000	Silesian Voivodeship
10	Sosnowiec	130,000	Kielce Voivodeship
11	Chorzów	128,000	Silesian Voivodeship
12	Lublin	122,000	Lublin Voivodeship
13	Gdynia	120,000	Pomeranian Voivodeship
14	Białystok	107,000	Białystok Voivodeship
15	Kalisz	81,000	Łódź Voivodeship
16	Radom	78,000	Kielce Voivodeship
17	Toruń	62,000	Pomeranian Voivodeship
18	Stanisławów	60,000	Stanisławów Voivodeship
19	Tarnów	59,000	Kraków Voivodeship
20	Kielce	58,000	Kielce Voivodeship
21	Grodno	57,000	Białystok Voivodeship
22	Włocławek	56,000	Pomeranian Voivodeship
23	Grudziądz	54,000	Pomeranian Voivodeship
24	Brześć nad Bugiem	51,000	Polesie Voivodeship
25	Piotrków Trybunalski	51,000	Łódź Voivodeship
26	Przemyśl	51,000	Lwów Voivodeship

=== Prewar population density ===
Date	Population	Percentage of rural population	Population density (per km^{2})	Ethnic minorities (total)
30 September 1921 (census)	27,177,000	75.4%	69.9	30.77%
9 December 1931 (census)	32,348,000	72.6%	82.6	31.09%
31 December 1938 (estimate)	34,849,000	70.0%	89.7	Upward trend in immigration

== Status of ethnic minorities ==
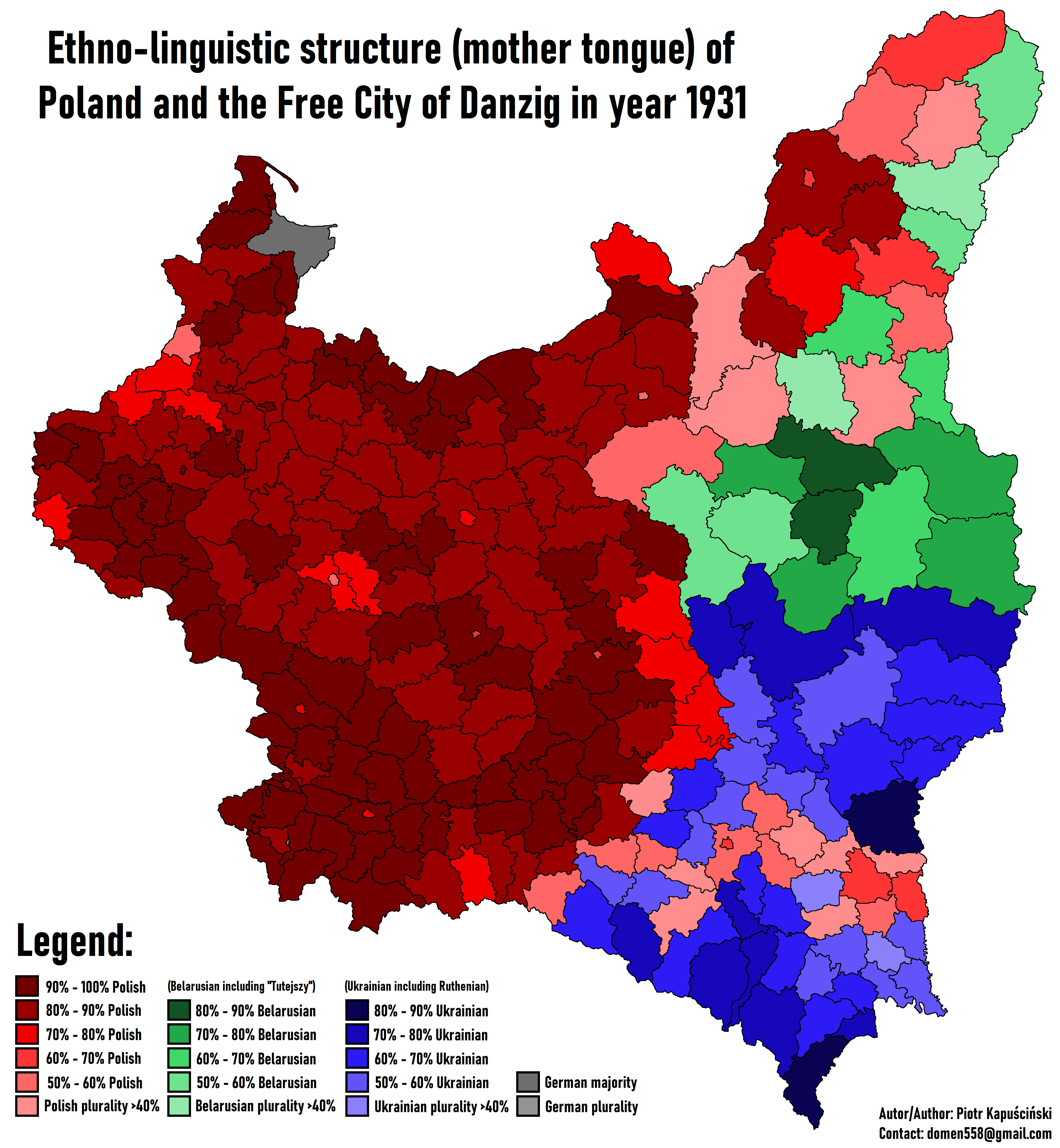
Majority language (mother tongue) in Poland in 1931 by county... Polish... Belarusian... Ukrainian German

=== Jews ===
From the 1920s, the Polish government excluded Jews from receiving government bank loans, public sector employment, and obtaining business licenses. From the 1930s, measures were taken against Jewish shops, Jewish export firms, Shechita as well as limitations being placed on Jewish admission to the medical and legal professions, Jews in business associations and the enrollment of Jews into universities. The political movement National Democracy (Endecja, from the abbreviation "ND") often organised anti-Jewish business boycotts. Following the death of Marshal Józef Piłsudski in 1935, the Endecja intensified their efforts, which triggered violence in extreme cases in smaller towns across the country. In 1937, the National Democracy movement passed resolutions that "its main aim and duty must be to remove the Jews from all spheres of social, economic, and cultural life in Poland". The government in response organised the Camp of National Unity (OZON), which in 1938 took control of the Sejm and subsequently drafted anti-Semitic legislation similar to the Anti-Jewish laws in Germany, Hungary, and Romania. OZON advocated mass emigration of Jews from Poland, numerus clausus (see also Ghetto benches), and other limitations on Jewish rights. According to William W. Hagen, by 1939, prior to the war, Polish Jews were threatened with conditions similar to those in Nazi Germany.

=== Ukrainians ===
In Galicia, unlike in Volhynia, the government was less amenable to integrating the Ukrainian minority. Opposition to the Polish state and resistance to integration by Ukrainian nationalists were also stronger. The pre-war government restricted the rights of people who declared Ukrainian nationality, belonged to the Eastern Orthodox Church and inhabited the Eastern Borderlands of the Second Polish Republic. Poland refused to grant the Ukrainian minority a territorial autonomy. Ukrainian was restricted in every field possible, especially in governmental institutions, and the term "Ruthenian" was enforced in an attempt to ban the use of the term "Ukrainian". Ukrainians were categorised as uneducated second-class peasants or third world people, and rarely settled outside the Eastern Borderland region due to the prevailing Ukrainophobia and restrictions imposed. Numerous attempts at restoring the Ukrainian state were suppressed and any existent violence or terrorism initiated by the Organisation of Ukrainian Nationalists was emphasised to create the image of a "brutal Eastern savage". After 1935, Polish policy towards Ukrainians shifted its focus from state consolidation to the ethnic assimilation of part of the Ukrainian population through polonisation and conversion to Roman Catholicism.

== Geography ==
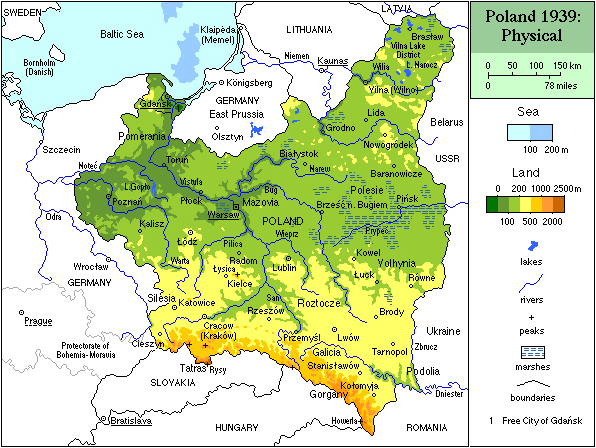
Physical map of the Second Polish Republic

The Second Polish Republic was mainly flat with an average elevation of 233 m (764 ft) above sea level, except for the southernmost Carpathian Mountains (after the Second World War and its border changes, the average elevation of Poland decreased to 173 m (568 ft)). Only 13% of the territory, along the southern border, was higher than 300 m (980 ft). The highest elevation in the country was Mount Rysy, which rises 2,499 m (8,199 ft) in the Tatra Range of the Carpathians, approximately 95 km (59 mi) south of Kraków. Between October 1938 and September 1939, the highest elevation was Lodowy Szczyt (known in Slovak as Ľadový štít), which rises 2,627 m (8,619 ft) above sea level. The largest lake was Lake Narach.

The country's total area, after the annexation of Trans-Olza, was 389,720 km^{2} (150,470 sq mi). It extended 903 km (561 mi) from north to south and 894 km (556 mi) from east to west. On 1 January 1938, total length of boundaries was 5,529 km (3,436 mi), including: 140 km (87 mi) of coastline (out of which 71 km (44 mi) were made by the Hel Peninsula), the 1,412 km (877 mi) with Soviet Union, 948 kilometers with Czechoslovakia (until 1938), 1,912 km (1,188 mi) with Germany (together with East Prussia), and 1,081 km (672 mi) with other countries (Lithuania, Romania, Latvia, Danzig). The warmest yearly average temperature was in Kraków among major cities of the Second Polish Republic, at 9.1 °C (48.4 °F) in 1938; and the coldest in Wilno (7.6 °C or 45.7 °F in 1938). Extreme geographical points of Poland included Przeświata River in Somino to the north (located in the Braslaw county of the Wilno Voivodeship); Manczin River to the south (located in the Kosów county of the Stanisławów Voivodeship); Spasibiorki near railway to Połock to the east (located in the Dzisna county of the Wilno Voivodeship); and Mukocinek near Warta River and Meszyn Lake to the west (located in the Międzychód county of the Poznań Voivodeship).

=== Waters ===
Almost 75% of the territory of interbellum Poland was drained northward into the Baltic Sea by the Vistula (total area of drainage basin of the Vistula within boundaries of the Second Polish Republic was 180,300 km^{2} (69,600 sq mi), the Niemen (51,600 km^{2} or 19,900 sq mi), the Oder (46,700 km^{2} or 18,000 sq mi) and the Daugava (10,400 km^{2} or 4,000 sq mi). The remaining part of the country was drained southward, into the Black Sea, by the rivers that drain into the Dnieper (Pripyat, Horyn and Styr, all together 61,500 km^{2} or 23,700 sq mi) as well as Dniester (41,400 km^{2} or 16,000 sq mi)

== Invasion of Poland in 1939 ==
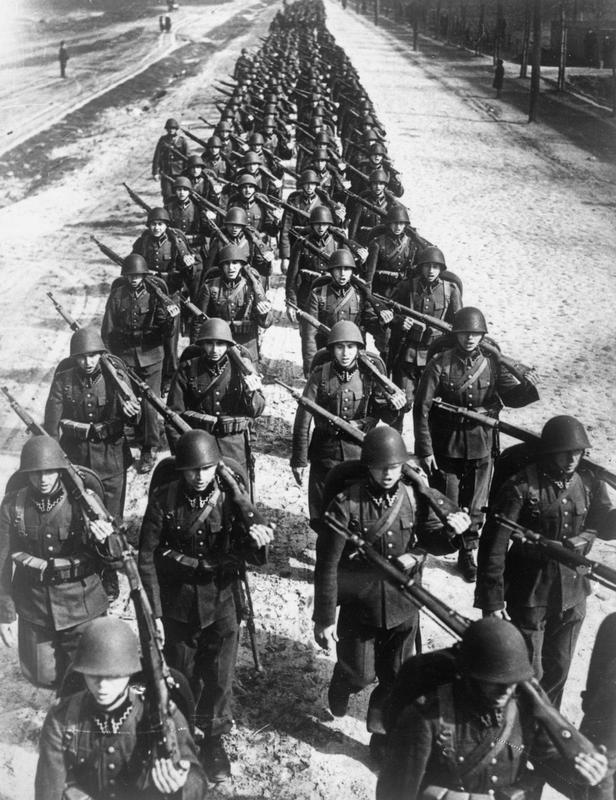
Polish infantry marching, 1939

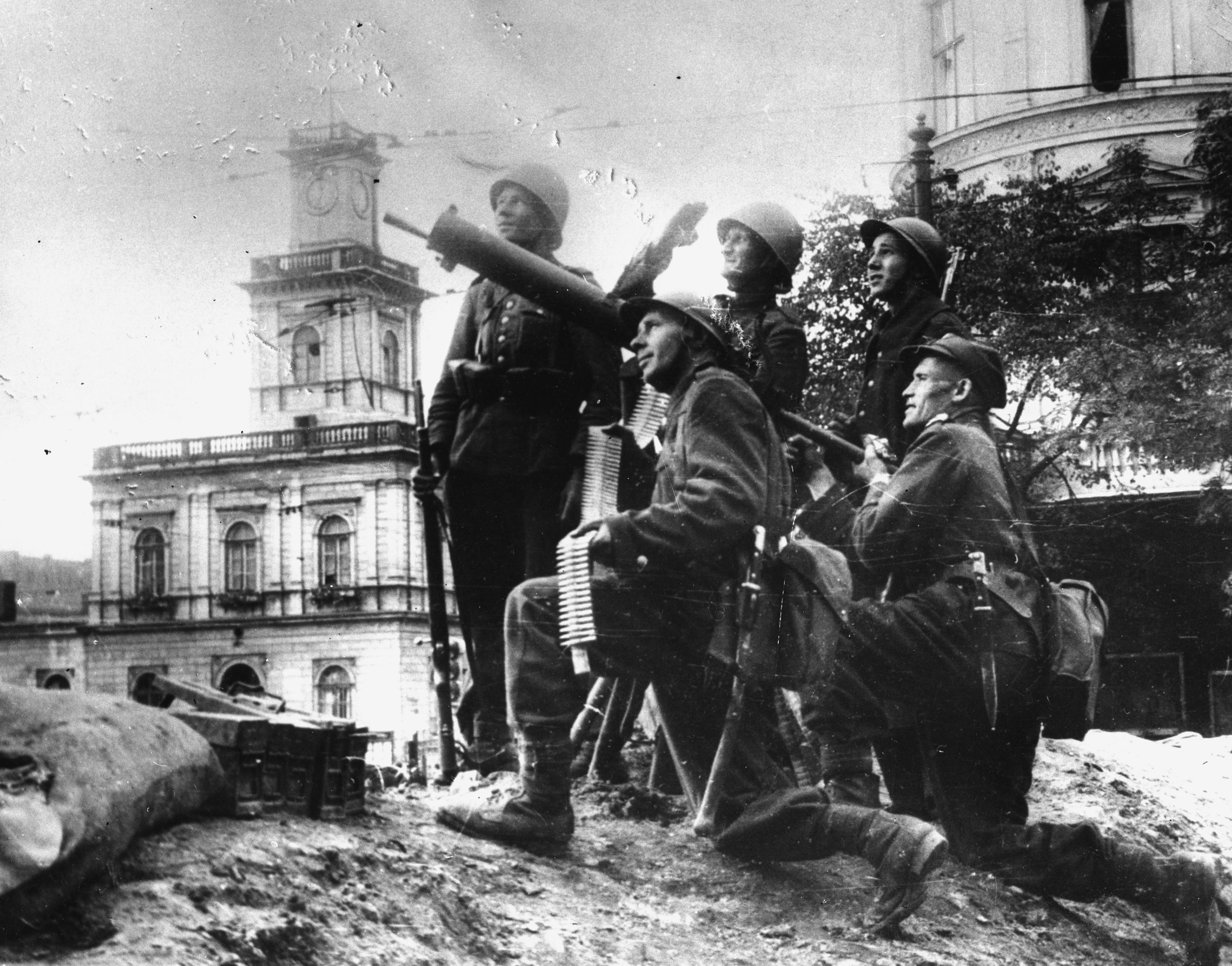
Polish soldiers with anti-aircraft artillery near Warsaw Central Station during the first days of September 1939

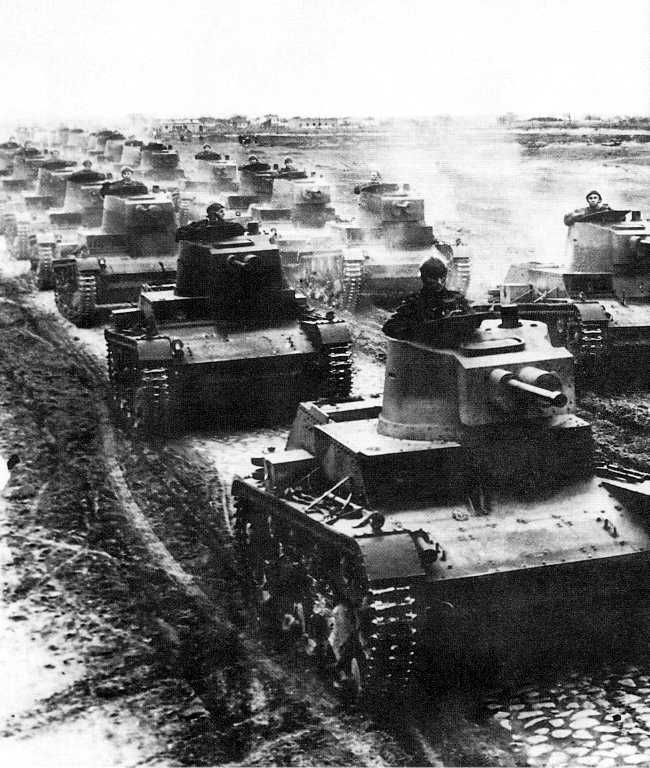
Polish 7TP light tanks

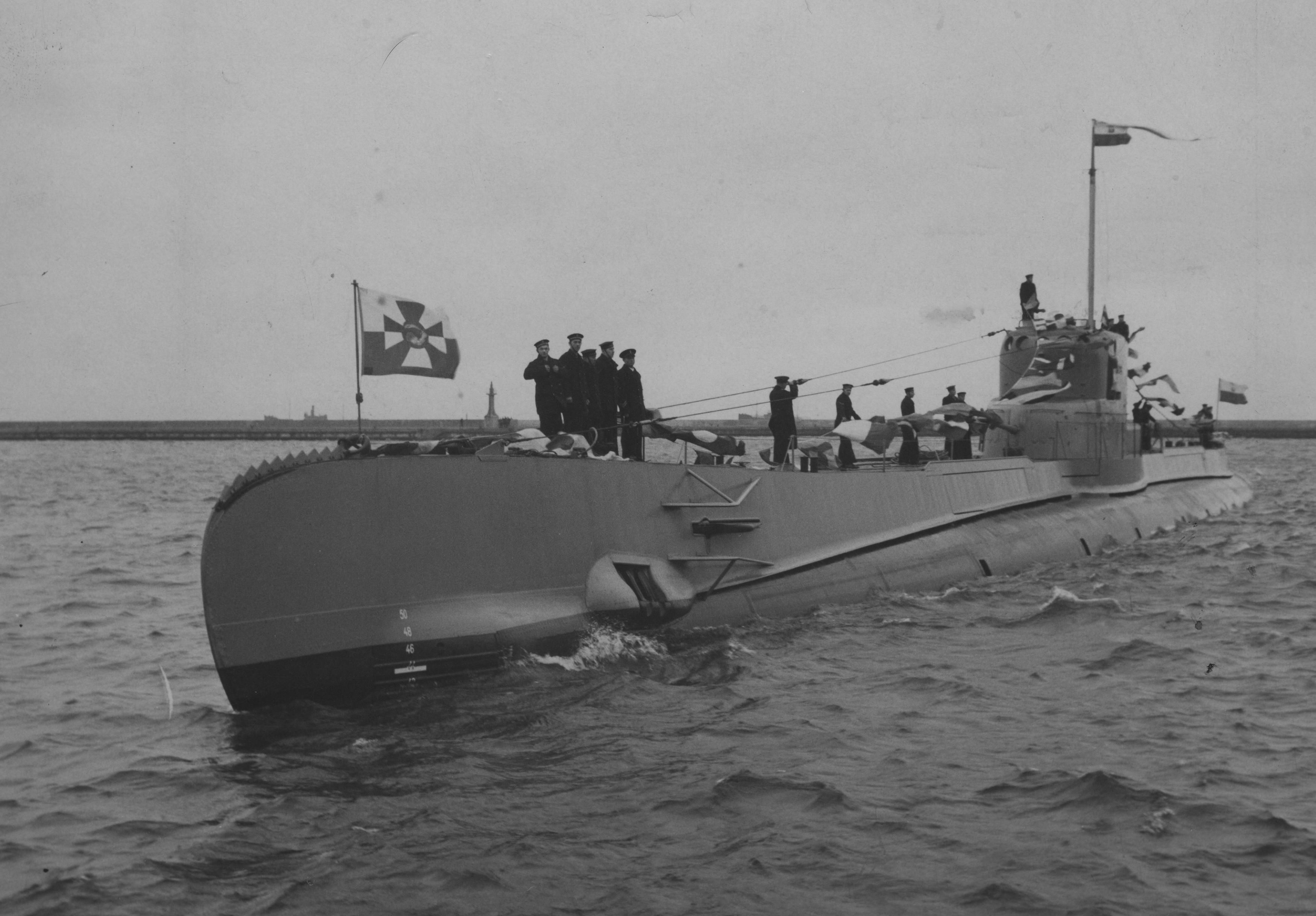
ORP Orzeł was the lead ship of her class of submarines serving in the Polish Navy during World War II.

The beginning of World War II in September 1939 ended the sovereign Second Polish Republic. The Nazi Germany invasion of Poland began on 1 September 1939, one week after Nazi Germany and the Soviet Union signed the Molotov–Ribbentrop Pact. On that day, Germany and Slovakia attacked Poland, and on 17 September, the Soviets attacked eastern Poland. Warsaw fell to the Germans on 28 September after a twenty-day siege. Open organised Polish resistance ended on 6 October 1939 after the Battle of Kock, with Germany and the Soviet Union occupying most of the country. Lithuania annexed the area of Wilno, and Slovakia seized areas along Poland's southern border – including Górna Orawa and Tatranská Javorina - which Poland had annexed from Czechoslovakia in October 1938. Poland did not surrender to the invaders, but continued fighting under the auspices of the Polish government-in-exile and of the Polish Underground State. After the signing of the German–Soviet Treaty of Friendship, Cooperation and Demarcation on 28 September 1939, Polish areas occupied by Nazi Germany either became directly incorporated into Nazi Germany, or became part of the General Government. The Soviet Union, following Elections to the People's Assemblies of Western Ukraine and Western Belarus (22 October 1939), annexed eastern Poland partly to the Byelorussian Soviet Socialist Republic, and partly to the Ukrainian Soviet Socialist Republic (November 1939).

Polish war plans (Plan West and Plan East) failed as soon as Germany invaded in 1939. The Polish losses in combat against the Germans (killed and missing in action) amounted to ca. 70,000 men. Some 420,000 of them were taken prisoners. Losses against the Red Army (which invaded Poland on 17 September) added up to 6,000 to 7,000 casualties and MIA, 250,000 were taken prisoners. Although the Polish Army – considering the inactivity of the Allies – was in an unfavourable position – it managed to inflict serious losses on the enemy: 20,000 German soldiers were killed or MIA, 674 tanks and 319 armoured vehicles destroyed or badly damaged, 230 aircraft shot down; the Red Army lost (killed and MIA) about 2,500 soldiers, 150 combat vehicles and 20 aircraft. The Soviet invasion of Poland and the lack of promised aid from the Western Allies contributed to the Polish forces' defeat by 6 October 1939.

A popular myth is that Polish cavalry armed with lances charged German tanks during the September 1939 campaign. This often repeated account, first reported by Italian journalists as German propaganda, concerned an action by the Polish 18th Lancer Regiment near Chojnice. This arose from misreporting of a single clash on 1 September 1939 near Krojanty, when two squadrons of the Polish 18th Lancers armed with sabres surprised and wiped out a German infantry formation with a mounted sabre charge. Shortly after midnight on the 2nd (Motorised) Division was compelled to withdraw by Polish cavalry, before the Poles were caught in the open by German armoured cars. The story arose because some German armoured cars appeared and gunned down 20 troopers as the cavalry escaped. Even this failed to persuade everyone to reexamine their beliefs — there were some who thought Polish cavalry had been improperly employed in 1939.

Between 1945 and 1990, the Polish government-in-exile operated in London, presenting itself as the only legal and legitimate representative of the Polish nation and challenging the legitimacy of the communist government in Warsaw. In 1990, the last president in exile, Ryszard Kaczorowski, handed the presidential insignia to the newly elected President, Lech Wałęsa, signifying continuity between the Second and Third republics.

== See also ==
- Sugar propaganda in the Second Polish Republic (1925–1932)
- History of Poland (1918–1939)
- 1938 in Poland
- 1939 in Poland
- Polish–Lithuanian Commonwealth, also known as the "First Polish Republic" and described as a "republic under the presidency of the King"

== Bibliography ==
- Snyder, Timothy (2003). The Reconstruction of Nations: Poland, Ukraine, Lithuania, Belarus, 1569–1999 (PDF). New Haven, CT: Yale University Press. ISBN 978-0-300-12841-3.
