= Strzała Bałtyku =

Strzała Bałtyku (English: Baltic Arrow) was an express train of the Polish State Railroads, which in the interbellum period travelled from Warsaw, via Laskowice Pomorskie, to Hel, crossing the distance within 6 hours and 50 minutes.

After the war, the train continued service on a changed, shorter route, going in the early 1960s from Warsaw to Gdynia in 4 hours and 18 minutes. The 1960s train, which used steam engines, was faster than contemporary InterCity Express Kaszub, which takes 4 hours and 26 minutes.

== Route ==
=== 1937–1939 ===
- Warszawa Gdańska – Działdowo – Laskowice – Tczew – Gdynia.

=== Early 1960s ===
- Warszawa - Iława - Gdańsk - Gdynia.

== See also ==
- Luxtorpeda
- Polish Coal Trunk-Line
- Latający Wilnianin
