= Górna Orawa =

Coordinates: 49°21′42″N 19°36′38″E

Gorna Orawa (Slovak: Horná Orava), is northern part of the historical region of Orava (Slovakia), with the capital in Trstená. In the interbellum period, reborn Poland and newly created Czechoslovakia wanted to gain control over this province and by the decision of the Western Powers, it became part of Czechoslovakia. In November 1938, Poland claimed a few villages in Gorna Orawa, inhabited mostly by Slovaks (without the town of Trstena). The villages were captured back by Slovakia in September 1939 (see: Polish September Campaign), and have been part of Slovakia since then.
