= Latający Wilnianin =

Latający Wilnianin (English: Flying Vilnian) was the popular name of a passenger train which in the interbellum period linked Warsaw with Wilno (now Vilnius, Lithuania). Another name for that train was Gwiazda Północy (The Star of the North).

In 1919, it took around 20 hours for a train to cross the distance of 423 kilometers between Warszawa Zachodnia (Warsaw West) and the station in Wilno. In 1939, this distance was crossed in 5 hours and 45 minutes. In the summer of 1939, the fast train left Warsaw daily at 9:05 to arrive at Wilno at 14:50. A second daily train between the two cities left Warsaw West at 16:41 and arrived at Wilno at 22:31.

The trains, both of which finished routes at then-border station of Turmont - Zemgale, Latvia, stopped at the following stations:

- Warsaw Główna
- Warszawa Wschodnia
- Białystok
- Grodno
- Porzecze (32 kilometers northeast of Grodno)
- Turmont - Zemgale, Latvia

== See also ==
- Luxtorpeda
- Polish Coal Trunk-Line
- Strzala Baltyku
- Saint Petersburg–Warsaw Railway
