= Polish–Lithuanian relations during World War II =

The issue of Polish and Lithuanian relations during the World War II is a controversial one, and some modern Lithuanian and Polish historians still differ in their interpretations of the related events, many of which are related to the Lithuanian collaboration with Nazi Germany and the operations of Polish resistance organization of Armia Krajowa on territories inhabited by Lithuanians and Poles. Several common academic conferences started bridging the gap between Lithuanian and Polish interpretations, but significant differences remain.

== Background ==
Polish–Lithuanian relations were strained during the interwar period, mostly due to the conflict over the Vilnius Region (which had a Polish majority but was seen by Lithuanians as their historical capital). This conflict resulted in enmity within local communities and the mutual harsh treatment of the Polish and Lithuanian ethnic minorities living in both countries. The tensions had begun to diminish by early spring of 1938 (see 1938 Polish ultimatum to Lithuania), when both nations restored normal relations, and telephone, mail, rail, and road communications were established. The rapprochement was however stopped when Germany invaded Poland on the first day of September 1939. Germany had proposed Lithuania join in the invasion to gain control of the disputed Vilnius Region. However, despite Lithuania's antipathy towards Poland, the Lithuanian government was distrustful of Germany and refused. Lithuania thus remained neutral and independent in the initial days of World War II. On September 17, the Soviet invasion of Poland began following its Molotov-Ribbentrop Pact. The Vilnius Region was soon occupied by the Red Army, which intended to place it inside the borders of the Belarusian Soviet Socialist Republic. On September 19, Lithuanian envoy in Moscow Ladas Natkevičius claimed Lithuanian rights to Vilnius, which was now occupied by the Red Army and was out of Polish control. After the new German-Soviet border was established on September 28, the Soviets invited the Lithuanians to talks. Negotiations lasted from October 3 to 10. The result of the talks was the "Treaty on Mutual Assistance and Transfer of Vilnius and Vilnius Region to Lithuania," under which, in exchange for Vilnius, Lithuania agreed to establish Soviet military bases on its territory. The agreement came as a result of immense Soviet pressure, and Lithuanian diplomats had no illusions that the presence of Soviet troops meant preparation for annexation. During negotiations, the Soviets threatened the possibility of annexing Vilnius to Soviet Belarus, and even the possibility of reconstituting the Lithuanian-Belarusian SSR.

The Polish envoy in Kaunas, Franciszek Charwat, submitted a protest note on behalf of the Polish government. The Lithuanian side responded that Vilnius was and is an inseparable part of Lithuania, which Poland occupied since 1920. According to Polish military attaché Leon Mitkiewicz-Żołłtek, the Lithuanians' response was even harsher, they were to state that they did not recognize the Polish government in Paris and for them Poland ceased to exist. In response, Charwat left Lithuania, thus officially breaking off Polish-Lithuanian relations and restarting a strong feeling of hostility between the two countries. Nevertheless, the pressing matter for Lithuania now became resisting Soviet pressure: most of the better politically oriented Lithuanian intelligentsia realized that the takeover of the Vilnius region was merely a prelude to the occupation of Lithuania by Soviet forces. Ultimately, on 15 June, the Red Army invaded Lithuania, soon followed up by invasions of the two other Baltic States, Latvia and Estonia. On 3 August, Lithuania was formally annexed to the USSR as the Lithuanian Socialist Soviet Republic. Lithuania remained under the Soviet Union for nearly a year, until on 22 June 1941, Nazi Germany began an invasion of the Soviet Union and crossed the border into Lithuania, thereafter occupying it.

== Conflicting ideologies ==
The Vilnius Region had a complex demographic history. This was further aggravated by Germans forcibly relocating Lithuanian families to the region from western parts of Lithuania.

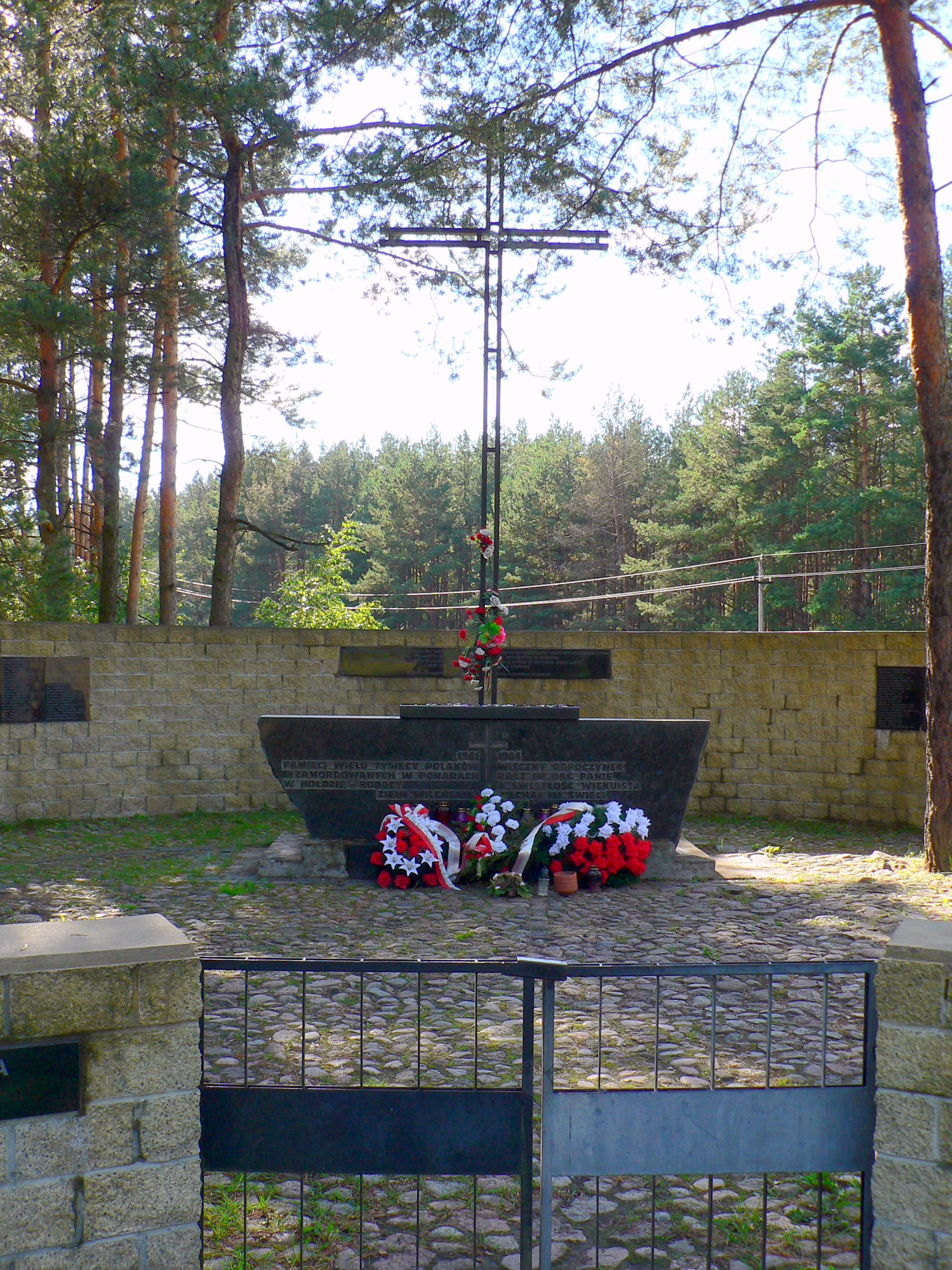
Monument of Polish victims of Ponary massacre. Tens of thousands of Poles and Jews were executed there by Germans and their Lithuanian auxiliaries.

A significant number of Lithuanians started collaborating with the German occupiers, a prominent example being the Lithuanian Activist Front, many members of whom came from the National Unionists whose pre-war slogan was 'Lithuania for Lithuanians'. The Lithuanian government, encouraged by the Germans, hoped that the Germans would grant Lithuania as much autonomy as it has granted Slovakia. Even through LAF faded after 1941, and Germans never granted the Lithuanians the autonomy they desired, elements within the Lithuanian government, collaborating with Germans, engaged in the program of ethnic and racial purification, targeting Jews, Poles and other non-Lithuanian ethnic minorities. Anti-Polish rhetoric and violence became common under the Juozas Ambrazevičius government in 1941 (followed by the role of Petras Kubiliūnas as a puppet counsel to the German rulers). Kubiliūnas led the puppet-Council advising the German government of the "general District Lithuania" (Generalbezirk Litauen) led by Generalkommissar of Lithuania Theodor Adrian von Renteln. Some Lithuanian clergy called for pogroms of Poles, stating that the Poles were worse than the Jews and offered indulgences for killing Poles. A Lithuanian professor wrote a pamphlet on "Why Should we hate the Poles", and LAF campaigned for the establishment of ghettos for Poles, requirement for them to wear identifying badges, and reduction of their food rations, claiming that "under Soviets, we killed 50% of Poles, under Germans we will kill the other 50%". One of the most infamous series of incidents took place in the Paneriai (Polish: Ponary) district of Vilnius, where from 1941 to 1943 Germans and Lithuanians massacred tens of thousands of Jews and Poles.

Around 1943, one of the political factions of the Government Delegation for Poland for the Vilnius region, the Vilnius Democratic Concentration (Polish: Wileńska Koncentracja Demokratyczna) – the underground union of leftist Polish parties, partly because of the pro-Nazi stance of Lithuanian authorities, and partly influenced by the nationalist stance of Polish Endecja party, stated a plan to occupy Lithuania after the war, submit it under the rule of Polish General Commissariat and to re-educate "corrupt" Lithuanians. On 1 March 1944, the Polish Convent of Political Parties issued declaration expressing preparation to fight for Eastern Borderlands (Vilnius, Grodno, Lviv, Lida, Novogrudok, and Pinsk). However, such declarations of local Polish politicians differed significantly from the official statement and actions of the Polish government-in-exile, which was the only country among the anti-Nazi coalition which declared its support for the cause of Lithuanian post-war independence.

Although Lithuanian and Polish resistance movements had common enemies – Nazi Germany and the Soviet Union – they never became allies. The main obstacle in allying was the question of Vilnius – the Polish government in exile and the Polish resistance regarded Vilnius as part of Poland, while Lithuanian resistance regarded Vilnius as the capital of Lithuania. Lithuanian resistance saw the Soviet Union as the main enemy and Nazi Germany as its secondary enemy. Polish resistance saw Nazi Germany as the main enemy and was much more ambiguous on the Soviet Union. Only in 1944–1945, after the Soviet reoccupation, did Lithuanian and Polish resistance start cooperating in the fight against the Soviets.

== Armed conflict ==
Lithuanian authorities had been aiding Germans in their actions against Poles since the very beginning of German occupation in 1941, which resulted in the deaths of thousands of Poles. Thousands of Poles were killed by Lithuanian collaborators working with Nazis (like the German subordinated Lithuanian Security Police or the Lithuanian Territorial Defense Force under the command of general Povilas Plechavičius, many more were deported into Germany as slave labour.) Tadeusz Piotrowski notes that thousands of Poles died at the hand of Lithuanian collaborators, and tens of thousands were deported.

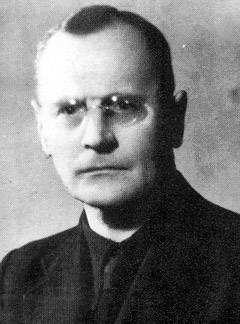
Aleksander Krzyżanowski

In autumn 1943, Armia Krajowa started operations against the Lithuanian collaborative organization, the Lithuanian Security Police, which had been aiding Germans in their operation since its very creation. Polish political and military underground cells were created all over Lithuania, Polish partisan attacks were usually not only in Vilnius Region but across the former demarcation line as well. Soon a significant proportion of AK operations became directed against Nazi Germany allied Lithuanian Police and local Lithuanian administration. During the first half of 1944 AK killed hundreds of Lithuanians serving in Nazi auxiliary units or organizations: policemen, members of village self-defence units, servants of local administration, soldiers of the Lithuanian Territorial Defense Force and other Nazi collaborators. Civilians on both sides increasingly numbered among the casualties.

In response, Lithuanian police, who had murdered hundreds of Polish civilians since 1941, increased its operations against the Poles, executing many Polish civilians; this further increased the vicious circle and the previously simmering Polish–Lithuanian conflict over the Vilnius Region deteriorated into a low-level civil war under German occupation. The scale of disruption grew over time; Lithuanian historian Stanislovas Buchaveckas noted, for example, that AK was able to paralyze the activities of many Lithuanian educational institutions in 1943.

In May 1944, in the battle of Murowana Oszmianka AK dealt a significant blow to the Lithuanian Territorial Defense Force which has been terrorizing local Polish population. At that time, Aleksander Krzyżanowski, AK commander of Vilnius region, commanded over 9000 armed Armia Krajowa partisans.

On 23 June 1944, in response to an earlier massacre on 20 June of 37 Polish villagers in Glitiškės (Glinciszki) by Lithuanian Security Police rogue AK troops from the unit of the 5th Vilnian Home Army Brigade (under the command of Zygmunt Szendzielarz "Łupaszko" who was not present at the events) committed a massacre of Lithuanian policemen and civilians, at Dubingiai (Dubinki), where 27 Lithuanians, including women and children, were murdered. These rogue units were acting against specific orders of Krzyżanowski which forbade reprisals against civilians In total, the number of victims of Polish revenge actions at the end of June 1944 in Dubingiai and neighbouring towns of Joniškis, Inturkė, Bijutiškis, and Giedraičiai, was 70–100 Lithuanians, including many civilians. The Massacre at Dubingiai was the only known massacre carried out by units of AK. Further escalation by either side was cut short by the Soviet occupation of Vilnius region two weeks later.

Polish and Lithuanian historians have to yet reach an agreement on the number of victims. Polish-Lithuanian historian Jarosław Wołkonowski puts the number of Lithuanians killed by rogue AK elements at under 100. An estimate by a Lithuanian investigator Rimas Bružas is that about 500 Lithuanian civilians were killed by Poles during the war. A state commission was established by the Government of Lithuania to evaluate activities of Armia Krajowa in Lithuania which had to present conclusions by 1 December 1993. Not a single member of Armia Krajowa, many veterans of which live in Lithuania, has been charged with any crimes as of 2001. A Lithuanian historian Arūnas Bubnys stated that there were no mass murders carried out by AK (with the only exception being Dubingiai), but that AK was guilty of some war crimes against individuals or selected families; he also notes that any accusations of genocide are false and have an underlying political motive, among them a counteraction to the accusations of widespread Lithuanian collaboration with Germany and crimes committed by units such as the Lithuanian Security Police (see also Holocaust in Lithuania).

== Postwar developments ==
The postwar assessment of AK's activities in Lithuania was a matter of controversy. In Communist Poland the actions of AK in general, and particularly the actions of commanders and units operating in Lithuania, were presented in a very negative light (see Cursed soldiers). The Communist regime executed or imprisoned commanders of the AK en masse after the war for political reasons, preventing any fair legal examination of crimes they may have committed during wartime. Zygmunt Szendzielarz "Łupaszka", after several years in the postwar underground, was arrested by the Polish Communist authorities, sentenced to death and executed on 8 February 1951, for his anti-communist activities. The assessment of his actions outside of Communist Poland was different, and in 1988 he was posthumously awarded the Virtuti Militari, the highest Polish military award, by the Polish government in exile. Similarly, the Lithuanian general Povilas Plechavičius who was engaged in fighting the Polish and Soviet partisans received a medal from the Lithuanian president in post-Soviet Lithuania. For these reasons, the AK is considered to be a controversial organisation in today's Lithuania in a manner somewhat similar to the view taken of Soviet partisans. Similarly, in Lithuania, many heroes of Lithuanian resistance against the Soviets are blamed as Nazi collaborators who cooperated in the murder of the Poles and Lithuanian Jewry, which caused controversy in Poland.

In 1993, Lithuanian Government established commission consisting from historians to evaluate Armia Krajowa activities in Lithuania. Tomas Venclova distanced himself from the commission and called it a "pathetic spectacle" and "anti-Polish propaganda campaign" in one of his essays.

On 20 August 2004, Lithuanian government revoked the ban on using the name 'Armia Krajowa' in public spaces and allowed the renaming of the Polish veterans' organization to include the name of AK. On 9 September 2004, veterans of AK and some veterans of Local Lithuanian Detachment signed a Declaration of Peace. This initiative was encouraged by President of Lithuania Valdas Adamkus, Prime Minister of Lithuania Algirdas Brazauskas and President of Poland Aleksander Kwaśniewski, whose representative, Andrzej Majkowski, together with Lithuanian president and prime minister, was present at the reconciliation ceremony. Veterans of Lithuanian Territorial Defense Force who signed the declaration did so without approval of Union of the Lithuanian Territorial Defense Force's soldiers (Lithuanian: Lietuvos vietinės rinktinės karių sąjunga).

== See also ==
- Lithuanian partisans (1941)
