= Lidia Lwow-Eberle =

Polish medic and archaeologist (1920–2021)

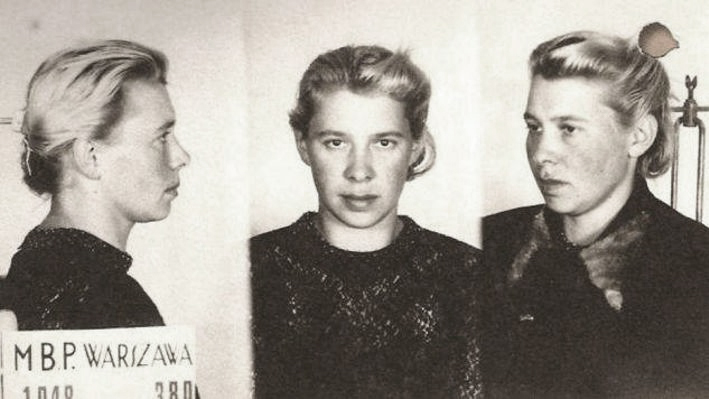
- 1948 mug shots
- Born: Lidia Lvova; 14 November 1920; Plyos, Nerekhtsky Uyezd, Kostroma Governorate, Russian SFSR
- Died: 5 January 2021 (aged 100); Warsaw, Masovian Voivodeship, Third Polish Republic
- Burial place: Powązki Military Cemetery
- Other name: Ewa
- Occupations: Paramedic and archaeologist
- Partner: Zygmunt Szendzielarz
- Children: 1

Lidia Lwow-Eberle (nom de guerre: Ewa; 14 November 1920 – 5 January 2021) was a Russian born Pole and paramedic. She was arrested by the communist authorities and imprisoned "for life". She later married and became an archaeologist.

== Life ==
Lwow-Eberle was born in the Russian town of Plyos in 1920. Her parents were Barbara (née Tuganove) and Leon Lvov. In 1921, her family moved to Poland where her father taught in a secondary school. In time her father became an agronomist. After 1930 her family moved again where her father worked near Wilno. She graduated in 1939, becoming acquinted with Janina Wasałojć and Zygmunt Szendzielarz.

By 1943 she was part of a unit commanded by Antoni Burzyński where she was known as Ewa. The unit was captured and about 80 of the force were killed. Although she was born a Russian, this was not important at the time. The important point was that she was working to create a Polish state.

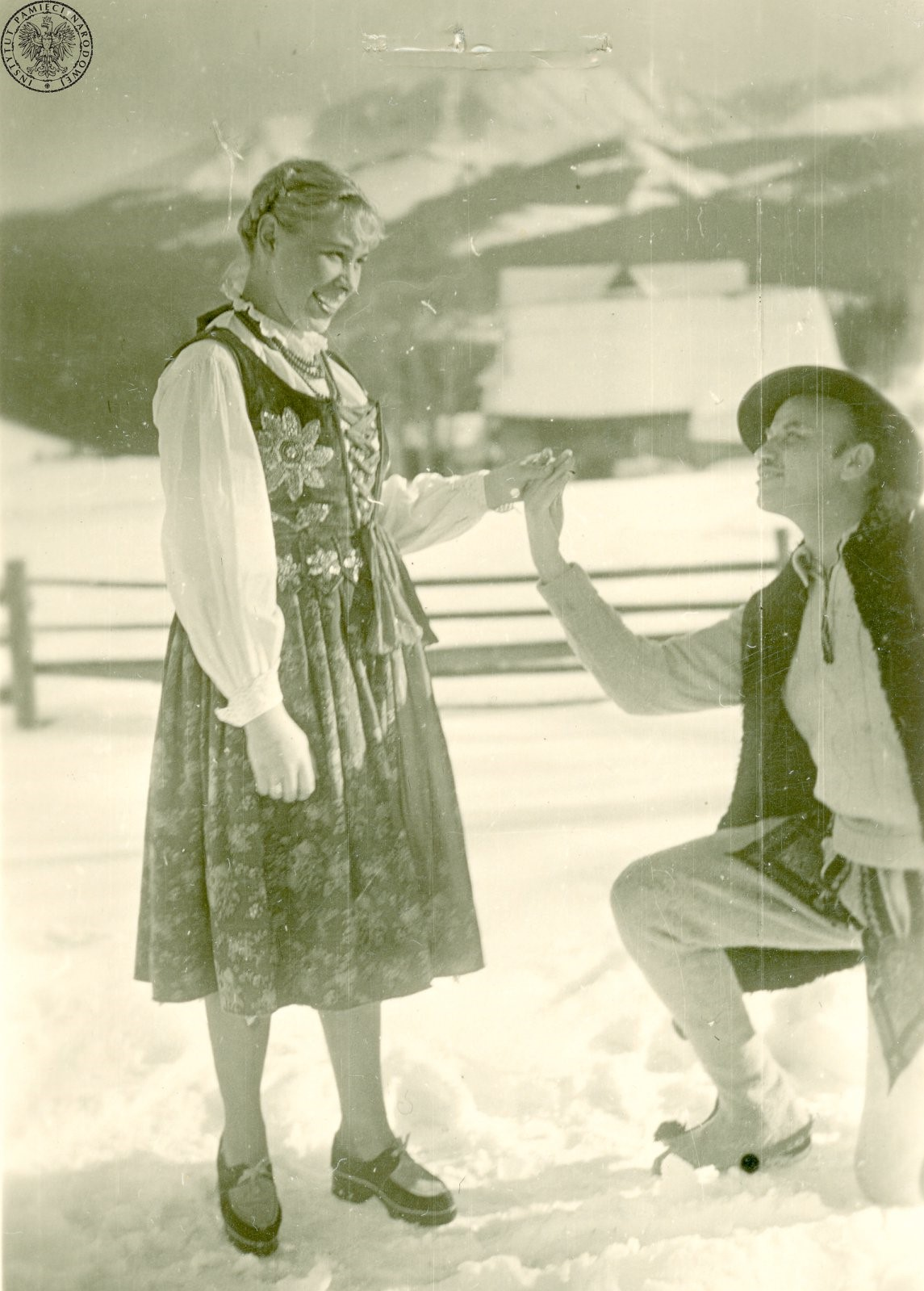
Lidia Lwow and Zygmunt Szendzielarz in 1948

During the war she served as a paramedic in one unit who were captured and then she joined her friend Wasałojć as a nurse in the Brigade of Death which was commanded by Szendzielarz. She rose to be a second lieutenant after fighting the Germans near Worziany in 1944 and then three days later a Soviet partisan group. She was wounded in the battle with the Germans. In February 1945, Szendzielarz's wife died and after that time he became Lwow-Eberle's lover.

They were both arrested on 30 June 1948 by the communist authorities. She was in Osielec, when she was arrested and the others arrested included Lucjan Minkiewicz and his wife Wanda Czarnecka-Minkiewicz, Henryk Borowski and Antoni Olechnowicz. She was sentenced to life imprisonment in 1950 and Szendzielarz was sentenced to death for committing war crimes including the Dubingiai massacre. He was executed on 9 February 1951 in Mokotów Prison.

Lwow-Eberle and Wanda Czarnecka-Minkiewicz were released in 1956 and she set out on a new career as an archaeologist. She married a historian Jan Eberle in 1961 and she graduated in archaeology in 1962. Lwow-Eberle worked at the Museum of Warsaw taking credit for setting up the Museum of the Guild of Leather-based Crafts.

In 2013 it was announced that the authorities had discovered unmarked graves in "Meadows in Powązki" in Warsaw. Amongst them was her post war partner who was identified using DNA comparisons with his close relatives.

Lwow-Eberle died in Warsaw aged 100 years old on 5 January 2021. Her military funeral was in Warsaw on 22 January at the Powązki Military Cemetery.
