= Antoni Olechnowicz =

Polish military officer (1905–1951)

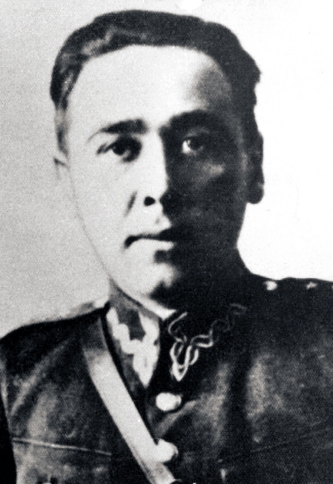
- Antoni Olechnowicz in a Polish military uniform, possibly before 1939
- Born: 13 June 1905; Margumiškis, Vilnius Governorate, Russian Empire
- Died: 8 February 1951 (aged 45); Mokotów Prison, Warsaw, Polish People's Republic
- Cause of death: Execution by shooting

Antoni Olechnowicz (13 June 1905 – 8 February 1951) was a Polish military officer. A Lieutenant Colonel of the Polish Army, he took part in the September Campaign. Arrested by the Soviets, he escaped and returned to his native Vilnius, where he soon joined the Polish underground: the Service for Poland's Victory, the Union of Armed Struggle and finally the Home Army. He took part in the Operation Ostra Brama as commanding officer of the East group attacking the city of Vilnius from the direction of Naujoji Vilnia and Belmontas.

After the success of the operation and the arrest of most of the commanders of the Polish forces by the Soviet NKVD, Olechnowicz was one of the few officers to evade capture and assumed the role of the new commanding officer of the Wilno Home Army Area. In the summer of 1945 he evacuated his headquarters to Central Poland. Arrested by the communist authorities, he was sentenced to death in a show trial and buried in an unmarked grave.

During his service in the underground, he used a variety of noms de guerre, including "Meteor", "Kurkowski", "Pohorecki", "Lawicz", "Krzysztof", "Roman Wrzeski" and "Kurcewicz".

== Early life and Interwar ==
Antoni Olechnowicz was born 13 June 1905 in Margumiškis, a small hamlet near Švenčionys, then in the Russian Empire and now in modern Lithuania. He graduated from a local gymnasium in Naujoji Vilnia in 1926 and immediately afterwards joined the Polish Army. A graduate from the Infantry Officers' School, on 15 August 1929 he was promoted to the rank of Second lieutenant and attached to the Vilnius-based 5th Legions Infantry Regiment. A promising NCO, in 1935 he was allowed to join the Higher War School and in 1937 he was promoted to the rank of Captain and attached to the 20th Infantry Division's headquarters.

== World War II ==
During the 1939 Invasion of Poland he served as a quartermaster of the 33rd Infantry Division. Taken prisoner by the Soviets in early October, he managed to escape and returned to his native Vilnius, where he soon joined the Polish underground: the Service for Poland's Victory, the Union of Armed Struggle and finally the Home Army. He took part in the Operation Ostra Brama as commanding officer of the East group attacking the city of Vilnius from the direction of Naujoji Vilnia and Belmontas.

After the operation ended and most of the commanders of the Polish forces were arrested by the Soviet NKVD, Olechnowicz was one of the few officers to evade capture and assumed the role of the new commanding officer of the Wilno Home Army Area. Following the arrest by the NKVD of Home Army's commander for the Vilnius region, Col. Wileńczyk, Olechnowicz became his successor on 27 March 1945. In contact with the Armed Forces Delegation for Poland, he decided to limit the losses among his men, disband the remaining partisan groups and transfer most of them across the Curzon Line to the areas controlled directly by the new communist authorities of Poland. However, by May, the new Polish-Soviet border, which separated Vilnius from Poland, became more heavily guarded by the NKVD and further evacuation became impossible.

== Post-WWII ==
Also, in early June the local Government Delegate was arrested and it became clear that even remaining in Vilnius was dangerous. In mid-June Olechnowicz fled to Pomerania. By that time it is estimated that there were still around 400 armed partisans in the Soviet-occupied Vilnius region, mostly in small self-defence units, with additional 1,000. The resistance in that region continued until the end of the decade, but on an ever smaller scale.

While in "Lublin Poland", Olechnowicz continued his resistance activities. Together with some of the former partisans evacuated from Vilnius region he formed the "Mobilisation Centre of the Wilno Home Army Area", a communications network intended to keep former soldiers of the Vilnian resistance in contact, should the situation in Europe change. However, due to the Yalta Conference it never did. In December 1945 the partisan units of Maj. Zygmunt Szendzielarz joined Olechnowicz's organisation.

In February 1947 Olechnowicz went to Paris, where he met with the Polish commander-in-chief, by then no longer recognised by Poland's former Allies. Ordered to return to Poland, he continued his resistance activities. However, in 1948 the Ministry of Public Security forces managed to arrest all members of the Mobilisation Centre. Olechnowicz himself was arrested on 26 June 1948 in Wrocław. The others arrested included Lucjan Minkiewicz and his wife Wanda Czarnecka-Minkiewicz, Captain Henryk Borowski, Zygmunt Szendzielarz and Lidia Lwow-Eberle.

After a show trial, Olechnowicz was sentenced to death on 2 November 1949. He was executed on 8 February 1951 at Mokotów Prison. His body was interred in an unmarked grave at the outskirts of the Powązki Military Cemetery.

On 28 February 2014 the Institute of National Remembrance announced, that Olechnowicz's body had been identified following archaeological excavations and a successful identification.
