= Adam Borzobohaty =

Polish engineer and army officer (1909–1992)

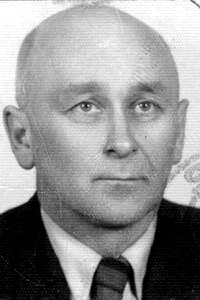
- Born: 24 December 1909; Vilnius, Russian Empire
- Died: 22 August 1992 (aged 82); Bydgoszcz, Poland
- Other names: Jelita, Pietuszok
- Occupation: Agricultural engineer
- Known for: Military activities in the Armed Forces and Home Army
- Awards

Adam Borzobohaty (1909-1992) was a Polish agricultural engineer and an artillery second lieutenant in the Polish and Home Army.

== Biography ==
=== Early life ===
Adam was the son of Maria Dominika née Szrejber (1873-1942), second wife of Konstanty Franciszek. His father was a doctor from the polish noble Jelia family, who settled in 1921 in Nowa Wilejka, 10 km east of Vilnius. During WWI, the family was evacuated to Sumy (today in Ukraine).

Adam studied at the "Saint Casimir" Secondary School in Nowa Wilejka. He then moved to Poznań to get education on agriculture at the University (Polish: Uniwersytet im. Adam Mickiewicz) from 1930 to 1934. After graduation, he worked at the Vilnius Chamber of Agriculture.

In 1929, he volunteered for military service: after his training at the "Volhynian Artillery Reserve Cadet School" in Włodzimierz Wołyński, he got the rank of platoon cadet and was assigned to the 1st division of the 19th Light Artillery Regiment in Nowa Wilejka.

Adam was appointed to the rank of second lieutenant (Polish: Podporuchik) with seniority on 1 January 1933.

In 1935, Borzobohaty transferred to Wesoły Dwór (English: Happy palace) -the family estate- near Zdzięcioł in today's Belarus and worked there as a district agronomist.

=== Invasion of Poland ===
At the outset of WWII, Adam fought in 1939 with the 19th Light Artillery Regiment incorporated into the 19th Infantry Division of the Prussian army. As such, he followed war actions all along the path: Wieluń-Piotrków Trybunalski-Skarżysko-Kamienna-Świętokrzyskie Mountains.

He escaped capture and joined the fights in the capital under the command of Lieutenant colonel Pełczyński. After the capitulation, he moved to Vilnius, where he arrived on 15 October.

=== Occupation period ===
Borzobohaty sheltering place was soon occupied by Soviet forces, as a result of the Treaty of Non-Aggression between Germany and the Union of Soviet Socialist Republics. He then moved underground, contacting Captain Antoni Olechnowicz, aka Pohorecki.

After the outbreak of the German-Soviet war, Adam, known now as Jelita or Pietuszok, gathered with his family from Vilnius to "Wesoły Dwór", where he continued his underground activities:

- co-organizer of the "Mydło" area, part of the Nowogródek District of the Home Army (in present day Belarus);
- commander of an underground Home Army platoon (August 1941-July 1942);
- Home Army soldier of the 8th Infantry Battalion "Bohdanka" in Nowogródek, subordinated to the 77th Infantry Regiment of the 19th Infantry Division;
- in the family estate, sheltering Jews from Vilnius, Zdzięcioł, and Warsaw (including Polish literary critic Ludwik Fryde).

In July 1942, he was arrested by the Gestapo but immediately escaped: under a presumed name, Adam started to work in the village of Szumsk in the Wilno-Troki County.

He was still active in the underground fight, commanding a bicycle-platoon of the 10th Home Army Brigade. As such, he took part in early July 1944 in the Operation Ostra Brama, an attempt by the Home Army to take over Vilnius from Germans evacuating troops ahead of the approaching Red army. Mid-July 1944, after the failure of this action, he avoided disarmament by the Soviet Forces and returned to Vilnius, in his flat at 10 Rossa street.

As this apartment was Antoni Olechnowicz's main place of contact, NKVD set up there a trap, threatening Adam with arrest. As a consequence, he fled at once by a train of repatriates departing from the city of Ignalina (in today's eastern Lithuania). At the end of his journey, he reached Międzyrzecz, a Polish western city on the Obra river, where he first settled under the nameKonstanty Michniewicz.

=== Post war years ===
From 1946 to April 1947, Borzobohaty worked on a farm of the Poznań University in Swadzim.

In May 1947, he was employed as the farm manager by the State Scientific Institute of Medicinal Plant Feedstock (Polish: Państwowy Instytut Naukowy Leczniczych Surowców Roślinnych) in Plewiska near Poznań.

With the transfer of the Home Army District from Vilnius to Poland, he operated as a contact point, e.g. providing money to the families of Home Army members arrested by the NKVD. For this reason, he kept contact with Antoni Olechnowicz, now Lieutenant colonel, last commander of the Vilnius District.

In July 1948, Adam Borzobohaty was apprehended by the Polish communist Security Office. He was sentenced to 6 years of prison in 1949: a year later, the verdict was increased to 8 years with deprivation of civil rights and confiscation of property. He served his sentence first in the Wronki Prison where he met his brother Wojciech. He was then sent to the Central Labour Camp in Potulice. Eventually, after a review of the judgement, Adam was released in December 1954.

From his release onwards, Adam Borzobohaty took many different positions:

- development manager at the Water and Reclamation Works Company (Polish: Przedsiębiorstwo Robót Wodno-Melioracyjnych) in Ostróda (1955-1956);
- work at the Agricultural regional experimental plant (Polish: Rolniczy rejonowy zakład doświadczalny) of the "Presidium of the Provincial National Council (PWRN)-Agricultural Department" in Barzkowice (1957-1958);
- director at a station of the Szczecin PWRN in Prusim (1958-1966);
- head of the field works department at the "Provincial Office of Geodesy and Agricultural Facilities" (Polish: Wojewódzkie Biuro Geodezji i Urządzania Terenów Rolnych) of Bydgoszcz (August 1966 – 1972).

He suffered a heart attack in 1972 that pushed him out of full time activity; he retired in 1974.

In 1990, the Polish government rehabilitated Adam Borzobohaty from the accusations he was victim of under the communist regime and ordered a 200 million Old złotys compensation payment.

Borzobohaty died in Bydgoszcz on 22 August 1992: he was buried in the cemetery of the St. Saint Vincent de Paul parish in Bydgoszcz.

Borzobohaty was the co-founder of the Pastoral Care of Former Residents of the Eastern Borderlands ("Kresy") of the Vilnius-Nowogrodzki district at the parish of the Holy Polish Brothers Martyrs in Bydgoszcz. He also co-established with his brother Wojciech the World Association of Home Army Soldiers.

== Family ==
=== Ancestors ===
- Konstanty Franciszek, Adam's father, studied at a classical gymnasium in Vilnius, then turned to medicine at the University of Moscow. After graduating in 1888, he settled in Szyrwinty. Around 1904 he moved to Vilnius, where he worked until he was mobilized into the Russian army in 1914 and reached the rank of colonel. After World War I, he returned to Vilnius. During the Polish–Soviet War, he was delegated to Czeladź in Silesia.
- Konstanty Franciszek's uncles (Adam's great-uncles):
  - Władysław Borzobohaty (1831-1886), was a doctor who fought during the January Uprising (1863-1864). Searched by the Tsar police after the end of the revolt, he went abroad in Italy and then in Paris. There, he took part in the Franco-Prussian War (1870-1871) and in the subsequent Paris Commune. He moved to Kraków in 1872 and to Lithuania then part of the Russian Empire in 1874. He was arrested there and sentenced by Russian authorities to exile to Arkhangelsk, then to Varnavino. He was allowed to return to Lithuania in 1884;
  - Antoni (1836-1900) was a doctor by trade, running a medical practice in the Nowogródek district. He also took part in the January Uprising with his brother Józef (1811-1865): they both were sentenced to be exiled to the Tomsk Governorate. Józef died there but Antoni returned in 1868 and settled in Biała Podlaska (1868-1873).
  - Bolesław Borzobohaty (1833-?), graduated in 1861 from the Medical and Surgical Academy in St. Petersburg and was a military doctor.
- Konstanty's (Adam's father) first wife was Paulina Szrejber (1863-1903). They had six children: Anna, Maria, Franciszek, Ignacy, Kazimiera and Michalina.
- Maria Dominika (1873-1942), Konstanty's second wife and mother of Adam, was Paulina's (Konstanty's first wife) sister. They had four children: Konstanty, Wojciech, Adam and Paulina.

=== Descendants ===
In August 1935, Adam married Helena Krakowska, the daughter of a merchant from Vilnius. They had three children: Ewa, Kalina and Jacek. Helena died in 1972.

Two years later, Adam married Jadwiga Czernis.

=== Siblings ===
- Adam's brother Wojciech Stanisław Borzobohaty (1908-1991), was a second-lieutenant in the Polish Armed Forces from 1919 to 1939. During WWII, he served in the Home Army (a.k.a. Jelita, Stanisław, Wojan) and reached the rank of Lieutenant colonel. In April 1945, he was the chief of staff of the delegate of the Armed Forces for Poland, Col. Jan Rzepecki. Wounded again, he was arrested by the Red Army in June 1945. On 12 December 1945 the District Military Court in Warsaw sentenced him to death, decision which was commuted by Bolesław Bierut to 10 years of imprisonment. He regained freedom in 1953, but was only rehabilitated by the Supreme Court on 14 May 1965. He then worked voluntarily for military historical associations and co-founded the "Home Army Soldiers Association". He was buried on 17 January 1991 at the Powązki Cemetery. The President of the Republic of Poland, Lech Wałęsa, posthumously promoted him to the rank of brigadier general and honored him with the Commander's Cross of the Order of Polonia Restituta.
- Sisters
  - Kazimiera Radziszewska was a Home Army soldier. She was killed on 14 May 1943 during the Ponary massacre.
  - Maria Borzobohata-Woźnicka (1894-1965) was Adam's half-sister from his father first wife, Paulina Szrejber. In 1913, she graduated from high school in Vilnius and went to Saint Petersburg, where she studied drawing and painting. Graduated in 1916, she returned to Vilnius. In 1920, she married the art and painting critic Stanisław Woźnicki. In 1922, she began studying with Ludomir Sleńdziński and entered the "Vilnius Society of Visual Artists". Maria exhibited her works in Vilnius, Warsaw and Poznań.

== Orders and commemorations ==
- Four time rewarded by the "Army Medal for War 1939-1945" (1948)
- Cross of the Home Army (1973)
- Medal "For participation in the defensive war of 1939" (1987)
- Knight Cross of the Order of Polonia Restituta (1990)

== See also ==
- Home Army
- Operation Ostra Brama
- Bydgoszcz
- Antoni Olechnowicz
- Polish population transfers (1944–1946)

== Bibliography ==
- (in Polish) Kłosiński, Zygmunt. Borzobohaty Adam [biografia] [Borzobohaty Adam [biography]] (in Polish). Vilnius: Towarzystwo Miłośników Wilna i Ziemi Wileńskiej. pp. 1–2.
- (in Polish) Borzobohaty Wojciech [Borzobohaty Wojciech]. Toruń: Fundacja Generał Elżbiety Zawackiej Toruń. 2004.
