= Antoni Burzyński =

Polish Home Army officer

- Born: June 11, 1911; Vilnius
- Died: August or September 1943 (aged 32) unknown
- Cause of death: Execution
- Military career
- Allegiance: Home Army
- Rank: Second Lieutenant
- Nickname: Kmicic
- Awards: Cross of Merit with Swords

Antoni Burzyński nom de guerre Kmicic (11 June 1911 – August/September 1943) was an officer of the Second Polish Republic's Polish Army, the Home Army and commander of the first Polish partisan unit in the Vilnius Region.

Antoni Burzyński was a native of Vilnius, where he received his education and served in the 5th Legions' Infantry Regiment. After fighting in September 1939, he was interned in Lithuania, where he became involved in the Polish underground. He was briefly arrested by the Lithuanian Saugumas. In late 1942 and early 1943 he began forming a partisan unit. Finally formed in March 1943, it was the first partisan unit of the Home Army in the Vilnius Region. By August 1943, the unit had undertaken a number of actions against the German occupiers. On August 26, 1943, Antoni Burzyński went to talks with the command of the Soviet partisans. During them he was treacherously captured and then murdered. His unit was broken up by the Soviets, and about 80 soldiers of the unit were murdered.

== Biography ==
He attended the King Sigismund Augustus Gymnasium in Vilnius and the Divisional Infantry Reserve Cadet Course of the 5th Legions' Infantry Regiment, which he completed, obtaining the ranks of reserve officer cadet and platoon-leader with censure. He then attended the School of Political Science at the Scientific and Research Institute of Eastern Europe in Vilnius, from which he graduated in 1939. In 1938, he was promoted to second lieutenant.

=== World War II ===
After the outbreak of World War II, he was an aide-de-camp to Colonel Stanisław Szyłejko, commander of the southern section of the defense of Vilnius. After the Soviet invasion began the day before, he retreated towards Lithuania. He was interned there on September 18 and placed in a camp, from where he escaped, making his way back to the Vilnius, which was handed over by Soviets to Lithuania on October 29, 1939. He joined the ranks of the Polish resistance, acting in the underground regimental circle of Major Antoni Olechnowicz's 5th Regiment.

In the fall of 1941, he was arrested by the Lithuanian Saugumas, from where he was bailed out in early 1942. After this event he hid in the vicinity of Svir. He sought permission from the command of the Home Army's Vilnius District to form a partisan unit. After it was granted, he began its formation in late 1942 and early 1943.

The unit's first combat action was an attack on the Gelednė railroad station on April 15, 1943, where railroad equipment was destroyed and weapons and ammunition were captured. Meanwhile, from the beginning of July 1943, the unit was authorized to officially act as the Home Army. In August 1943, Kmicic unit successfully attacked the Belarusian Auxiliary Police station of Dunilavichy without any casualties. Other significant actions of the unit include: a skirmish with the Germans near the Stracha estate, a clash near Mikoltsy, and the disarming of a Wehrmacht garrison in Zhodzhishki.

=== Murder of Kmicic and his soldiers ===
The unit, with the strength of about 200-300 men, was stationed in the area of Lake Narach, near the village of Hatavichy. The units of the Soviet partisan "Voroshilov" Brigade under the command of Colonel Fedor Markov also had their encampments in this area. Relations between Polish and Soviet partisans were relatively good until June 1943. At that time, the Central Committee of the Communist Party of Byelorussia issued an order to combat Polish partisan units. Markov's unit was assigned to liquidate the Kmicic's unit. On August 26, 1943, Antoni Burzyński went with three his officers to a Soviet camp to discuss an action on Myadzyel. While the commanders were absent, the Soviet troops of Markov unit under a command of Senior Lt. Derkachev invaded the Polish camp, defeated and captured more than 200 Polish soldiers. About 80 soldiers from his unit were murdered near the village of Zanarach, 80 were let go, and 70 were incorporated into the communist "Polish" unit of Lt. Wincenty Mroczkowski "Zapora", named "Bartosz Głowacki".

At the meeting with the command of the Soviet partisans with Burzyński were: 2nd Lt. J. Wiśniewski "Ostroga", 2nd Lt. Zygmunt Niciński "Twardowski" and Sylwester Jachimiak "Chłop". Of this group, only "Ostroga" and "Twardowski" survived. "Ostroga" later claimed that he managed to escape. "Twardowski," stayed in the ranks of the "Voroshilov" Brigade. The exact date and place of Antoni Burzyński and Sylwester Jachimiak deaths remain unknown. There are unconfirmed accounts that he was tortured and then shot after refusing to cooperate. Markov wrote in his report that he "wanted to avoid a second Katyn," which is why he murdered only 80 Polish soldiers, he also added: "We will cleanse all our regions of this filthy trash."

== Aftermath ==
The destruction of the Kmicic unit did not halt the development of Polish partisans in the Home Army's Vilnius District. New units were soon formed. And the surviving soldiers of "Kmicic" escaped the Soviet partisans and joined the unit formed by Zygmunt Szendzielarz "Łupaszko." Szendzielarz named his unit the Home Army 5th Wilno Brigade or Brigade of Death, as a sign that the brigade's task was to bring justice to the killers. Wincenty Mroczkowski soon escaped from the Soviets and joined Szendzielarz's unit, he claimed that the Soviets had forced him to accept command of "Bartosz Głowacki" unit. He was soon caught communicating with the Soviets and shot while escaping.

After the Union of Polish Patriots became more active, the Soviets decided to make a reconciliation with the Polish troops in the eastern borderlands. To this end, the discredited Markov was ousted, replaced by Capt. Manochin, who in a conciliatory letter sent to Szendzielarz in September 1943 admitted that the Soviets had murdered Polish soldiers. The document, dated November 10, 1943 and signed by Derkachev, who commanded the attack on the Polish camp, includes not only an admission of committing the crime, but also the identification of Soviet Chief of Staff Panteleimon Ponomarenko as the main executive ordering it. Ponomarenko later, on November 1, 1943, issued a similar order to liquidate the Stolpce battalion of the Home Army, residing in the Naliboki forest in the Novogrudok region.

== Legacy ==
In 2018, the original standard of the Kmicic unit was donated to the Polish Army Museum in Warsaw. The museum's director Adam Buław said that the history of the unit serves as a symbol of "the tragic fate of Polish armed formations in the borderlands of the Second Polish Republic."

== Bibliography ==
- Gasztold, Tadeusz (1993). "Armia Krajowa i ludność cywilna na Kresach Północno-Wschodnich w świetle sowieckich dokumentów w latach 1941-1944" [The Home Army and the civilian population in the Northeastern Borderlands in the light of Soviet documents in 1941-1944] (PDF). Słupskie Studia Historyczne. 2.
- Motyka, Grzegorz (2014). Na Białych Polaków obława. Wojska NKWD w walce z polskim podziemiem 1944–1953 [Manhunt for White Poles. NKVD troops in the fight against the Polish underground, 1944–1953]. Kraków.
- Tuszynski, Marek; Denda, Dale F. (1999). "Soviet war crimes against Poland during the Second World War and its aftermath: a review of the factual record and outstanding questions". The Polish Review. 44 (2).
