= Jan Sas-Giliczyński =

- Born: Jan Giliczyński; July 5, 1896; Tarnopol, Austria-Hungary (now Ternopil, Ukraine)
- Died: April 19, 1986 (aged 89); Kraków, Poland
- Resting place: Military Cemetery at Prandoty Street, Kraków
- Education: Jan Kazimierz University of Lwów
- Occupation: Bacteriologist
- Known for: Photography, numismatics, bibliophilia, museum work

Jan Sas-Giliczyński (born 5 July 1896 in Tarnopol, died 19 April 1986 in Kraków) was a Polish doctor of chemistry, bacteriologist, soldier of the Union of Armed Struggle-Home Army, photographer, bibliophile, numismatist, and museum curator.

== Biography ==
He was born on 5 July 1896 in Tarnopol. He was of Greek Catholic faith. In 1914, he completed the eighth grade and passed the final exam at the Jan Długosz IV State Gymnasium in Lviv. He graduated from Jan Kazimierz University of Lwów.

At the end of World War I, in November 1918, he participated in the Battle of Lwów (1918–1919) as part of the Polish–Ukrainian War. During World War II, he served as a soldier in the Union of Armed Struggle-Home Army. From his youth, he was an amateur photographer. He was a co-founder of the Lviv Photographic Society and the Kraków Photographic Society and became an honorary member of these organizations. He was also a co-organizer and curator of the Museum of Photography in Kraków. A bibliophile, he possessed numismatic collections. He collaborated with the National Museum in Kraków-E. Hutten-Czapski Collection. By education, he was a doctor of chemistry. By profession, he was a bacteriologist. He cooperated with the émigré Circle of Lvivians in London and disseminated content published in its "Bulletin" in the People's Republic of Poland.

He died on 19 April 1986 in Kraków. He was buried at the Military Cemetery at Prandoty Street, Kraków on 29 April 1986.

== Awards and honors ==
- Silver Cross of the Order of Virtuti Militari
- Cross of Defense of Lwów
- Commemorative Badge "Orlęta"
- Various Polish and foreign decorations
