= Operation Wilno =

Operation Wilno may refer to:

- Operation Ostra Brama (or Wilno uprising) of 1944
- Vilna offensive of 1919
