= Dubingiai massacre =

1944 murders of Lithuanian civilians by the Polish Home Army

- Part of World War II
- Dubingiai (Lithuania)
- Location: 55°04′00″N 25°27′00″E; Dubingiai, Generalbezirk Litauen, Reichskommissariat Ostland (now in Lithuania)
- Date: 23 June 1944
- Target: Lithuanian civilians
- Attack type: Massacre (war crime)
- Deaths: 27 (In Dubingiai); 70-100 in Dubingiai and Neighboring villages
- Victims: Lithuanians and Lithuanian Auxiliary Police men
- Perpetrator: Home Army 5th Wilno Brigade: Zygmunt Szendzielarz
- No. of participants: ~50
- Motive: Retaliation for Glinciszki massacre and scaring the Lithuanians

The Dubingiai massacre was a mass murder of Lithuanian civilians committed by the Polish Home Army (AK) in the town of Dubingiai and its surroundings on 23 June 1944.

The Dubingiai massacre started a wider Polish Home Army (AK) operation in which units beyond the 5th Brigade were involved. By the end of June 1944, a total of 70–100 Lithuanians were killed in Dubingiai and the neighbouring villages of Joniškis, Inturkė, Bijutiškis, and Giedraičiai. While Nazi collaborators were ostensibly the prime targets, the victims also included the elderly, children, and infants of 4 and 11 months.

The AK's 5th Wilno Brigade committed the massacre in reprisal for the Glinciszki (Glitiškės) massacre of Polish civilians done on 20 June 1944 by the 258th Lithuanian Police Battalion. Further conflicts between Lithuanian and Polish units were prevented by the Soviet capture of Vilnius in mid-July 1944.

== Background ==
Lithuanian–Polish relations during the interbellum period were strained since they both laid claim to the Vilnius Region. During World War II, these tensions were exacerbated by different allegiances; Lithuanian administration and paramilitary units were leaning towards Nazi Germany, while Polish resistance waged an active partisan war against the Nazis. Eventually, these tensions grew into a low-level civil war that culminated in a series of civilian massacres.

On March 4, the Home Army 'Błyskawica" unit attacked and captured the Lithuanian Auxiliary Police center in Dubingiai. The Lithuanians lost 1 soldier and 2 were taken captive.

On 20 June 1944, members of the AK killed four members of the 258th Lithuanian Police Battalion in the village of Glitiškės (Glinciszki). In retaliation, the Lithuanian police killed 39 Polish villagers (the Glinciszki massacre). In light of these events, as well as other information about intensified pacification actions by the Lithuanian forces, the AK command for the Vilnius Region, under Aleksander Krzyżanowski codename Wilk, assumed that it represented a beginning of a new, large anti-Polish operation and only a demonstration of the strength of Polish forces in the region could stop the killings and protect the Polish civilians. Leaflets were distributed through the region saying that AK was planning to execute members of the Lithuanian units guilty of the Glinciszki massacre, and a raid on the pre-war Lithuanian Republic territory was planned. The AK command did not plan, and actually strictly forbade, any reprisals against innocent civilians.

== Murders in Dubingiai ==
The 5th Brigade of AK, under the command of Zygmunt Szendzielarz codename Łupaszko, learned that some of the individuals responsible for the Glinciszki massacre and their families were stationed in the police station in Dubingai. A company of the 5th Brigade under Wiktor Wiącek codename Rakoczy decided to destroy the police station and to execute several Nazi-Lithuanian informants. There are different versions as to who led the raid on Dubingiai; most sources attribute it to Szendzielarz, the commander of the 5th Brigade, while Henryk Piskunowicz, Polish historian and author of several publications about AK operations in Vilnius Region, specifically pointed to Wiącek. The AK headquarters learnt of that initiative and was afraid that the soldiers of the 5th Brigade who had freshly witnessed the aftermath of Glinciszki may not follow the orders forbidding actions against civilians. It sent a courier from the headquarters in Vilnius ordering the 5th Brigade to stay put. The courier, however, did not reach the local commanders in time.

The village was warned that the Polish attack was imminent and many individuals—including the policemen who participated in the Glinciszki massacre—escaped before the Poles began the killings. The AK targeted the Lithuanian populace, using Lithuanian prayer books as a means of identifying Lithuanians, but sparing those intermarried with Poles. While Nazi collaborators were ostensibly the prime targets, the victims included the elderly, children, and even infants. A Polish woman and her 4-year-old son were also reported to have been killed. The total number of victims is estimated between 20 and 27.

== Further reprisals ==
Mourning ceremonies in the village of Bajorai over the bodies of the Vinslovas family, who were executed on June 23, 1944 in the village of Vymančiai during a retaliatory action by the 5th Brigade of the AK.

The reprisal actions in Dubingiai, even if premature and unplanned by AK command, marked the beginning of a wider AK operation in which units beyond the 5th Brigade were involved. From 25 to 27 June, various Polish units entered pre-war Lithuanian territory and carried out a series of actions against Lithuanian Auxiliary Police Battalions and those labeled as Nazi sympathizers. Bridges and telecommunication lines were destroyed. Polish sources note that a number of civilian casualties occurred as a result of the wider operations during that period, particularly when several buildings caught fire. According to Lithuanian sources, in total, 70–100 Lithuanian civilians were killed by the end of June 1944 in Dubingiai and the neighbouring villages of Joniškis (12 people by a squadron commanded by AK member codename Maks), Inturkė, Bijutiškis, and Giedraičiai. Lithuanian historian Arūnas Bubnys lists the following casualties in villages of Molėtai district: 8 people in Vymančiai, 4 people in Roputėnai, 2 people in Ažuožeriai, 17 people in Alkūnai. The youngest victim was a 4-month-old baby.

== Aftermath ==
Piskunowicz contends that AK's reprisals of 23–27 June were successful since there were no further actions by Lithuanian forces similar to the preceding Glinciszki massacre. This contention is, however, largely speculative as any potential for further escalation by either side was cut short by the Soviet occupation of Vilnius two weeks later.

This chain of events stained the reputation of AK in Lithuania and continued to sour Lithuanian–Polish relations. Zygmunt Szendzielarz, commander of the 5th Brigade, which was responsible for the massacre, became a member of the Polish anti-Soviet resistance and was arrested in 1948 by the communist Polish secret police. After more than two years of torture and interrogation, he was executed by the communist Polish government in 1951. In 1993, after the fall of communism, Szendzielarz was rehabilitated and declared innocent of all charges by the Military Chamber of the Supreme Court. Szendzielarz continues to receive posthumous honors: order of Polonia Restituta from President Lech Kaczyński in 2007, promotion to Lieutenant General by Minister of Defense Antoni Macierewicz, and a speech by President Andrzej Duda praising Szendzielarz and urging Polish youth to follow his example in 2016, each time causing negative press in Lithuania.

In 1992, Lithuanian authorities opened a criminal case regarding AK massacres in Molėtai district. The investigation recorded at least 273 Lithuanian deaths in 1943–45, but was unable to determine the identities of the AK members responsible. Since the AK commanders were already dead, the case was closed in 1996.

== Bibliography ==
=== Secondary sources ===
- Snyder, Timothy (2004). The Reconstruction of Nations: Poland, Ukraine, Lithuania, Belarus, 1569–1999. Yale University Press. ISBN 9780300105865.

==== Lithuanian ====
- Bubnys, Arūnas (2015). Pasipriešinimo judėjimai Lietuvoje Antrojo pasaulinio karo metais: lenkų pogrindis 1939–1945 m. [Resistance movements in Lithuania during the Second World War: the Polish underground 1939–1945] (in Lithuanian). Lietuvos istorijos institutas. ISBN 9789955847960.
- Galinis, Tadas (1995). "Dubingių skerdynės" [Dubingiai massacre]. In Garšva, Kazimieras (ed.). Armija krajova Lietuvoje [Home Army in Lithuania] (in Lithuanian). Vol. I. "Vilnijos" draugija, Armijos krajovos aukų klubas, Lietuvos politinių kalinių ir tremtinių sąjunga. ISBN 9986-577-02-0.
- Lebionka, Juozas (1999). "Ar vilniškė AK tikrai kovojo antihitlerinės koalicijos pusėje?". In Garšva, Kazimieras (ed.). Armija krajova Lietuvoje [Home Army in Lithuania] (in Lithuanian). Vol. II. "Vilnijos" draugija, Lietuvos politinių kalinių ir tremtinių sąjunga. ISBN 9986-577-29-2.
- Zizas, Rimantas (1995). Garšva, Kazimieras (ed.). Armija krajova Lietuvoje [Armijos krajovos veikla Lietuvoje 1942–1944 m.] (in Lithuanian). Vol. I. "Vilnijos" draugija, Armijos krajovos aukų klubas, Lietuvos politinių kalinių ir tremtinių sąjunga. ISBN 9986-577-02-0.

==== Polish ====
- Korab-Żebryk, Roman (1991). Biała księga w obronie Armii Krajowej na Wileńszczyźnie [A white paper in defense of the Home Army in the Vilnius region] (in Polish). Wydawnictwo Lubelskie. ISBN 83-222-0699-2.
- Kozłowski, Patryk (2004). Jeden z wyklętych. Zygmunt Szendzielarz "Łupaszko" [One of the cursed. Zygmunt Szendzielarz "Łupaszko"] (in Polish). Warsaw: Rytm. ISBN 83-7399-073-9.
- Piotrowski, Tadeusz (1997). Poland's Holocaust. McFarland & Company. ISBN 0-7864-0371-3.
- Piskunowicz, Henryk (1997). "Działalnośc zbrojna Armi Krajowej na Wileńszczyśnie w latach 1942–1944" [Armed activity of the Home Army in the Vilnius region in 1942–1944]. In Strzembosz, Tomasz (ed.). Armia Krajowa na Nowogródczyźnie i Wileńszczyźnie (1941–1945) [Home Army in the Novogrudok and Vilnius regions (1941–1945)] (in Polish). Warsaw: Institute of Political Sciences, Polish Academy of Sciences. OCLC 260093731.
- Rokicki, Paweł (2015). Glinciszki i Dubinki. Zbrodnie wojenne na Wileńszczyźnie w połowie 1944 roku i ich konsekwencje we współczesnych relacjach polsko-litewskich [Glinciszki and Dubinki. War crimes in the Vilnius Region in mid-1944 and their consequences in contemporary Polish-Lithuanian relations] (PDF). Monografie (in Polish). Warsaw: Institute of National Remembrance. ISBN 978-83-8229-224-4.
- Tomaszewski, Longin (1992). Kronika Wileńska 1941–1945: z dziejów Polskiego Państwa Podziemnego [Vilnius Chronicle 1941–1945: From the History of the Polish Underground State] (in Polish). Warsaw: Pomost. ISBN 83-85521-09-7.

=== News sources ===
==== Lithuanian ====
- Butrimas, Eldoradas (26 April 2016). "Dėl Dubingių žudynių – Lenkijos valdžios pagyros" [For the Dubingiai massacre - the praise of the Polish authorities]. Lietuvos rytas (in Lithuanian). Archived from the original on 16 January 2021.
- Ivaškevičius, Arūnas (8 June 2007). "Lietuviai ir lenkai: istorinės neapykantos pėdsakais" [Lithuanians and Poles: traces of historical hatred]. delfi.lt (in Lithuanian).
- Komaras, Jacekas (2007). "Ordinas majorui Lupaszkai – apgalvotas akibrokštas Lietuvai ar dvynių Kaczynskių kvailystė?" [The order for Major Łupaszka - a deliberate slap in the face for Lithuania or the Kaczyński twins' folly?]. Lietuvos Rytas (in Lithuanian). Archived from the original on 24 July 2011.

==== Polish ====
- wyborcza.pl (14 February 2001). "Litewska prokuratura przesłuchuje weteranów AK" [The Lithuanian prosecutor's office interrogates Home Army veterans]. Gazeta Wyborcza (in Polish).
- Jankowski, Stanisław M. (2000). "Strzały na Wileńszczyźnie" [Shots in the Vilnius region]. Nasza Gazeta (in Polish). Vol. 13, no. 449.
- Żmijewska, Monika (11 June 2003). "Epopeja "Łupaszki"". Gazeta Wyborcza – Białystok (in Polish). Archived from the original on 5 March 2012.
