= Jarosław Wołkonowski =

Jarosław Wołkonowski (born 19 May 1956) is a Polish-Lithuanian historian, Doctor of Philosophy with Habilitation affiliated with the University of Białystok (in Białystok, Poland, where he holds the title of university professor) and the University of Vilnius (in Vilnius, Lithuania, where he lives). From 1998 until 2011 he was the president of the Association of Polish Scientists in Lithuania (Związek Naukowców Polskich na Litwie, sometimes Stowarzyszenie Naukowców Polskich na Litwie).

His interests and research are centered on history of Poland and history of Lithuania, particularly the Polish-Lithuanian relations during the World War II; interactions between Polish and Lithuanian ethnic groups in the Vilnius region and issues involving Polish Secret State and Armia Krajowa operations in that region.

== Works ==
- Sympozjum historyczne “Rok 1944 na Wileńszczyźnie”: Wilno 30 czerwca–1 lipca 1994r. (ed.), Warsaw: Biblioteka “Kuriera Wileńskiego,” 1996,
- Okręg Wileński Związku Walki Zbrojnej - Armii Krajowej w latach 1939-1945, Warszawa 1996
- Stosunki polsko-żydowskie w Wilnie i na Wilenszczyznie 1919-1939, Wydawnictwo Uniwersytetu w Białymstoku, ISBN 83-7431-007-3, 2004,
