= Zygmunt Szendzielarz =

Officer, cursed soldier, Polish partisan

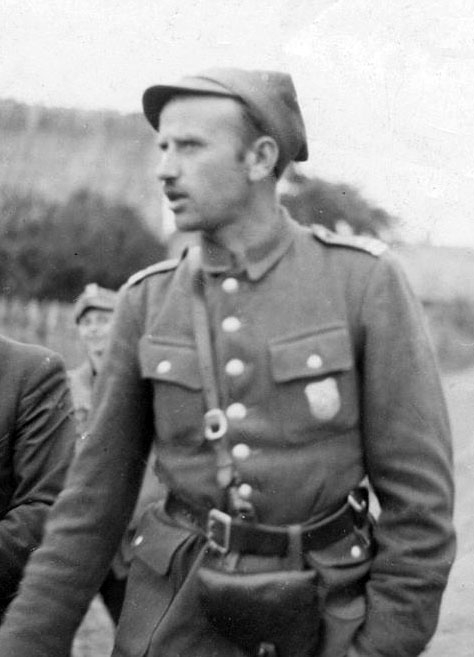
- Rotmistrz Szendzielarz before 1948
- Born: 12 March 1910; Stryj, Galicia, Austria-Hungary
- Died: 8 February 1951 (aged 40); Mokotów Prison, Warsaw, Polish People's Republic
- Cause of death: Execution by shooting
- Spouse(s): 1. died 1945; 2. Lidia Lwow-Eberle (unmarried)
- Military career
- Nicknames: Łupaszka, Łupaszko
- Awards: Order of Virtuti Militari (Gold Cross); Order of Virtuti Militari (5th Class); Cross of Valour

Zygmunt Szendzielarz (12 March 1910 – 8 February 1951, nom de guerre "Łupaszka".) was the commander of the Polish 5th Wilno Brigade of the Home Army (Armia Krajowa) and after the Second World War fought against the Red Army. The unit also committed the Dubingiai massacre, murdering twenty seven Lithuanian civilians on 23 June 1944.

Following the postwar Soviet takeover of Poland he was arrested, accused of numerous crimes, and executed in Warsaw's Mokotów Prison as an anti-communist diehard soldier.

In 1993, after the fall of communism, he was rehabilitated and declared innocent of all charges. In 2007 Polish president Lech Kaczyński posthumously awarded him the order of Polonia Restituta.

== Early life ==
Szendzielarz was born in Stryj (Austrian Partition, now Lviv Oblast, Ukraine), then part of Austria-Hungary and from 1919 to 1939 in Poland, into the family of a railway worker. After graduating from primary school in Lwów, he attended a biological-mathematical gymnasium in Lwów and then Stryj. After graduating, he volunteered for the Polish Army and completed Infantry Non-commissioned officer School in Ostrów Mazowiecka (1932), then Cavalry NCO School in Grudziądz. He was promoted to lieutenant and transferred to Vilnius, where he assumed command of a squadron in the 4th Niemen Uhlan Regiment.

On 28 January 1939, he married Anna Swolkień, daughter of Konstanty and Wanda (landowners from Szajkuny), at St. Ignatius Church in Vilnius. The wedding reception was held at the George Hotel.

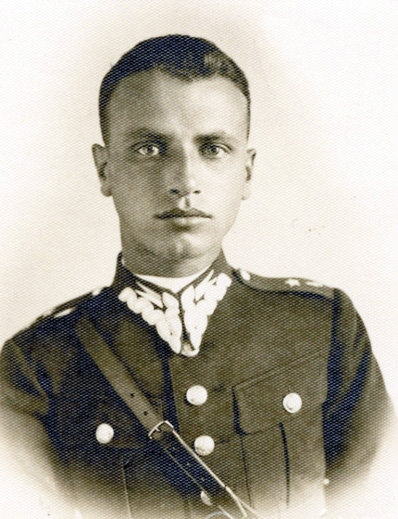
The young Zygmunt Szendzielarz, before World War II

== World War II ==
=== Invasion of Poland (1939) ===
With his unit, he took part in the 1939 September Campaign. His unit was attached to the Wilno Cavalry Brigade under General Władysław Anders, part of the Prussian Army. After retreating from northern Poland, Gen. Anders' forces fought their way towards the city of Lwów and the Romanian Bridgehead. However, in the area of Lublin Szendzielarz's unit was surrounded and suffered heavy losses. Soon afterwards Szendzielarz was taken prisoner of war by the Soviets, but he managed to escape to Lwów, where he lived for a short period under a false name. He tried to cross the Hungarian border to escape from Poland and reach the Polish Army in France, but failed and finally moved with his family to Vilnius.

He arrived in Vilnius on November 16, 1939, where he reunited with his wife and his newborn daughter, Barbara. There, he went into hiding from the Lithuanian secret police, Sauguma, under the name Władysław Hawling. He attempted to make his way to France or England; after failing, he decided to join underground resistance activities.

=== Brigade of Death ===
In Vilnius, Szendzielarz started working on various posts under false names. Probably in mid-1940, he joined the underground resistance, becoming involved in regimental circles. It was then that he likely adopted the pseudonym "Łupaszka" in honor of a legendary cavalry commander from the Polish-Soviet War of 1920 Jerzy Dąbrowski. He then became involved in intelligence work, only to be delegated in August to take command of a Polish partisan unit led by Antoni Burzyński "Kmicic", who was to be recalled to Vilnius.

While Szendzielarz was travelling with his brother-in-law Edward Swolikień "Szaszka", Longing Wojciechowski "Ronin' and Zdzisław Trzebski "Nieczuj" to take over his post, on August 26, 1943, Antoni Burzyński went with three his officers to a Soviet partisan unit of Fedor Markov camp to discuss a joint action on Myadzyel. While the commanders were absent, the Soviet troops of Markov unit under a command of Senior Lt. Derkachev invaded the Polish camp, defeated and captured more than 200 Polish soldiers. About 80 soldiers from his unit were murdered near the village of Zanarach, 80 were let go, and 70 were incorporated into the communist "Polish" unit of Lt. Wincenty Mroczkowski "Zapora", named "Bartosz Głowacki". Antonit Burzyński was missing, most probably killed by Soviets soon after.

And the surviving soldiers of "Kmicic" escaped the Soviet partisans and joined the unit formed by Zygmunt Szendzielarz "Łupaszko." Szendzielarz named his unit the Home Army 5th Wilno Brigade or Brigade of Death, as a sign that the brigade's task was to bring justice to the killers. Wincenty Mroczkowski soon escaped from the Soviets and joined Szendzielarz's unit, he claimed that the Soviets had forced him to accept command of "Bartosz Głowacki" unit. He was soon caught communicating with the Soviets and shot while escaping.

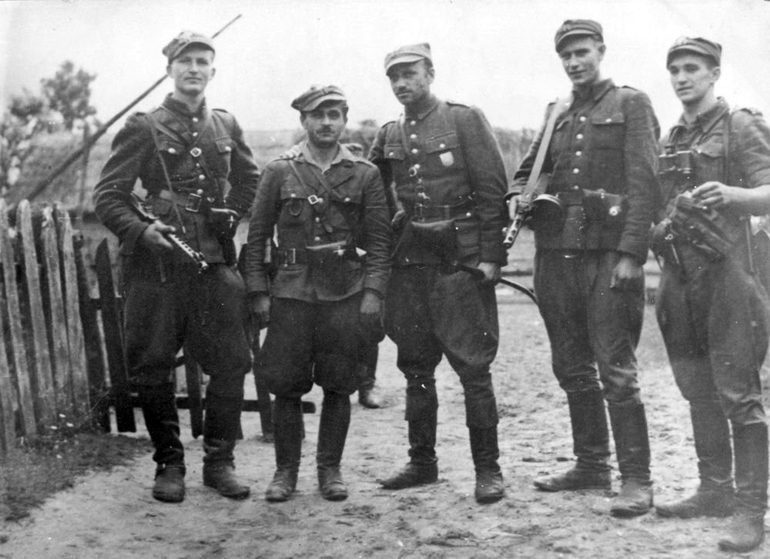
Soldiers of the 5th Wilno Brigade. From left: ppor. Henryk Wieliczko ("Lufa"), por. Marian Pluciński ("Mścisław"), mjr Zygmunt Szendzielarz ("Łupaszka"), NN, por. Zdzisław Badocha ("Żelazny")

Łupaszko's unit fought against the Wehrmacht and Waffen-SS units in the Vilnius Region, but it was also frequently attacked by the paradropped Soviet partisans. In April 1944, Zygmunt Szendzielarz was arrested by the Lithuanian police and handed over to the Gestapo. Łupaszko was free in the same month under circumstances that remain unclear. In reprisal actions, his brigade captured several dozen German officials and sent several threatening letters to Gestapo but it remains unknown if and how these contributed to his release.

==== Dubingiai massacre (20 June 1944) ====
On June 20, near the Glinciszki manor, Łupaszko organized an ambush on Lithuanian policemen from the Podbrzezie station, in which four were killed. In revenge for this action, Lithuanian policemen, later that same day, massacred 39 residents of Glinciszki and nearby villages. News of this crime quickly reached Łupaszko, who almost immediately decided to carry out a retaliatory action. Among the soldiers of his unit, there was an atmosphere of outrage and a desire for revenge.

Szendzielarz’s unit, stationed in the vicinity of Sužionys, about 18 km east of the site of the massacre, was the only Polish unit in the area capable of undertaking such an operation. The Lithuanian police forces in Podbrzezie numbered about 100 men, well-armed. The Lithuanian unit expected retaliation, ordered the Lithuanian civilian population to evacuate, and entrenched itself in its station. Therefore, Szendzielarz decided on a different direction of attack, namely, into the territory of prewar Lithuania. Łupaszko informed his superior, the commander of the Home Army district, Aleksander Krzyżanowski “Wilk,” who was stationed in Dieveniškės, about the planned operation through a courier. Wilk categorically forbade carrying out the retaliation; however, this information did not reach Łupaszko, who by that time was already in Lithuania.

On 20 June 1944, the 3rd Company of the 258th Lithuanian Police Battalion murdered 39 Poles in Glinciszki, including women and children. Lithuanian collaborator units also harassed the Polish population in Pawłów, Adamowszczyzna, and Sieńkowszczyzna. In reprisal, on 23 June 1944, a unit of 5th Vilnian Home Army Brigade attacked the fortified village of Dubingiai, capturing a bunker defended by Lithuanian policemen. The order to attack the village was given by Szendzielarz. Dubingiai became the target of the attack due to many of the policemen, and their families, responsible for the Glinciszki crime living there. Having the list of people who collaborated with the occupier, the Poles began action to avenge the death of the residents of Glinciszki. According to historian Paweł Rokicki, the actions in Dubingiai were a war crime, and the deaths of the civilians were intentional. In Dubingiai between 21 and 27 inhabitants of the village died, including women and children.

==== Operation Ostra Brama (7–13 July 1944) ====
In August, the commander of all Home Army units in the Vilnius Region, Gen. Aleksander "Wilk" Krzyżanowski, ordered all six brigades under his command to prepare for Operation Tempest — a planned all-national rising against the German forces occupying Poland. In what became known as Operation Ostra Brama, the 5th Brigade was to attack the Vilnius suburb of Žvėrynas in cooperation with advancing units of the 3rd Belorussian Front. However, Łupaszko, for fear of being arrested with his units by the NKVD and killed on the spot, disobeyed orders and moved his unit to central Poland. Vilnius was occupied by Soviet troops with Polish aid. The Polish commander was then arrested by the Soviets and the majority of his men were sent to Gulags and sites of detention in the Soviet Union.

It is uncertain why Szendzielarz was not court-martialed for desertion. Most likely it was in fact General "Wilk" himself who ordered Łupaszko's unit away from the Wilno area, due to Łupaszko long having been involved in fighting with Soviet partisans and Wilk not wanting to provoke the Red Army. Łupaszko's unit remained in the forests and he decided to await the outcome of Russo-Polish talks held by the Polish government-in-exile. Meanwhile, the unit was reorganized and captured enough equipment to fully arm 600 men with machine guns and machine pistols.

== After World War II ==
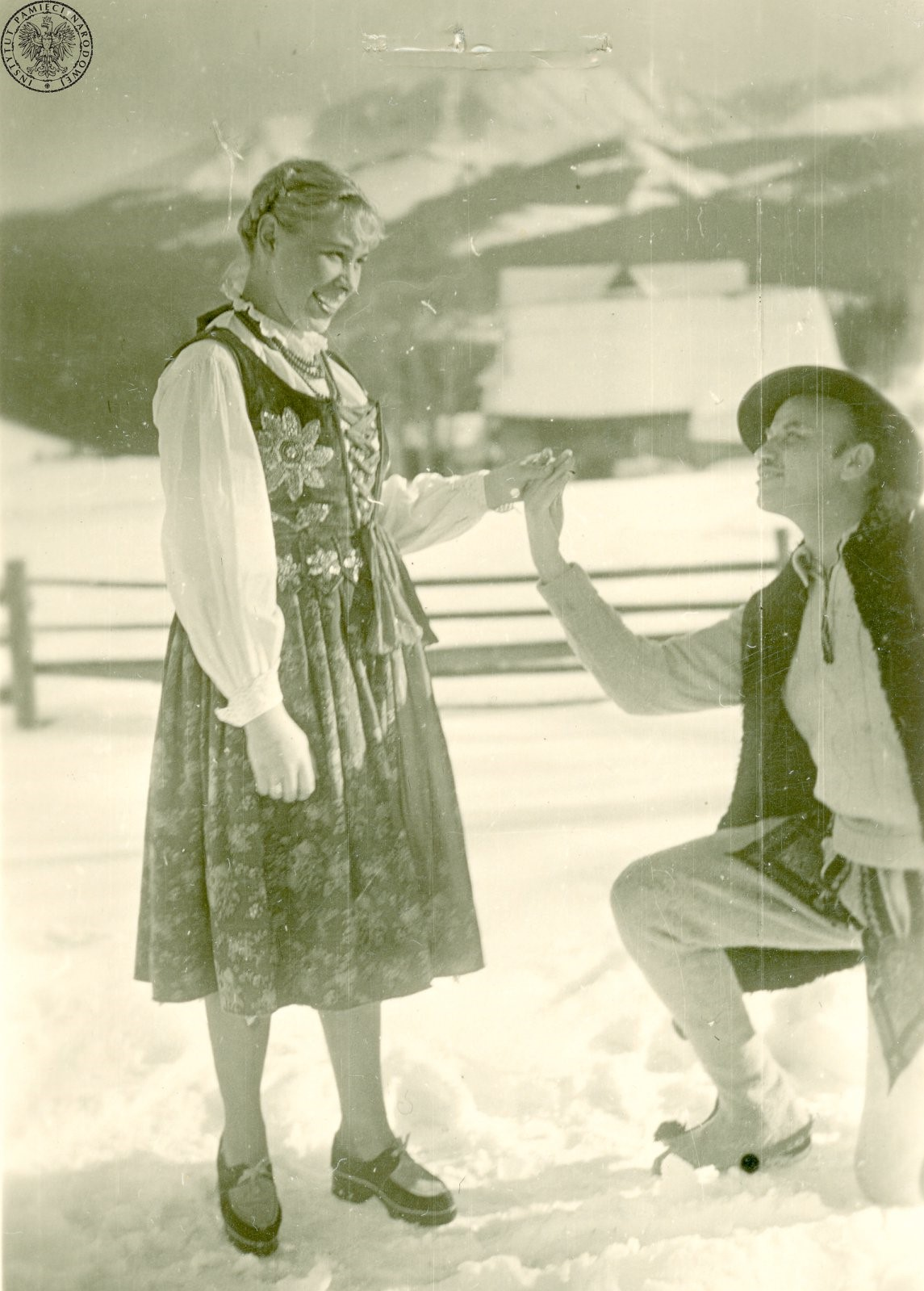
Lidia Lwow and Zygmunt Szendzielarz in 1948

After the governments of the United Kingdom and the United States broke the pacts with Poland and accepted the communist "Polish Committee of National Liberation" as the provisional government of Poland, Łupaszka restarted hostilities—this time against the new oppressor, in the ranks of Freedom and Independence Association. However, after several successful actions against the NKVD units in the area of Białowieża Forest, it became apparent that such actions would result in the total destruction of his unit.

In February 1945 his wife died and the nurse Lidia Lwow-Eberle became his partner.

In September 1945, Zygmunt Szendzielarz moved with a large part of his unit to Gdańsk-Oliwa, where he remained underground while preparing his unit for a new partisan offensive against the Soviet-backed communist authorities of Poland. On 14 April 1946 Szendzielarz finally mobilized his unit and headed for the Tuchola Forest, where he started operations against the forces of the Internal Security Corps, Security Office and the communist authorities. Łupaszko was hoping that in the spring of 1946 the former Western Allies of Poland would start a new war against the Soviet Union and that the Polish underground units could prove useful in liberating Poland. However, when he realized that no such war was planned he decided to disband his unit. He saw the further fight as a waste of blood of his men and decided to retire from the open fight against the communists.

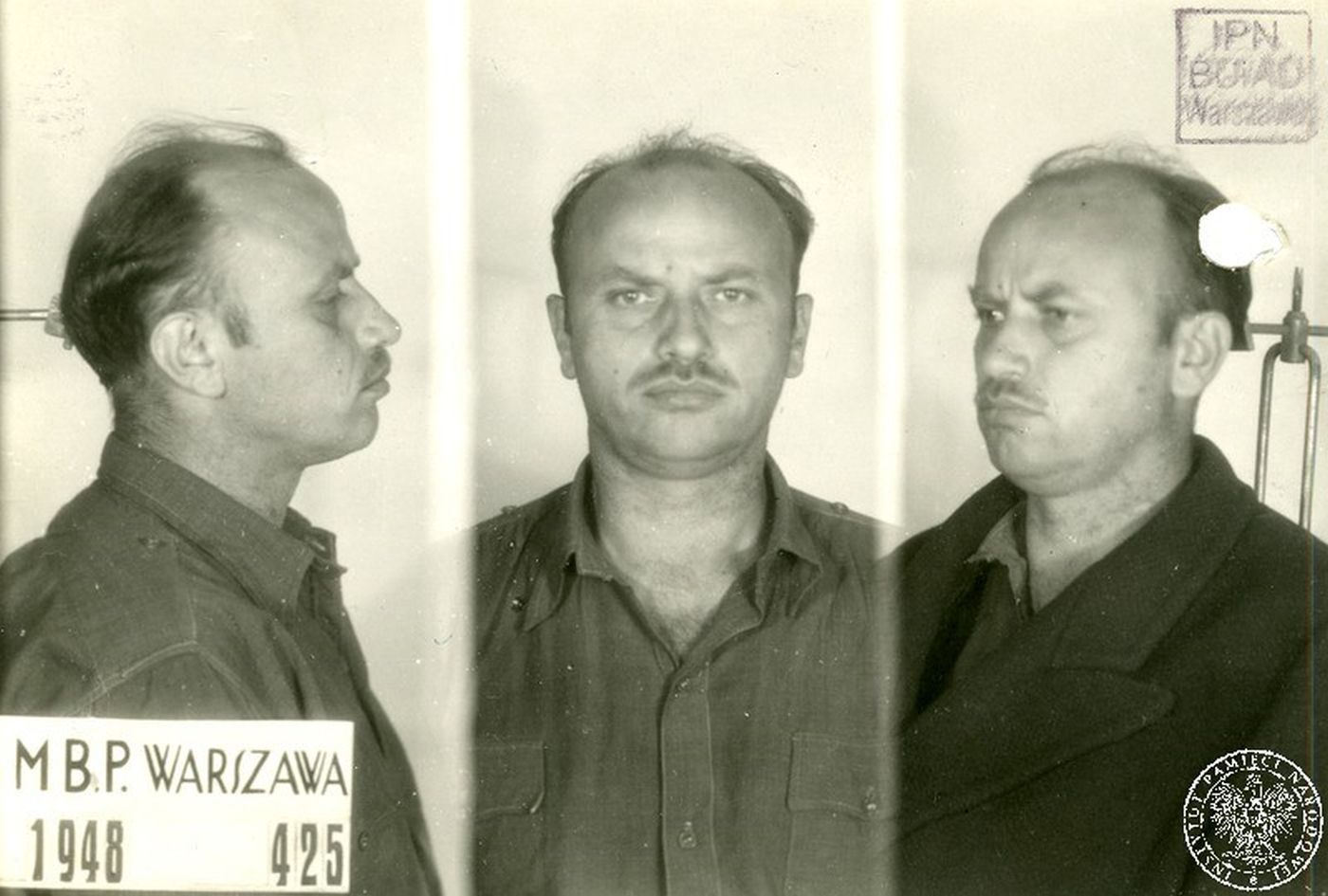
Photo after arrest 1948

After several years underground, he was arrested by the Security Office on 28 June 1948, in Osielec near Nowy Targ. After more than two years of brutal interrogation and torture in Warsaw's Mokotów Prison he was sentenced to death on 2 November 1950 by the Soviet-controlled court-martial in Warsaw. He was executed on 8 February 1951, together with several other Home Army soldiers. Szendzielarz was 40 years old. His body was buried in an undisclosed location. During a 2013 exhumation Szendzielarz's remains were recovered and identified as one of roughly 250 bodies buried in a mass grave at the Meadow at Warsaw's Powązki Military Cemetery.

== Crimes against humanity ==
Szendzielarz's unit massacred Lithuanian civilians in 1944. The victims of the 5th AK Brigade were primarily women and children (about 75% of all those killed). They were shot as a result of the deliberate action. During the Dubingiai massacre, there was no fight, in particular with the Lithuanian police, which simply was not there. Findings from the Polish Institute of National Remembrance (IPN) leave no doubt that the retaliatory action of the 5th Home Army Brigade was a war crime on civilians.

On 17 April 1945, Zygmunt Sendzielarz's unit once more massacred Belarusian civilians in the village of Narewka, Poland.

== Honours and awards ==
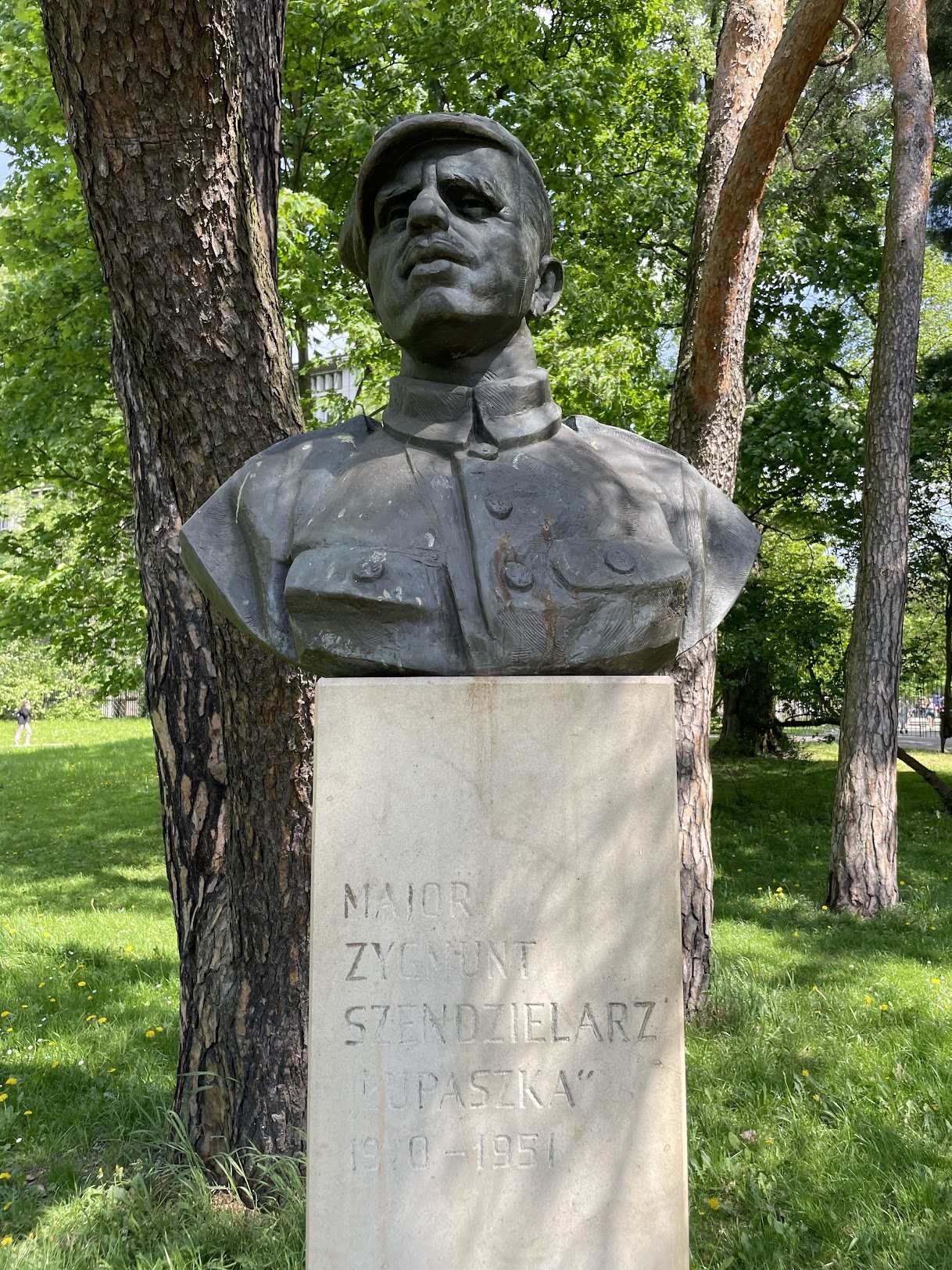
Bust of Zygmunt Szendzielarz sculpted by Wojciech Batko found in Henryk Jordan Park, Kraków

- Virtuti Militari, V class; for participation in the September 1939 campaign
- Cross of Valour (January 1944)
- Gold Cross, Virtuti Militari (25 June 1988) in recognition of outstanding deeds during the war
- Grand Cross of the Order of Polonia Restituta, awarded by Polish President Lech Kaczynski, 11 November 2007

== See also ==
- Paweł Jasienica
- List of Poles
- Danuta Siedzikówna
