= Muravanaya Ashmyanka =

Agrotown in Grodno Region, Belarus

Muravanaya Ashmyanka Мураваная Ашмянка (Belarusian)
- Agrotown
- Location within Belarus
- Coordinates: 54°27′37″N 25°46′55″E
- Country: Belarus
- Region: Grodno Region
- District: Ashmyany District

Population (2015)
  - Total: 415
- Time zone: UTC+3 (MSK)

Muravanaya Ashmyanka (Belarusian: Мураваная Ашмянка; Russian: Мурованая Ошмянка, romanized: Murovanaya Oshmyanka; Polish: Murowana Oszmianka; Lithuanian: Ašmenėlė) is an agrotown in Ashmyany District, Grodno Region, Belarus. It serves as the administrative center of Muravanaya Ashmyanka selsoviet. It is located 11 kilometres (6.8 mi) northwest from Ashmyany and 28 kilometres (17 mi) from the railway station Ashmyany. In 1999, there were 338 villagers and 134 dwellings. In 2009, it received the status of agrotown. As of 2015, it has a population of 415.

The village is the administrative center of the local rural council and collective farm, has a hospital and a high school. There still remains the ruined printing house, which was owned in beginning of the 17th century by Krzysztof Mikołaj Dorohostajski, and where Woiciech Salinarius's Censura was printed in 1615 (the brick building completed possibly in 1590, converted to the palace residence in the 19th century). There is also a Catholic church of Virgin Mary (wooden structure with a belltower, example of Baroque and Classicism and of folk wooden architecture; built in the end of the 18th — beginning of the 19th century, renewed in 1841 and 1874). During World War II (around May 1944) the village was the site of a battle between Polish resistance and Lithuanian auxiliary Local Lithuanian Detachment.

== Sources ==
- Belarusian Encyclopedia, Vol.11, 2000; Collection of Historical and Cultural Artifacts of Belarus, Hrodna Voblast volume, 1986.
- Andryyevich, U. U. (2015). Гарады і вёскі Беларусі Т. 9 кн. 1. Minsk: Беларуская Энцыклапедыя імя Петруся Броўкі. ISBN 978-985-11-0839-4.
