= Aleksander Krzyżanowski =

Polish army officer and partisan leader (1895–1951)

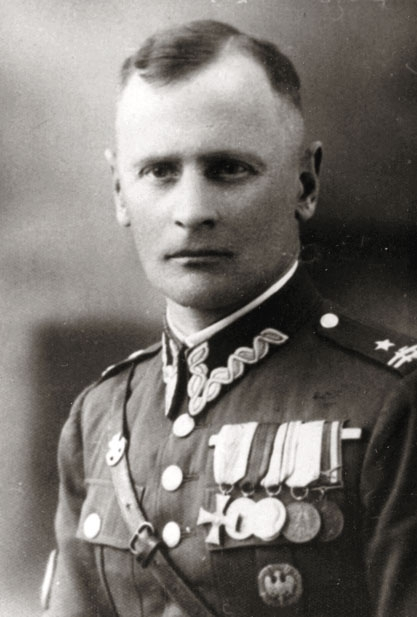
- Nicknames: "Wilk", "Wesołowski", "Dziemido", "Jan Kulczycki"
- Born: 18 February 1895; Bryansk, Russian Empire
- Died: 29 September 1951 (aged 56) Warsaw, Poland
- Allegiance: Russian Empire; Second Polish Republic; Home Army
- Service years: 1914-1944
- Rank: Colonel, Brigade general (after his death)
- Conflicts: World War I; Polish-Soviet War; Battle of Daugavpils; World War II; Battle of the Bzura; Battle of Murowana Oszmianka; Operation Tempest; Operation Ostra Brama

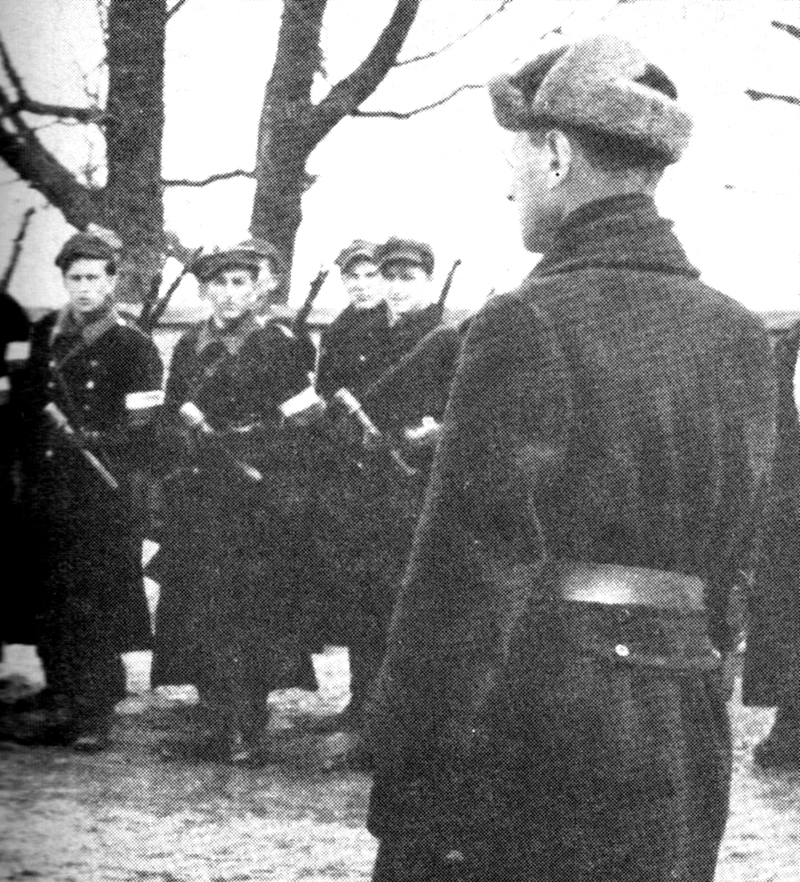
General Krzyżanowski "Wilk" with his soldiers in 1944

Aleksander Krzyżanowski nom de guerre "Wilk" (18 February 1895 – 29 September 1951) was an artillery colonel of the Polish Army, officer of the Service for Poland's Victory, Union of Armed Struggle, commander of the Vilnius District of the Home Army and political prisoner of the Stalinist period. In 1994 he was posthumously promoted to the rank of brigade general.

== World War I ==
Aleksander Krzyżanowski was born in Bryansk and was conscripted into the Russian Army during the First World War, where he specialized in artillery.

== Second Polish Republic ==
=== Polish-Soviet War ===
After Poland regained independence in 1918 he joined the Polish military, and took part in the Polish-Soviet War where he distinguished himself in 1919 receiving the Krzyż Walecznych medal, and in January 1920 he took part in the heavy fighting at the Battle of Daugavpils.

=== Interwar ===
During the interwar period in the Second Polish Republic he further continued his military career.

== World War II ==
=== Polish Defence War of 1939 ===
At the time of the Nazi invasion of Poland (1 September 1939) he was commanding the 26th Regiment of Light Artillery, of the 26th Infantry Division, part of the Poznań Army under general Tadeusz Kutrzeba. His unit was destroyed during the Battle of the Bzura.

=== Resistance ===
Soon after occupation he organized a partisan unit at Świętokrzyskie Mountains, however, after this unit was defeated by the Germans, he went to Warsaw by late October, joining the first Polish resistance organization, the Service for Poland's Victory. In November, he was assigned to Vilnius, which was at the time occupied by the Soviet Union according to the Molotov–Ribbentrop Pact. The SZP was transformed into Związek Walki Zbrojnej. When in April 1941 Soviet NKVD arrested the commander of the ZWP in the Vilnius region, general Nikodem Sulik, Krzyżanowski de facto replaced him, with his position being officially confirmed by general Stefan Rowecki in August. In 1942 ZWP was transformed into Armia Krajowa (AK).

Krzyżanowski attempted to build a larger anti-German coalition, hence opening negotiations with representatives of the Lithuanian and Belarusian resistance, which were fruitless, also issuing explicit orders that no ethnic group, including Jews, should be mistreated. He also opened negotiations with the representatives of the Lithuanian and Belarusian resistance but they were fruitless. The negotiations with the Soviets initially led nowhere as well. The Soviet Union ultimately aimed to regain the control of the area it had in 1939 from Germany and Joseph Stalin's aim to ensure that an independent Poland would never reemerge in the postwar period. The relationship between the Soviets and Sikorski's Polish government in exile, formally a commanding force of the AK, was strained at best, especially in the wake of the evidence of the mass execution of the Polish POW officers by the Soviets at Katyn which was discovered in 1943.

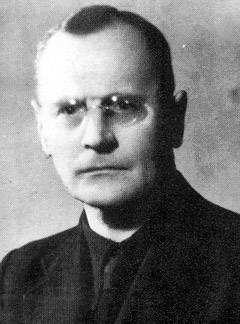
Aleksander Krzyżanowski in civil wear

As Soviet partisans were ordered to liquidate Polish Home Army units, so the local AK commanders considered the Soviets as just another enemy. As ordered by Moscow on 22 June 1943, the Soviet partisans in Poland started an open fight both against the German forces as well as the local Polish partisans.

==== Collaboration with the Germans ====
In January and February 1944, in the wake of the massive assault by the Soviet paramilitary against the Polish AK resistance units Krzyżanowski conducted a series of negotiations with the Germans. In the aftermath of talks with Seidler for Rosenfield of the Nazi German Security Service near Wilejka and Julian Christiansen, the Chief of the Vilnius Abwehr, cooperation between Germans and the AK was agreed upon in the area of Krzyżanowski's units' operation and, according to the report of the local Nazi official:

"three sizeable Polish detachments came over to our side and initially also fought well."

While Krzyżanowski refused to sign an explicit agreement on cooperation, the secret arrangement was made that the AK would "capture" the armaments and provisions left to them by Germans. As a result, the AK units in the area were re-supplied.

The Germans pulled off their mobilization plans locally (leaving the territory for the AK's mobilization campaign) and largely withdrew. The German spies and agents were spared by the AK members and no AK members were executed by Germans in their reprisals against the local population. However any such arrangements were purely tactical, in contrast to the ideological collaboration as shown by the Vichy regime in France, the Quisling regime in Norway or closer to the region, the Organization of Ukrainian Nationalists. The Poles' main motivation was to gain intelligence on German morale, preparedness and to acquire some badly needed weapons. There are no known joint Polish-German actions, with the German attempts to turn the Poles toward fighting exclusively against the Soviets being unsuccessful. The collaboration of local commanders with the Germans was atypical, and condemned by AK High Command.

==== Fighting with the Lithuanians ====
In May 1944 Polish resistance units were attacked by the Lithuanian Territorial Defense Force under General Povilas Plechavičius. Krzyżanowski attempted to negotiate, but Plechavičius demanded that AK and all Polish partisans were to retreat from the Vilnius region or accept Lithuanian sovereignty over that territory. Krzyżanowski would not agree to such a withdrawal and the fighting escalated, eventually culminating in the Polish victory over the Lithuanian collaborationist forces in the battle of Murowana Oszmianka of May 13-May 14. After that battle Krzyżanowski attempted to resume negotiations but was ignored by the Lithuanian side. The increasing hostilities culminated in June, when Lithuanian pro-Nazi Lithuanian Security Police forces, which had recently suffered a loss of several members in a skirmish with AK, massacred 37 Polish civilians in Glinciszki, a village known to support the Polish partisans. Krzyżanowski ordered his forces to increase the activity against the Lithuanians in retribution and, according to the accounts published in Lithuania, his forces conducted a multitude of actions against the Lithuanian civil population. It is unclear whether he was aware of the Dubingiai incident, in which an AK unit massacred a number of Lithuanian civilians (the number of victims has been estimated at 27.

==== Operation Tempest ====
Beginning in the spring of 1944, the Polish underground was preparing for Operation Tempest, which was designed to cause a large scale uprising behind the German lines to prevent the Soviet takeover of the territory by establishing a local Polish administration before the Soviet's arrival, as a sign to the entire world that the Polish government in exile commanded significant Polish forces. Operation Tempest would also support the Soviet Eastern Front offensive. In June Krzyżanowski and his subordinates prepared Operation Ostra Brama. On 2 July 1944, he gave orders to begin the operation on the 7 July, although because of the Soviet quick advance the operation was put into effect one day early (on 6 July).

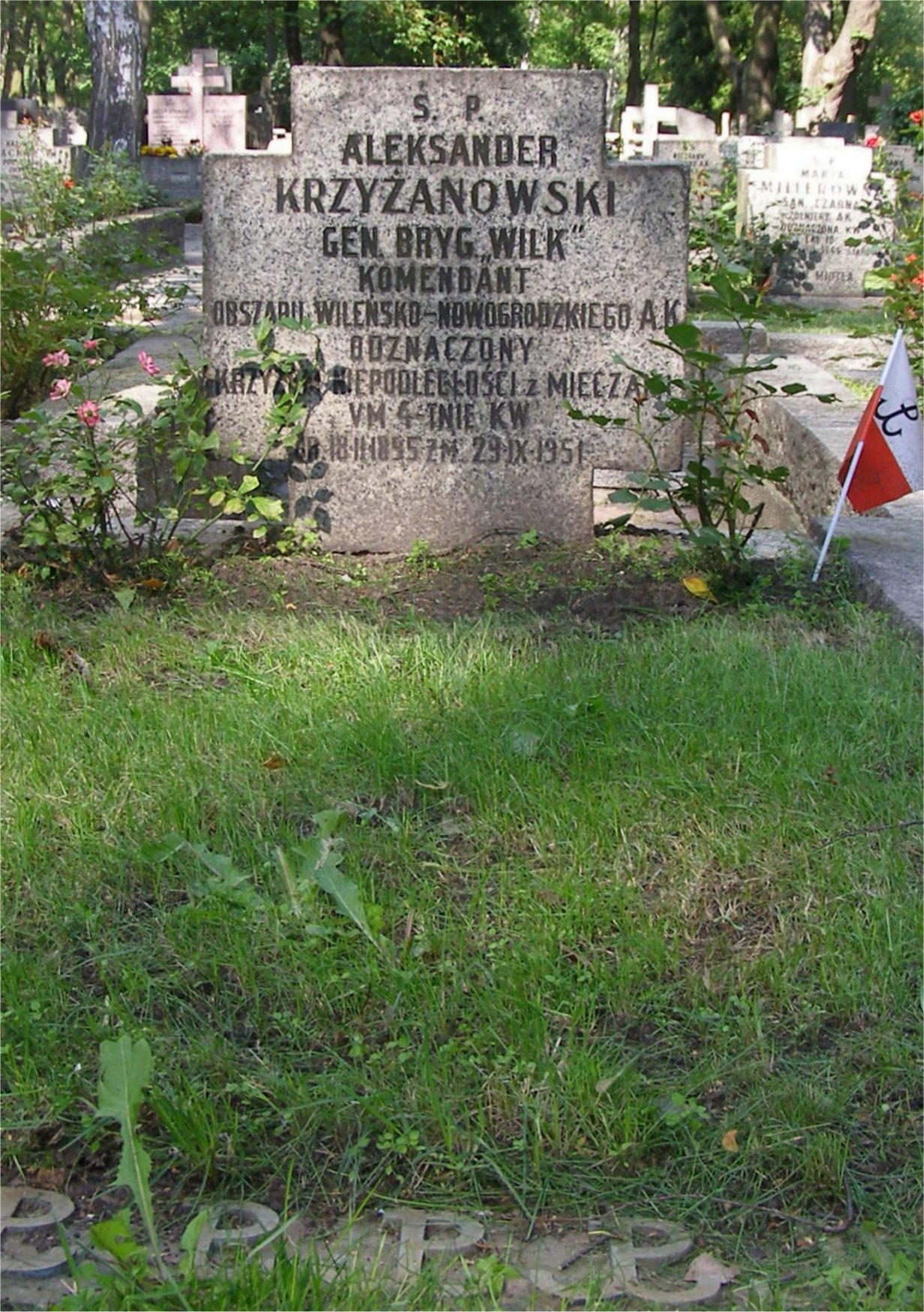
The grave of Aleksander Krzyżanowski

Largely in the effect of the German-AK relationship in the area, only a third of the available AK force took part in the operation against the Nazis. Ultimately, the Polish forces had to cooperate with the Soviets to secure Wilno. After the Poles and Soviets defeated the Germans on 17 July 1944, Polish officers, including Krzyżanowski, who had been invited to a debriefing with the Soviets, were arrested and imprisoned.

== After World War II ==
Krzyżanowski was in prison until 1947. In August 1947 he escaped but was quickly re-arrested when he approached a Polish official who worked for the Polish communists. He was repatriated to Poland in October 1947. He did not support any secret resistance against the Soviets, like Freedom and Independence, arguing that it was pointless in the face of Soviet numerical superiority and the Western betrayal, but he remained in contact with many of his former subordinates. He was however still viewed as a danger to the state by the Polish communist regime and was arrested in 1948 by the secret police, Urząd Bezpieczeństwa. In prison, his health deteriorated, and he died from tuberculosis on 29 September 1951.

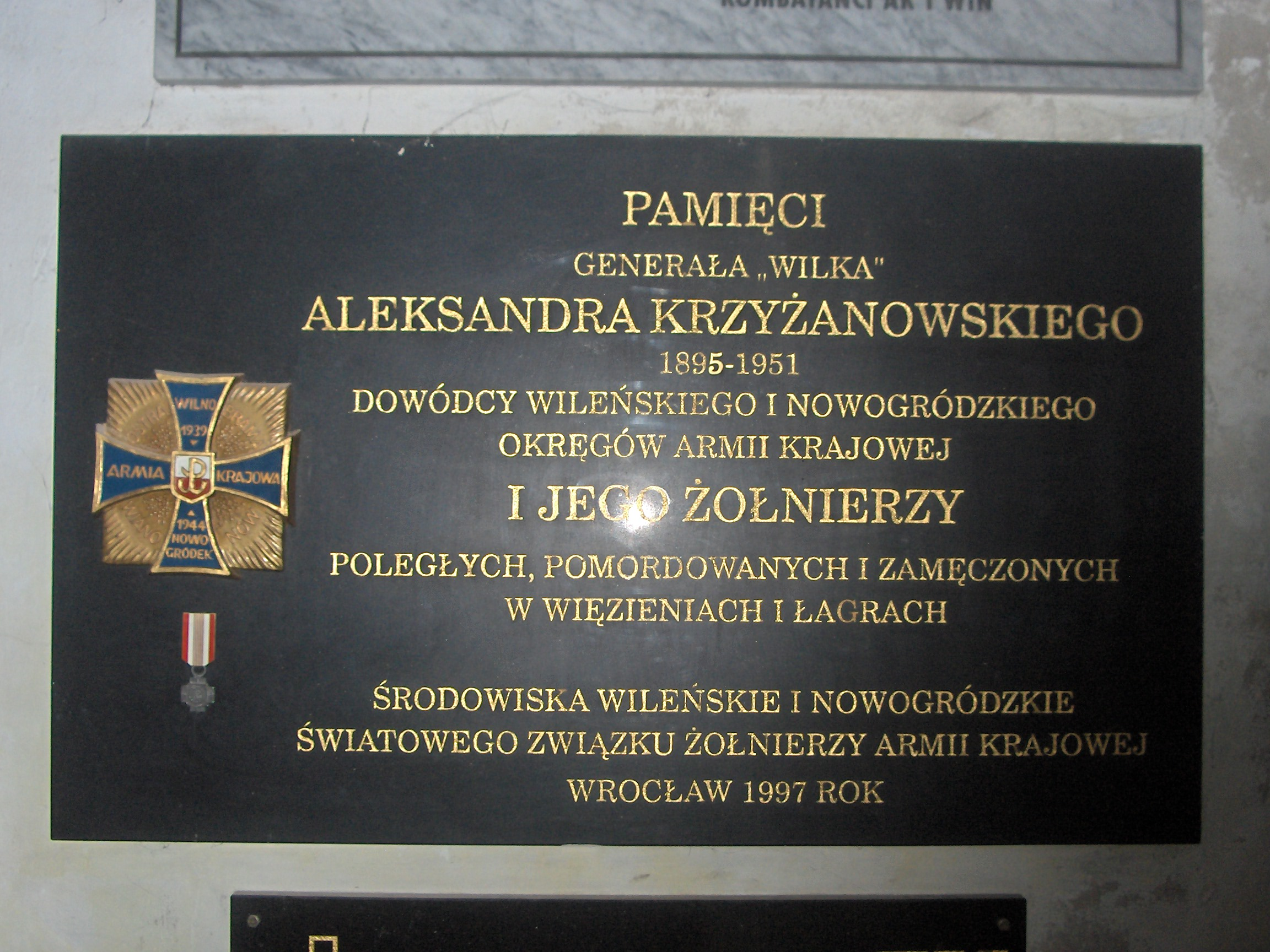
Commemorative plaque dedicated to general Aleksander Krzyżanowski "Wilk" and soldiers of the Home Army

== Posthumous ==
He was buried in an unmarked grave, but in the wake of destalinization in 1957, his body was exhumed and buried in the Powązki Military Cemetery.

In 1994 he was posthumously promoted to the rank of brigade general.

== See also ==
- Maciej Kalenkiewicz
- Belarusian partisans
- Polish partisans

== Notes and references ==
Sources

- Short biography
