= Battle of Murowana Oszmianka =

Part of Operation Tempest in the WWII Eastern Front

- Part of Polish–Lithuanian relations during World War II
Date	13–14 May 1944
Location	Murowana Oszmianka and Tołminowo 54°27′28″N 25°46′43″E
Result	Polish victory

Belligerents
Polish Underground State (Home Army)	(Lithuania) Lithuanian Territorial Defense Force

Commanders and leaders
Czesław Dębicki	Povilas Grigaliunas; Eduardas Počebutas †

Units involved
5 Home Army partisan brigades: 3rd Brigade; 8th Brigade; 9th Brigade; 12th Brigade; 13th Brigade	Lithuanian Territorial Defense Force: 301st Battalion (elements)

Strength
~ 600 strong	~ 750 strong

Casualties and losses
13-15 killed, 6-25 wounded	50-70 killed, 60-130 wounded, 150-300 taken prisoner (the rest escaped); Total:260-500

The Battle of Murowana Oszmianka of 13–14 May 1944 was the largest clash between the Polish resistance movement organization Home Army (Armia Krajowa, AK) and the Lithuanian Territorial Defense Force (LTDF); a Lithuanian volunteer security force subordinated to Nazi Germany occupational administration. The battle took place in and near the village of Murowana Oszmianka in Generalbezirk Litauen, part of the Reichskommissariat Ostland. The outcome of the battle was that the 301st LTDF battalion was routed and the entire force was disbanded by the Germans soon afterwards due to its members refusing to take an oath to Hitler and be subordinate to German commanders.

== Prelude ==
In late April and early May 1944, the German authorities decided to transfer a significant part of the police duties in Lithuania to the newly created LTDF formation, which was ordered to initiate a wide anti-partisan operation against the Polish and Soviet partisans in the area. Three Lithuanian battalions were dispatched to man garrisons in and around the town of Ašmena. However, the battalions were dispersed into companies on the orders of the SS.

The AK commander for the Vilnius Region Aleksander "Wilk" Krzyżanowski mobilized the region's partisan troops in response, but they were ordered not to engage the German allied LTDF in order to prevent the escalation of Polish-Lithuanian hostilities. According to Povilas Plechavičius,

While sending the battalions to the Vilnius region, it was secretly ordered to the battalion commanders to avoid engagements with already existing Polish partisans, because it was not in our interest to fight or destroy them. I ordered publicly that [LTDF] should behave in a knightly fashion with the local inhabitants, regardless of their spoken language.

The Lithuanian troops, however, satisfied by their perceived superiority, started suppressing the local Polish communities suspected of harboring the anti-Nazi partisans; numerous war crimes were committed by the LTDF, notably atrocities against Polish civilians in Paulava, Graužiškės and Sieńkowszczyzna. Faced with the need to protect Polish civilians, the AK decided to fight back in early May, and organized a concentrated assault against the fortified Lithuanian positions around the village of Murowana Oszmianka. On 10 May, AK units were ordered to prepare an assault against one of the larger LTDF units in the region.

== Plan ==
Major Czesław Dębicki "Jarema" was chosen to be the commander of the five AK brigades (the 3rd, 8th, 9th, 12th and 13th) that were to attack the LTDF positions in Murowana Oszmianka. The AK reconnaissance perceived that their enemy's strength was four companies in Murowana Oszmianka (site of the local Lithuanian headquarters), two companies in Tołominowo, and a strong German garrison (with armored elements) in Oszmiany. The strength and quality of the enemy's forces were ascertained to be superior by about 150 men, and created the need for a surprise attack, which was vital for the Polish plan and ultimate Polish victory.

On 12 May a detailed plan was created. It called for:

- 4 platoons of the 8th brigade to attack Murowana Oszmianka from the south-east, converging on the church;
- The 3rd brigade would attack Murowana Oszmianka from the north-west;
- The 13th brigade would secure the Murowana Oszmianka-Tołominowo road, possibly attack Tołominowo, and prevent cooperation between the enemy's forces;
- The 9th brigade would secure the Murowana Oszmianka-Oszmiany road;
- The Oszmiana-Murowana Oszmianka bridge would be blown up to prevent German armor from engaging in what became a significant Polish victory;
- Communication lines between Wilno-Oszmiana would be cut off;
- The 12th brigade and remaining cavalry platoon of the 8th brigade would be held in reserve;
- A field hospital would be established in the village of Wasiowce;
- Positions would be taken at dusk; all units would disengage by dawn to avoid a counterattack by the German Luftwaffe;
- The assault would begin at 11pm

== The battle ==
On the night of 13 May the 3rd Brigade of the AK assaulted the village from the west and north-west, while the 8th and 12th Brigades attacked from the south and east. The remainder of the Polish forces (13th and 9th Brigades) secured the Murowana Oszmianka-Tołminowo road. The defences, reinforced with concrete bunkers and trenches, were manned by elements of the 301st (1st and 2nd company) of the LTDF. This detachment was already wavering following a defeat at Graużyszki on 5 May, where they were dispersed by the 8th and 12th Brigades of the Home Army and suffered 47 casualties. The assault was a success, partially because other Lithuanian garrisons in nearby towns did not move from their posts; German reinforcements were stopped by sabotage of bridges and delaying actions (carried out primarily by the 9th Brigade).

The 3rd company of the 301st battalion was also engaged in the vicinity of the nearby Tołominowo village by the 13th Brigade. This engagement also ended with a decisive Polish victory. During the battle Lithuanian commander Eduardas Počebutas was killed by the Poles.

== Aftermath ==
During the battles in Murowana Oszmianka and Tołminowo, the 301st battalion was practically wiped out; only the 4th company managed to evade Polish forces and retreat. The LTDF lost at least 50 men, with 60 more wounded and more than 300 taken prisoner of war (117 Lithuanians in Tołminowo). After the battle, all Lithuanian prisoners of war were disarmed (the Polish resistance was able to capture one mortar and seven machine guns) and released with only their long johns and helmets on. The Lithuanian officers were given letters from the Vilnius region AK commander, Aleksander "Wilk" Krzyżanowski, addressed to the LTDF commander, General Povilas Plechavičius, appealing for a stop to Lithuanian-Nazi German collaboration, an end to Lithuanian anti-Polish policies and a joint effort to combat the Germans; in response, Lithuanians demanded that the Poles either abandon the Vilnius Region (disputed between Poles and Lithuanians) or subordinate themselves to the Lithuanians in their struggle against the Soviets, when the Polish did not agree to any option, Lithuanians refused to cooperate with them.

After their defeat in the battle of Murowana Oszmianka and other skirmishes against the Home Army, the LTDF became so weakened that Povilas Plechavičius and his officers were judged to be useless by the Germans and were relieved of command. Soon afterwards, they were arrested and their unit dissolved.

== See also ==
- Lithuanian Territorial Defense Force
- German occupation of Lithuania during World War II
- German occupation of Byelorussia during World War II
