= Belmontas =

Suburb of Vilnius, Lithuania

Coordinates: 54°40′52″N 25°19′16″E

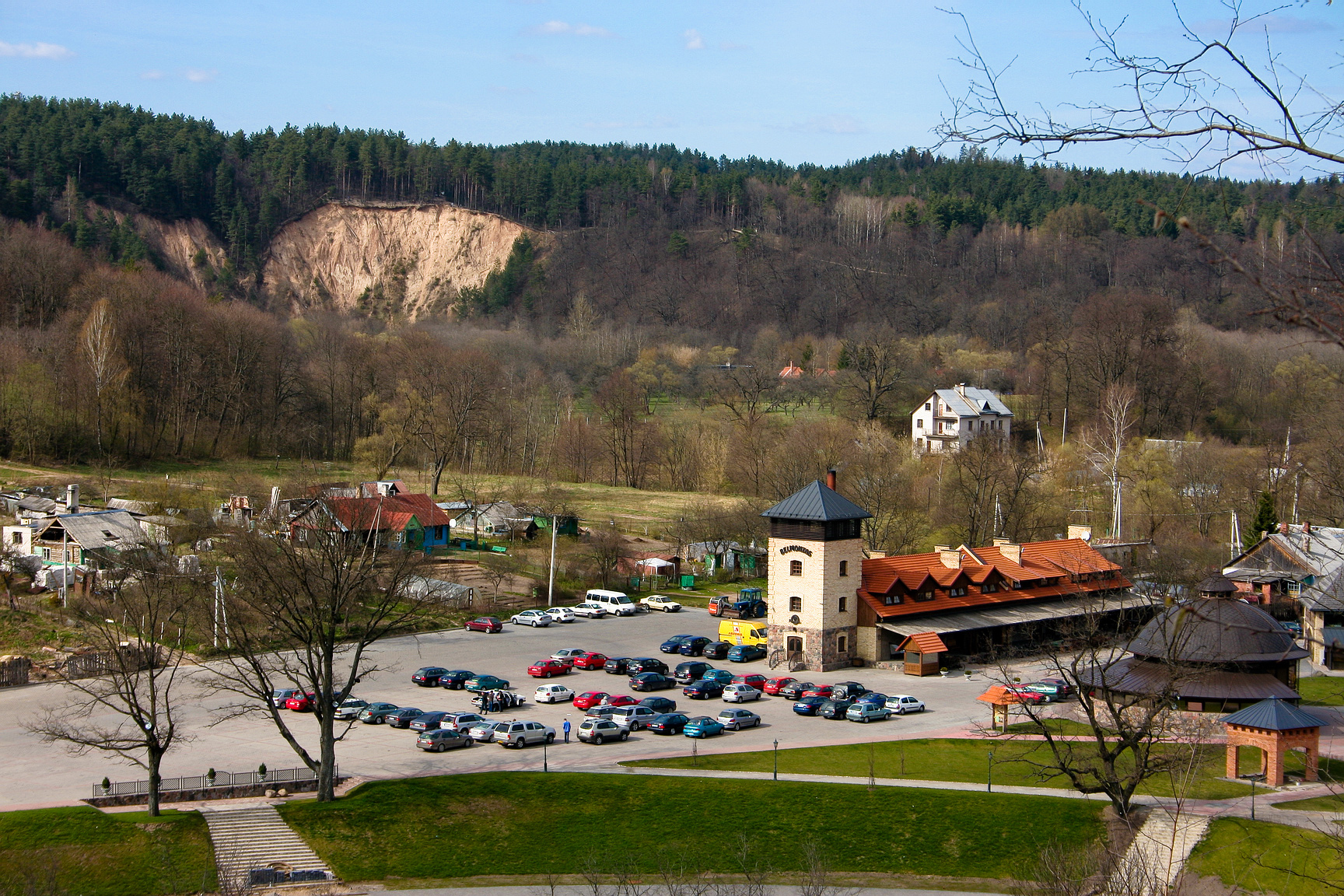
Modern view of the former Belmont mill

Belmontas (originally Belmont) is a suburb of Vilnius. It is located in the area of Rasos, on the right bank of Vilnia River, to the east of Užupis.

Originally a clearing in the woods surrounding the city of Vilna, it belonged to the municipal artillery units, along with the nearby cannon foundry (modern Pūčkoriai). In the 19th century a French emigrant built a flour mill on the spot and named it Belmont, possibly after one of several locations named Belmont in France. Abandoned, the mill was rebuilt in the early 2000s as a tourist attraction, a restaurant and a hotel.
