= Operation Ostra Brama =

WWII battle

- Part of Operation Tempest in the Eastern Front of World War II
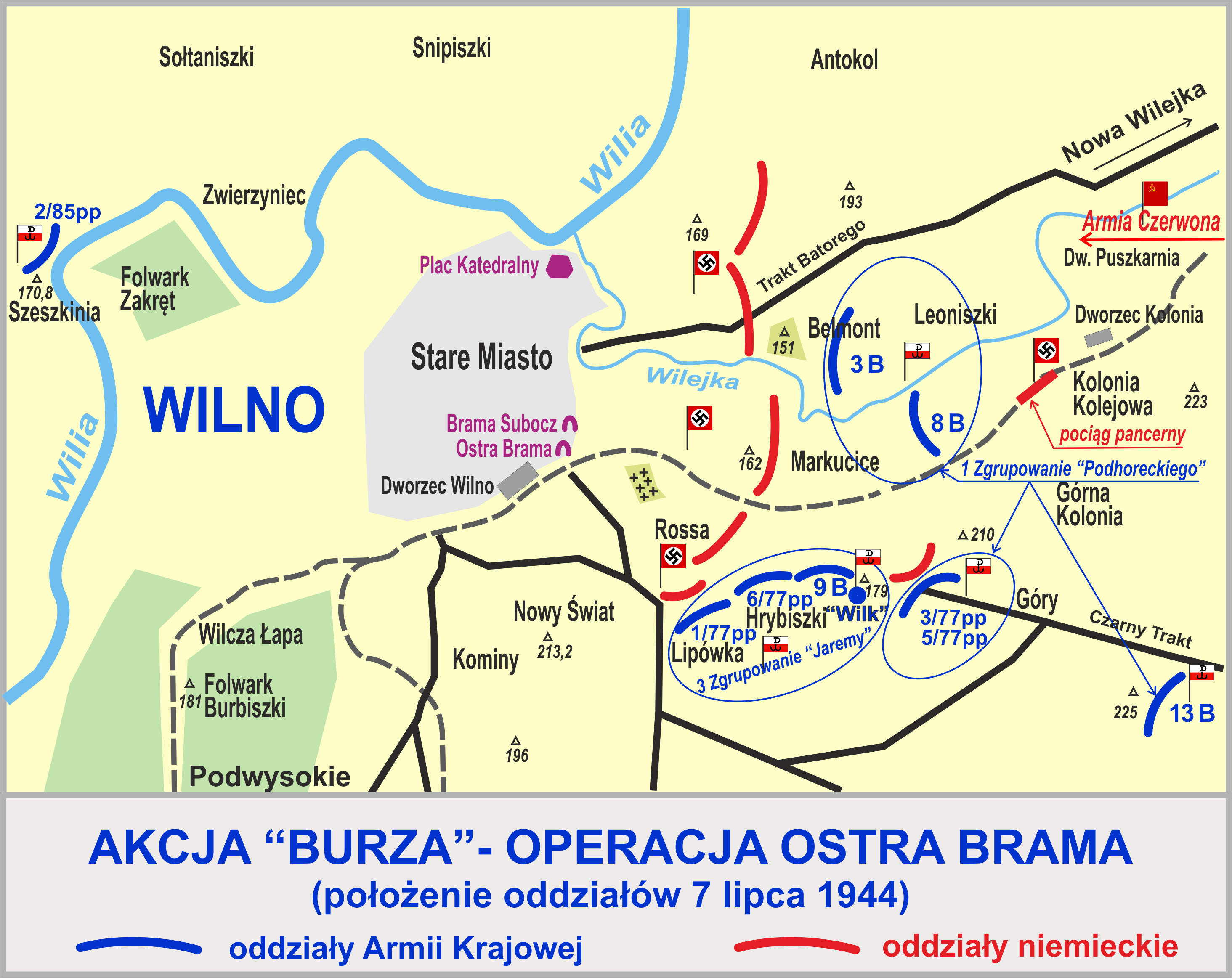
- Dislocation of Polish and German units at the start of the fighting.
Date	7–13 July 1944
Location	Vilnius, present-day Lithuania (1922–1939 Polish: Wilno, Second Polish Republic) 54°41′N 25°19′E
Result	Operation failed
Territorial changes	Soviet occupation of Vilnius since July 13

Belligerents
Polish Underground State: Home Army	Germany

Commanders and leaders
Aleksander Krzyżanowski; Antoni Olechnowicz; Czesław Dębicki; Mieczysław Potocki	Reiner Stahel

Strength
~6,000 – 9,000	Existing troops, plus 17,700 as reinforcements

Operation Ostra Brama (Polish: Operacja „Ostra Brama”, lit. 'Operation Sharp Gate') was the Polish Home Army's attempted takeover of Vilnius (Polish: Wilno) in wake of the German Wehrmacht's evacuation, ahead of the approaching Soviet Red Army's Vilnius offensive. A part of a Polish national uprising, Operation Tempest, the action happened on 7–13 July 1944. The operation's main goal was propagandistic – to claim Vilnius for Poland by retaking it before Soviet arrival. Despite the operation's failure, the Polish government-in-exile continued its political line that led to the catastrophic Warsaw Uprising on 1 August 1944.

== Background ==
=== June 1944: Plans for uprising ===
On June 12, General Tadeusz Bór-Komorowski, Commander-in-Chief of the Home Army, ordered the preparation of a plan to seize Vilnius from German hands. The Home Army's Vilnius and Nowogródek districts planned to conquer the city before the Soviets did. Lieutenant Colonel Aleksander Krzyżanowski, who commanded the Home Army's Vilnius District, regrouped all the region's partisan units for the assault, both from inside and outside of the city.

Operation Ostra Brama was meant to be carried out during an expected state of confusion among German units in Vilnius, faced with the impending arrival of major Soviet forces. Instead, the Germans held strong positions in the fortified city. On June 26, major Teodor Cetys and lieutenant colonel Zygmunt Blumski proposed a plan to Krzyżanowski. 'Ostra Brama order number 1' comprised an overall outline for an assault on Vilnius, where the Home Army forces of the combined districts Vilnius and Nowogródek would strike from the outside under the lead of Lieutenant Colonel "Poleszczuk".

Units inside the city were under the command of Lieutenant Colonel Lubosław Krzeszowski "Ludwik". According to the plan, the main attack was prepared from the east and southeast for July 8. When the Red Army crossed the front, equivalent to where it was in 1916 (between Soly and Smarhon), the uprising would begin.

=== Allied diplomacy before the battle ===
Poland had already lost its eastern territories to Stalin at the Tehran Conference, but none of the Polish soldiers that were going to fight in the Battle of Vilnius knew about it. However, the Polish government-in-exile knew fully about the Western Allies' support for the Soviet position. For example, on April 25, 1944, during a meeting of British Prime Minister Churchill with Zygmunt Berezowski, a leading member of the Polish National Party, and General Stanisław Tatar, the deputy chief of staff of the Home Army.

"He [Berezowski] said that the Poles trusted Great Britain and her Prime Minister and counted on his staunch and firm support in ensuring Poland's real independence and the integrity of her frontiers. Churchill said that while he was willing to assist Poland in regaining her independence he could not vouch for the integrity of her frontiers; he reaffirmed his support for the Curzon Line, surrendering Wilno and Lwów to Russia and compensating Poland in the West. Berezowski responded with an emphatic re-statement of Poland's determination to keep Wilno and Lwów, and if necessary to fight for them. Churchill answered 'in a grave,...even...gloomy, manner: "Obviously, a decision to resist, regardless of the consequences, is the privilege of every nation, and it cannot be denied even to the weakest..."".'

Similar statements were received by the head of the Polish government-in-exile Stanisław Mikołajczyk during his visit to the United States in June 1944 and meeting with President Roosevelt.

"He [Roosevelt] assured Mikołajczyk that he could rely on 'the moral support' of Washington in his efforts to reach an understanding with Moscow.(6) He explained that he had, at Teheran, given Stalin the reasons why he could not join any 'detailed discussion' on Poland, and suggested to Mikolajczyk that 'he might be able to be of further assistance later on'.

Moral support and no more, but Mikołajczyk wrongly concluded from Roosevelt's words that the Curzon line as the basis of the Polish-Soviet border was Churchill's proposal that Roosevelt does not support it.

== Prelude ==
Because the Soviets approached the city faster than expected, Krzyżanowski launched the operation one day sooner. On paper, he commanded between 10,000 and 15,000 partisan troops that were relatively well-armed; many had prior combat experience. The timely mobilisation for the battle for Vilnius proved a challenge, however. Some of Krzyżanowski's forces were diverted elsewhere or located tens of kilometers outside the city. Marching Polish columns encountered German forces evacuating Vilnius, leading to skirmishes along the way. Altogether, only 4,000 to 5,000 tired soldiers were assembled outside the city by midnight of July 6 / 7. The units involved in this attack included four brigades and five battalions as well as the city's Home Army units.

Meanwhile, the German positions inside Vilnius had been fortified and augmented by security and police troops as the city, an important transportation hub, was designated a fortress. Most importantly, the Germans had expected the Polish attack for days, denying the Home Army the element of surprise.

The Polish units that did not participate in the attack on the city fought instead at Maišiagala, Kraučiūnai, and Eišiškės. In Kraučiūnai, the "Węgielny" group battled with the retreating German Vilnius garrison and the relief force. Some units like the Zygmunt Szendzielarz's 5th Brigade moved to the Białystok region.

== Operation ==
The Polish attack on the morning of July 7 stalled almost immediately under heavy fire from German positions.

=== Arrival of the Soviet forces ===
At mid-day, the first armoured units of the 3rd Belorussian Front appeared on the battlefield. From then on, until the battle concluded on July 13, Polish troops fought on the Soviet side. The Wehrmacht forces under Generalleutnant Reiner Stahel attempted to break out, although only a small group reached the German lines. On July 13, the German garrison's remnants surrendered.

== Aftermath ==
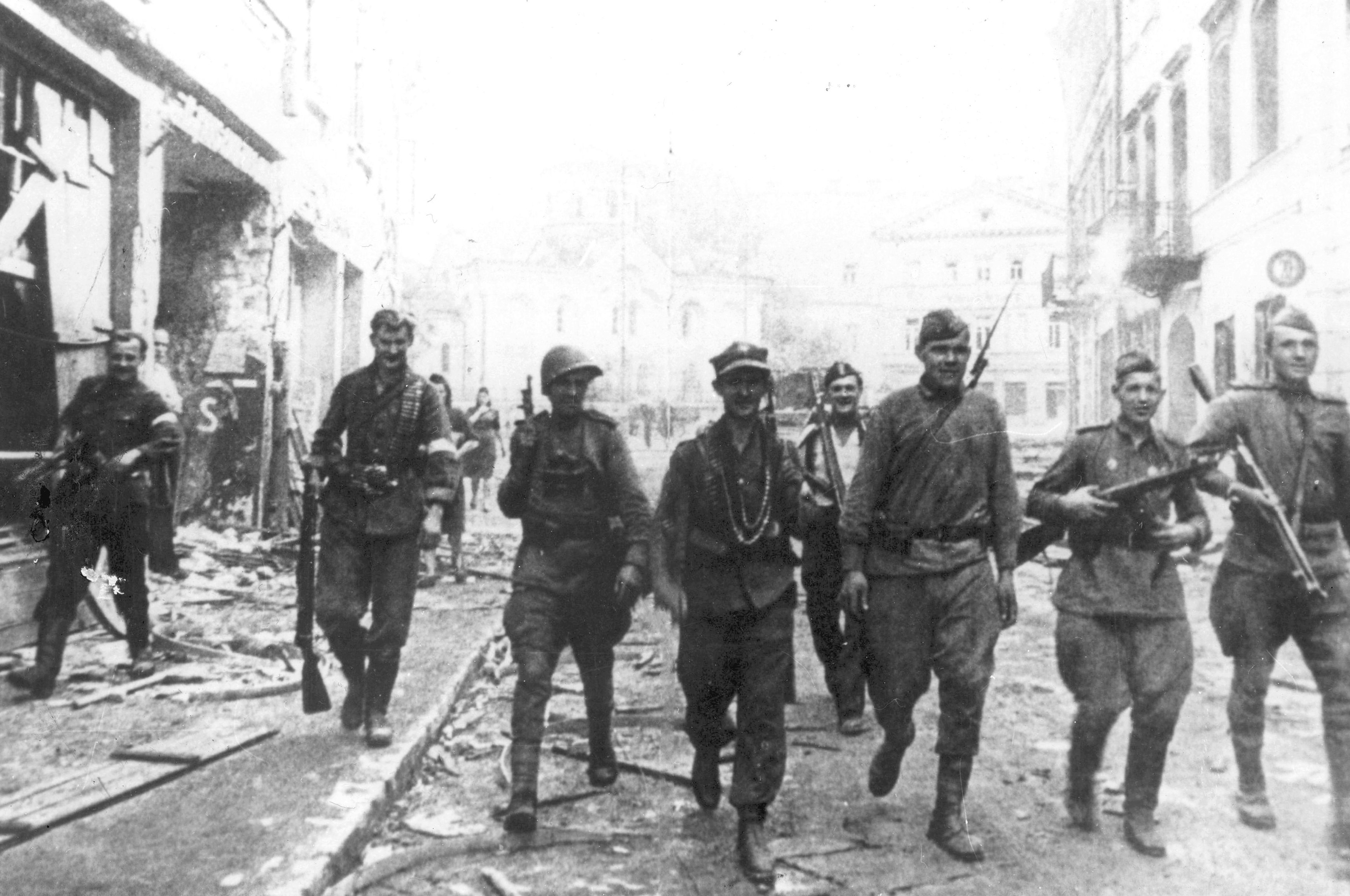
Soviet and Home Army soldiers patrolling Vilnius' streets on 12 July 1944. Despite Polish military aid to the city's Soviet occupiers, the Soviet NKVD arrested and interned the Polish officers on July 16.

=== July 13–15 ===
When the battle was over, the Soviet Command demanded that Polish soldiers immediately abandon Vilnius. The Polish commander, Colonel Krzyżanowski ordered Polish units to set off for the Rūdninkai forest, while he went to the headquarters of General Ivan Chernyakhovsky, commander of the 3rd Belorussian Front. The Soviets promised Krzyżanowski that the Polish would be supplied with equipment without any political conditions.

=== Soviet arrests and deportations ===
On July 16, Krzyżanowski was once again invited to Chernyakhovsky's headquarters to sign an agreement. However, this time, the Soviets arrested Krzyżanowski and his chief of staff, Major Teodor Cetys, as well as other Polish representatives at the same time in Bogusze. The wave of arrests also included the delegates of Polish government-in-exile in London.

The replacement commanders of the Vilnius and Nowogródek districts, Lieutenant Colonels Zygmunt Blumski, and Janusz Prawdzic-Szlaski, respectively, moved their units into the Rūdninkai forest under constant fire from Soviet aircraft. Those Polish soldiers that successfully reached the forests were ordered to make their way to Grodno, Białystok, or disperse into the local terrain. The Soviets eagerly hunted for the soldiers of what officially was their ally, capturing over 5,700 Polish soldiers.

On July 17, the Home Army units concentrated near Vilnius were disarmed, the soldiers were imprisoned in the camp in Medininkai. On July 27–28, they were deported to Kaluga. The officers were sent to Ryazan.

Stripped of their officers and confused, by July 18, roughly 6,000 soldiers and over 5,000 volunteers had withdrawn to the forests near Vilnius. The Soviets gradually encircled and captured them.

A few decided to join General Zygmunt Berling's First Polish Army, while most were forced into the Soviet Red Army. Those refusing to swear allegiance to the Soviet Union were deported to Kaluga, in western Russia. There, they became part of the infamous Gulag, the prisoner slave labor system then widespread in the Soviet Union, until their general release in 1947.

=== Western cover-up ===
None of what happened in Vilnius was disclosed to the general public in the West. Great Britain and the United States, which were the Soviet Union's wartime allies, were disinterested in revealing any news contradicting the impression that the Soviet Union was liberating Europe from Nazi evil. Indeed, British media censored stories about Soviet actions by decree of Minister of Information Brendan Bracken.

== Sources ==
- Borodziej, Włodzimierz (2006). "The Dress Rehearsal: Lwów, Lublin, Vilnius". The Warsaw uprising of 1944. University of Wisconsin Press. ISBN 9780299207304.
- Ciechanowski, Jan M. (1974). The Warsaw Rising of 1944. Soviet and East European studies. Great Britain: Cambridge University Press. ISBN 0521202035. LCCN 73-79315.
- Encyklopedia PWN (2023). ""Ostra Brama"". Internetowa encyklopedia PWN (in Polish).
