= Service for Poland's Victory =

First Polish resistance movement in World War II

Service for Poland's Victory (Polish: Służba Zwycięstwu Polski; SZP), also translated as the Polish Victory Service, was the first Polish resistance movement in World War II. It was created by the order of general Juliusz Rómmel on 27 September 1939, when the siege of Warsaw, capital of Poland, where Rómmel commanded Polish defence, was nearing its end (Warsaw would capitulate on 28 September).

The commander of SZP was General Michał Karaszewicz-Tokarzewski. This secret organisation was tasked with the continuing of armed struggle to liberate Poland in the pre-war borders of the Second Polish Republic, recreation and reorganization of the Polish army and establishment of the secret government (Polish Underground State).

In November 1939 SZP was renamed Union of Armed Struggle (ZWZ).

== See also ==
- Związek Walki Zbrojnej
- Home Army
