= Zanarach =

Agrotown in Minsk Region, Belarus

Zanarach Занарач (Belarusian) Занарочь (Russian)
- Agrotown
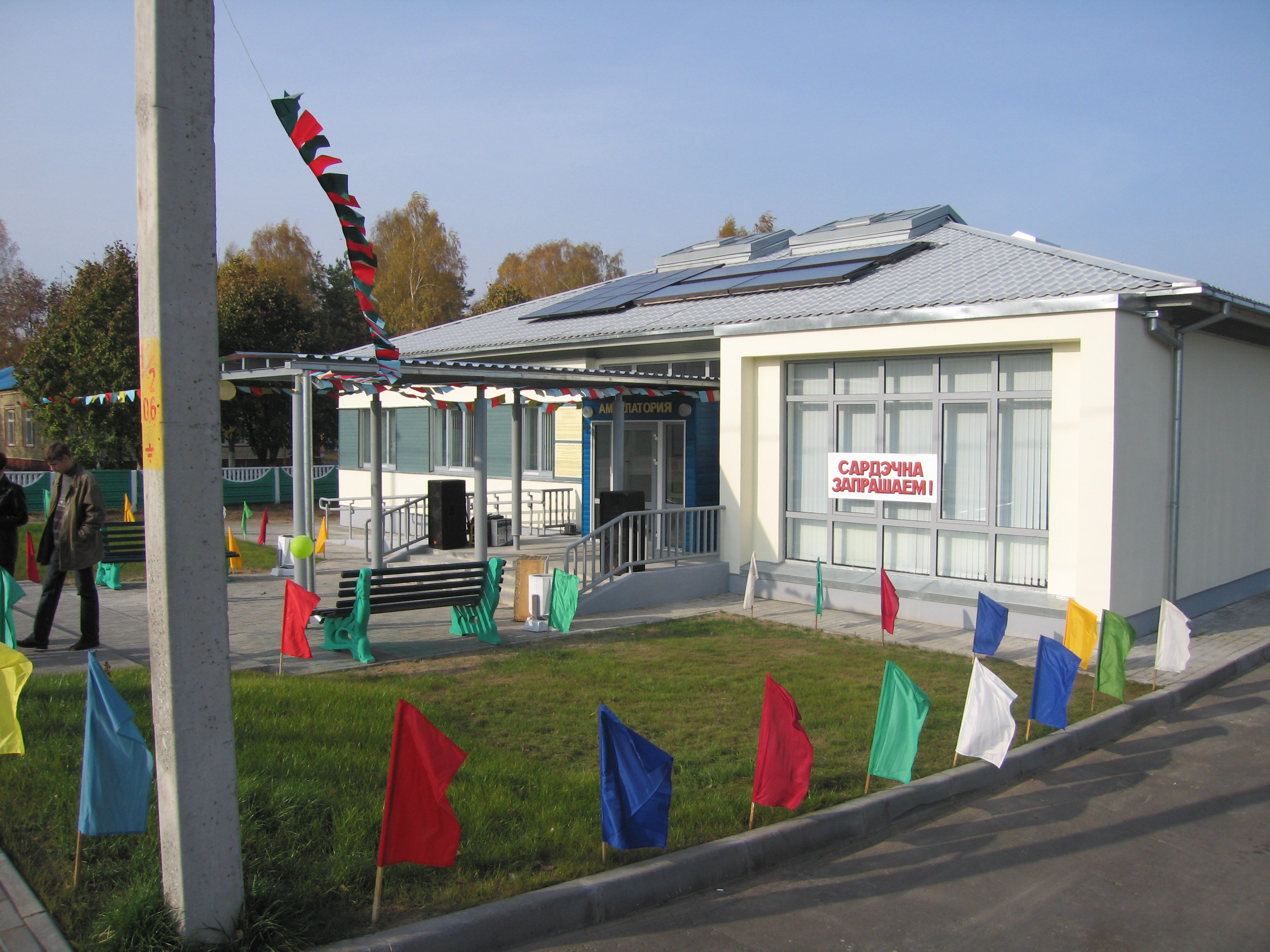
- Outpatient clinic, Zanarach

- Location within Belarus
- Coordinates: 54°48′14″N 26°46′12″E
- Country: Belarus
- Region: Minsk Region
- District: Myadzyel District

Population (2011)
  - Total: 653
- Time zone: UTC+3 (MSK)

Zanarach (Belarusian: За́нарач, romanized: Zanarač; Russian: За́нарочь, romanized: Zanaroch; Polish: Zanarocz) is an agrotown in Myadzyel District, Minsk Region, Belarus. It serves as the administrative center of Zanarach selsoviet. It is located 25 kilometres (16 mi) from Myadzyel, by the southern shore of lake Narach, and its name literally means "place beyond Narach". In 1998, it had a population of 692. In 2011, it had a population of 653.
