= Union of Armed Struggle =

Polish resistance movement during World War II

The Union of Armed Struggle (Polish: Związek Walki Zbrojnej; ZWZ), also translated as the Union for Armed Struggle, Association of Armed Struggle, and Association for Armed Struggle, was a resistance-movement underground army that was formed in Poland following the country's September 1939 invasion by Germany and the Soviet Union that set off World War II. The ZWZ existed from 13 November 1939 until 14 February 1942, when it was renamed the Home Army (Armia Krajowa, or AK).

== History ==
The ZWZ had been created from an earlier organization, Służba Zwycięstwu Polski, or SZP (the Service for Poland's Victory), which had been founded in September 1939 by General Michał Tokarzewski-Karaszewicz.

In January 1940 the ZWZ was split in two:

- the area under German occupation — led by Colonel Stefan Rowecki, headquartered in Warsaw; and
- the area under Soviet occupation — led by General Karaszewicz-Tokarzewski, headquartered in Lwów.

Formally the Union of Armed Struggle was commanded from Paris by General Kazimierz Sosnkowski (nom de guerre Józef Godziemba), who after Poland's defeat had escaped to France via Hungary. Due to practical difficulties, however, Sosnkowski's control of the organization was very limited. Accordingly, in instructions that reached Warsaw on 4 December 1939, he ordered his subordinates to create regional branches of the ZWZ, which was to be a national military organization without regard to political affiliations or social standing. Sosnkowski and his staff also posited that, upon the entry of regular Polish army units, a national uprising would take place.

After the fall of France on 18 June 1940, General Władysław Sikorski appointed Colonel Rowecki his deputy, with the right to take urgent decisions without seeking the consent of the Polish Government-in-Exile. Sikorski urged Rowecki to work closely with the leaders of Poland's political parties within the Political Consultative Committee.

The ZWZ headquarters formally answered to the Polish Government-in-Exile in London, but in reality its military powers were in the hands of officers who remained in occupied Poland and had a good knowledge of the realities there.

After the March 1940 arrest of General Tokarzewski-Karaszewicz by the NKVD on his way from Warsaw to Lwów, the ZWZ in Eastern Poland was left leaderless. Following Germany's Operation Barbarossa invasion of the Soviet Union in June 1941, all of Poland found itself under German occupation.

== See also ==
- Union of Active Struggle (founded in 1908)
