= Home Army 5th Wilno Brigade =

- 5 Wileńska Brygada Armii Krajowej
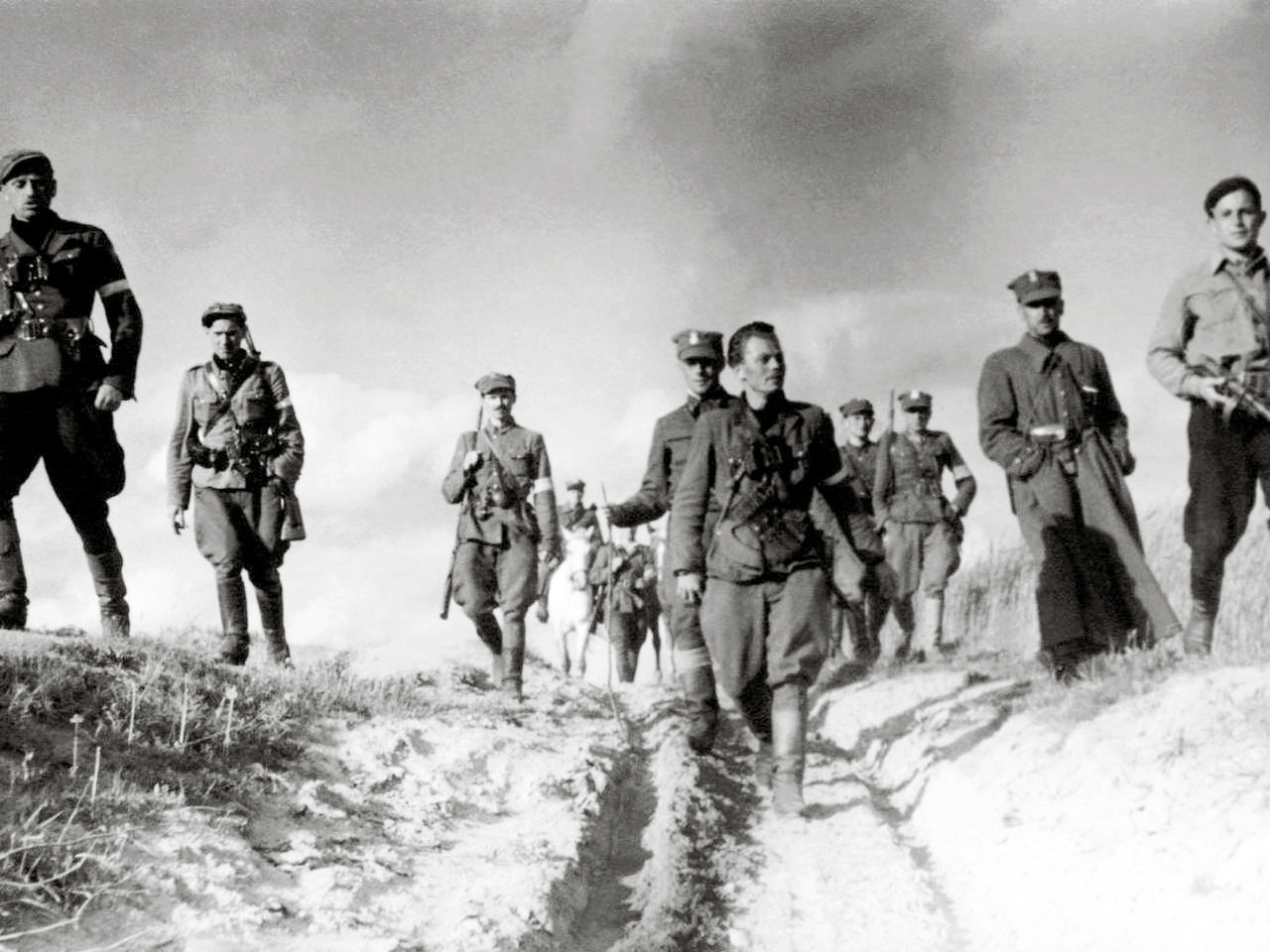
- Home Army 5th Wilno Brigade
- Active: 1944–1949
- Allegiance: Polish Underground State
- Type: guerrilla unit

Commanders
- Commander: Maj. Zygmunt "Łupaszko" Szendzielarz

The Home Army 5th Wilno Brigade (also known as the Brigade of Death) was a unit of the Polish anti-Nazi resistance organization Home Army, active in the Vilnius Region during World War II. The main commander of the brigade was major Zygmunt Szendzielarz, nom de guerre "Łupaszko".

During the German occupation of Poland the brigade found itself in particularly difficult circumstances as it faced off against three different foes; the German Nazis, Lithuanian units, as well as Soviet partisans who generally fought against Home Army units in the region, especially after 1943. In July 1944, the brigade numbered around 500 partisans.
