= List of military units in the Warsaw Uprising =

This is a list of military units taking part in the Warsaw Uprising, a Polish insurrection during the Second World War that began on August 1, 1944.

== Polish units ==
Many of the Home Army units were formed before the beginning of the Uprising; several were organised in the following days as new volunteers joined.

Units were assigned to given areas, namely:

- Area I (Śródmieście, Stare Miasto)
- Area II (Żoliborz, Marymont, Bielany)
- Area III (Wola)
- Area IV (Ochota)
- Area V (Mokotów)
- Area VI (Praga)
- Area VII (Powiat Warszawski)
- Zgrupowanie KeDywu Komendy Głównej

Units were organised into battalions, companies and platoons. Many of those became famous either before the Uprising or during it, including 'Battalion Zośka', 'Czata 49', 'Parasol', and 'Miotła'.

=== Armaments ===
On August 1, the Home Army's arsenal (District of Warsaw, polish: Okręg Warszawa) consisted of:

- 2,629 rifles
- 3,846 pistols
- 657 submachine guns
- 145 light machine guns
- 47 heavy machine guns
- 29 anti-tank rifiles and PIAT anti-tank weapons
- 16 mortars and grenade launchers
- 2 anti-tank guns
- 30 flamethrowers
- 43,971 hand grenades
- 416 anti-tank grenades
- 12,000 Molotov cocktails
- 1,266 explosives

Types of weapons used can be divided into the following categories:

- Polish Army weapons hidden after the invasion of Poland (FB Vis, kb wz. 98a, kbk wz. 29, rkm wz. 28, etc.)
- Homemade weaponry (Błyskawica, K pattern flamethrower, sidolówka, filipinka, Molotov cocktails, etc.)
- Weapons scavenged from the Wehrmacht (Luger pistol, Karabiner 98k, MP 40, etc.)
- Weapons bought directly from the Germans or on the black market
- Weapons from Allied forces, primarily supplied via airdrop (M1911 pistol, Sten, M1 carbine, Bren, PIAT, etc.).

== Complete List of Home Army groups in the Warsaw Uprising ==
The following list does not correspond with the above area list.

Unit group or sector	Unit name	Comp.	Part of	Notes
Group; Śródmieście-Północ (City Center - North)
Sector: North	Dywizjon 'Rum'	3 com.	AK	
Group 'Bartkiewicz'	Szwadron 'Żmudzin'	3 plat. (Each)	AK	After fall of Stare Miasto reinforced with Szwadron 'Gustaw'
Group 'Bartkiewicz'	Szwadron 'Andrzej'	3 plat. (Each)	AK	After fall of Stare Miasto reinforced with Szwadron 'Gustaw'
Group 'Bartkiewicz'	Szwadron 'Lechicz'	3 plat. (Each)	AK	After fall of Stare Miasto reinforced with Szwadron 'Gustaw'
Group 'Bartkiewicz'	Szwadron 'Bohun'	3 plat. (Each)	AK	After fall of Stare Miasto reinforced with Szwadron 'Gustaw'
Group 'Chrobry II'	Dywizjon 'Lech Żelazny'	3 com. (Each)	AK / NSZ	
Group 'Chrobry II'	Dywizjon 'Lech Grzybowski'	3 com. (Each)	AK / NSZ	
Group 'Gurt'	Dywizjon 'Gurt'	3 com. (Each)	AK	
Group 'Gurt'	Battalion WSOP Group IV	3 com. (Each)	AK	
Group 'Hal'	Dywizjon 'im. Sowińskiego'	2 com.	AK	
Group 'Harnasie'	Group 'Harnasie'	2 com.	AK	Companies: 'Genowefa', 'Żyrafa'
Group 'Harnasie'	Company 'Lewera'	2 plat.	AK	
Group 'Kiliński'	Battalion 'im. Kilińskiego'	5 com.	AK	
Group 'Wiktor'	Company 'Wiktor'	4 plat.	AK	
Disposition units	KeDyw Disposition Unit 'A'	2 plat. (Each)	AK	
Disposition units	Company 'Koszta'	2 plat. (Each)	AK	Defensive screen of Warsaw
Disposition units	Company '100' WSOP	3 plat.	AK	District Headquarters
Backup units	Battalion KB	2 com.	KB	Disbanded due to lack of weapons, separate platoons assigned as support for main units.
Group; Śródmieście-Południe (City Center - South)
Sector: North 'Sarna'	Battalion WSOP 'Bełt'	3 comp.	AK	Later named Battalion 'Ostoja'
Sector: North 'Sarna'	Battalion 'Sokół'	1 comp.	KB	
Sector: North 'Sarna'	Battalion 'Chrobry'	2 plat.	PAL	
Sector: South 'Piorun'	Battalion 'Piorun'	3 comp.	AK	Created from Battalion 'Zaremba' and smaller units
Sector: East 'Bogumił'	Battalion 'Kryśka' WSOP	4 comp.	AK	Known as Battalion 'of cpt. Sęp'
Sector: East 'Bogumił'	Battalion 'Miłosz'	3 comp. (Each)	AK	
Sector: East 'Bogumił'	Battalion 'Ruczaj'	3 comp. (Each)	AK	
Sector: East 'Bogumił'	Battalion Siekiera 'Tum'	3 comp. (Each)	AK	Retreated from Stare Miasto
Sector: East 'Bogumił'	Company of AL and PAL	1 plat. (Each)	PAL / AL	
Sector: East 'Bogumił'	Gendarmery PAL Platoon	1 plat. (Each)	PAL	
Sector: West 'Golski'	Battalion 'Golski'	1 com.	AK	Later incorporated Battalion 'Odwet'
Sector: West 'Golski'	Company 'Szafrański'	1 com.	AK	Backup of 'Golski'
Backup units	Battalion 'Iwo'	4 com.	AK	
Backup units	Company from Group 'Ubogi'	2 plat.	AK	Retreated from Ochota
Powiśle
Group 'Krybar'	Battalion 'Konrad'	4 comp. (Each)	AK	
Group 'Krybar'	Battalion 'Ubogi'	4 comp. (Each)	AK	
Group 'Krybar'	Group 'Elektrownia' WSOP	2 comp.	AK	
Group; Warszawa-Północ (Warsaw-North)
Group 'Radosław' and units of 'KeDyw' KG	Battalion 'Czata 49'	several comp.	AK	
Group 'Radosław' and units of 'KeDyw' KG	Battalion 'Miotła'	4 comp.	AK	After Wola fights disbanded due to losses
Group 'Radosław' and units of 'KeDyw' KG	Battalion 'Pięść'	1 comp.	AK	Included 'Agaton' platoon, destroyed in Wola
Group 'Radosław' and units of 'KeDyw' KG	Company 'Leśnik'	3 plat. (Each)	AK	
Group 'Radosław' and units of 'KeDyw' KG	Company 'Waligóra'	3 plat. (Each)	AK	
Group 'Radosław' and units of 'KeDyw' KG	Diversionary Brigade 'Broda 53'	several units	AK	Included Battalion 'Zośka', Unit 'Osjan', 'Dysk', 'Topolnicki" company, motorized unit 'Żuk', intelligence platoon 'Wolski', medical unit 'Rola'.
Group 'Kuba' and 'Sosna'	Battalion 'im. Łukasińskiego'	3 comp. (Each)	AK	
Group 'Kuba' and 'Sosna'	Battalion 'im. Czarnieckiego Gozdawa'	3 comp. (Each)	AK	
Group 'Kuba' and 'Sosna'	Company P20 'Edward'	5 plat.	AK	
Group 'Kuba' and 'Sosna'	Company 'Ryszard' (motorised)	3 plat. (Each)	AK	
Group 'Kuba' and 'Sosna'	Company 'Batory'	3 plat. (Each)	AK	
Group 'Kuba' and 'Sosna'	Platoon 'Roja'	1 plat.	AK	
Group 'Kuba' and 'Sosna'	Company KB 'Nałęcz'	3 plat.	KB	
Group 'Kuba' and 'Sosna'	Platoon NSZ	1 plat. (Each)	NSZ	
Group 'Kuba' and 'Sosna'	Platoon of PPS Militia	1 plat. (Each)	PPS	
Group 'Róg'	Battalion 'Gustaw'	2 com.	AK	Later increased to 3 comp.
Group 'Róg'	Battalion WSOP 'Dzik'	3 comp. (Each)	AK	
Group 'Róg'	Battalion 'Bończa'	3 comp. (Each)	AK	Later increased to 4 comp.
Group 'Róg'	Company 'Orlęta'	4 plat.	AK	After retreat from Stare Miasto, merged with Battalion 'Gustaw'
Group 'Róg'	Company 'Lubiec'	3 plat. (Each)	AK	
Group 'Róg'	Company 'of Syndykalists'	3 plat. (Each)	AK	
Group 'Róg'	Battalion 'Wigry'	2 com. (Each)	AK	
Group 'Róg'	Battalion 'Antoni'	2 com. (Each)	AK	
Group 'Róg'	Battalion 'Czwartacy'	several plat.	AL	
Backup units	Battalion 'Chrobry I'o	3 comp.	AK	
Backup units	Charge Company 'Wyrwy'	2 plat.	AK	
Backup units	Brygada Koło	4 comp.	NSZ	Construction and firefight duties
Żoliborz
Sector: 'Żubr'	Battalion 'Żubr'	1 comp.	AK	
Sector: 'Żmija'	Battalion 'Żmija'	3 plat. (Each)	AK	
Sector: 'Zaglowiec'	Company 'Żaglowiec'	3 plat. (Each)	AK	
Sector: 'Żyrafa'	Company 'Zyrafa'	3 plat. (Each)	AK	
Sector AL	Company AL	2 plat.	AL	
Puszcza; Kampinoska (Kapminos Forest)
Pułk 'Palmiry-Młociny'	III. Dywizjon 78 pp.	3 comp. (Each)	AK	
Pułk 'Palmiry-Młociny'	I. Dywizjon 'Janusz'	3 comp. (Each)	AK	
Pułk 'Palmiry-Młociny'	Dywizjon of 'cpt. Dulka'	3 comp. (Each)	AK	
Pułk 'Palmiry-Młociny'	Dywizjon 27 p. ułańow	4 comp.	AK	
Pułk 'Palmiry-Młociny'	Dywizjon 23 p. ułanów	2 comp.	AK	
Group; Warszaw-Południe (Warsaw-South): Mokotów
Group 'Baszta'	Battalion 'B'	3 comp. (Each)	AK	Mokotów sector
Group 'Baszta'	Battalion 'O'	3 comp. (Each)	AK	
Group 'Baszta'	Battalion 'K'	4 comp.	AK	
Group 'Baszta'	5 group WSOP	2 comp.	AK	
Group 'Góral'	Szwadron 'Szwoleżerów'	3 plat.	AK	
Group 'Olsza'	Company 'Grochów'	3 plat. (Each)	AK	
Group 'Olsza'	Company 'Sadyba'	3 plat. (Each)	AK	
Group 'Olsza'	Szwadron 'Jeżycki'	3 plat. (Each)	AK	
Group 'Ryś'	Company 'Gustaw'	3 plat. (Each)	AK	Czerniaków-Południe sector
Group 'Ryś'	Company 'Krawiec'	3 plat. (Each)	AK	
Group 'Ryś'	Company 'Granat'	3 plat. (Each)	AK	
Group 'Ryś'	Pluton AL	1 plat.	AL	
Forest; Chojnowski and Kabacki
Group 'Gustaw'	Battalion 'Gustaw'	3 comp.	AK	
Group 'Lasy Chojnowskie'	Battalion 'Grzegorz'	3 comp.	AK	
Group 'Lasy Chojnowskie'	Battalion 'Szary'	3 plat.	NSZ	
Group 'Lasy Chojnowskie'	Platoon 'Lanca'	1 plat.	NSZ	

On September 20 this structure was reorganised to fit the structure of Polish forces fighting among the Western Allies. The entire force was renamed to Warsaw Home Army Corps (Warszawski Korpus Armii Krajowej), commanded by general Antoni Chruściel (Monter) and consisted of three infantry divisions:

- 8th Romuald Traugutt Infantry Division (8 Dywizja Piechoty im. Romualda Traugutta) commanded by col. Żywiciel-Niedzielski
- 10th Maciej Rataj Infantry Division (10 Dywizja Piechoty im. Macieja Rataja) commanded by col. Radwan-Pleiffer
- 28th Stefan Okrzeja Infantry Division (28 Dywizja Piechoty im. Stefana Okrzei) commanded by col. Karol-Rokicki

The names of smaller units (battalions, companies and platoons) were left intact (as in the above table).

=== Composition of smaller fighting forces ===
Although the vast majority of the resistance in Warsaw were members of Home Army, there was a small number of fighters who weren't members of that organisation. In the course of the Uprising some 1,700 members of other resistance organisations joined the Uprising. Those included the Armia Ludowa, Gwardia Ludowa and Narodowe Siły Zbrojne.

Along with the Polish soldiers who took part in the Uprising, there were also members of other nationalities. Among them was a number of Hungarian deserters and Italian escapees from POW camps in Poland. Another ex-POW soldier was RAF Sgt. John Ward, whose numerous coded radio dispatches gave an eyewitness account of the fighting to the British government and Polish government-in-exile, as well as the London press. There was also the Slovak 535th platoon under Lt. Stanko. It was composed mostly of Slovaks, Georgians, Armenians and Azeri, and suffered heavy casualties in the course of the uprising (up to 70%).

It is believed that some 25,000 Jews were hiding in Warsaw before the Uprising. The vast majority of them died together with other Polish civilians. However, many Jews (possibly as many as 1,000), including those released by Home Army from the Warsaw concentration camp (Gęsiówka), joined the Home Army. During the final stage of the battle a number of Soviet soldiers (possibly as many as 3,000, most of them members of Polish units in Soviet army) also crossed the river and fought the Germans in Powiśle area. Airdrops were carried out by allied airmen from Italy, mostly by Poles, Canadians and the British.

== German units ==
As of 23 August 1944 the German units directly involved with fights in Warsaw were divided into:

- Kampfgruppe Rohr (commanded by Generalmajor Gunther Rohr)
  - Waffen-Sturmbrigade RONA (commanded by Waffen-Brigadeführer Bronislav Kaminski)
- Kampfgruppe Reinefarth (commanded by SS-Gruppenführer Heinz Reinefarth)
  - Kampfgruppe Dirlewanger (commanded by SS-Oberführer der Reserve Oskar Dirlewanger)
  - Kampfgruppe Reck (commanded by Major Reck)
  - Kampfgruppe Schmidt (commanded by Colonel Schmidt)
  - various support and backup units
- Warsaw Garrison (Group of Warsaw Commandant) commanded by Lieutenant General Stahel

A large section of the forces on the German side were, according to Norman Davies, drawn from "collaborationist forces" including Russians who had left in the Tzar's era and Azeris.
