= Kubuś =

Polish World War II improvised armoured car

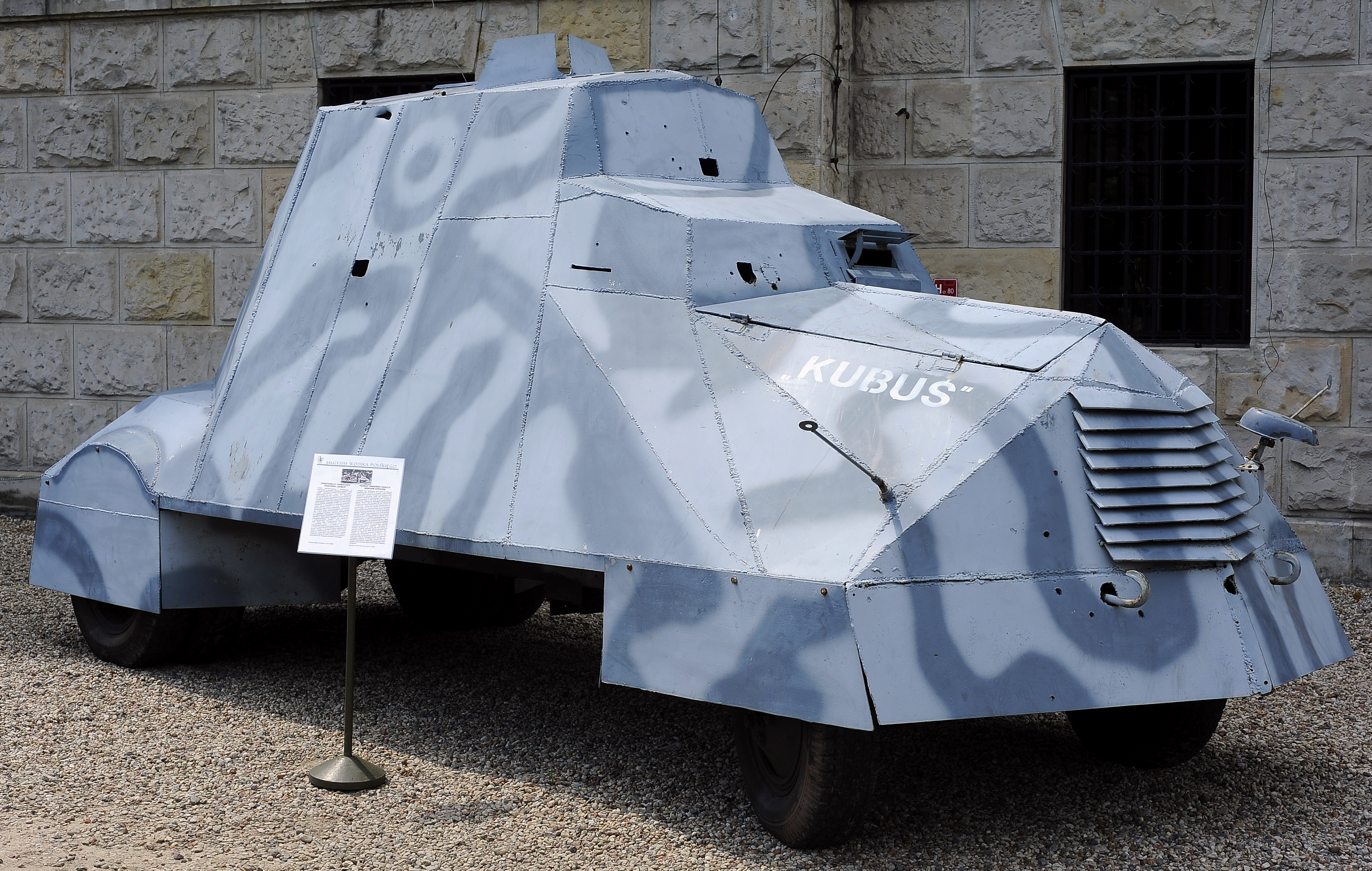
- The original Kubuś car at the Polish Army Museum
- Type: Improvised armored car/personnel carrier
- Place of origin: Poland

Service history
- In service: August 22, 1944 – September 6, 1944
- Used by: Home Army
- Wars: Warsaw Uprising

Production history
- Designer: Main engineer: Walerian Bielecki (nom-de-guerre Jan)
- Designed: August 8, 1944 – August 22, 1944
- Manufacturer: A car repair shop belonging to Stanisław Kwiatkowski in Warsaw's borough of Powiśle, at the corner of Tamka Street and Topiel Street.
- Developed from: Chevrolet 157 truck
- Produced: August 8, 1944 – August 22, 1944
- No. built: 1

Specifications
- Mass: 4.5 t (4.4 long tons; 5.0 short tons)
- Length: 6.09 m (20 ft)
- Width: Front: 2.24 m (7 ft 4 in); Rear: 2.28 m (7 ft 6 in)
- Height: 2.59 m (8 ft 6 in)
- Crew: 2–3
- Passengers: 8–10 Partisans
- Armor: 5–6 mm (0.20–0.24 in) sloped armour
- Main armament: PIAT Mk I; DP-27 machine gun; K pattern flamethrower
- Secondary armament: Hand grenades (Sidolówka, Filipinka)
- Engine: Chevrolet 6-cylinder 3548 cc engine 78 hp (58 kW) @ 3200 rpm
- Drive: 4×2
- Transmission: 4 forward / 1 reverse
- Fuel capacity: 50 L (11 imp gal; 13 US gal)
- Maximum speed: 50 km/h (31 mph)

Kubuś (Polish equivalent of the diminutive "Jakey") is a Polish improvised fighting vehicle used by the Home Army in the Warsaw Uprising during World War II. The single vehicle was built in secret to function as an armoured car and armoured personnel carrier for assaults by the Home Army, where it suffered damage and was abandoned after two weeks of service. The original Kubuś vehicle survived the war and is on display in the Polish Army Museum, while a full-scale replica was built for the Warsaw Uprising Museum and frequently takes part in various open-air festivals and reenactment shows.

== History ==
=== Design ===
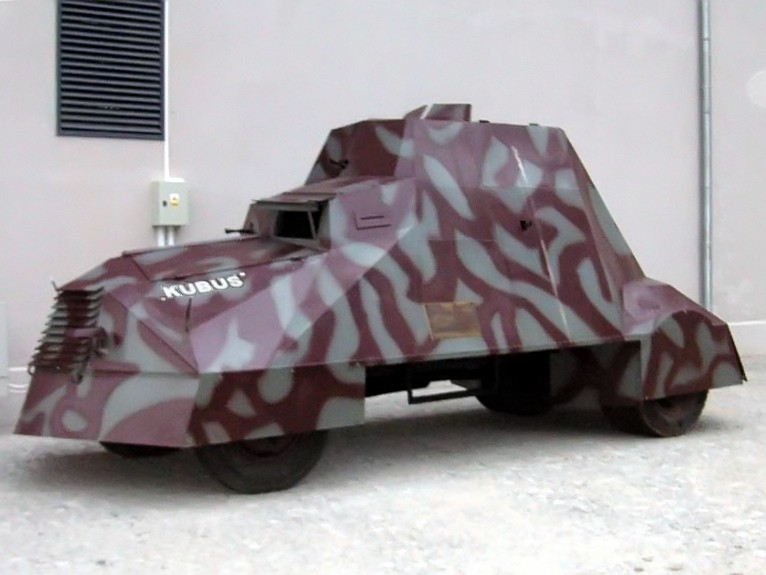
Modern replica at the Warsaw Uprising Museum

The Kubuś was based on the chassis of a civilian Chevrolet 157 truck which had been license-built in pre-war Poland by the Lilpop, Rau i Loewenstein company. The chassis was fitted with steel plates for protection of the crew, which were bolted to a steel frame and then welded together. The armoured car had a crew of two, could carry between eight and ten soldiers, and was armed with an air-dropped PIAT Mk I (supplied by the Allies), a Soviet-built DP-27 machine gun, underground-built K pattern flamethrower and hand grenades (most likely Polish-built Sidolówka and Filipinka grenades), in addition to personal armament of the soldiers. The name Kubuś was taken in honour of the wife of one of the constructors known as Globus, as she was killed in early August and had used the pseudonym Kubuś, Polish for "Little Jacob", but also the Polish name for Winnie the Pooh.

=== Construction and Service ===
The construction of Kubuś started on August 8, 1944, one week after the beginning of the Warsaw Uprising, in a car repair shop belonging to Stanisław Kwiatkowski in Warsaw's borough of Powiśle, at the corner of Tamka Street and Topiel Street. The main engineer of the vehicle was Walerian Bielecki (nom-de-guerre Jan), and with no design prepared on paper, all construction was improvised in situ. The construction of Kubuś was completed on August 22, taking only 13 days from the decision to build to the handing over of the vehicle to Home Army fighting units. The vehicle entered service immediately upon completion, and was attached to the "Wydra" motorised unit. The following day, together with a captured Sd.Kfz.251/3 Ausf.D named "Gray Wolf", it took part in a failed assault at the main campus of the University of Warsaw, which had been turned into a military garrison by the Wehrmacht. The same assault was repeated two weeks later on September 2. During the second assault, Kubuś received minor damage and was successfully withdrawn from combat to Polish-held areas, but it was not repaired, and on September 6 it was abandoned at Okólnik Street.

=== After the Uprising ===
The original Kubuś survived the war, and in 1945 was towed to the Polish Army Museum as one of the first exhibits after the museum had been looted by the Germans, where it was restored and exhibited; it remains there to this day. A full-scale operational replica was created in 2004 by Juliusz Siudziński and is, as of 2009, on exhibition at the Warsaw Uprising Museum. One of the crewmembers of Kubuś during the uprising was Krzysztof Boruń, who would later become a prominent journalist and science fiction writer.
