= Stanisław Bóbr-Tylingo =

Polish historian (1919–2001)

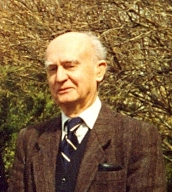
Stanisław Bóbr-Tylingo

Stanisław Bóbr-Tylingo (1919–2001) was a Polish-born historian who specialized in 19th-century Polish history, a Polish resistance fighter who after 1945 had to live his life in exile in Britain and Canada, and a decorated veteran of the Polish Warsaw Uprising in August–September 1944. For most of his adult life, he was a professor of history at Saint Mary's University in Halifax, Nova Scotia, Canada.

== Biography ==
Stanisław Tylingo was born in Warsaw on 30 March 1919. His family were formerly owners of the estate Suderwa near Wilno (Vilnius), but because of participation in the Revolution of 1905 had lost that property to Tsarist confiscation, and consequently had moved to Warsaw. There he attended the Gymnasium Tadeusz Czacki and the Lyceum Adam Mickiewicz where he passed his matriculation exams in the last days before the outbreak of World War II. Consequently, he had to pursue his university studies during the German occupation in the (tajne komplety) underground University of Warsaw.

The German and Soviet invasions of Poland in September 1939 caught him in a training camp in eastern Poland near the city of Grodno. Already while in secondary school (probably in 1937–38) he was initiated into the National Radical Camp (Obóz Narodowo Radykalny or ONR), a nationalist conspiracy organization opposed to the then government of the "Colonels", and when Poland was attacked, he joined the ONR's military force, the Związek Jaszczurczy (ZJ or Salamander Association), which later in 1942 became the National Armed Forces (Narodowe Siły Zbrojne or NSZ; not to be confused with the Polish Government-in-Exile's Armia Krajowa or Home Army).

When the Soviets invaded from the east (17 September 1939), Stanisław joined up with the defenders of Grodno and fought a three-day battle with the Red Army in which the Soviets lost 800 men, 19 tanks, and four armored cars. The Poles nevertheless were overpowered by their two neighbors, so Stanisław destroyed his weapons and made his way back to Warsaw, where he continued to participate in underground activity against the German and Soviet occupation. He was involved in actions in both Warsaw and Kraków, and for a short time in Rzeszow and Radom. He became an instructor in the underground Infantry Military College of the NSZ, and was given the pseudonym Bóbr (Beaver), which, like many of his fellow soldiers, he retained for the rest of his life.

It was also during the time of the occupation that he began his historical studies at the underground University of Warsaw under the direction of Prof. Maria Ossowska in Philosophy, Prof. Tadeusz Manteuffel in Medieval History, Prof. Janusz Woliński in Modern Polish History, and Prof. Władysław Tomkiewicz in Modern European History.

The Warsaw Uprising of the Home Army on 1 August 1944 caught him in Warsaw. He belonged to that part of the NSZ that had subordinated itself in March 1944 to the command of the Home Army, and so he fought in the Uprising in the NSZ unit "Koło"; with his fellow students he formed the Academic Legion. He fought in the Old Town district on the Redoubt of Senatorska – Miodowa Street where he became commander of a barricade from 7 to 14 August (and where his brother Marian was killed by a tank missile). He was one of five soldiers that obtained the capture of a German antitank cannon in Foch Street. Then to the end of August he was deputy commander of the squad that captured and then defended the left flank at the Polish Bank. Here he received a severe wound in his right leg, but it did not make him withdraw from the fighting.

His unit was one of the last to abandon the Old Town through the sewer system on the morning of 2 September 1944 at about 10:00 am. A few minutes later the Germans took Krasiński Square, where was located the last free opening to the sewers in Old Town, It took about six hours for him to pass through the sewers to the city center (Śródmieście) during which time his injured leg was in constant contact with the putrefying matter in the sewer: but contrary to what one would expect his injury began to heal very quickly.

In the city center he held command of a position on Jerozolimski Avenue in the Battalion of Captain "Barski" in the "Koło" unit, and on Chmielna Street where he lost his last friends in the ONR from before the war. A hand grenade explosion drove binoculars into his eyes, but fortunately he got back his eyesight. For his service in the Old Town he was awarded the Cross of Merit, and then as one of only four NSZ soldiers, he was decorated with the Virtuti Militari Class V in Bracki Street directly from the hands of General Bór-Komorowski, the overall commander of the Uprising. At the beginning of the Uprising he had been a corporal officer cadet; he left Warsaw as a second lieutenant, having received the highest possible Polish military decoration.

Upon surrender of the Home Army on 3 October 1944 along with the rest of the AK he became a German POW interned first in Oflag Lamsdorf, Silesia, and then Murnau, Bavaria. Upon liberation in 1945 he was assigned to the Holy Cross Brigade (Brygada Świętokrzyska, from the region of the Holy Cross Mountains in southern Poland) where he was given command of a platoon in the guard companies. It was there that he met his future wife, Captain Halina Reszke, Chief of the Auxiliary Women's Service on the staff of the NSZ.

Before the outbreak of World War II, he had had military training as a parachutist, and so after the end of the war he made a jump back into Poland in order to create a communication link and an evacuation route to countries in the West from out of the now Soviet occupied Poland. In January 1946 he received leave without limit from the NSZ to pursue historical studies in Paris, which he completed with a doctorate under Prof. Pierre Renouvin in 1955. His thesis was on the diplomacy of the Polish Question in the time of Napoleon III. Halina Jadwiga Reszke, now his wife, also pursued her studies in Biology in Paris.

His first academic position was as worden of the Polish students at the Cork Campus of the National University of Ireland. Then in 1958 he secured a position as History and French language teacher at the Lingfield School in Surrey in England. It was at this time that he began to publish articles on his specialty in the 'free' historical journals in Paris (Revue Internationale d’Histoire Politique et Constitutionnelle, and its successor Politique …), London (Bellona and Teki Historyczne), and Rome (Antemurale). Also at this time he won acceptance as a corresponding member of the Polish Scientific Society in Exile (Polskie Towarzystwo Naukowo na Obczyżne or PTNO). He obtained his Habilitation in the Polish University in Exile in 1964 under Professor General Marian Kukiel, who wrote of him that "he is at this moment one of the best historical experts on diplomacy in the time of the [French] Second Empire."

Likewise from 1958 he was a member of the Polish Historical Society in Great Britain (Polskie Towarzystwo Historyczne w Wielkiej Britanii) which society published Teki Historyczne - Cahiers d’Historie - Historical papers, where he published 18 articles from volume 5 (1951–52) to volume 22 (2000–01), mainly on the diplomatic relations of the European powers re Poland in the period of the Crimean War 1854-56 and the January Uprising 1863; in volume 19 he published two articles on the topic of German diplomacy towards the newly restored Poland in the years 1918–1919. He was a long-standing member of the editorial committee of the Teki Historyczne and chairman of that committee for the decade 1981-1991 – and again up to his death in 2001 a member of the committee. He published 44 book reviews in Teki Historyczne, the last of which were sent in just two months before his death.

From 1959 onward he began publishing his research in North America: in the Etudes Slaves (Montreal) and the Polish Review (New York). Then in 1963 he obtained an appointment as assistant professor in the History Department of Saint Mary's University in Halifax, Nova Scotia. He (together with his wife teaching in the Biology Department) remained at SMU for the rest of his life. He was promoted to associate professor in 1963, granted tenure in 1965, promoted to full professor in 1971, retired in 1984, taught part-time to 1986, and then made professor emeritus in 1988. During his retirement he wrote a history of the restored Polish Republic, 1919–1947 (337 pages in typescript).

Typically his publications were based on primary research in historical archives: in France, Britain, Germany, Belgium, Denmark, USA, and Istanbul. He never finished his last work, a history of Poland from origins to the mid 17th century on which he spent the last five years of his life (970 pages in typescript). The work was cut short at 1650 by his sudden death, and he had intended to write a history of the Crimean War. He died rather unexpectedly by a stroke on 18 December 2001 and is buried with his wife (died 17 April 2010) in the Oakridge Memory Gardens, Sackville, Nova Scotia.

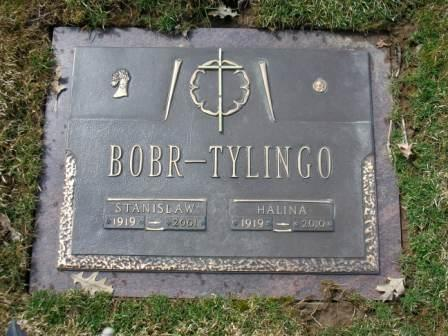
Grave of Bóbr-Tylingo

Both Stanisław and his wife Halina remained Polish patriots throughout their lives. They entertained at their home many Polish friends, among them Prof. Stanisław Swianiewicz and Prof. Lillian Falk (both also faculty members at SMU), General Stanisław Kopański, Professor General Marian Kukiel, and many other accomplished people of Polish origin. The Bóbr-Tylingos were responsible for the creation of the Polish Association of Halifax-Dartmouth (1982), a Polish Apostolate with a Polish priest, a Polish School, Polish scouts, a Polish publishing house, and a Polish library. They both deserve well of Poles and Poland.
