= Cheddite =

Class of explosive materials

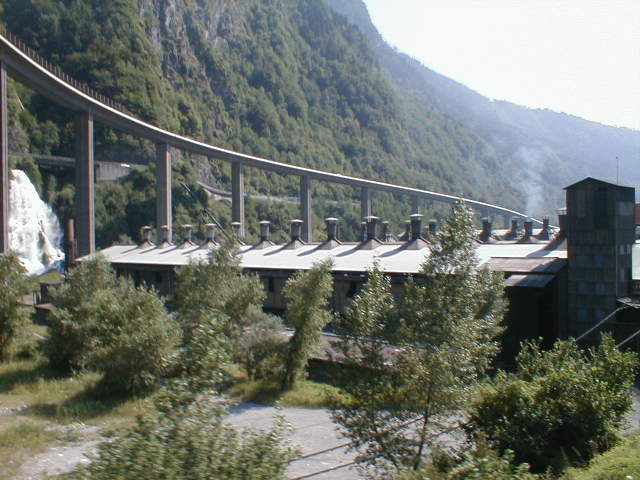
A factory in Chedde, Haute-Savoie, France, where Cheddite was first produced.

Cheddite is a class of explosive materials invented in France in 1897 by E. A. G. Street, who patented several varieties of the original composition. At about the same time the Chemische Fabrik Griesheim in Germany patented a similar type explosive. The manufacture of these explosives under the name of "Explosifs Street" began in 1898 by the Société Bergès, Corbin et Cie at Chedde, Haute-Savoie, France. Certain varieties of these explosives were admitted to Belgium. They were also exported to England where they have been produced since 1900 under the name of "Cheddites", so called because they were manufactured at Chedde.

Closely related to Sprengel explosives, Cheddites consist of a high proportion of inorganic chlorates or perchlorates, mixed with other substances that aid the explosive reaction (e.g. nitroaromatics such as dinitrobenzene or dinitrotoluene) and that moderate the chlorates/perchlorates (e.g. paraffin or castor oil).

Several different Cheddites or Cheddite-type explosives were made, in gelatinous or non-gelatinous form. Gelatin-type Cheddites are plastic explosives which do not harden in storage; they were developed in 1911 by C. Rubins and manufactured by the Cheddit & Dynamit AG, Liestal, Switzerland, and then in other countries; these explosives have a higher brisance than ammonium nitrate explosives.

In regard to the manufacturing process of explosives containing chlorates – such as Cheddites – a very important thing to remember is this: chlorates should never be mixed with ammonium salts, as this would form ammonium chlorate which could explode spontaneously.

Cheddites were originally developed for use as industrial blasting and demolition explosives. Gelatin-type Cheddites are very effective for work in galleries, especially with humid rocks that are not too hard. Some Cheddites were used during World War I for military purposes such as in demolition work and as a bursting charge in bombs, grenades, mortars shells and mines. Cheddites were also used during World War II for some military purposes.

Cheddite was a favourite explosive compound manufactured by the Polish Home Army (Polish: Armia Krajowa, abbreviated AK) in occupied Poland during World War II; for example, it was used as a filler for the R wz. 42 "Sidolówka" improvised hand grenade.

"Cheddite" is also the trade name of an Italian company established in 1901 in Salviano, near Livorno, as a subsidiary of the French firm, that produces ammunitions and explosives.

== Compositions ==
The compositions of the first Cheddites or Street Explosives studied and approved for manufacturing at the Poudrerie de Vonges by the French Commission des Substances Explosives, beginning 1897, are presented in the following table:

Table I
Composition	I	II	III
Potassium chlorate	75.0	74.6	80
Picronitronaphthalene	20	–	–
Nitronaphthalene	–	5.5	12.0
Starch	–	14.9	–
Castor oil	5.0	5.0	8.0

The compositions of a few more notable Cheddites are presented in the following table:

Table II
Composition	French O n° 1 60bis	French Sevranites n° 1	Italian OS Extra	Italian Plastigel II	British Blastine	German Military	Belgian Yonckite
Potassium chlorate	80	–	–	–	–	–	–
Potassium perchlorate	–	–	–	–	–	56	–
Sodium chlorate	–	–	90	72.0	–	–	–
Sodium nitrate	–	–	–	–	22	–	32
Ammonium perchlorate	–	31	–	–	60	–	43
Mononitronaphthalene (MNN)	13	–	–	–	–	12	–
Dinitrotoluene (DNT)	2	–	–	19.7	–	–	–
Trinitrotoluene (TNT)	–	–	–	–	11	–	15
Dinitrobenzene (DNB)	–	–	–	–	–	32	–
Pentaerythritol tetranitrate (PETN)	–	48	–	6.5	–	–	–
Castor oil	5	–	–	–	–	–	–
Collodion cotton	–	–	–	1.8	–	–	–
Paraffin	–	–	7	–	7	–	–
Vaselin	–	–	3	–	–	–	–
Plasticizer	–	18	–	–	–	–	–
Aluminum powder	–	3	–	–	–	–	10

== See also ==
- Sprengel explosive
- Boxer Primer
