= Filipinka =

ET wz. 40
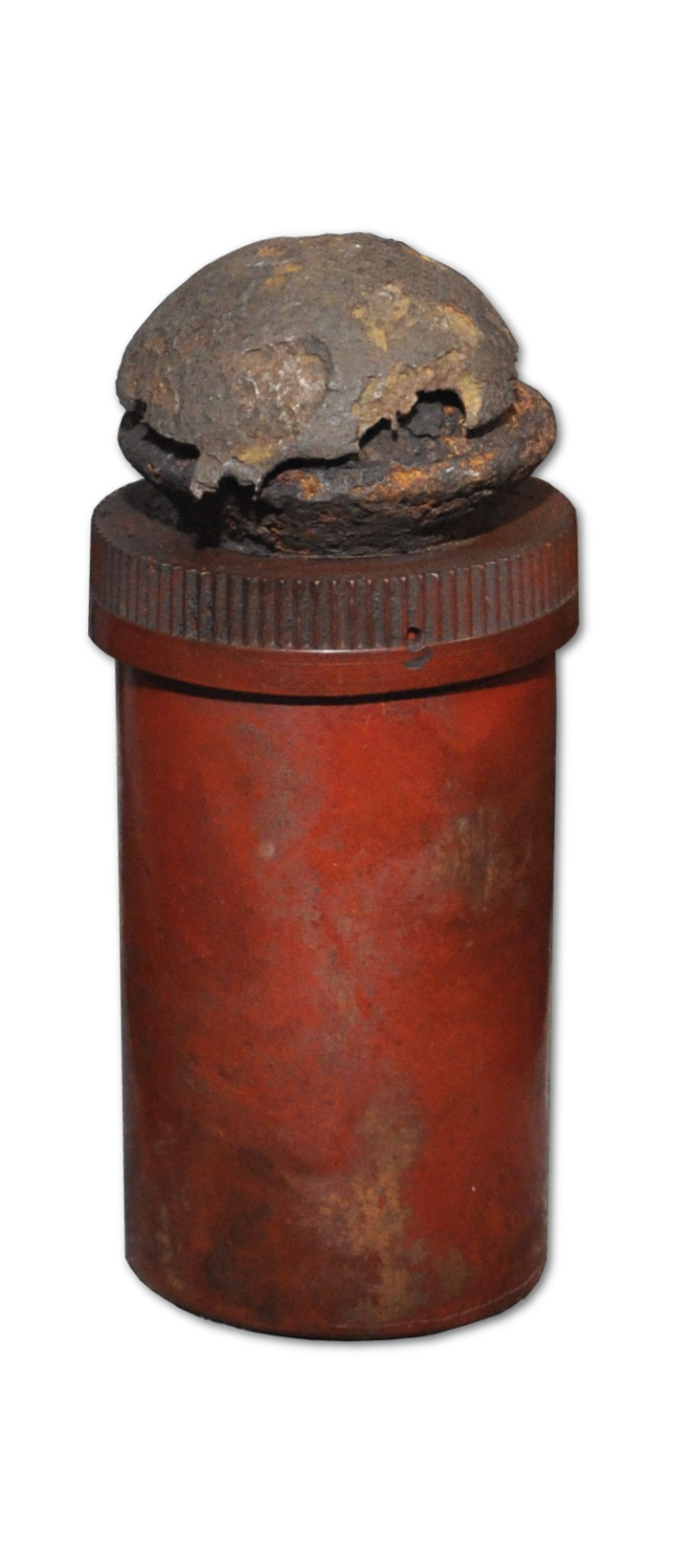
- Filipinka in the Museum of the Warsaw Rising
- Type: Offensive fragmentation hand grenade
- Place of origin: Poland

Service history
- In service: 1942–1947

Production history
- Designed: 1942
- No. built: 240,000
- Variants: various shell types

Specifications
- Length: 95 mm (3.7 in)
- Diameter: 53 mm (2.1 in)
- Filling: cheddite or ammonal
- Filling weight: ~250 g (8.8 oz)
- Detonation mechanism: Contact fuze

Filipinka (also Wańka, Perełka) was a commonly used unofficial name for the ET wz. 40 homemade hand grenade produced for the Armia Krajowa during World War II in occupied Poland.

It was designed by a former worker of the Rembertów Polish Army munition works, Edward Tymoszak (hence the ET abbreviation). It was partially based on his pre-war design of an ET wz. 38 anti-tank grenade.

The Filipinka was an offensive impact grenade, cylindrical in shape. A screw for the fuse was located in the upper part of the shell. Coating of the first series (roughly 4,000 produced) was made of Bakelite, which shattered without producing fragments like a metal-bodied grenade. Later the shell was replaced with a metal impress. The filling was composed mostly of home-made explosives, either cheddite or ammonal. At times explosives from German air bombs and artillery shells, as well as British plastic explosive delivered through air bridges was used. The grenade was equipped with a contact fuze which functioned on impact with the target.

The coating was painted with various colours to allow for easier usage in resistance service and easier hiding. After 1941 all grenades were marked with an inscription in Russian (Desantnaya Udarnaya Granata 41 - Assault Impact Grenade Mark 41) in order to conceal the real origin of the weapon and ensure the safety of the production facilities. Throughout the war approximately 240,000 grenades of this type were produced. Many of them were used in various battles of the Operation Tempest, including the Warsaw Uprising.

== See also ==
- Sidolówka
