= K pattern flamethrower =

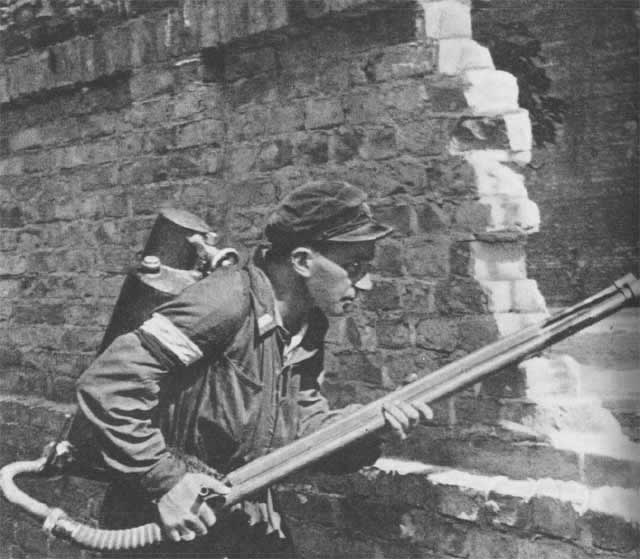
- An insurgent during the Warsaw Uprising with a K pattern flamethrower
- Type: Flamethrower
- Place of origin: Poland

Service history
- In service: 1944
- Used by: Home Army
- Wars: World War II, Warsaw Uprising

Production history
- Produced: 1942-1944
- No. built: several hundreds

Specifications
- Mass: 25.6 kg (56 1/2 lb) filled
- Crew: 4
- Maximum firing range: If propellant was compressed air, range was 30–40 m; if oxygen, up to 60 m
- Feed system: 2 fuel tanks (16 L total)
- Sights: None

The K pattern flamethrower (Polish: miotacz ognia wzór K) was a man-portable backpack flamethrower, produced in occupied Poland during World War II for the underground Home Army. These flamethrowers were used in the Warsaw Uprising in 1944.

== Construction ==
Design work upon a simple flamethrower for the Polish underground, suitable for clandestine production in ordinary workshops, of readily available materials, started in 1942 on request of the Home Army main headquarters. Its main purpose was to be used against armoured vehicles. There were several designs produced, of which the most popular was the K pattern, becoming a sort of standard weapon of the Polish underground. The exact number produced is difficult to estimate, but it was several hundreds (in one workshop of Antoni Więckowski in Warsaw alone, there were about 400 produced). Its production was concentrated in Warsaw. Due to production conditions, many flamethrowers differed in details.

The main parts of the flamethrower were two interconnected cylindrical steel fuel tanks (16 L capacity total, height 45 cm, diameter 16 cm), and a compressed air bottle (6 L, height 60 cm, diameter 12 cm). This tank assembly was fitted with straps to permit it to be carried on the operator's back. Fuel was a mixture of diesel fuel (75%) and gasoline (25%). There was a valve between the fuel and air tanks. A rubber fuel hose connected the assembly with a fuel gun, which was a pipe 114 cm long, fitted with a valve at the muzzle, operated with a handle.

After opening a fuel gun valve, the fuel was propelled with compressed air and ignited by a simple mesh basket wrapped with a flaming rope, at the muzzle of the fuel gun (the rope had to be ignited before the weapon could be used). Normal way of operation were short 1-second bursts – about 30 could be fired. The mesh basket with the rope was extinguished, putting a tin can on it.

The K-pattern flamethrower appeared a successful weapon, considering its primitive design and conditions of manufacturing. Its main flaw was that the air pressure decreased during operation, and so successive bursts had a progressively shorter range. The weapon could be refueled by fuel carriers and the compressed air bottle replaced with a new one, in a procedure that took about four minutes.

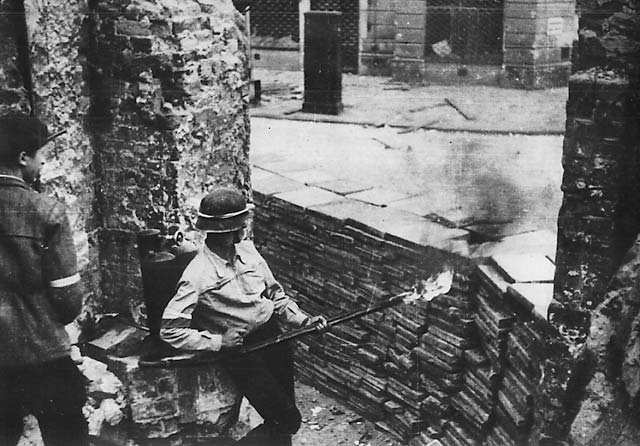
A flamethrower in action

== Combat usage ==
A flamethrower section consisted of four soldiers: a commander, a gunner carrying the flamethrower and two carriers of fuel cans and spare air bottles.

At the outbreak of the Warsaw Uprising the Polish forces had only 30 flamethrowers – many had been lost in secret stores discovered by the Germans, and a number remained in stores that were not available for insurgents. Nonetheless, they were actively used in the sectors of the fiercest street fighting during the uprising. A number of flamethrowers were also produced during the uprising. Most sections acted alone, but there was also one flamethrower company formed.

== Sources ==
- Michał Pacut, date unknown, “A flame thrower from the workshop of Antoni Więckowski”, Article by Muzeum Wojska Polskiego
- Skotnicki, Mariusz (in Polish): Miotacz ognia wzór "K", in: Nowa Technika Wojskowa 7/1998, p. 59. ISSN 1230-1655

== See also ==
- List of flamethrowers
