= Sidolówka =

R wz. 42
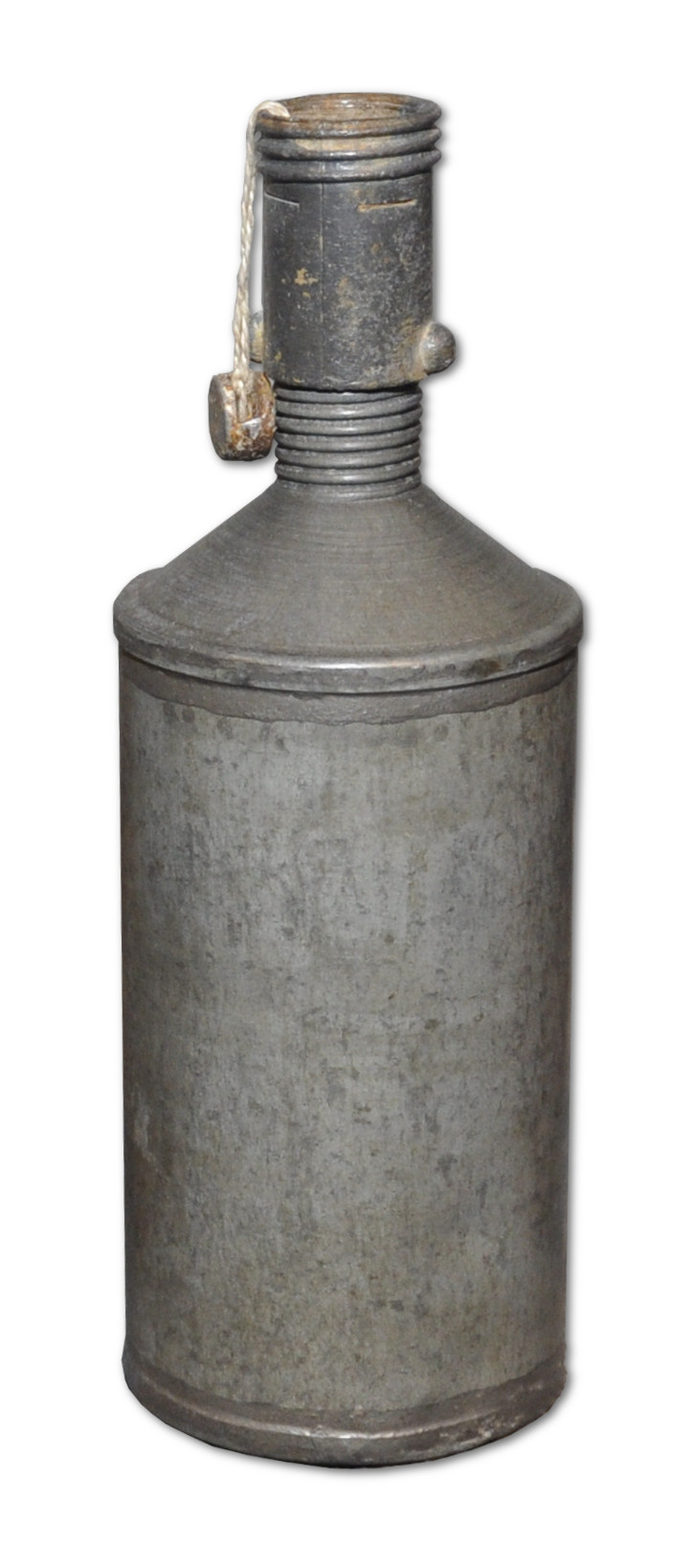
- Sidolówka on exhibition in the Museum of the Warsaw Uprising
- Type: Offensive fragmentation
- Place of origin: Poland

Service history
- In service: 1942–1947

Production history
- Designed: 1942
- No. built: 350,000
- Variants: various shell types

Specifications
- Length: 122 mm (4.8 in)
- Diameter: 55 mm (2.2 in)
- Filling: cheddite or amonite
- Filling weight: 250 g (8.8 oz)
- Detonation mechanism: Timed friction fuse

The Sidolówka was an unofficial, yet common, name of the R wz. 42 hand grenade, produced by the Polish resistance organization Armia Krajowa in occupied Poland during World War II.

The name of the grenade came from Sidol, a metal-cleaning agent from Henkel sold in Poland at the time. The first grenades used the Sidol bottles as the casing. Later on the casing was purposely modelled after the bottle in order to allow for easier hiding of the weapon.

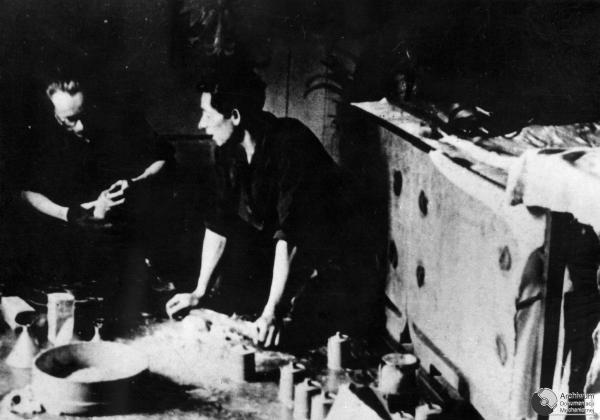
Production in an underground facility in Lwów

Sidolówka was first produced in Warsaw in 1942, by the professors of the Warsaw University of Technology under the leadership of Jan Czochralski. It was partially based on an earlier design of the Filipinka grenade, also of underground construction, which in turn was based on a pre-war Polish ET-38 anti-tank grenade. The primer and the detonator were designed by two engineers of the pre-war Polish munition works in Warsaw, pyrotechnician Władysław Pankowski and engineer Józef Michałowski.

It was a fragmentation grenade with a P-42 friction primer and a 4.5 second delay time. Until the end of World War II, an estimate of 350,000 R-42 were produced in Polish underground factories. A large number of such grenades were used in the Warsaw Uprising and other battles of the Operation Tempest.

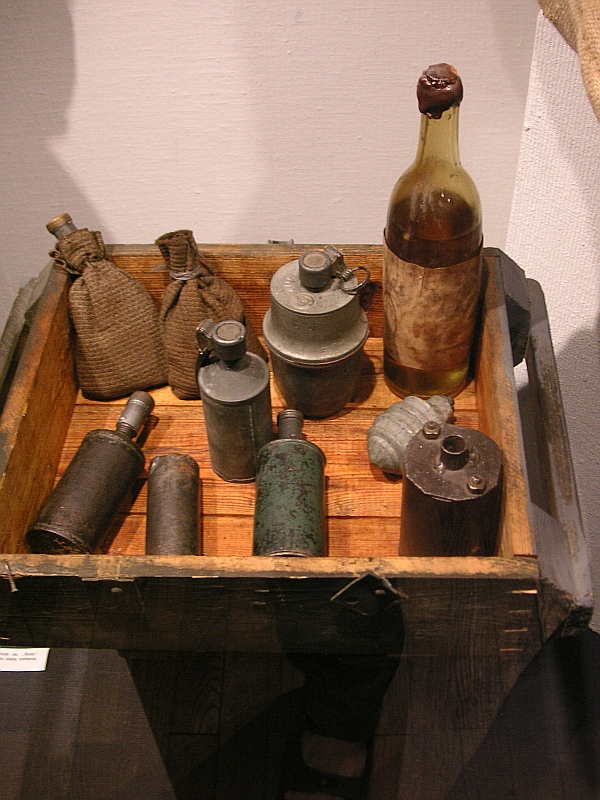
Various types of Sidolówka coatings along with two satchel charges and a single anti-tank bottle

== External sources ==
- Armed Forces Museum's Movie about Polish hand grenades between 1930 and 1945
