= July 1944 =

Month of 1944

<<	July 1944					>>
Su	Mo	Tu	We	Th	Fr	Sa
						1
2	3	4	5	6	7	8
9	10	11	12	13	14	15
16	17	18	19	20	21	22
23	24	25	26	27	28	29
30	31

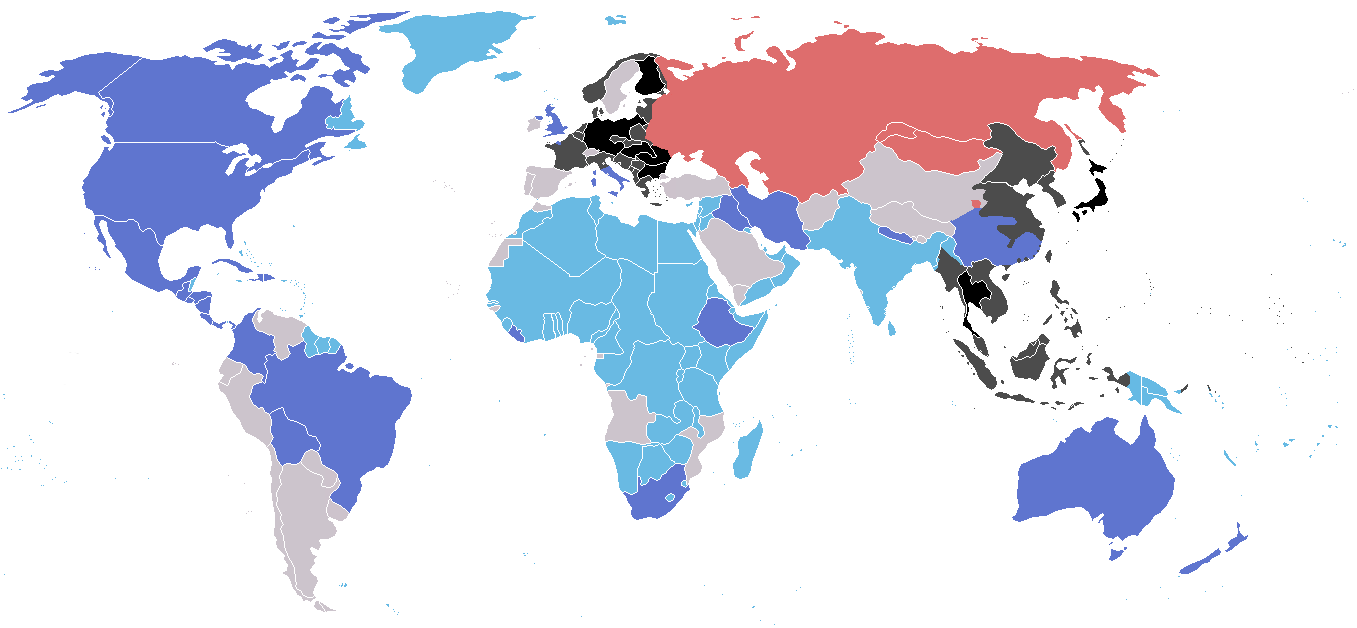
World War II 1944

The following events occurred in July 1944:

== July 1, 1944 (Saturday) ==
- A counterattack by the German II SS Panzer Corps failed to dislodge the British Second Army around Caen. When Gerd von Rundstedt phoned Berlin to report the failure, Chief of Staff Wilhelm Keitel purportedly asked, "What shall we do?", to which Rundstedt replied, "Make peace, you fools! What else can you do?"
- The U.S. 133rd Infantry Regiment in Italy captured Cecina.
- The United Nations Monetary and Financial Conference began in Bretton Woods, New Hampshire to regulate the international monetary systems of the post-war world.
- U.S. President Franklin D. Roosevelt signed the Public Health Service Act and the Renunciation Act of 1944 into law.
- "I'll Be Seeing You" by Bing Crosby topped the Billboard singles charts.
- Died: Carl Mayer, 49, Austrian screenwriter (cancer)

== July 2, 1944 (Sunday) ==
- The Battle of Noemfoor began between Allied and Japanese forces in Netherlands New Guinea.
- The day after his telephone outburst, Gerd von Rundstedt was sacked as Oberbefehlshaber West and replaced by Günther von Kluge.
- German submarine U-543 was sunk southwest of Tenerife by a Grumman TBF Avenger.
- The Razor's Edge by W. Somerset Maugham topped the New York Times Fiction Best Sellers list.

== July 3, 1944 (Monday) ==
- The Battle of Imphal ended in Allied victory.
- Minsk, the last big German base on Soviet soil, fell to the 3rd Belorussian Front.
- German submarine U-154 was depth charged and sunk in the Atlantic Ocean by two U.S. destroyer escorts and aircraft.
- The Allies enter Siena.
- Born: Michel Polnareff, singer-songwriter, in Nérac, France

== July 4, 1944 (Tuesday) ==
- The Minsk Offensive and Polotsk Offensive ended in Soviet victories.
- Canadian forces began Operation Windsor, an offensive to take Carpiquet.
- The Battle of Vuosalmi began.
- No. 617 Squadron RAF attacked V-1 flying bomb facilities in a large cave at Saint-Leu-d'Esserent north of Paris.
- Japanese submarine I-10 was sunk east of Saipan by destroyer USS David W. Taylor and destroyer escort USS Riddle.
- Johannes Frießner replaced Georg Lindemann as commander of Army Group North.
- To celebrate American Independence Day, General Omar Bradley ordered all artillery units in the US First Army to open fire on the German lines precisely at noon. Some units fired red, white, and blue smoke shells at the Germans.

== July 5, 1944 (Wednesday) ==
- The Soviets began the Belostock Offensive, Šiauliai Offensive and Vilnius Offensive as part of Operation Bagration.
- Operation Windsor ended in Allied victory.
- The Kriegsmarine lost three submarines (U-233, U-390 and U-586) to enemy action in a single day.
- Japanese destroyer Usugumo was torpedoed and sunk in the Sea of Okhotsk by the U.S. submarine Skate.

== July 6, 1944 (Thursday) ==
- The Polish Home Army began Operation Ostra Brama, an armed uprising against Nazi occupiers in Wilno as part of Operation Tempest.
- Hungarian Regent Miklós Horthy ordered a halt to the deportation of Hungarian Jews.
- The Hartford circus fire occurred when a fire broke out in a tent during a Ringling Bros. and Barnum & Bailey Circus performance in Hartford, Connecticut. 167 people died in one of the worst fire disasters in U.S. history.
- Winston Churchill gave a speech in the House of Commons about the V-1 campaign, revealing government figures that 2,752 had been killed and 8,000 injured by the flying bombs.
- Jackie Robinson was placed under arrest in quarters for refusing to move to the back of a military bus. He would be court-martialed but eventually acquitted in a trial on August 2.
- Died: Andrée Borrel, 24, Vera Leigh, 41, Sonya Olschanezky, 20, and Diana Rowden, 29, French Resistance fighters (killed at Natzweiler-Struthof concentration camp); Chūichi Nagumo, 57, Japanese admiral (suicide)

== July 7, 1944 (Friday) ==
- Regent of Hungary Miklós Horthy ordered a stop to the deportation of Jews from the country. Even so, the Nazis declared all of Hungary except for Budapest free of Jews.
- Japanese destroyer Tamanani was torpedoed and sunk off Manila by the American submarine Mingo.
- German submarine U-678 was sunk in the English Channel by Allied warships.
- The horror film The Mummy's Ghost starring Lon Chaney Jr. was released.
- The largest banzai charge on 7 July 1944 at the Battle of Saipan
- Died: Georges Mandel, 59, French journalist, politician and French Resistance leader (executed by the Milice)

== July 8, 1944 (Saturday) ==
- British and Canadian forces launched Operation Charnwood with the goal of at least partially capturing the city of Caen, which remained in German hands despite repeated attempts to take it over the past month.
- With the Red Army approaching, SS authorities began liquidating the Kovno Ghetto. About 8,000 Jews would be transferred to Stutthof and Dachau.
- German submarine U-243 was depth charged and sunk in the Bay of Biscay by a Short Sunderland patrol bomber of No. 10 Squadron RAAF.
- Born: Jeffrey Tambor, actor, in San Francisco, California
- Died: George B. Seitz, 56, American playwright, actor, screenwriter and director; Takeo Takagi, 52, Japanese admiral

== July 9, 1944 (Sunday) ==
- The Battle of Saipan ended in U.S. victory.
- Operation Charnwood ended in Allied victory.
- The Battle of Tali-Ihantala ended in Finnish defensive victory.
- The Battle of Saint-Lô began.

== July 10, 1944 (Monday) ==
- Because of the danger of the German flying bombs, over 41,000 mothers and children left London in the second wartime exodus from the city and returned to their former wartime billets in the country.
- The Battle of Vyborg Bay ended in defensive victory for the German/Finnish forces.
- The Battle of Driniumor River began near Aitape in New Guinea.
- The Axis troopship SS Duilio was sunk at Trieste by Allied aircraft.

== July 11, 1944 (Tuesday) ==
- The new German Tiger II heavy tank saw frontline combat for the first time during the Normandy campaign.
- German submarine U-1222 was sunk west of La Rochelle by a Short Sunderland patrol bomber of No. 201 Squadron RAF.
- The 12th Major League Baseball All-Star Game was played at Forbes Field in Pittsburgh. The National League beat the American League 7-1.
- Died: Gerald L. Endl, 28, American soldier and posthumous recipient of the Medal of Honor (killed in action near Anamo, New Guinea)

== July 12, 1944 (Wednesday) ==
- The Soviet 1st Baltic Front captured Idritsa.
- The U.S. 88th Division in Italy took Lajatico.
- Died: Theodore Roosevelt Jr., 56, American politician, business leader and brigadier general (heart attack)

== July 13, 1944 (Thursday) ==
- The Vilnius Offensive ended in Soviet victory.
- Soviet forces began the Lvov–Sandomierz Offensive.
- The Allied Raid on Symi began during the Mediterranean Campaign.
- The Nazis burn down the hospital in the Kovno Ghetto, killing hundreds of patients, among them Avraham Grodzinski
- Born: Ernő Rubik, inventor and architect, in Budapest, Hungary
- Died: Avraham Grodzinski, Polish Rabbi, mashgiach ruchani of the Slabodka yeshiva in Lithuania

== July 14, 1944 (Friday) ==
- Operation Ostra Brama ended in victory for the Polish Home Army when the German occupiers in Wilno were defeated, but the following day the Soviet NKVD entered the city and proceeded to intern the Polish fighters and arrest their officers.
- Soviet forces captured Pinsk.
- 28 prisoners revolted at La Santé Prison in Paris. All were shot.
- German submarine U-415 struck a mine and sank in the Bay of Biscay off Brest.
- Born: Aad Mansveld, footballer, in The Hague, Netherlands (d. 1991)
- Died: Asmahan, 31, Arab Druze singer and actress (drowned after a car accident in a canal in Mansoura, Egypt)

== July 15, 1944 (Saturday) ==
- The Raid on Symi ended in Allied victory.
- The Second Battle of the Odon began as part of the Battle of Normandy.
- The Battle of Nietjärvi began.
- German submarine U-319 was depth charged and sunk in the North Sea by a B-24 of No. 206 Squadron RAF.
- Born: Jan-Michael Vincent, actor, in Denver, Colorado (d. 2019)
- Died: Joseph Sadi-Lecointe, 53, French aviator (died from torture by the Gestapo)

== July 16, 1944 (Sunday) ==
- Adolf Hitler departed Berchtesgaden for what would be the final time as he flew to the Wolf's Lair.
- Soviet forces captured Grodno.
- The British Eighth Army in Italy captured Arezzo.
- Born: Angharad Rees, actress, in Edgware, England (d. 2012)

== July 17, 1944 (Monday) ==
- The Second Battle of the Odon ended in operational Allied success.
- The Battle of Vuosalmi and Battle of Nietjärvi both ended in Finnish victory.
- Action of 17 July 1944: The Japanese submarine I-166 was sunk in the Strait of Malacca by the British submarine Telemachus.
- The Port Chicago disaster occurred when a munitions explosion on a cargo vessel in Port Chicago, California killed 320 people.
- German field marshal Erwin Rommel was seriously wounded when a Spitfire strafed his staff car near Livarot. Numerous Allied pilots claimed credit for the attack that knocked Rommel out of the war, but following the 2004 publicization of a Canadian historian's research into the incident, the Canadian Forces officially attribute the feat to Charley Fox of the RCAF.
- The British executed Operation Mascot, a British carrier air raid against the German battleship Tirpitz anchored in northern Norway. but the attempt was unsuccessful.
- German submarine U-347 was depth charged and sunk in the Norwegian Sea by a B-24 of No. 86 Squadron RAF.
- German submarine U-361 was depth charged and sunk west of Narvik by a PBY Catalina of No. 210 Squadron RAF.
- The British government announced plans to build between 3 and 4 million houses in the decade following the end of the war.
- Born: Mark Burgess, cricketer, in Auckland, New Zealand
- Died: William James Sidis, mathematical prodigy, in Boston, Massachusetts, United States

== July 18, 1944 (Tuesday) ==
- Soviet forces began the Lublin–Brest Offensive as part of Operation Bagration.
- German submarine U-672 was depth charged and sunk north of Guernsey by the British frigate Balfour.
- Born: William Harrison Courtney, American professor and retired diplomat
- Died: Rex Whistler, 39, British artist (killed in action in Normandy)

== July 19, 1944 (Wednesday) ==
- The Battle of Verrières Ridge began as part of the Battle of Normandy.
- The U.S. Fifth Army captured the Italian port city of Livorno.
- Japanese cruiser Ōi was torpedoed and sunk in the South China Sea by American submarine Flasher.
- The 1944 Democratic National Convention opened in Chicago, Illinois.

== July 20, 1944 (Thursday) ==
- An annular solar eclipse was visible in Asia, and was the 35th solar eclipse of Solar Saros 135.
- 20 July Plot: An attempt was made to assassinate Adolf Hitler, perpetrated by Claus von Stauffenberg and other conspirators within the German military. At 12:42 p.m. during a conference at the Wolf's Lair, a bomb that Stauffenberg had concealed inside a briefcase went off, killing a stenographer and leaving three officers with fatal injuries. The others in the room, including Hitler himself, were wounded but survived.
- Stauffenberg flew to Berlin to carry out the next step of the military coup, but the plan stalled when he was unable to get confirmation that Hitler was dead. A radio broadcast at 6:30 p.m. reported that Hitler had survived and the situation became increasingly confused. By the end of the day the coup had failed and Hitler loyalists began arresting the conspirators.
- A few minutes past four in the afternoon, Benito Mussolini arrived at the train station of the Wolf's Lair as scheduled and was surprised to see Hitler with his right arm in a sling. After learning of what had happened Mussolini was unsure of what he should do and considered leaving immediately, but he went ahead with his requests that included two Italian divisions to be sent from Germany and a pardon for four Italian naval officers who had just been condemned to death. Hitler, convinced that his remarkable escape was a sure sign of victory, was in a gracious mood and agreed to grant Mussolini almost everything he'd asked for. It would be the final meeting between the two dictators.
- The Battle of Auvere began as part of the larger Battle of Narva on the Eastern Front.
- Franklin D. Roosevelt addressed the Democratic National Convention after being nominated for an unprecedented fourth presidential term. Speaking from the naval base in San Diego, he said his decision to accept the nomination was "based solely on a sense of obligation to serve if called upon to do so by the people of the United States." The president also said he would "not campaign, in the usual sense, for the office. In these days of tragic sorrow, I do not consider it fitting. And besides, in these days of global warfare, I shall not be able to find the time. I shall, however, feel free to report to the people the facts about matters of concern to them and especially to correct any misrepresentations."
- British destroyer Isis struck a mine and sank off Normandy.
- The epic drama film Since You Went Away starring Claudette Colbert, Jennifer Jones, Joseph Cotten and Shirley Temple had its world premiere at the Capitol Theatre in New York City.
- Born: Mel Daniels, Hall of Fame basketball player, in Detroit, Michigan (d. 2015)
- Died: Mildred Harris, 42, American film actress

== July 21, 1944 (Friday) ==
- At 1 a.m., Hitler gave a speech over the radio to prove to the German people that he was still alive after the previous day's attempt on his life. He declared that the conspirators would be "exterminated quite mercilessly." The first execution of conspirators had taken place just after midnight. German troops poured into Berlin.
- Heinz Guderian succeeded Kurt Zeitzler as Chief of Staff of the German Army.
- The Battle of Guam began in the Pacific War.
- German submarine U-212 was depth-charged and sunk south of Brighton off the south coast of England by British warships.
- Democratic vice presidential nomination of 1944: On the final day of the Democratic National Convention in Chicago, Harry S. Truman won the vice presidential nomination due to dissatisfaction among party leaders with the incumbent Vice President Henry A. Wallace. Wallace won the first ballot, but on the second vote the supporters of William O. Douglas switched their support to Truman. Truman came to the podium and gave one of the shortest acceptance speeches on record, lasting less than a minute.
- Born: Paul Wellstone, politician, in Washington, D.C. (d. 2002)
- Died: Ludwig Beck, 64, German general and member of the 20 July bomb plot (shot by a German sergeant after his suicide attempt only severely wounded himself); Heinz Brandt, 37, German Wehrmacht staff officer (died of wounds sustained in the 20 July bomb plot); Albrecht Mertz von Quirnheim, 39, German colonel (executed by firing squad for his involvement in the 20 July plot); Claus von Stauffenberg, 36, German army officer and leading member of the 20 July plot (executed)

== July 22, 1944 (Saturday) ==
- Kuniaki Koiso replaced Hideki Tojo as Prime Minister of Japan.
- The Soviet-controlled Polish Committee of National Liberation was officially proclaimed in Chelm.
- Majdanek concentration camp was liberated by the Red Army, the first concentration camp to be liberated by Allied forces. The Soviet advance was so rapid that the SS fled before evidence of what went on in the camp could be destroyed. When Soviet officials invited journalists to the site, the full extent of Nazi atrocities began to be known to the world.
- The United Nations Monetary and Financial Conference concluded in New Hampshire.
- Died: Günther Korten, 45, German Colonel General and Chief of the General Staff of the Luftwaffe (died of injuries sustained in the 20 July bomb plot)

== July 23, 1944 (Sunday) ==
- The Lwów Uprising, an armed insurrection of the Home Army in Poland against the Nazi German occupiers, began in the city of Lwów.
- The Soviet 3rd Baltic Front captured Pskov and drove the Germans completely from RSFSR soil.
- Heinrich Himmler launched a manhunt to catch the conspirators in the 20 July Bomb Plot.
- Ferdinand Schörner replaced Johannes Frießner as commander of Army Group North.
- Born: Alex Buzo, playwright and author, in Sydney, Australia (d. 2006)

== July 24, 1944 (Monday) ==
- The Battle of Saint-Lô ended in Allied victory.
- The Battle of Tinian began in the Mariana Islands.
- The Soviets began another Narva Offensive.
- A British air raid at Kiel damaged the German submarine U-239, which never returned to active service.

== July 25, 1944 (Tuesday) ==
- The Battle of Auvere in Estonia ended in German defensive victory.
- The Battle of Tannenberg Line began on the Eastern Front.
- The Battle of Verrières Ridge in France ended in German defensive success.
- The United States Army began Operation Cobra in Normandy.
- II Canadian Corps began Operation Spring, an offensive south of Caen.
- Operation Gaff: Six British commandos parachuted into German-occupied Orléans, France with the aim of killing or kidnapping German field marshal Erwin Rommel. When they learned that Rommel had already been injured they moved toward advancing U.S. Army lines on foot.
- Hitler named Joseph Goebbels "Reich Plenipotentiary for the Total War Effort".
- Died: Lesley J. McNair, 61, U.S. Army officer (killed by friendly fire in Normandy); Jakob von Uexküll, 79, Baltic German biologist

== July 26, 1944 (Wednesday) ==
- The Battle for Narva Bridgehead ended after almost six months when German forces withdrew.
- The Battle of Ilomantsi began.
- President Roosevelt gathered his Pacific commanders at Pearl Harbor for a two-day conference on strategy in the Pacific. Douglas MacArthur supported an advance on the Philippines while Chester Nimitz argued for making Formosa the first priority. Roosevelt listened impartially and made no decision at the time.
- Japanese submarine I-29 was torpedoed and sunk in the Balintang Channel by the American submarine USS Sawfish.
- U.S. submarine Robalo struck a mine and sank west of Palawan Island. Four survivors who swam ashore were captured by Japanese Military Police, evacuated by a Japanese destroyer and never seen again. Robalo's Commander Manning Kimmel, son of Admiral Husband E. Kimmel, is among those whose fate remains unknown.
- German submarine U-214 was depth charged and sunk in the English Channel by the British frigate Cooke.
- German submarine U-2323 struck a mine and sank off Kiel.
- Died: Takakazu Kinashi, 42, Japanese submarine commander (killed in the sinking of the I-29); Reza Shah, 66, Shah of Iran from 1925 to 1941

== July 27, 1944 (Thursday) ==
- The Lwów Uprising ended in Polish victory and the liberation of the city from the Nazis, although the Polish fighters would shortly afterwards be arrested by the invading Soviets.
- The Gloster Meteor, the first British jet fighter and the Allies' only operational jet aircraft of the war, entered active service with No. 616 Squadron RAF.
- The Belostock Offensive ended in Soviet victory.
- Operation Spring ended in German tactical success but Allied strategic victory.
- The Soviet submarine V-1 (formerly HMS Sunfish) was bombed and sunk off Norway by an RAF Liberator when she dived instead of firing recognition signals that the submarine was friendly.

== July 28, 1944 (Friday) ==
- The first objective of Operation Cobra was met when the U.S. 4th Armored Division took Coutances.
- The Red Army began the Kaunas Offensive as part of Operation Bagration.
- The rocket-powered German Messerschmitt Me 163 Komet fighter plane saw its first active combat.

== July 29, 1944 (Saturday) ==
- Radio Moscow broadcast appeals from Polish communists for Warsaw to rise up against the German occupiers.
- During the Battle of Guam, the U.S. III Amphibious Corps captured Orote Peninsula, including an airstrip.
- Died: Hans Collani, 36, German SS officer (committed suicide as his command post was being overrun by the Red Army); Bin Uehara, 35, Japanese popular music singer and soldier (killed in action in New Guinea)

== July 30, 1944 (Sunday) ==
- The Narva July Offensive ended in Soviet victory.
- The Battle of Sansapor began when U.S. forces made amphibious landings around Sansapor, Dutch New Guinea.
- During the Battle of Normandy the British Army began Operation Bluecoat with the goal of capturing Vire and Mont Pinçon.
- German submarine U-250 was depth charged and sunk in the Gulf of Finland by the Soviet submarine chaser M-103.
- Died: Lee Powell, 36, American actor

== July 31, 1944 (Monday) ==
- Operation Cobra ended in an Allied victory.
- The Battle of Noemfoor ended in an Allied victory.
- Soviet forces reached Praga, a district of Warsaw on the east bank of the Vistula.
- Soviet forces in the north reached the Gulf of Riga, cutting off German Army Group North, which could now only be resupplied by sea.
- German submarine U-333 was sunk in the Atlantic Ocean west of the Isles of Scilly by British warships.
- Born: Geraldine Chaplin, actress and daughter of Charlie Chaplin and Oona O'Neill, in Santa Monica, California; Robert C. Merton, economist and Nobel laureate, in New York City
- Died: Antoine de Saint-Exupéry, 44, French writer, poet, aristocrat, journalist and pilot (disappeared during a reconnaissance flight of southern France)
