= 1944 Special Honours =

British government recognitions

As part of the British honours system, Special Honours are issued at the Monarch's pleasure at any given time. The Special Honours refer to the awards made within royal prerogative, operational honours and other honours awarded outside the New Years Honours and Birthday Honours

== Victoria Cross (VC) ==
- Flying Officer John Alexander Cruickshank (126700), Royal Air Force Volunteer Reserve. No. 210 Squadron.

== Order of the British Empire ==
=== Officers (OBE) ===
- Squadron Leader John Harvey Curry, D.F.C. (Can/C.2645), Royal Canadian Air Force.

== Distinguished Service Order (DSO) ==
- Acting Wing Commander Douglas Iveson, D.F.C. (86384), R.A.F.V.R., 76 Sqn.
- Acting Wing Commander Denis Graham Smallwood, D.F.C. (40645), R .A .F .O .
- Acting Wing Commander John Groves Topham, D.F.C. (41882) R.A.F.O., 125 Sqn.

== Distinguished Flying Cross (DSC) ==
=== Bar to the Distinguished Flying Cross ===
- Flight Lieutenant Joseph Berry, D.F.C. (118435), R.A.F.V.R.

=== Distinguished Flying Cross ===
- Acting Squadron Leader Robert Durham Rutter (42574), R.A.F., 263 Sqn.
- Flight Lieutenant Thomas Condon (Aus. 404399), R.A.A.F., 456 (R.A.A.F.) Sqn.
- Flight Lieutenant Stanley Herbert Ross Cotterill (Can/J.4874), R.C.A.F., 418 (R.C.A.F.) Sqn.
- Flight Lieutenant Charles Henry Lattimer (N.Z.403964), R.N.Z.A.F., 234 Sqn.
- Acting Flight Lieutenant John Barrie Purkis (158700), R.A.F.V.R., 263 Sqn.
- Flying Officer Stanley Harry Hatsell (151901), R.A.F.V.R., 605 Sqn.
- Flying Officer Harold Medd Proctor (159873), R.A.F.V.R:, 263 Sqn.
- Flying Officer James Davidson Wright (Can/J.24659), R.C.A.F., 418 (R.C.A.F.) Sqn.
- Pilot Officer Mervin Harold Sims (85710), R.A.F.V.R. 418 (R.C.A.F.) Sqn.
- Pilot Officer James David Sharples (Can/J.19986), R.C.A.F. 418 (R.C.A.F.) Sqn.
- Pilot Officer Leonard Pappas (Can/J.85738), R.C.A.F. 12 Sqn.

== Air Force Cross (AFC) ==
=== Bar to the Air Force Cross ===
- Acting Squadron Leader George Cowdery Webb, A.F.C. (81613), R.A.F.V.R.

=== Air Force Cross ===
- Group Captain Howard Ford (05181), R.A.F.
- Acting Group Captain Donald Osborne Finlay, D.F.C. (36031), R.A.F.
- Wing Commander Thomas Anthony Jefferson (29109), R.A.F.O.
- Wing Commander Allon Richard Wright, D.F.C. (33499), R.A.F
- Acting Wing Commander Harold Hamlyn Burnell (39299), R.A.F.O.
- Acting Wing Commander Leslie Jack Dixon (70184). R.A.F.O.
- Acting Wing Commander Ronald James Hardy, D.F.C. (63461), R.A.F.V.R.
- Acting Wing Commander Henry Egbert Hopkins, D.F.C. (39170), R.A.F.O.
- Acting Wing Commander Donald Stanley Richardson (73586), R.A.F.V.R.
- Squadron Leader Douglas Ian Benham, D.F.C. (104443), R.A.F.V.R.
- Squadron Leader Basil Francis Fitz-Gibbon (41571), R.A.F.
- Squadron Leader Robert Benvie Fleming (41572), R.A.F.O.
- Squadron Leader Frank John French, D.F.C. (72120), R.A.F.V.R.
- Squadron Leader Peter Cotton Hordern (70326), R.A.F.O.
- Squadron Leader Clarles George Buchanan McClure (70418), R.A.F.O.
- Squadron Leader Charles Norman McVeigh (40243), R.A.F.O.
- Squadron Leader William Edward Geoffrey Measures (33198), R.A.F.
- Squadron Leader John Alexander Millar (41446), R.A.F.O.
- Squadron Leader Harold Ian Rust (41211), R.A.F.O.
- Squadron Leader Aerhur Patrick Smallman, D.S.O. (88043), R.A.F.V.R.
- Squadron Leader Leslie Eric Bradley Stonhill (28237), R.A.F.O.
- Acting Squadron Leader Douglas Birkett (88681), R.A.F.V.R.
- Acting Squadron Leader Robert Whitworth Brown (43058), R.A.F.
- Acting Squadron Leader Harold William Burr (120978), R A F.V.R.
- Acting Squadron Leader William Renshaw Dibb (85258), R.A.FV.R.
- Acting Squadron Leader John Robert Donald (114253), R.A.F.V.R.
- Acting Squadron Leader Antony George Anson Fisher (73708), R.A.F.V.R.
- Acting Squadron Leader Ernest George Fraser, M.V.O. (43066), R.A.F.
- Acting Squadron Leader Stanley Robert Hyland (44978), R.A.F.
- Acting Squadron Leader Edward Albert Hood (87637), R.A.F.V.R.
- Acting Squadron Leader Vincent Hughes (125761), R.A.F.V.R.
- Acting Squadron Leader Edwin Shaw Kennedy (108023), R.A.F.V.R.
- Acting Squadron Leader Mervyn Leyshon (103502), R.A.F.V.R.
- Acting Squadron Leader Cecil George Loader (51268), R.A.F.
- Acting Squadron Leader Charles John Mackenzie, D.F.C, (91223), A.A.F.
- Acting Squadron Leader James Cosmo Melville (74681), R.A.F.V.R.
- Acting Squadron Leader Freeman Marshal Osborn, D.F.C. (44734), R.A.F.
- Acting Squadron Leader Ronald Philip Priest (41802), R.A.F.
- Acting Squadron Leader Kenneth Arthur Russell (112317), R.A.F.V.R.
- Acting Squadron Leader Roy Charles Edwin Scott (36250), R.A.F.
- Acting Squadron Leader Harold Shields, D.F.C, D.S.M, (47713), R.A.F.
- Acting Squadron Leader Kenneth Searby Stammers , D.F.C, D.S.M, (65989), R.A.F.V.R.
- Acting Squadron Leader William Vale (44068), R.A.F.
- Acting Squadron Leader Trevor Sidney Wade (78984), R.A.F.V.R.
- Acting Squadron Leader Bruce Hugh Williams, D.F.C. (62880), R.A.F.V.R.
- Flight Lieutenant Victor John Dennis Baker (123061), R.A.F.V.R.
- Flight Lieutenant John Burningham (87405), R.A.F.V.R
- Flight Lieutenant Robert Leslie Chidlaw-Roberts, M.C. (122393), R.A.F.V.R.
- Flight Lieutenant Thomas Patrick Cowslip (100595), R.A.F.V.R.
- Flight Lieutenant Robert Bird Ferry (116880), R.A.F.V.R.
- Flight Lieutenant Alfred James Hartley (45458). R.A.F.
- Flight Lieutenant Joseph Hamilton Wingate Hill (78727), R.A.F.V.R.
- Flight Lieutenant Edgar Leonard Killip (119653). R.A.F.V.R.
- Flight Lieutenant Henry Mitchell, A.F.M (70906), R.A.F.O.
- Flight Lieutenant James Cotton Martin Mountford (42631), R.A.F.
- Flight Lieutenant Leo Norris (61380), R.A.F.V.R.
- Flight Lieutenant Ernest Wilfred Pearson (126547), R.A.F.V.R.
- Flight Lieutenant Kenneth Walter Thomas Pugh (46924). R.A.F.
- Flight Lieutenant Oswald Etienne Rotherham (115892), R.A.F.V.R.
- Flight Lieutenant Lawrence Shackman (78858), R A.F.V.R.
- Flight Lieutenant John Stevenson Sams (82705), R.A.F.V.R.
- Flight Lieutenant George Frederick Hind Sayers, D.F.C. (50457). R.A.F.
- Flight Lieutenant Bernard Chad Smith (123863), R.A.F.V.R.
- Flight Lieutenant Ralph Thomas Stokes (87031), R.A.F.V.R.
- Flight Lieutenant John Raymond Vallance (117403), R.A.F.V.R.
- Flight Lieutenant Rudyard Anstiss Whitehead (70732), R.A.F.O.
- Flight Lieutenant Jack Williams (124667), R.A.F.V.R.
- Flight Lieutenant Wilfred Cedric Wilson (130108), R.A.F.V.R.
- Flight Lieutenant Rupert Gerald Woodcraft (44359), R.A.F.
- Acting Flight Lieutenant Frederick Arthur Haden (133995), R.A.F.V.R.
- Acting Flight Lieutenant Harry Snow Newton (I3475O), R.A.F.V.R.
- Acting Flight Lieutenant Eric Walker (142553). R.A.F.V.R.
- Acting Flight Lieutenant Gilbert Gordon George Walters (129147), R.A.F.V.R.
- Acting Flight Lieutenant Frederic Bruce Ryan Wilson (130809), R.A.F.V.R.
- Flying Officer George Edward Brown (148173), R.A.F.V.R.
- Flying Officer John Douglas Christian (51741), R.A.F.
- Flying Officer Ronald Edmond, D.F.C. (129960), R.A.F.V.R.
- Flying Officer Aubrey Howard Fernihough, D.F.C. (134506). R.A.F.V.R.
- Flying Officer Ian Ferguson Glover (134105), R.A.F.V.R.
- Flying Officer John Adam Henderson (148909), R.A.F.V.R.
- Flying Officer Robert Clark Horn (170724), R.A.F.V.R.
- Flying Officer Reginald Lister Jackson (169029), R.A.F.V.R.
- Flying Officer Alfred Edgar Jones (159658), R.A.F.V.R.
- Flying Officer Harry Francis Marks (161258), R.A.F.V.R.
- Flying Officer Dudley Vernon Sterner (125755), R.A.F.V.R.
- Flying Officer John West (157086), R.A.F.V.R.
- Pilot Officer Hubert Edward Fryer (175663), R.A.F.V.R.
- Warrant Officer Herbert Henry Binns (655539). R.A.F.
- Warrant Officer Lawrence Douglas Eastment (523017), R.A.F.
- Warrant Officer Bruce Pollard (564996), R.A.F.
- Warrant Officer Edward Willoughby Warren (528277), R.A.F.

=== Royal Australian Air Force ===
- Acting Squadron Leader James Clark (402439).
- Flying Officer John Ross Walker Christensen (Aus. 402224).
- Flying Officer Lawrance Lloyd Maundrell (Aus.402128).
- Warrant Officer Arthur Cannavan (Aus. 414336).

=== Royal Canadian Air Force ===
- Squadron Leader Robert Fred Miller (Can/J.15481).
- Flight Lieutenant Lloyd Hubert Warriner (Can/J.5337).
- Flight Lieutenant Lloyd Hubert Warriner (Can/J.5337).
- Acting Flight Lieutenant Clark Kitchener Burlingham (Can/J.8081).
- Acting Flight Lieutenant Richard Ewart Laird (Can/J.15630).
- Flying Officer Paul Alexander Mick (Can/J.22716).

=== Royal New Zealand Air Force ===
- Acting Flight Lieutenant Arthur Percy Gainsford, D.F.C. (N.Z.402863).
- Flying Officer Gordon David Hudson (N.Z.413419).
- Flying Officer Digby Disire Burdett (N.Z.42541).

=== South African Air Force ===
- Major Pierre Simond Joubert (129204)
- Captain Vivian Septimus Muir (83638).

== George Medal (GM) ==
- Flight Lieutenant Alfred George Spencer (89044), Royal Air Force Volunteer Reserve.
- Flying Officer Albert Arthur (145518), Royal Air Force Volunteer Reserve.

== Distinguished Flying Medal (DSM) ==
- Can/R.162554 Flight Sergeant Norman Russell Modeland, R.C.A.F. 90 Sqn.

== Air Force Medal (AFM) ==
- Flight Sergeant 1433271 Frank Barwise, R.A.F.V.R.
- Flight Sergeant 1532117 John Bennett, R.A.F.V.R.
- Flight Sergeant 542290 Basil John Chacksfield, R.A.F.
- Flight Sergeant 1025983 William James McEwan Conley (now Pilot Officer), R.A.F.V.R.
- Flight Sergeant 1393384 Sydney Frank Cooke, R.A.F.V.R.
- Flight Sergeant 1322342 John Birchall Harrison, R.A.F.V.R.
- Flight Sergeant 1124606 John Hickey, R.A.F.V.R.
- Flight Sergeant 1097954 Edward Imison, R.A.F.V.R.
- Flight Sergeant 524776 William Thomas Aldridge, R.A.F.
- Flight Sergeant 519865 Eric Newton Scott, R.A.F.
- Flight Sergeant 657648 Frederick George Tanner, R.A.F.
- Flight Sergeant 1334888 John Eric Tibbles, R.A.F.V.R.
- Sergeant 543813 Harold Charles Baker Bright, R.A.F.
- Corporal 935800 Anthony Andrew Morton, R.A.F.V.R.
- Leading Aircraftman 1119811 Robert Ritchie Coull, R.A.F.V.R.
- Leading Aircraftman 1031234 Edwin Frederick Gatehouse, R.A.F.V.R.
- Leading Aircraftman 1119890 Robert Leaswood Jones, R.A.F.V.R.
- Leading Aircraftman 1265018 James Robert Prentice, R.A.F.V.R.

== King's Commendation for Valuable Service in the Air ==
- Squadron Leader J. A. Hankins, A.F.C. (29011), R.A.F.O.
- Squadron Leader D. Redington (41239), R.A.F.
- Acting Squadron Leader R. W. Dodd (41562), R.A.F.
- Acting Squadron Leader L. G. Smith (102090), R.A.F.V.R.
- Acting Squadron Leader W. L. Watson D.F.C. (82659), R.A.F.V.R.
- Acting Squadron Leader T. R. N. Wheatley-Smith (44200), R.A.F.
- Flight Lieutenant H. J. Barron (45191), R.A.F.
- Flight Lieutenant G. D. S. Boole, A.F.C. (124271), R.A.F.V.R.
- Flight Lieutenant R. E. Burton (119757), R.A.F.V.R.
- Flight Lieutenant R. A. Collis, D.F.C. (44067), R.A.F.
- Flight Lieutenant G. M. Gillespie (Can/C.2004), R.C.A.F.
- Flight Lieutenant R. C. Griffin (65494), R.A.F.V.R.
- Flight Lieutenant M. R. N. Jennings, M.C., A.F.C. (82822). R.A.F.V.R.
- Flight Lieutenant D. S. Lord, D.F.C. (49149), R.A.F.
- Flight Lieutenant J. Steere (47746), R.A.F.
- Flight Lieutenant R. K. Webb (46714), R.A.F.
- Acting Flight Lieutenant R. C. Bruce (Aus.412103), R.A.A.F.
- Acting Flight Lieutenant T. Meredith (158112), R.A.F.V.R.
- Acting Flight Lieutenant K. G. Shea (8408707), R.A.A.F.
- Acting Flight Lieutenant E. Wright, D.F.C. (134755), R.A.F.V.R.
- Acting Flight Lieutenant P. I. Burden (129246), R.A.F.V.R.
- Flying Officer C. O. Beck (50554), R.A.F.
- Flying Officer C. Beveridge, A.F.M. (54030), R.A.F.
- Flying Officer H. C. Ferris (135533), R.A.F.V.R.
- Flying Officer J. F. Haffenden (136039), R.A.F.V.R.
- Flying Officer J. H. Lendrum (136175), R.A.F.V.R.
- Flying Officer J. O. Maitland (Can/J.17060), R.C.A.F.
- Flying Officer M. L. Richards (133347), R.A.F.V.R.
- Flying Officer K. Richley (120974), R.A.F.V.R.
- Flying Officer D. V. Robinson (53776), R.A.F.
- Flying Officer J. W. White (142138), R.A.F.V.R.
- Flying Officer L..B. Wyman (Can/J.10613), R.C.A.F.
- Pilot Officer A. Wilkinson (175268), R.A.F.V.R.
- Warrant Officer E.A. Kempton (133157), R.A.F.V.R.
- Warrant Officer J. Proctor (1236275), R.A.F.V.R.
- Flight Sergeant 1538478 T. G. Potter, R.A.F.V.R.
- Flight Sergeant 1292134 H. J. Richardson, R.A.F.V.R.
- Flight Sergeant 1397707 R. S. Tomkins, R.A.F.V.R.
- Flight Sergeant 1393612 S. G. Witherspoon R.A.F.V.R.
