= U-239 =

U239 or U-239 may be:

- German submarine U-239, a German U-boat of World War II
- Uranium-239 (U-239 or ^{239}U), an isotope of uranium
