= June 1944 =

Month of 1944

<<	June 1944					>>
Su	Mo	Tu	We	Th	Fr	Sa
				1	2	3
4	5	6	7	8	9	10
11	12	13	14	15	16	17
18	19	20	21	22	23	24
25	26	27	28	29	30

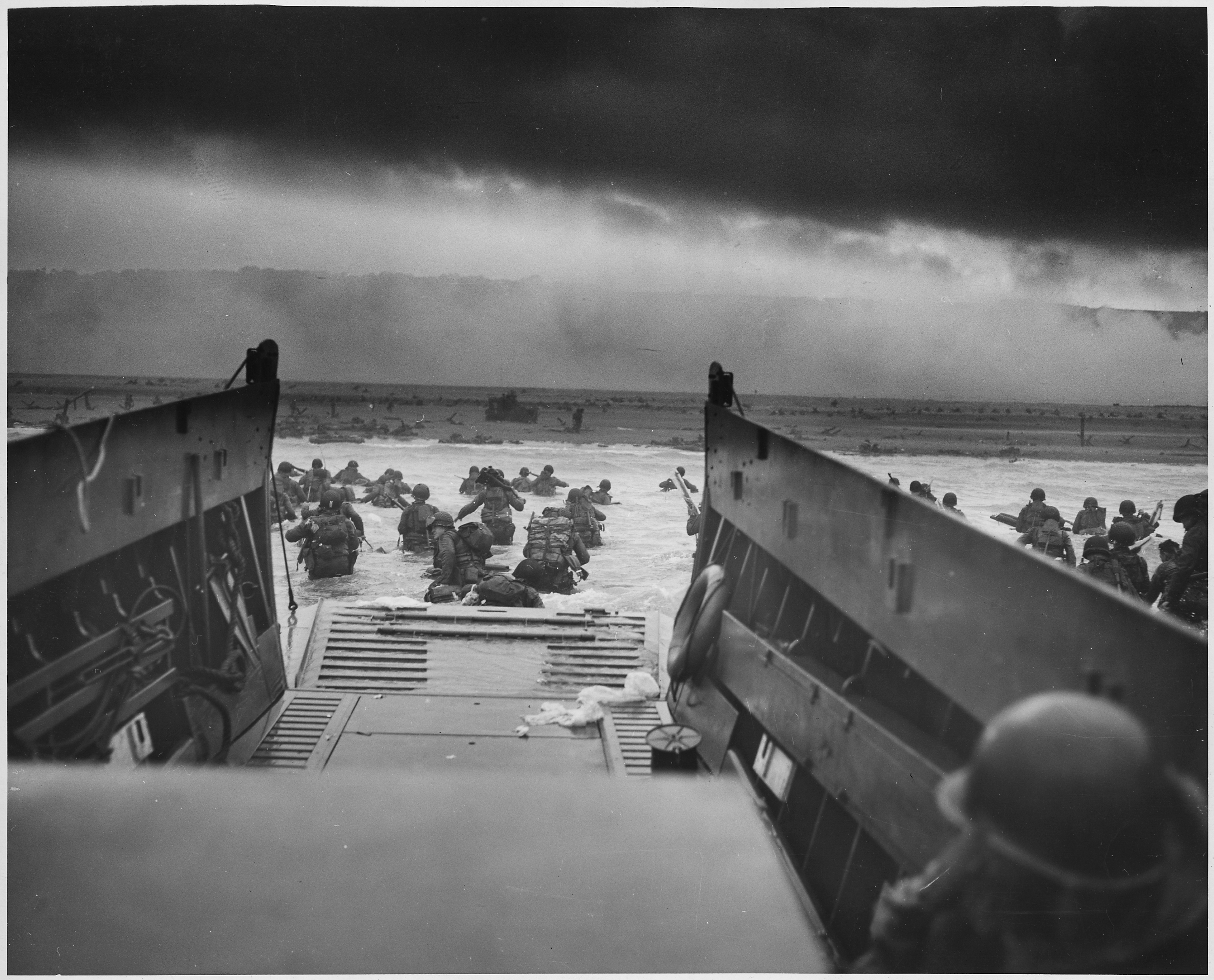
June 6, 1944: Into the Jaws of Death

The following events occurred in June 1944:

== June 1, 1944 (Thursday) ==
- The American submarine Herring was sunk by Japanese coastal batteries on Matua Island.
- British troops captured Frosinone, Italy.
- 60 men of the British 2nd Parachute Brigade began Operation Hasty, a mission behind German lines in Italy.
- Adolf Hitler dissolved the Abwehr and transferred its functions to the Reich Security Main Office under Heinrich Himmler.
- The BBC broadcast a coded message based on the Paul Verlaine poem Chanson d'automne to inform the French Resistance that the invasion of France was imminent. The Germans understood the intent of the message but failed to bring up sufficient forces.
- Two K-class blimps of the United States Navy completed the first transatlantic crossing by non-rigid airships, from the United States to French Morocco, in 80 hours.
- A general election was held in Cuba, in which Ramón Grau was elected president.
- José María Velasco Ibarra became President of Ecuador for the second time.
- Born: Robert Powell, actor, in Salford, Lancashire, England

== June 2, 1944 (Friday) ==
- Allied forces overran the Caesar C line south of Rome. Adolf Hitler ordered Albert Kesselring to abandon the Italian capital.
- First mission of Operation Frantic: Frantic-Joe, shuttle raid from Italy to Russia by the 15th AF
- Representatives of the Soviet Union and Romania secretly met in Stockholm to discuss conditions for Romania's withdrawal from the war.
- The Soham rail disaster occurred in the small town of Soham, Cambridgeshire, England when the cargo of an ammunition train exploded and killed two people.
- Born: Marvin Hamlisch, composer and conductor, in New York City (d. 2012)
- Died: Benoît Broutchoux, 64, French anarchist

== June 3, 1944 (Saturday) ==
- The Allies dropped 8,000 tons of bombs in a raid on German coastal positions around Boulogne.
- U.S. troops took Albano and Frascati on the outskirts of Rome, while Canadian forces took Anagni.
- Kesselring declared Rome an open city.
- German submarine U-477 was depth charged and sunk in the Norwegian Sea by a PBY Catalina of No. 162 Squadron RCAF.
- The Provisional Government of the French Republic was created, succeeding the French Committee of National Liberation as the provisional government of Free France.
- Bounding Home won the Belmont Stakes, depriving Pensive of the U.S. Triple Crown.
- Asperger syndrome was identified for the first time, in a paper by the Austrian pediatrician Hans Asperger.
- Born: Edith McGuire, Olympic gold medalist sprinter, in Atlanta, Georgia

== June 4, 1944 (Sunday) ==
- The Italian capital of Rome fell to the Allies. There was little fighting in the city itself as American tanks rolled along the Appian Way. The Germans ignored Hitler's order to blow up the Tiber bridges before retreating and the city's historic sites were left intact.
- Royal Air Force meteorologist Group Captain James Stagg recommended that Overlord be postponed one day from June 5 to the 6th because of bad weather. Dwight D. Eisenhower followed his advice and postponed D-Day by 24 hours.
- German submarine U-505 was captured off Río de Oro by ships of the U.S. Navy. The sub's codebooks, Enigma machine and other secret materials found on board would be of assistance to Allied codebreakers.
- Born: Michelle Phillips, singer, songwriter, actress and member of The Mamas & the Papas, in Long Beach, California

== June 5, 1944 (Monday) ==
- Operation Forager: The United States Fifth Fleet left Pearl Harbor, sailing for the Marianas Islands.
- Operation Matterhorn began with the first B-29 Superfortress combat mission, the bombing of Bangkok, from airfields in India.
- The Battle of Anzio ended after 136 days in an Allied victory.
- Rome was declared an open city and was occupied by the United States Army.
- King Victor Emmanuel III of Italy transferred most of his remaining constitutional powers to his son Umberto.
- Pope Pius XII spoke to crowds at St. Peter's Basilica giving thanks to God and all belligerents for largely sparing Rome from destruction.
- U.S. President Franklin D. Roosevelt gave a fireside chat on the fall of Rome. "The first of the Axis capitals is now in our hands," Roosevelt said. "One up and two to go!"
- The D-Day naval deceptions began. Allied ships and aircraft made deceptive movements in an attempt to deceive the Germans into believing that the Allied invasion force would land in the Calais region.
- Operation Tonga began at 10:56 p.m. when an Allied force of bombers, gliders and transport aircraft took off from RAF Tarrant Rushton to begin an airborne operation near the city of Caen.
- Born: Colm Wilkinson, singer and actor, in Drimnagh, Ireland
- Died: Józef Beck, 49, Polish foreign minister from 1932 to 1939; Riccardo Zandonai, 61, Italian composer

== June 6, 1944 (Tuesday) ==
- D-Day: Operation Overlord commenced with the crossing of nearly 160,000 Allied troops over the English Channel to land on the beaches of Normandy, France.
- The battle for Pointe du Hoc resulted in Allied victory, while the Battle of Merville Gun Battery was fought to inconclusive result.
- The British executed the capture of the Caen canal and Orne river bridges. This resulted in the first Allied troops to land in Normandy. The same day, British forces also undertook Operation Houndsworth and Operation Mallard.
- The Norwegian destroyer Svenner was sunk off Sword Beach by a German torpedo boat, the only Allied ship to be sunk by German naval activity on D-Day.
- Stanley Hollis earned the only Victoria Cross to be awarded for D-Day.
- War photographer Robert Capa took The Magnificent Eleven D-Day photographs.
- Adolf Hitler was awoken at the Berghof around noon and informed of the Normandy landings. He displayed no outward signs of distress and appeared to be confident that the invasion would be repulsed.
- Winston Churchill announced the Normandy landings in an address to the House of Commons. "I cannot, of course, commit myself to any particular details," Churchill said. "Reports are coming in in rapid succession. So far the Commanders who are engaged report that everything is proceeding according to plan. And what a plan! This vast operation is undoubtedly the most complicated and difficult that has ever occurred ... Nothing that equipment, science or forethought could do has been neglected, and the whole process of opening this great new front will be pursued with the utmost resolution both by the commanders and by the United States and British Governments whom they serve."
- President Roosevelt went on national radio at night to address the nation about the Normandy invasion. The president's address took the form a prayer. It began: "Almighty God: Our sons, pride of our Nation, this day have set upon a mighty endeavor, a struggle to preserve our Republic, our religion, and our civilization, and to set free a suffering humanity. Lead them straight and true; give strength to their arms, stoutness to their hearts, steadfastness in their faith."
- On the Eastern Front, the First Jassy–Kishinev Offensive ended in Soviet failure.
- Operation Rösselsprung concluded. Although the activities of the Yugoslav Partisans were temporarily disrupted by the operation, it failed in its objective of capturing or killing Marshal Josip Broz Tito.
- Japanese destroyer Minazuki was sunk in the Sibutu Passage by the American submarine Harder.
- Born: Edgar Froese, artist and electronic musician, in Tilsit, East Prussia (d. 2015); Bud Harrelson, major league baseball player (mostly for the New York Mets), in Niles, California (d. 2024); Phillip Allen Sharp, geneticist and molecular biologist, in Falmouth, Kentucky; Tommie Smith, track & field athlete and AFL wide receiver, in Clarksville, Texas
- Died: Jimmie W. Monteith, 26, U.S. Army officer and posthumous recipient of the Medal of Honor (killed in action on D-Day); John J. Pinder, Jr., 32, U.S. Army soldier and posthumous recipient of the Medal of Honor (killed in action on D-Day)

== June 7, 1944 (Wednesday) ==
- The Battle of Bréville began.
- The British began Operation Perch, an attempt to encircle and capture the city of Caen.
- Operation Tonga ended in Allied tactical victory.
- Operation Hasty ended with less than half the original force returning safely to British lines.
- The Ardenne Abbey massacre begins. 11 Canadian POWs from The North Nova Scotia Highlanders and The Sherbrooke Fusilers are shot by members of the 12th SS Panzer Division.
- German submarine U-629 was sunk in the English Channel by a B-24 of No. 53 Squadron RAF.
- Japanese destroyer Hayanami became the second ship to be torpedoed and sunk in the Sibutu Passage by USS Harder in as many days.
- American destroyer Meredith struck a mine in the English Channel and was severely damaged. Salvage efforts would be abandoned on June 9 when Luftwaffe bombing broke the ship in two.
- Actress Judy Garland divorced her husband of three years, songwriter David Rose, on grounds of general cruelty.
- The USS Susan B. Anthony struck a mine and sank, all 2,689 people aboard were saved.

== June 8, 1944 (Thursday) ==
- The Battle of Port-en-Bessin ended in Allied victory.
- Pietro Badoglio and the Italian government moved to Rome.
- A B-24 of No. 224 Squadron RAF sank German submarine U-373 in the Bay of Biscay and then sank U-441 only some 20 minutes later in the English Channel.
- Japanese destroyer Harasume was bombed and sunk northwest of Manokwari, New Guinea by a U.S. B-25 Mitchell.
- Japanese destroyer Kazagumo was torpedoed and sunk in Davao Gulf by the American submarine Hake.
- American destroyer escort USS Rich struck a mine and sank off Normandy.
- The war film Days of Glory starring Tamara Toumanova and Gregory Peck (in their feature film debuts) was released.
- The first Tallboy bomb was dropped.
- Born: Mark Belanger, baseball player, in Pittsfield, Massachusetts (d. 1998); Don Grady, actor, composer and musician, in San Diego, California (d. 2012); Marc Ouellet, Cardinal of the Catholic Church, in La Motte, Quebec, Canada; Boz Scaggs, musician, in Canton, Ohio

== June 9, 1944 (Friday) ==
- The Battle of Ushant was fought off the coast of Brittany between German and Allied destroyer flotillas. The result was an Allied victory as the Germans lost 2 destroyers.
- The U.S. Fifth Army in Italy captured Tarquinia and Viterbo.
- German destroyers Z32 and ZH1 engaged Allied warships off the Île de Batz. Z32 ran aground and was wrecked while ZH1 was torpedoed and sunk.
- Japanese destroyer Matsukaze was sunk northeast of Chichijima by the American submarine Swordfish.
- Japanese destroyer Tanikaze was torpedoed and sunk in the Sibutu Passage by the USS Harder.

== June 10, 1944 (Saturday) ==
- The Red Army began the Vyborg–Petrozavodsk Offensive with the objective of knocking Finland out of the war.
- A Waffen-SS company carried out the Oradour-sur-Glane massacre in France, killing 642 residents of the village of Oradour-sur-Glane.
- Waffen-SS forces in Greece carried out the Distomo massacre, killing a total of 214 residents of the village of Distomo in retaliation for a partisan attack upon the unit.
- German submarine U-821 was depth charged and sunk in the Bay of Biscay by British aircraft.
- Pitcher Joe Nuxhall became the youngest player to ever appear in a modern major league baseball game when he made his debut for the Cincinnati Reds at the age of 15 years, 10 months and 11 days. Although Nuxhall had a difficult outing, giving up five runs to the St. Louis Cardinals in two-thirds of an inning, he went on to have a good big-league career as a two-time All-Star with a lifetime record of 135–117.
- "I'll Get By (As Long as I Have You)" by Harry James and His Orchestra hit #1 on the Billboard singles charts.

== June 11, 1944 (Sunday) ==
- In Normandy, the First United States Army captured Carentan and Lison.
- The British frigate HMS Halsted was torpedoed and rendered a constructive total loss off Normandy by German E-boats.
- The American battleship USS Missouri was commissioned.
- Died: Vojtěch Preissig, 70, Czech typographer, illustrator and designer (died in Dachau concentration camp)

== June 12, 1944 (Monday) ==
- U.S. Task Force 58 attacked Japanese facilities and shipping in preparation for the landings on Saipan, sinking one torpedo boat and twelve merchant ships of Japanese convoy CD-4.
- U.S. and British forces in Normandy linked up near Carentan, forming a solid 50-mile (80 km) battlefront with 326,000 men and 54,000 vehicles.
- German submarine U-490 was depth charged and sunk in the Atlantic Ocean by American warships.
- President Roosevelt gave his 30th and final fireside chat, on the subject of the opening of the Fifth War Loan Drive.

== June 13, 1944 (Tuesday) ==
- The Germans launched the first V-1 flying bombs at England. Of the ten fired on this day four reached England, killing six people and destroying a railroad bridge.
- The Battle of Bréville ended in British victory.
- The Battle of Bloody Gulch was fought southwest of Carentan in Normandy, resulting in U.S. victory.
- The Battle of Villers-Bocage was fought in Normandy.
- RAF Bomber Command sent 221 aircraft to bomb Le Havre in its first daylight raid since May 1943. Three torpedo boats, fifteen S-boats, nine minesweepers and eight patrol boats were among the many German ships sunk in the raid.
- The British destroyer Boadicea was bombed and sunk off Portland Bill by the Luftwaffe.
- German submarine U-715 was depth charged and sunk northeast of the Faroe Islands by a PBY Canso of No. 162 Squadron RCAF.
- Born: Ban Ki-moon, 8th Secretary-General of the United Nations, in Injō, Japanese Korea

== June 14, 1944 (Wednesday) ==
- American submarine USS Golet was sunk off Honshu by Japanese ships and aircraft.
- The Battle of Lone Tree Hill began in Netherlands New Guinea between American and Japanese forces.
- The Battle of Porytowe Wzgórze began between Polish and Russian partisans and Nazi German forces.
- Operation Perch ended in British failure.
- Charles de Gaulle visited the Normandy beachhead.
- An RAF Mosquito recorded the first successful shooting down of a V-1 flying bomb over the English Channel.
- Eleanor Roosevelt, the First Lady of the United States, opened the White House Conference on How Women May Share in Post-War Policy-Making.

== June 15, 1944 (Thursday) ==
- The Battle of Saipan began when U.S. forces landed on Saipan in the Mariana Islands.
- Over the night of June 15/16 the United States Army Air Force conducted the Bombing of Yawata, the first air raid on the Japanese home islands since the Doolittle Raid in April 1942.
- The Battle of Porytowe Wzgórze ended in a temporary victory for the Polish and Russian partisan forces.
- RAF Bomber Command sent 297 aircraft to attack Boulogne, sinking three German minesweeping tenders, nine minesweepers, two patrol boats, three tugs and five harbour defense vessels.
- The British frigate Blackwood was torpedoed and damaged off Brittany by German submarine U-764 and foundered the next day off Portland Bill.
- The Co-operative Commonwealth Federation led by Tommy Douglas won the general election in the province of Saskatchewan, marking the first time a socialist government had been elected anywhere in Canada.

== June 16, 1944 (Friday) ==
- The Treaty of Vis was signed in Yugoslavia, in an attempt by the Western Powers to merge the Yugoslav government in exile with the Communist Partisans fighting on the ground. The agreement provided for an interim government until the people could decide the postwar form of government in democratic elections.
- The British Eighth Army in Italy took Foligno and Spoleto.
- Born: Henri Richelet, painter, in Frebécourt, France (d. 2020)
- Died: Marc Bloch, 57, French historian (shot by the Gestapo for his work in the French Resistance); George Stinney, 14, African-American youth wrongly convicted of murder and the youngest person in 20th century U.S. history to be sentenced to death and executed (death by electric chair)

== June 17, 1944 (Saturday) ==
- The Battle of Douvres Radar Station was fought. British 41 Commando, Royal Marines secured the surrender of a German garrison at Douvres-la-Délivrande.
- Iceland formally declared independence from Denmark.
- Born: Bill Rafferty, comedian and impressionist, in Queens, New York (d. 2012)

== June 18, 1944 (Sunday) ==
- British troops captured Assisi, Italy.
- A V-1 flying bomb hit the Guards Chapel of Wellington Barracks during Sunday service and killed 121 people.
- Ivanoe Bonomi replaced Pietro Badoglio as Prime Minister of Italy.
- German submarine U-767 was sunk in the English Channel by British destroyers.
- Born: Rick Griffin, psychedelic artist and underground cartoonist, in Palos Verdes, California (d. 1991)
- Died: Harry Fielding Reid, 85, American geophysicist

== June 19, 1944 (Monday) ==
- The Battle of the Philippine Sea began. On the first day, the Japanese lost two aircraft carriers to American submarines: Shōkaku was torpedoed and sunk by Cavalla, while Taihō was sunk by USS Albacore.
- In a massive coordinated sabotage operation, in preparation of Operation Bagration, 100,000 Soviet partisan guerrillas detonated over 10,000 explosions to the rear of German Army Group Centre positions. Supply and communications were rendered inoperable for days.
- Changsha fell to the Japanese in China.
- A major storm in the English Channel destroyed large parts of the Mulberry harbours and shipping.

== June 20, 1944 (Tuesday) ==
- The Battle of the Philippine Sea ended in American victory. Japanese aircraft carrier Hiyō sunk after fuel vapours ignited from previous damage caused by USS Belleau Wood's air wing, bringing total Japanese losses for the two-day battle to three carriers, two oilers and around 600 aircraft.
- The Soviets captured Viipuri on the Karelian Isthmus.
- Nazi-subordinated Lithuanian Security Police carried out the Glinciszki massacre of 37 mostly Polish residents of the village of Glitiškės.
- TWA Flight 277 en route from Stephenville, Newfoundland to Washington, D.C. crashed on Fort Mountain, Maine. All seven on board were killed.
- British Minister of Production Oliver Lyttelton departed from the prepared text of a speech to the American Chamber of Commerce in London and stated, "Japan was provoked into attacking the Americans at Pearl Harbor. It is a travesty on history to ever say that America was forced into the war. Everyone knows where American sympathies were. It is incorrect to say that America was ever truly neutral even before America came into the war on an all-out fighting basis." These remarks were instantly controversial; U.S. Secretary of State Cordell Hull released a statement that same day calling Lyttelton's comment "entirely in error as to the facts and fails to state the true attitude of the United States both during the earlier stages of military preparation for world conquest by Germany and Japan and during the later aggressions by those two countries. This government from the beginning to the end was actuated by the single policy of self-defense against the rapidly increasing danger to this nation."
- Nazi Germany launches a V-2 rocket that becomes the first man-made object in space during a test launch MW 18014.

== June 21, 1944 (Wednesday) ==
- The British Eighth Army reached the German defensive Trasimene Line in Italy.
- The British destroyer Fury struck a mine off Sword Beach, Normandy and was declared a total loss.
- Oliver Lyttelton rose in the House of Commons to give an "explanation" for his remarks of the previous day. "I was trying, in a parenthesis, to make clear the gratitude which this country feels for the help given to us in the war against Germany, before Japan attacked the United States," Lyttelton said. "The words I used, however, when read textually, and apart from the whole tenor of my speech, seemed to mean that the help given us against Germany provoked Japan to attack. This is manifestly untrue. I want to make it quite clear that I do not complain of being misreported, and any misunderstanding is entirely my own fault. I ask the House to believe, however, that the fault was one of expression and not of intention. I hope this apology will undo any harm that the original words may have caused here or in the United States."
- Born: Ray Davies, rock guitarist, vocalist and songwriter for The Kinks, in Fortis Green, London, England; Tony Scott, film director and producer, in Tynemouth, England (d. 2012)

== June 22, 1944 (Thursday) ==
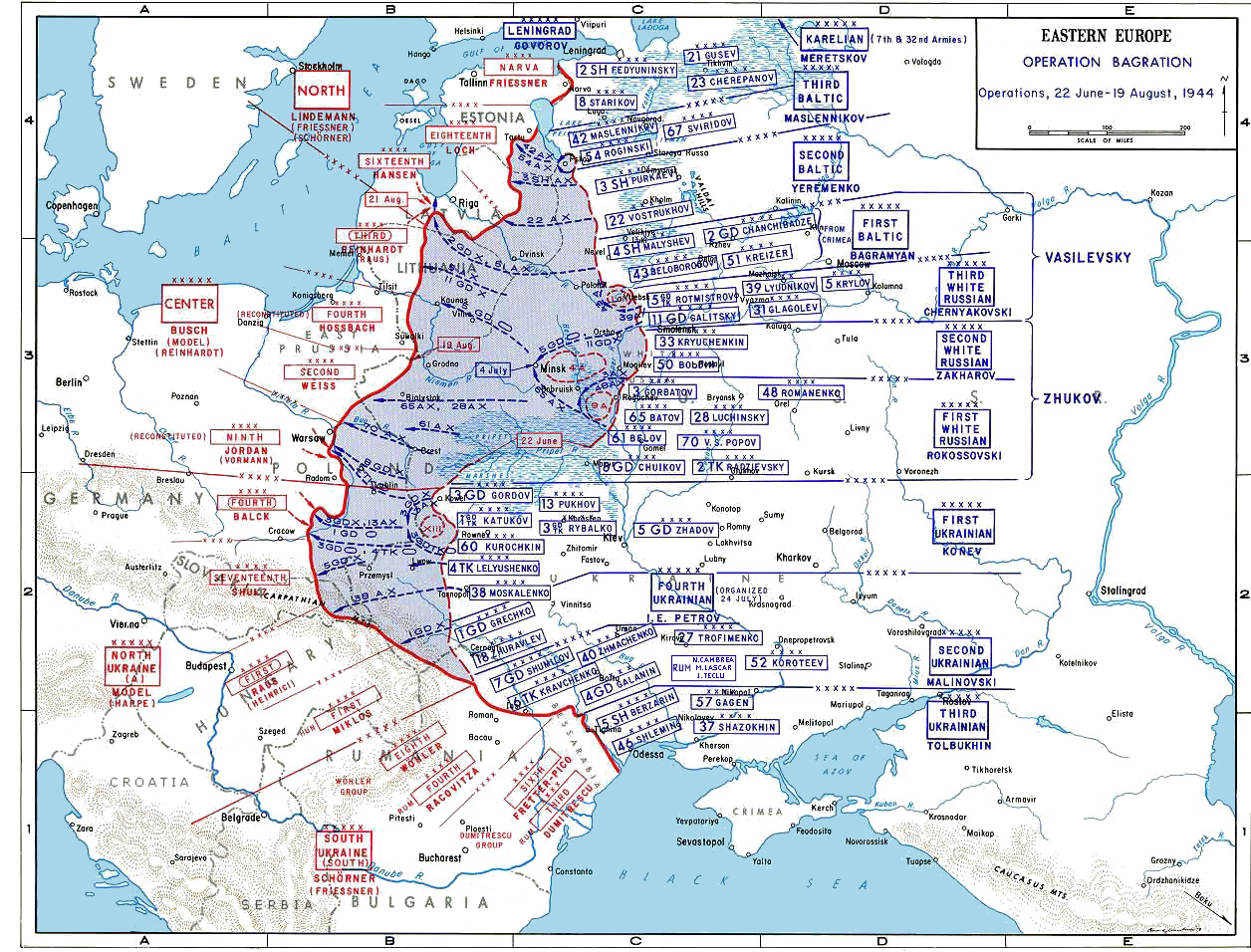
Operation Bagration

- The Soviets began Operation Bagration, a broad new summer offensive.
- President Roosevelt signed the G.I. Bill into law.
- The Battle of Tienhaara was fought on the Karelian Isthmus. The result was a Finnish defensive victory.
- The Battle of Kohima ended in decisive British victory. The siege of Imphal was raised when advance units of the 2nd British Division linked with the 5th Indian Division at Milestone 107 on the Imphal to Kohima road.
- The Defense of Hengyang began in the Second Sino-Japanese War.
- Japanese submarine I-185 was sunk near Saipan by American destroyers.
- The Appalachians tornado outbreak began in the Midwest and Middle Atlantic regions of the United States. Over 100 people were killed over the next two days, with Shinnston, West Virginia hit particularly hard as 66 fatalities were recorded in the town and surrounding area.
- Died: Josef Wurmheller, 27, German fighter ace (killed in an air collision during an aerial battle near Alençon, France)

== June 23, 1944 (Friday) ==
- The Soviets began the Bobruysk Offensive, Mogilev Offensive and Vitebsk–Orsha Offensive in the Byelorussian SSR.
- A Polish resistance group carried out the Dubingiai massacre of 20 to 27 Lithuanian civilians in retaliation for the Glinciszki massacre of June 20.
- The British cruiser Scylla struck a mine in the English Channel and was rendered a constructive total loss.
- Died: Eduard Dietl, 53, German general (plane crash); Sefanaia Sukanaivalu, 26, Fijian soldier and posthumous recipient of the Victoria Cross (killed in action on Bougainville Island attempting to rescue comrades)

== June 24, 1944 (Saturday) ==
- Hitler ordered all but one division of the German LIII Corps, encircled near Vitebsk, to break out.
- The British cargo ship Derrycunihy was sunk off Normandy with great loss of life by a Luftwaffe acoustic mine.
- On the Normandy front the Germans deployed a new weapon—the unmanned Mistel aircraft.
- Japanese submarine I-52 was depth charged and sunk southwest of the Azores by a Grumman TBF Avenger.
- German submarine U-1225 was depth charged and sunk west of Bergen by a PBY Canso of No. 162 Squadron RCAF.
- The Adelaide Mail in Australia published an article revealing that Ern Malley, supposedly a poet who had died as a complete unknown in 1943 but whose poems had recently been published in the avant-garde magazine Angry Penguins to great acclaim, never existed at all. Ern Malley's entire biography and body of work was a hoax created in a single afternoon by the writers James McAuley and Harold Stewart, calculated to embarrass Angry Penguins editor Max Harris by demonstrating how easy it was to write meaningless poetry in the modernist style and get intellectuals to praise it.
- Born: Jeff Beck, rock guitarist, in Wallington, London, England (d. 2023)

== June 25, 1944 (Sunday) ==
- The Battle of Osuchy began near Osuchy, Poland between Nazi German and Polish resistance forces.
- The Bombardment of Cherbourg took place when U.S. and British warships attacked German fortifications in and around Cherbourg.
- Operation Martlet began.
- The Battle of Tali-Ihantala began.
- German submarine U-269 was depth charged and sunk southeast of Torquay by British frigate Bickerton.
- Died: Lucha Reyes, 38, Mexican singer and actress

== June 26, 1944 (Monday) ==
- Allied troops captured Mogaung in Burma.
- German forces at Cherbourg surrendered. Fortress commander Karl-Wilhelm von Schlieben and Admiral Walter Hennecke were among the officers captured.
- British forces began Operation Epsom, again trying to take the German-occupied city of Caen.
- The Battle of Osuchy ended in German victory.
- The British frigate Goodson was torpedoed off Portland Bill by German submarine U-984 and rendered a total loss.
- German submarine U-317 was depth charged and sunk northeast of Shetland by a B-24 of No. 86 Squadron RAF.
- German submarine U-719 was depth charged and sunk northwest of Ireland by British destroyer Bulldog.
- All three New York baseball teams (the Yankees, the Giants and the Dodgers) squared off at the Polo Grounds in an experimental round-robin exhibition game to raise money for war bonds. Each team would play in the field and bat for two consecutive innings, then sit for an inning until they had played a total of nine innings. The final score was Dodgers 5, Yankees 1, Giants 0.
- The 1944 Republican National Convention opened in Chicago, Illinois.

== June 27, 1944 (Tuesday) ==
- Elements of the Sovet 1st Baltic Front occupied Vitebsk.
- During the Vyborg–Petrozavodsk Offensive, Red Army forces took Petrozavodsk itself.
- The Veterans' Preference Act was enacted in the United States, requiring the federal government to favor returning war veterans when hiring new employees.
- Died: Milan Hodža, 66, Prime Minister of Czechoslovakia from 1935 to 1938

== June 28, 1944 (Wednesday) ==
- The Bobruysk Offensive, Mogilev Offensive and Vitebsk–Orsha Offensive all ended in Soviet victories.
- Hitler sacked Ernst Busch as commander of Army Group Centre and replaced him with Walter Model.
- The Republican National Convention ended with the nomination of New York Governor Thomas E. Dewey in a quick first-ballot nomination. Ohio Governor John W. Bricker accepted the nomination for vice president. Dewey, who had not attended the convention, flew in that evening to give a speech accepting the nomination and vowing to "bring an end to one-man government in America."
- Died: Philippe Henriot, 55, French poet, journalist and Vichy official (assassinated by the French Resistance); Robert Martinek, 55, Bohemian artillery officer of the Austro-Hungarian Army and the Wehrmacht (killed in an air attack near Berezino)

== June 29, 1944 (Thursday) ==
- Born: Gary Busey, American actor; in Goose Creek, Texas

== June 30, 1944 (Friday) ==
- Operation Epsom ended.
- The last German forces on La Hague surrendered.
- The Battle of Vyborg Bay began.
- President Roosevelt signed a bill providing independence for the Philippines as soon as the Japanese were removed from the islands.
- Bush House, the headquarters of BBC World Service radio, was hit by a German flying bomb.
- German submarine U-478 was depth charged and sunk east of the Faroe Islands by Allied aircraft.
- Born: Terry Funk, professional wrestler, in Hammond, Indiana (d. 2023); Raymond Moody, philosopher, physician and author, in Porterdale, Georgia
