= Gerald L. Endl =

American soldier and posthumous recipient of the Medal of Honor

Gerald Leon Endl
- Born: August 20, 1915; Fort Atkinson, Wisconsin, US
- Died: July 11, 1944 (aged 28) near Anamo, Territory of New Guinea
- Military career
- Allegiance: United States
- Branch: United States Army
- Service years: 1941–1944
- Rank: Staff Sergeant
- Units: 128th Infantry Regiment, 32nd Infantry Division
- Conflicts: World War II
- Awards: Medal of Honor

Gerald Leon Endl (August 20, 1915 – July 11, 1944) was a United States Army soldier and a recipient of the United States military's highest decoration—the Medal of Honor—for his actions in World War II.

== Biography ==
Born and raised in Fort Atkinson, Wisconsin, Endl later married Anna Marie Goethe and moved to Janesville, from where he was inducted into the U.S. Army in April 1941. By July 11, 1944, he was serving in New Guinea as a staff sergeant in the 128th Infantry Regiment, 32nd Infantry Division. During a Japanese attack on that day, near Anamo, he single-handedly held off the advance until several wounded comrades could be rescued. He was killed while carrying the last wounded man to safety. For these actions, he was posthumously awarded the Medal of Honor eight months later, on March 13, 1945.

== Medal of Honor citation ==
Staff Sergeant Endl's official Medal of Honor citation reads:

For conspicuous gallantry and intrepidity at the risk of his life above and beyond the call of duty near Anamo, New Guinea, on 11 July 1944. S/Sgt. Endl was at the head of the leading platoon of his company advancing along a jungle trail when enemy troops were encountered and a fire fight developed. The enemy attacked in force under heavy rifle, machinegun, and grenade fire. His platoon leader wounded, S/Sgt. Endl immediately assumed command and deployed his platoon on a firing line at the fork in the trail toward which the enemy attack was directed. The dense jungle terrain greatly restricted vision and movement, and he endeavored to penetrate down the trail toward an open clearing of Kunai grass. As he advanced, he detected the enemy, supported by at least 6 light and 2 heavy machineguns, attempting an enveloping movement around both flanks. His commanding officer sent a second platoon to move up on the left flank of the position, but the enemy closed in rapidly, placing our force in imminent danger of being isolated and annihilated. Twelve members of his platoon were wounded, 7 being cut off by the enemy. Realizing that if his platoon were forced farther back, these 7 men would be hopelessly trapped and at the mercy of a vicious enemy, he resolved to advance at all cost, knowing it meant almost certain death, in an effort to rescue his comrades. In the face of extremely heavy fire he went forward alone and for a period of approximately 10 minutes engaged the enemy in a heroic close-range fight, holding them off while his men crawled forward under cover to evacuate the wounded and to withdraw. Courageously refusing to abandon 4 more wounded men who were lying along the trail, 1 by 1 he brought them back to safety. As he was carrying the last man in his arms he was struck by a heavy burst of automatic fire and was killed. By his persistent and daring self-sacrifice and on behalf of his comrades, S/Sgt. Endl made possible the successful evacuation of all but 1 man, and enabled the 2 platoons to withdraw with their wounded and to reorganize with the rest of the company.

== See also ==
- List of Medal of Honor recipients for World War II
