= German submarine U-361 =

German World War II submarine

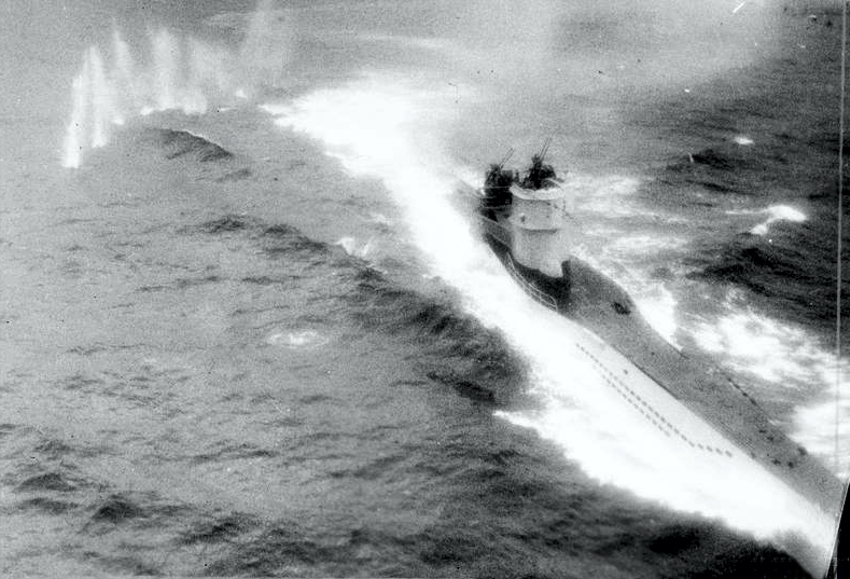
- U-361 shortly before her sinking

History

Nazi Germany
- Name: U-361
- Ordered: 7 December 1940
- Builder: Flensburger Schiffbau-Gesellschaft, Flensburg
- Yard number: 480
- Laid down: 12 September 1941
- Launched: 9 September 1942
- Commissioned: 18 December 1942
- Fate: Sunk on 17 July 1944

General characteristics
- Class & type: Type VIIC submarine
- Displacement: 769 tonnes (757 long tons) surfaced; 871 t (857 long tons) submerged
- Length: 67.10 m (220 ft 2 in) o/a; 50.50 m (165 ft 8 in) pressure hull
- Beam: 6.20 m (20 ft 4 in) o/a; 4.70 m (15 ft 5 in) pressure hull
- Height: 9.60 m (31 ft 6 in)
- Draught: 4.74 m (15 ft 7 in)
- Installed power: 2,800–3,200 PS (2,100–2,400 kW; 2,800–3,200 bhp) (diesels); 750 PS (550 kW; 740 shp) (electric)
- Propulsion: 2 shafts; 2 × diesel engines; 2 × electric motors
- Speed: 17.7 knots (32.8 km/h; 20.4 mph) surfaced; 7.6 knots (14.1 km/h; 8.7 mph) submerged
- Range: 8,500 nmi (15,700 km; 9,800 mi) at 10 knots (19 km/h; 12 mph) surfaced; 80 nmi (150 km; 92 mi) at 4 knots (7.4 km/h; 4.6 mph) submerged
- Test depth: 230 m (750 ft); Crush depth: 250–295 m (820–968 ft)
- Complement: 4 officers, 40–56 enlisted
- Armament: 5 × 53.3 cm (21 in) torpedo tubes (four bow, one stern); 14 × torpedoes or 26 TMA mines; 1 × 8.8 cm (3.46 in) deck gun (220 rounds); 2 × twin 2 cm (0.79 in) C/30 anti-aircraft guns

Service record
- Part of: 8th U-boat Flotilla; 18 December 1942 – 29 February 1944; 11th U-boat Flotilla; 1 March – 17 July 1944
- Identification codes: M 49 274
- Commanders: Kptlt. Hans Seidel; 18 December 1942 – 17 July 1944
- Operations: 3 patrols: 1st patrol: 22 February – 27 March 1944; 2nd patrol: 31 March – 24 April 1944; 3rd patrol: 27 June – 17 July 1944
- Victories: None

German submarine U-361 was a Type VIIC U-boat of Nazi Germany's Kriegsmarine during World War II.

She carried out three patrols. She did not sink or damage any ships.

She was a member of six wolfpacks.

She was sunk by a British aircraft west of Narvik on 17 July 1944.

== Design ==
German Type VIIC submarines were preceded by the shorter Type VIIB submarines. U-361 had a displacement of 769 tonnes (757 long tons) when at the surface and 871 tonnes (857 long tons) while submerged. She had a total length of 67.10 m (220 ft 2 in), a pressure hull length of 50.50 m (165 ft 8 in), a beam of 6.20 m (20 ft 4 in), a height of 9.60 m (31 ft 6 in), and a draught of 4.74 m (15 ft 7 in). The submarine was powered by two Germaniawerft F46 four-stroke, six-cylinder supercharged diesel engines producing a total of 2,800 to 3,200 metric horsepower (2,060 to 2,350 kW; 2,760 to 3,160 shp) for use while surfaced, two AEG GU 460/8–27 double-acting electric motors producing a total of 750 metric horsepower (550 kW; 740 shp) for use while submerged. She had two shafts and two 1.23 m (4 ft) propellers. The boat was capable of operating at depths of up to 230 metres (750 ft).

The submarine had a maximum surface speed of 17.7 knots (32.8 km/h; 20.4 mph) and a maximum submerged speed of 7.6 knots (14.1 km/h; 8.7 mph). When submerged, the boat could operate for 80 nautical miles (150 km; 92 mi) at 4 knots (7.4 km/h; 4.6 mph); when surfaced, she could travel 8,500 nautical miles (15,700 km; 9,800 mi) at 10 knots (19 km/h; 12 mph). U-361 was fitted with five 53.3 cm (21 in) torpedo tubes (four fitted at the bow and one at the stern), fourteen torpedoes, one 8.8 cm (3.46 in) SK C/35 naval gun, 220 rounds, and two twin 2 cm (0.79 in) C/30 anti-aircraft guns. The boat had a complement of between forty-four and sixty.

== Service history ==
The submarine was laid down on 12 September 1941 at the Flensburger Schiffbau-Gesellschaft yard at Flensburg as yard number 480, launched on 9 September 1942 and commissioned on 18 December under the command of Kapitänleutnant Hans Seidel.

She served with the 8th U-boat Flotilla from 18 December 1942 and the 11th flotilla from 1 March 1944.

=== First patrol ===
U-361's first patrol took her from Kiel in Germany to Narvik in Norway.

=== Second patrol ===
Her second foray was toward Bear Island in the Barents Sea, then into the Norwegian Sea.

=== Third patrol and loss ===
U-361 left Narvik for the last time on 27 June 1944. On 17 July, she was attacked by a British Catalina flying boat of No. 210 Squadron RAF. On the initial attack, the Catalina's depth charges failed to release, and U-361s crew were able to fire their anti-aircraft gun, hitting the aeroplane as it attacked again, killing the navigator and injuring four others. The first pilot, John Cruickshank, was hit in seventy-two places, with two serious wounds to his lungs and ten penetrating wounds to his lower limbs. In this second attack, Cruikshank's depth charges hit the U-361, sinking her. For his heroism in the attack, and in the five and a half hours until the Catalina returned to Sullum Voe, Cruickshank was awarded the Victoria Cross. There were no survivors of the U-boat's crew, all 52 men died.

=== Previously recorded fate ===
U-361 was originally noted as sunk on 17 July 1944 by a British B-24 Liberator of 86 Squadron. This attack sank U-347.

=== Wolfpacks ===
U-361 took part in six wolfpacks, namely:

- Boreas (29 February – 10 March 1944)
- Thor (10 – 26 March 1944)
- Blitz (2 – 5 April 1944)
- Keil (5 – 20 April 1944)
- Donner & Keil (20 – 23 April 1944)
- Trutz (28 June – 10 July 1944)

== Bibliography ==
- Busch, Rainer; Röll, Hans-Joachim (1999). German U-boat commanders of World War II : a biographical dictionary. Translated by Brooks, Geoffrey. London, Annapolis, Md: Greenhill Books, Naval Institute Press. ISBN 1-55750-186-6.
- Busch, Rainer; Röll, Hans-Joachim (1999). Deutsche U-Boot-Verluste von September 1939 bis Mai 1945 [German U-boat losses from September 1939 to May 1945]. Der U-Boot-Krieg (in German). Vol. IV. Hamburg, Berlin, Bonn: Mittler. ISBN 3-8132-0514-2.
- Gröner, Erich; Jung, Dieter; Maass, Martin (1991). U-boats and Mine Warfare Vessels. German Warships 1815–1945. Vol. 2. Translated by Thomas, Keith; Magowan, Rachel. London: Conway Maritime Press. ISBN 0-85177-593-4.
