= Anamo, New Guinea =

Anamo Paup
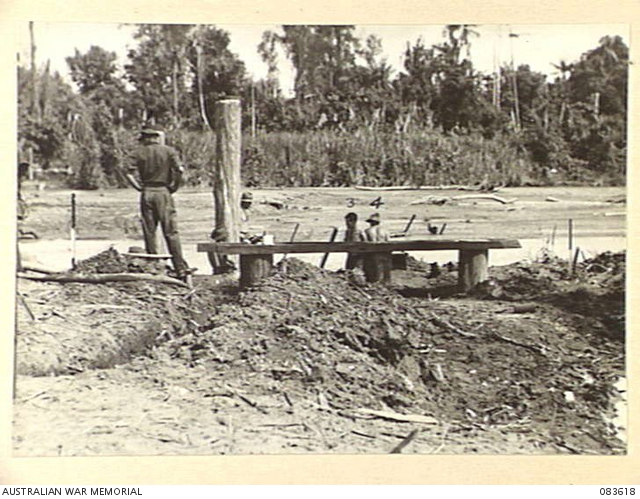
- The construction of the first bridge across the Driniumor River by the 2/8th Field Company at Anamo, 23 November 1944

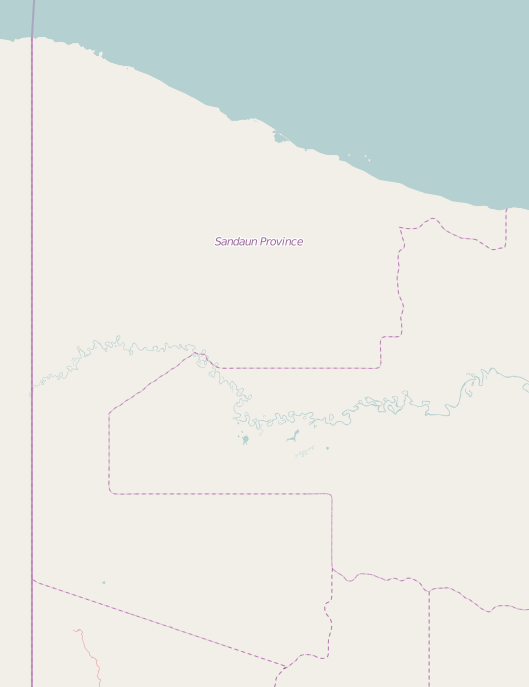
- Location within Sandaun Province
- Coordinates: 3°15′S 142°35′E
- Country: Papua New Guinea
- Province: Sandaun Province (West Sepik)
- Elevation: 6.1 m (20 ft)
- Time zone: UTC+10 (AEST)
- Location: 159 km (99 mi) ESE of Vanimo; 118 km (73 mi) WNW of Wewak
- Climate: Af

Anamo, also known as Paup, is a village on the north coast of Papua New Guinea in the Sandaun Province. It is a coastal settlement that is located to the east of Aitape, at the mouth of the Driniumor River. It is located in the East Aitape Rural LLG.

== History ==
The Battle of Driniumor River took place around Anamo in 1944. Gerald L. Endl was awarded the Medal of Honor for his actions near Anamo. During the battle, the Americans suffered almost 3,000 casualties including 440 killed while the Japanese lost 8,000–10,000 men.

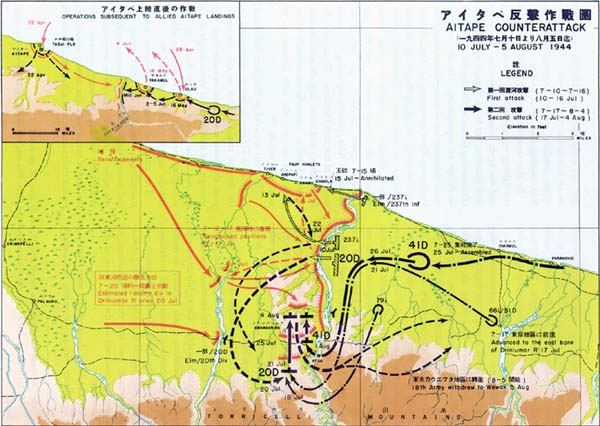
map of the action along the Driniumor River. Anamo is located near the mouth of the river.

== See also ==
- East Aitape Rural LLG
