= John Cruickshank =

Scottish Royal Air Force officer (1920–2025)

John Cruickshank VC AE
- Born: John Alexander Cruickshank; 20 May 1920; Aberdeen, Scotland
- Died: 9 August 2025 (aged 105)
- Military career
- Allegiance: United Kingdom
- Branch: British Army (1939–1941); Royal Air Force (1941–1946)
- Service years: 1939–1946
- Rank: Flight lieutenant
- Service number: 126700
- Units: No. 210 Squadron RAF
- Conflicts: Second World War
- Awards: Victoria Cross; Air Efficiency Award
- Other work: Banker

John Alexander Cruickshank, VC, AE (20 May 1920 – 9 August 2025) was a Scottish banker, Royal Air Force officer, and a Second World War recipient of the Victoria Cross (VC), the highest award for gallantry in the face of the enemy that can be awarded to British and Commonwealth forces. Cruickshank was awarded the VC for sinking a German U-boat and then, despite serious injuries, safely landing his aircraft. Before his death, he was the last living recipient to have been awarded the VC during the Second World War.

== Early life ==
Born on 20 May 1920 in Aberdeen, Scotland, Cruickshank was educated at the Royal High School, Edinburgh, Aberdeen Grammar School and Daniel Stewart's College. He was apprenticed to the Commercial Bank in Edinburgh.

== Military service ==
Within a year, on his father's suggestion, Cruickshank joined the Territorial Army, enlisting in the Royal Artillery in May 1939; he served there until the summer of 1941 when he transferred to the Royal Air Force Volunteer Reserve. He underwent flight training in Canada and the United States, earning his wings in July 1942. On 10 July, by then a sergeant, he received an emergency commission as a pilot officer in the RAFVR. He was promoted to flying officer (war-substantive) on 10 January 1943. After further training, he was assigned to No. 210 Squadron in March 1943, piloting Consolidated PBY Catalina flying boats, flying from RAF Sullom Voe in Shetland.

Sullom Voe, now known for its oil terminal, was a flying-boat base during the Second World War. It was used by 210 Squadron of RAF Coastal Command in its battle to keep the North Atlantic and Arctic sea lanes open for supply convoys. Flying Officer Cruickshank was twenty-four years old when he piloted a Consolidated Catalina anti-submarine flying boat from Sullom Voe on 17 July 1944 on a patrol north into the Norwegian Sea. The objective was to protect the British Home Fleet as it returned from the unsuccessful Operation Mascot raid on the German battleship Tirpitz. There, Cruickshank’s "Cat" caught a German Type VIIC U-boat on the surface.

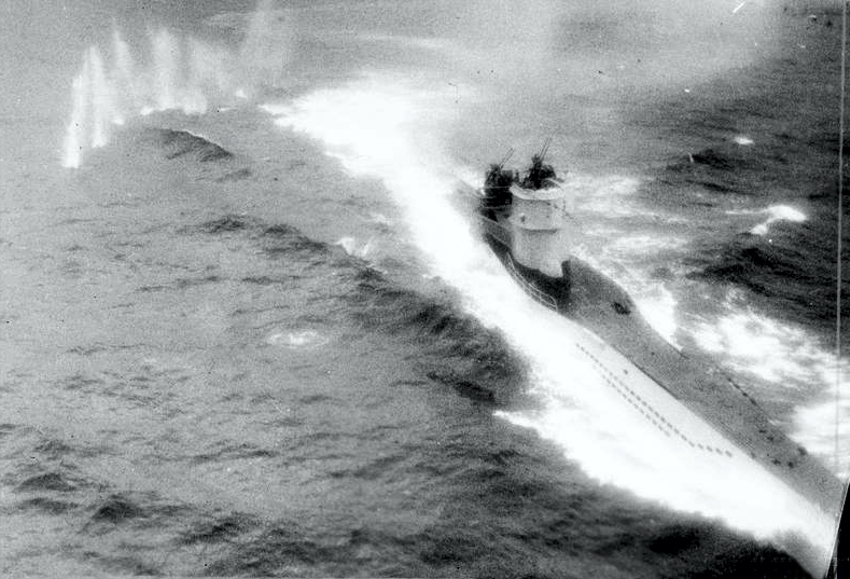
U-361 under attack

At this point in the war, U-boats had been fitted with anti-aircraft guns as an attempt to counter the aerial threat. Cruickshank nevertheless attacked the U-boat, flying his Catalina through a hail of flak. His first pass was unsuccessful, as his depth charges did not release. He brought the aircraft around for a second pass, this time successful as his charges straddled the U-boat, sinking it with the loss of all 52 crew members. The U-boat was first thought to be U-347, as Cruickshank's VC citation states, but later research suggested that it was actually U-361.

However, the German anti-aircraft fire had been deadly accurate, killing Cruickshank’s navigator and injuring four other members of the crew, including Cruickshank and the less seriously wounded second pilot, Flight Sergeant Jack Garnett. Cruickshank was hit in seventy-two places, with two serious wounds to his lungs and ten penetrating wounds to his lower limbs. Despite this, he refused medical attention until he was sure that the appropriate radio signals had been sent and the aircraft was on course for its home base. Even then, he refused morphine, aware that it would cloud his judgement. Flying through the night, it took the damaged Catalina five and a half hours to return to Sullom Voe, with Garnett at the controls and Cruickshank lapsing in and out of consciousness in the back. Cruickshank then returned to the cockpit and took command of the aircraft again. Deciding that the light and the sea conditions for a water landing were too risky for the inexperienced Garnett to put the aircraft down safely, he kept the flying boat in the air and circled for an extra hour until he considered it safer, when they landed the Catalina on the water and taxied to an area where it could be safely beached.

When the RAF medical officer boarded the aircraft, he discovered Cruickshank had lost a great deal of blood, and had to give him a transfusion before he was stable enough to be transferred to hospital. John Cruickshank's injuries were such that he never flew in command of an aircraft again. For his actions in sinking the U-boat and saving his crew he received the Victoria Cross, while Flight Sergeant Jack Garnett received the Distinguished Flying Medal. Later that month, Cruickshank was promoted to flight lieutenant (war-substantive), with effect from 10 July.

== Victoria Cross citation ==
The announcement and accompanying citation for the decoration was published in a supplement to The London Gazette, reading

Air Ministry, 1st September, 1944.

The King has been graciously pleased to confer the Victoria Cross on the undermentioned officer in recognition of most conspicuous bravery: —

Flying Officer John Alexander Cruickshank (126700), Royal Air Force Volunteer Reserve. No. 210 Squadron.

This officer was the captain and pilot of a Catalina flying boat which was recently engaged on an anti-submarine patrol over northern waters. When a U-boat was sighted on the surface, Flying Officer Cruickshank at once turned to the attack. In the face of fierce anti-aircraft fire he manoeuvred into position and ran in to release his depth charges. Unfortunately they failed to drop.

Flying Officer Cruickshank knew that the failure of this attack had deprived him of the advantage of surprise and that his aircraft offered a good target to the enemy's determined and now heartened gunners.

Without hesitation, he climbed and turned to come in again. The Catalina was met by intense and accurate fire and was repeatedly hit. The navigator/bomb aimer was killed. The second pilot and two other members of the crew were injured. Flying Officer Cruickshank was struck in seventy-two places, receiving two serious wounds in the lungs and ten penetrating wounds in the lower limbs. His aircraft was badly damaged and filled with the fumes of exploding shells. But he did not falter. He pressed home his attack, and released the depth charges himself, straddling the submarine perfectly. The U-boat was sunk.

He then collapsed and the second pilot took over the controls. He recovered shortly afterwards and, though bleeding profusely, insisted on resuming command and retaining it until he was satisfied that the damaged aircraft was under control, that a course had been set for base and that all the necessary signals had been sent. Only then would he consent to receive medical aid and have his wounds attended to. He refused morphia in case it might prevent him from carrying on.

During the next five and a half hours of the return flight he several times lapsed into unconsciousness owing to loss of blood. When he came to his first thought on each occasion was for the safety of his aircraft and crew. The damaged aircraft eventually reached base but it was clear that an immediate landing would be a hazardous task for the wounded and less experienced second pilot. Although able to breathe only with the greatest difficulty, Flying Officer Cruickshank insisted on being carried forward and propped up in the second pilot's seat. For a full hour, in spite of his agony and ever-increasing weakness, he gave orders as necessary, refusing to allow the aircraft to be brought down until the conditions of light and sea made this possible without undue risk.

With his assistance the aircraft was safely landed on the water. He then directed the taxying and beaching of the aircraft so that it could easily be salvaged. When the medical officer went on board, Flying Officer Cruickshank collapsed and he had to be given a blood transfusion before he could be removed to hospital.

By pressing home the second attack in his gravely wounded condition and continuing his exertions on the return journey with his strength failing all the time, he seriously prejudiced his chance of survival even if the aircraft safely reached its base. Throughout, he set an example of determination, fortitude and devotion to duty in keeping with the highest traditions of the Service.

== Later life and death ==
Cruickshank left the RAF in September 1946 to return to his career in banking; he retired from this in 1977. In March 2004, Queen Elizabeth II unveiled the first national monument to Coastal Command at Westminster Abbey, London. Cruickshank said in an interview after the ceremony: "When they told me that I was to get the VC it was unbelievable. Decorations didn't enter my head." Four VCs were awarded to Coastal Command in the war; the others were posthumous.

Cruickshank was vice chairman of The Victoria Cross and George Cross Association. He celebrated his 100th birthday on 20 May 2020, becoming the first recipient of the Victoria Cross to reach the age of 100 and the second member of the VC and GC Association after Stuart Archer, a George Cross recipient.

In March 2024, Cruickshank was presented with the Air Efficiency Award on a private visit by Group Captain (retd) Kemp of the Royal Auxiliary Air Force. Through research, it was proven that Cruickshank should have been granted the medal over 77 years prior. Cruickshank died on 9 August 2025, aged 105.

== Awards ==
(ribbon bar, as it would look today)

- Victoria Cross
- 1939–1945 Star
- Atlantic Star
- Arctic Star
- Defence Medal
- War Medal 1939–1945
- Queen Elizabeth II Coronation Medal (1953)
- Queen Elizabeth II Silver Jubilee Medal (1977)
- Queen Elizabeth II Golden Jubilee Medal (2002)
- Queen Elizabeth II Diamond Jubilee Medal (2012)
- Queen Elizabeth II Platinum Jubilee Medal (2022)
- King Charles III Coronation Medal (2023)
- Efficiency Medal (1949)
- Air Efficiency Award, which was awarded 75 years late, in 2024

Since the King George VI Coronation Medal in 1937, living Victoria Cross and George Cross recipients are automatically eligible for any coronation and jubilee medals that are given following their being awarded the Victoria Cross or the George Cross.
