= Święciany massacre =

1942 mass murders of Poles in occupied Lithuania

- Part of World War II
- Location: 55°08′N 26°10′E; Święciany and surrounding villages
- Date: 19–21 May 1942
- Attack type: War crime, massacre
- Deaths: 400 to 1,200
- Victim: Poles
- Perpetrator: Lithuanian Security Police
- Assailants: Jonas Maciulevičius and co-conspirators

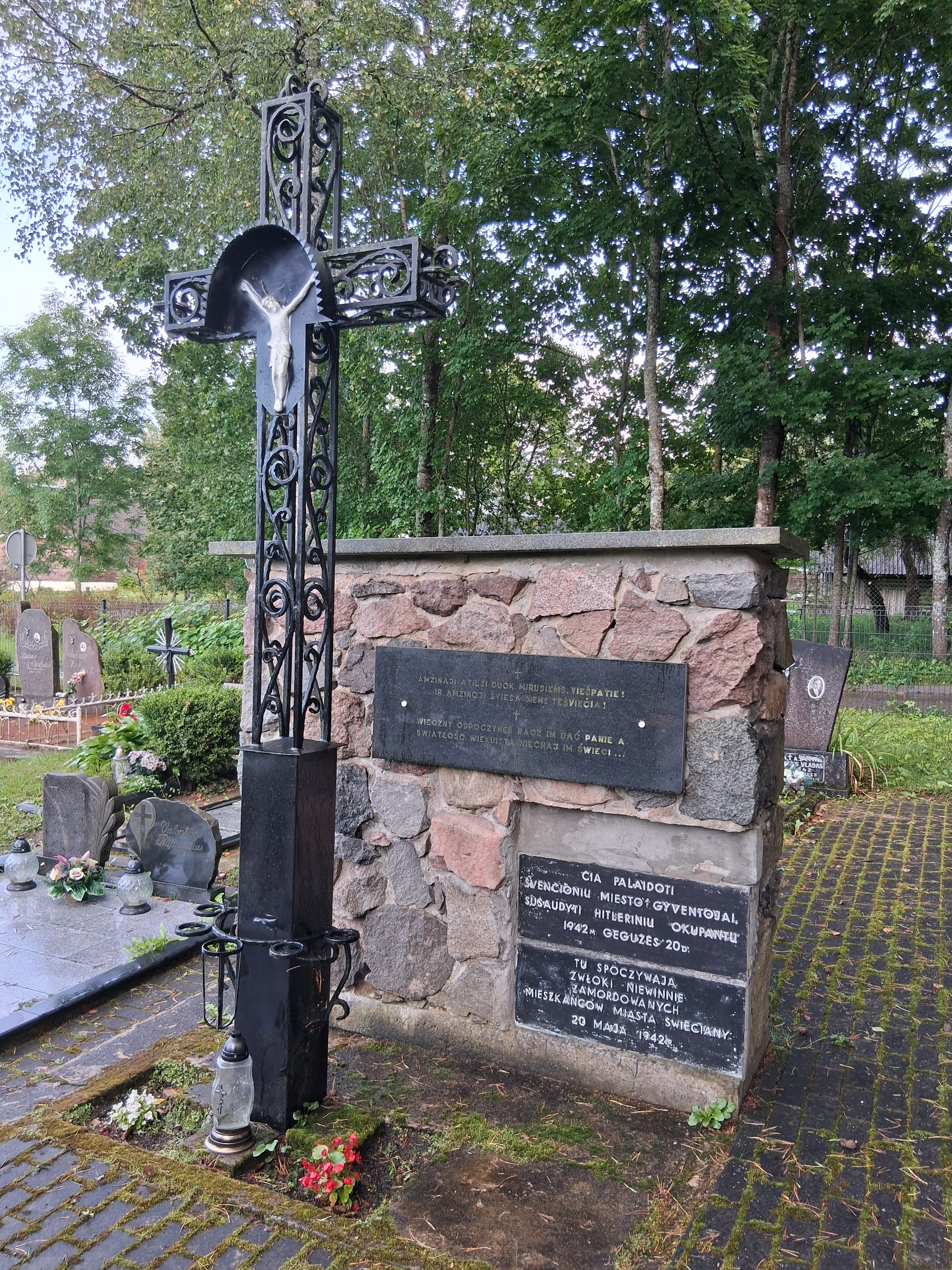
Monument commemorating the victims at the cemetery in Švenčionys

The Święciany or Švenčionys massacre (Polish: Zbrodnia w Święcianach) was a series of mass murders committed against Poles in Święciany (now Švenčionys, Lithuania) and its surroundings on 19–21 May 1942 by Lithuanian collaborators, mainly the Lithuanian Security Police (known by its Lithuanian name Saugumas), on the German orders. As a result between 400 and 1,200 people were killed.

== Massacre ==
The massacre was a reprisal action for the assassination of German officials carried out by Soviet partisans under the command of Colonel Fedor Markov on the road between Święciany and Łyntupy, on 19 May 1942. Killed were Oberleutnant Joseph Beck, who was a land administrator in the district of Święciany, his deputy Walter Gruhl, and commandant of the POW camp Schneider. Partisans spared Elżbieta Rakowska, who worked for Germans as an interpreter and was also a member of the Home Army. They did that most likely because of her acquaintance with Markov, whom she had known from before the war, and who had established contacts with the Polish underground. The Germans arrested Rakowska, accused her of complicity in the assassination and sent her to a concentration camp.

On the same day, the head of the Vilnius military commander Col. Adolf Zehnpfennig ordered the execution of 400 Poles from Święciany and villages within a 50 kilometres (31 mi) radius of the assassination site. The operation began the following day, was commanded by Jonas Maciulevičius, and involved Lithuanian policemen, the German SiPo, and members of the Lithuanian killing squad Ypatingasis būrys.

== Victims ==
Although the German order said 400 were executed, certainly many more were killed, with various sources claiming 450, 600 and even 1,200 victims. According to studies carried out after 2000, the number of victims is around 450 people. The proscription lists were prepared by the Lithuanian administration and included representatives of the Polish intelligentsia, only some of the victims are known by name. Two of the victims were two Catholic priests – the parish priest Bolesław Bazewicz (Boleslovas Bazevičius) and school chaplain Jan Naumowicz (Jonas Naumovičius).

In Stare Święciany, between 30 and 57 people were shot in the Jewish cemetery. At least 26 people were killed in Święciany. Further executions were carried out by the road connecting Święciany and Łyntupy, and 150 in Łyntupy. In Hoduciszki, between 30 and 40 men were shot. In the villages of Wygoda and Kaptaruny almost all the men were shot. 40 people were killed in Sobolki, 50 in Szudowce, 20 in Kaznodzieiszki. People from the following locations were also executed: Komaje, Widze, Kiemieliszki, Giluty, Stukowszczyzna, Wieliczki, Popieliki, Zaki, Janamiszki, Romaniszki, Ażurajscie, and Twerecz.

Most of the executions took place on 20 May, but individual shootings continued for several more days. At the same time, on 24 May, a similar massacre occurred in Olkienniki, where the Lithuanian police murdered 21 Poles.

== Aftermath ==
The massacre was publicized in the press to dissuade local residents from helping the Soviet partisans. The announcement from the German Information Office was published in the press on 25 May 1942: "In the eastern territory of the General District of Lithuania, cowardly assassins murdered Germans from the Reich, Josef Beck and Walter Gruhl, who were on a business trip. As retaliation for this disgraceful act, 400 saboteurs and communists, mostly Poles, were executed."

The events in Święciany shook the Polish underground, already weakened by arrests carried out by the Gestapo and Saugumas between November and December 1941. Immediately after the events, the Home Army (AK) prepared a report denying the German press statements: "The official communiqué published in the press states 400 people [were killed], which is untrue. The Germans have allegedly halted the executions, yet the Lithuanians continue their terror, shooting individuals one by one." The Command of the Vilnius District of the AK and the associated Voivodeship Council, which brought together representatives of political parties, demanded retaliation against "ethnically Lithuanian settlements." However, this radical proposal was rejected by the Chief of the AK, General Stefan Rowecki. The Polish government in London also responded to the massacre. The Council of Ministers decided to suspend financial aid for Lithuanians living abroad and to break off talks with the Lithuanian political émigré community until they condemned the crimes committed by their compatriots against Poles in the Vilnius region.

In July 1942, Kazys Grinius and Mykolas Krupavičius delivered a protest note to Petras Kubiliūnas, the general counselor of the Generalbezirk Litauen, protesting the use of collective punishment. In more practical terms, Lithuanian officials raised the issue of protecting the locals and forming local self-defence units. Such units were allowed when partisan activity intensified in fall 1943.

The scale of the massacre had a profoundly negative impact on the sentiments of the Polish population, particularly those living along the pre-war border between Poland and Lithuania. Among Poles, fear spread that the threats appearing in the press and Lithuanian reports—suggesting that after the genocide of the Jews, it would be the Poles' turn—were now being realized. Especially since, at the same time, a mass deportation campaign for forced labor in the Reich was underway, having begun on 16 May 1942. Due to the actions of the Lithuanian-dominated administration, it primarily affected Poles, who made up 22,000 of the 30,000 people deported from the Vilnius region to Germany.

This fear had a direct impact on the results of the population census conducted by the German authorities a week after the massacre, on 27 May 1942. In border municipalities (e.g., Joniškis or Giedraičiai), where pre-war censuses had shown a significant majority of the Polish population, the percentage of people declaring Polish nationality suddenly dropped to just a few percent. In other areas (e.g., Paberžė or Nemenčinė), it also decreased significantly.

== Prosecutions ==
Maciulevičius was sentenced to death by the Court of Appeals in Olsztyn on 2 May 1950. He was executed on 12 December 1950 in Olsztyn prison.

In 1945, five Lithuanian police officers involved in the operation (Jonas Kurpis, Edvardas Verikas, Bronius Čečiura, Jonas Ankėnas, and Jonas Garla) stood trial before the Military Tribunal of the NKVD of the Lithuanian Soviet Socialist Republic. Garla was released while others were sentenced to 10–20 years in prison.

One of the Lithuanian Security Police officers Antanas Granickas was sentenced to death by the Military Tribunal of the 43rd Soviet Army, which was carried out on 21 February 1946. Granickas was also convicted of the Ponary murders, and convicted for the personal responsibility of killing of about 5,000 people.

In early 2000s, the Polish Institute of National Remembrance reinvestigated the crime and concluded that no other living perpetrators of this crime remained identified and alive. The investigation was closed in 2005.

== See also ==
- Švenčionys Ghetto

== Bibliography ==
- Karbowiak, Arkadiusz (2007). "Konflikt polsko-litewski na Wileńszczyźnie w latach 1941–1944" [Polish-Lithuanian conflict in the Vilnius region in 1941-1944]. Glaukopis. 9/10: 231–257.
- Rokicki, Paweł (2015). Glinciszki i Dubinki. Zbrodnie wojenne na Wileńszczyźnie w połowie 1944 roku i ich konsekwencje we współczesnych relacjach polsko-litewskich [Glinciszki and Dubinki. War crimes in the Vilnius Region in mid-1944 and their consequences in contemporary Polish-Lithuanian relations] (PDF). Monografie (in Polish). Warsaw: Institute of National Remembrance. ISBN 978-83-8229-224-4.
- Wardzyńska, Maria (1993). Sytuacja ludności polskiej w Generalnym Komisariacie Litwy. Czerwiec 1941 – lipiec 1944 [Situation of the Polish population in the General Commissariat of Lithuania: June 1941 – July 1944] (in Polish). Warsaw: Agencja Wydawnicza Mako. ISBN 8390057395.
