= Švenčionėliai massacre =

Mass murder of Jews in Švenčionėliai, Lithuania during the Holocaust

Coordinates: 55.166900°N 25.980967°E

The Švenčionėliai massacre was the mass murder of Jews during the Holocaust on October 8-10 1941, at the former Soviet military training ground in Žeimena forest, about 1.5km away from Švenčionėliai in Lithuania, then known as the Generalbezirk Litauen in the Reichskommissariat Ostland.

The victims were from Švenčionys (estimated 2,000), Švenčionėliai, as well as from all places of the region: Ignalina (about 400–700 Jews), New Daugėliškis (about 40–50 Jews), Kaltanėnai (about 80 Jews), Linkmenys, Pabradė, Adutiškis and Stajėtiškis (about 200 Jews), Saldutiškis and Labanoras (about 50–60 Jews), Mielagėnai (12 families), Salamianka village (2 families, about 30–40 Jews), Ceikiniai and others - the whole Jewish population of the region. According to German records, 3,726 Jews were murdered on October 9. The total estimated number of the murdered Jews was between 7,000 and 8,000. The murder was perpetrated by Nazi Germany authorities, officers of the Švenčionys county police and the local Hilfspolizei

In 1961 a monument to the victims was erected at the site, reconstructed in 1993. The site is protected by the state as a cultural monument of historical and memorial value.

== See also ==
- Švenčionys Ghetto
