= Lithuanian St. Casimir Youth Society =

The Lithuanian St. Casimir Youth Society (Lithuanian: Lietuvių šv. Kazimiero draugija jaunimui auklėti ir globoti, lit. 'Society of Saint Casimir for the Education and Care of Young People', Polish: Litewskie Towarzystwo Wychowawcze i Opieki nad Młodzieżą im. Św. Kazimierza) was a society of the Lithuanians living in Vilnius Region which was controlled by the Second Polish Republic but claimed by the interwar Lithuania. Established in 1925 to promote the Lithuanian national identity and Catholicism, the society organized chapters and reading rooms in various towns and villages and organized various cultural events, mostly amateur theater performances. It had chapters in 482 locations in total and about 20,000 members in 1935.

It cooperated with the Lithuanian Education Society Rytas which maintained Lithuanian schools in the region. Activities of the Society of Saint Casimir were increasingly restricted by the Polish authorities. Most of its chapters were closed in 1936 and the society itself was closed in December 1937. It was briefly reestablished in 1939–1940.

== History ==
=== Establishment ===
Vilnius Region was captured by Poland after the Żeligowski's Mutiny in October 1920 and officially incorporated into the Second Polish Republic in April 1922. Lithuania claimed the region and declared Vilnius (Wilno, Vilna) as its capital leading to a prolonged dispute.

In early 1922, Lithuanian priest Nikodemas Raštutis proposed to establish a society for the education of the youth. He proposed to name the society after Saint Casimir, the patron saint of Lithuania. The society likely received advice and support from the Society of Saint Casimir which operated in Kaunas since 1905. Other priests, including Petras Kraujalis, Jonas Skruodys, and Vincas (Bonaventūra) Zajančkauskas, supported the idea but the Polish authorities refused to register the society. Revised documents with new names for the founders were submitted in late 1922, but they were rejected again. After complaints and appeals to the Polish Ministry of Interior, the society was finally registered on 5 October 1925. The Lithuanian society was established as a counter to the Association of Polish Youth (Stowarzyszenia Młodzieży Polskiej) established by bishop Romuald Jałbrzykowski.

The founding meeting took place on 22 November 1925 in Vilnius. The meeting elected the first board, which was chaired by priest Antanas Viskantas. Other members included Ignas Budzeika (treasurer), Konstantinas Aleksa (secretary), Domicelė Palevičienė, and Nikodemas Raštutis. However, its charter had to be corrected. The new charter was approved by the Polish authorities on 10 February 1927. Therefore, from 1925 to 1926, the society was not very active.

The society received financial support from the Lithuanian government via the Provisional Committee of Vilnius Lithuanians. In 1932–1935, it received 99,420 Polish złoty. It also was funded by membership fees (one złoty per quarter), donations, and proceeds from ticket sales to cultural events. In July 1932, Viskantas was replaced by Vincentas Taškūnas as the chairman of the board. Taškūnas was the editor of Vilniaus aušra thus the newspaper reported frequently on the activities of the society. The society did not have its own publication, but other Lithuanian periodicals, including Vilniaus rytojus, Jaunimo draugas, Vilniaus šviesa, also reported on the society.

=== Liquidation ===
As Lithuania–Poland relations grew tenser, the Polish authorities began closing local chapters of the Society of Saint Casimir in 1934. The closures particularly intensified in 1936: in less than six months, 134 chapters were closed. By September 1936, about 250 chapters were closed. The society was prohibited to operate in Suwałki and Grodno counties of the Białystok Voivodeship on 26 November 1936 and in the Wilno Voivodeship on 3 December 1936. Officially, the society had about 20 chapters remaining in the Lida County of the Nowogródek Voivodeship. On 25 November 1937, Polish police searched the office of the Society of Saint Casimir as well as the residences of its chairman and two board members. The society was officially closed on 31 December 1937. Society's property and records were seized by the Polish authorities. It was part of a wider anti-Lithuanian campaign: in 1936–1938, nine Lithuanian organizations in Poland were closed.

After the invasion of Poland in September 1939, Vilnius Region was occupied by the Soviet Union and then partially transferred to Lithuania in October according to the Soviet–Lithuanian Mutual Assistance Treaty. The Society of Saint Casimir was allowed to operate again on 28 October 1939. It managed to open five local chapters and 16 kindergartens before the Soviet occupation in June 1940. The society was abolished by the new Soviet regime.

== Activities ==
=== Local chapters ===
Local chapters and membership by year
Year	Chapters	Members
1925	1	
1926	10	126
1927	114	1,136
1928	150	3,810
1929	202	7,246
1930	311	13,297
1931	358	14,000
1932	386	15,000
1934	405	16,044
1935	477	19,945

The society was very active in organizing local chapters in towns and villages. For a chapter, at least ten members were needed. Most chapters were initiated by local priests or by teachers of Lithuanian schools maintained by the Lithuanian Education Society Rytas. Therefore, in majority of cases, the town or village had both societies active at the same time. The society sent instructions to educate locals about the society and assist with organizational matters, including the registration with the Polish authorities. Sometimes, the instructors would also teach Lithuanian folk songs or Lithuanian games and provide other educational material. During holidays, chapters were visited by students who delivered lectures and speeches. However, for the most part, the local chapters operated independently from the headquarters in Vilnius.

Most of the chapters established and maintained small libraries or reading rooms of Lithuanian publications and literature. The books could be lent only to members of the society. When a branch in Adutiškis lent several books to non-members, local officials sued responsible society members including its chairman Vincentas Taškūnas. At various times, the society operated 26 kindergartens (9 before 1937, 16 in 1939–1940, and one unknown year), 39 public reading rooms, and one primary school in Wojciuliszki. The school opened in fall 1927 and had 116 students during the 1932/33 school year. It was replaced by a Polish public school in fall 1933. Local chapters also organized sections for young farmers (36 locations), sports (52 locations), theater performers, or singers.

The chapters organized various local events. In particular, they marked the feast day of Saint Casimir (4 March), Lithuania's Independence Day (16 February), and Mother's Day. Chapters often organized local musical evening or staged amateur theater plays (so-called barn theatres). Polish authorities actively monitored society's events. Even routine meetings of local members needed to be pre-approved by the local authorities. For violating these rules, the chapters faced fines (usually of 200 Polish złoty) or, less frequently, arrests of its activists (up to 14 days).

In 1930, the chapters commemorated the 500th death anniversary of Grand Duke Vytautas by erecting monuments or crosses. More crosses were built during the Catholic Jubilee in 1933 (in commemoration of the 1900th anniversary of the traditional year of Jesus's death and resurrection).

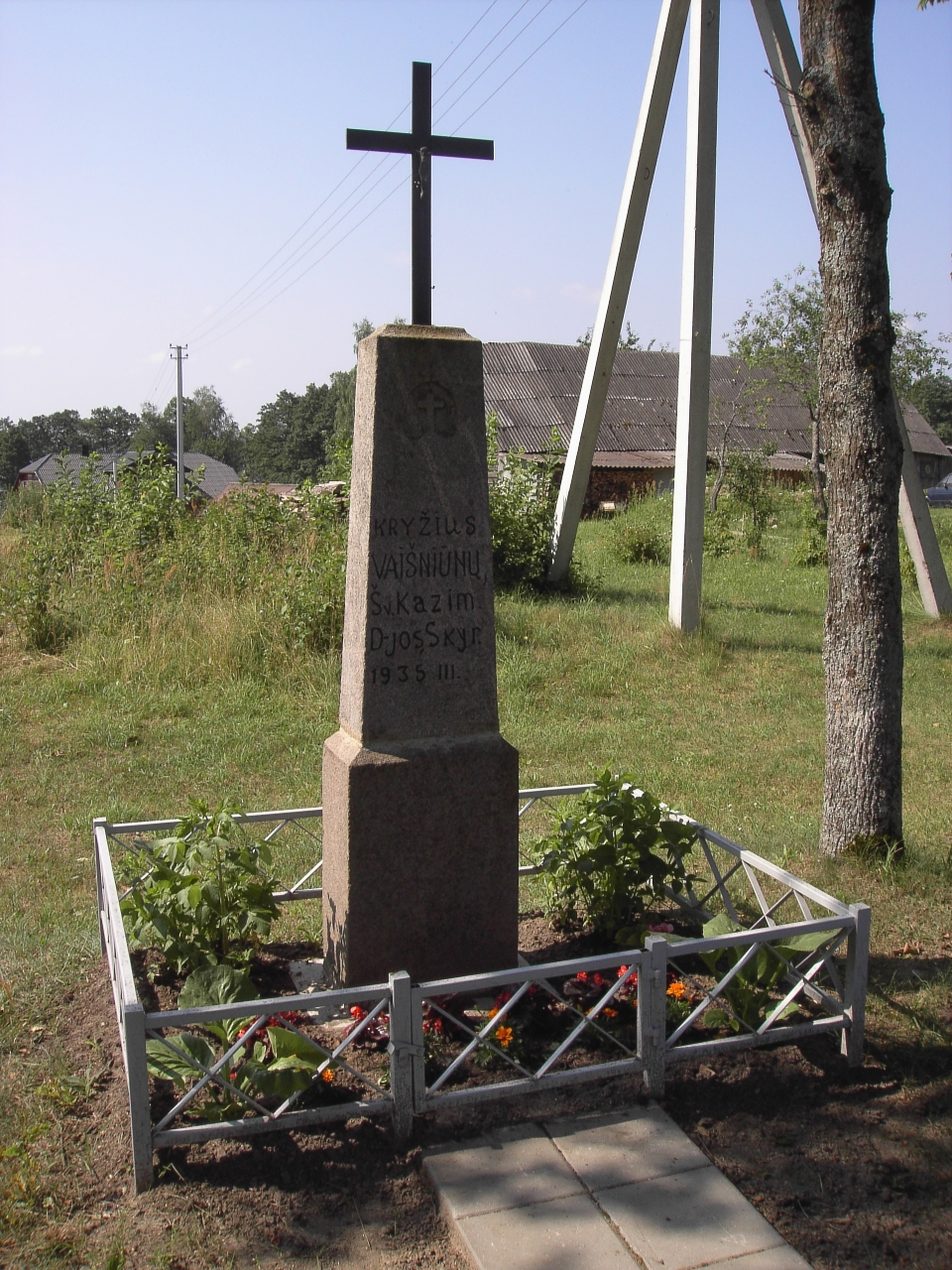
Cross built by the society in Vaišniūnai in 1935

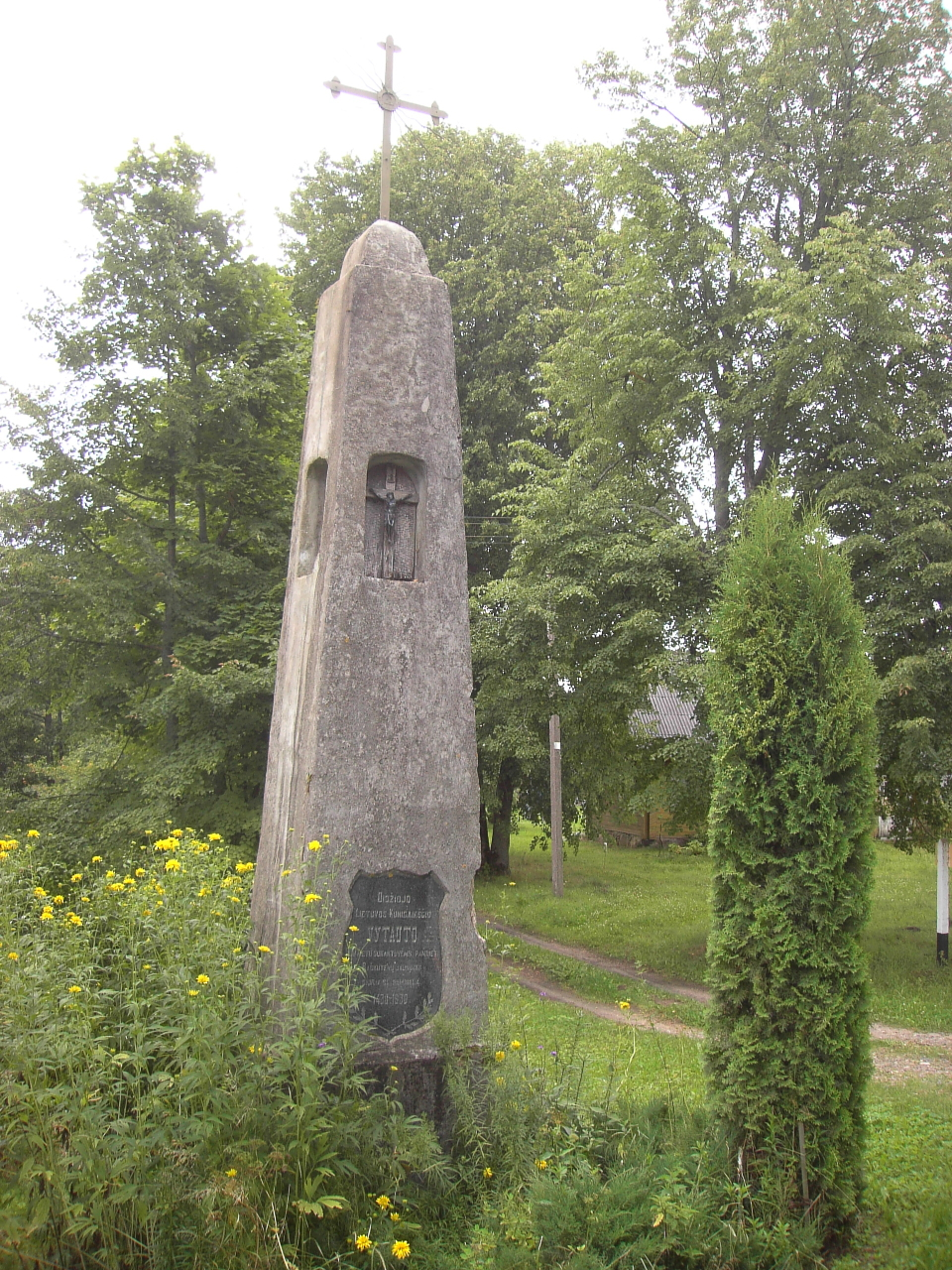
Monument to Grand Duke Vytautas built in Reškutėnai

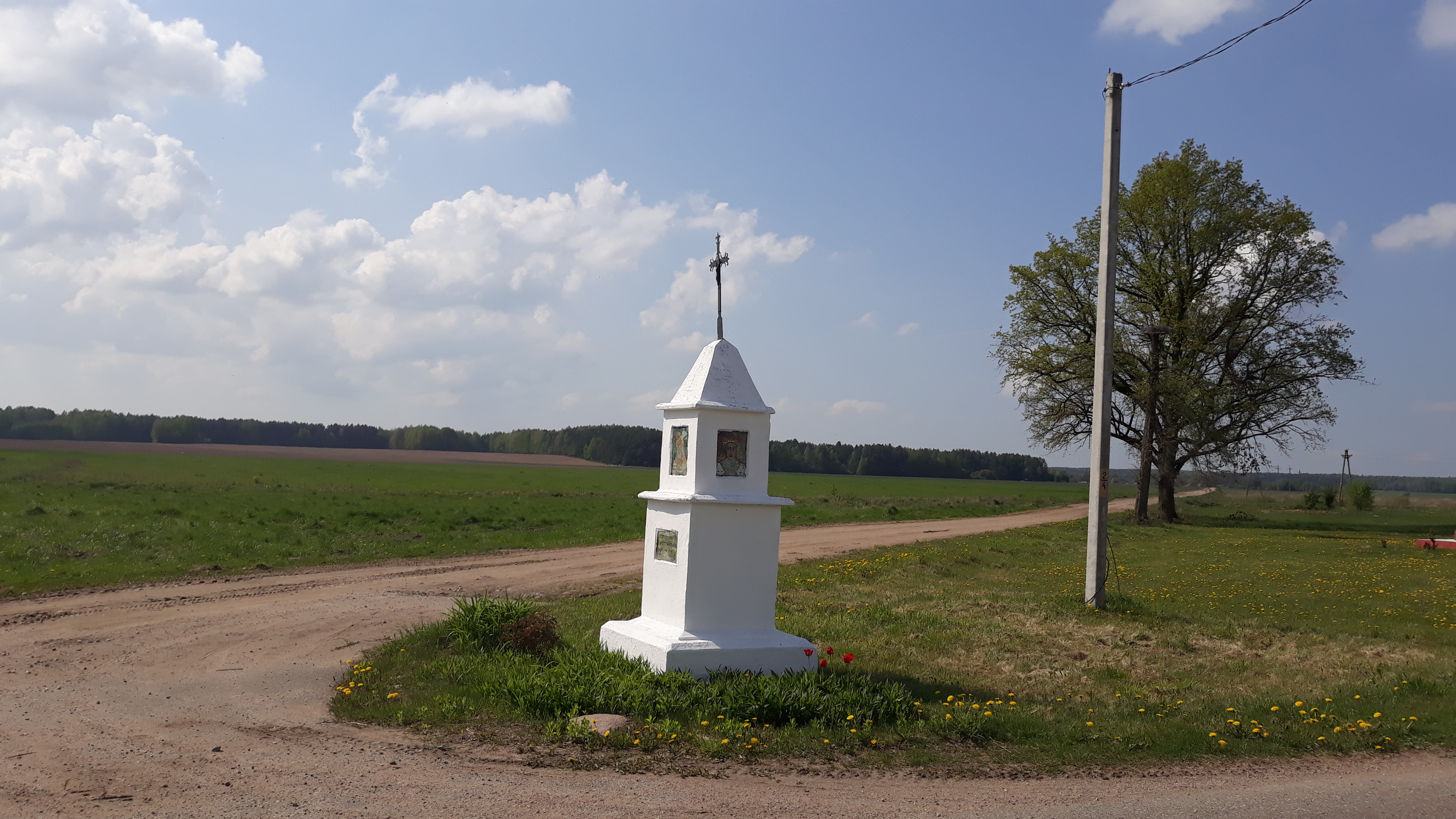
Monument to Grand Duke Vytautas built in Hiry

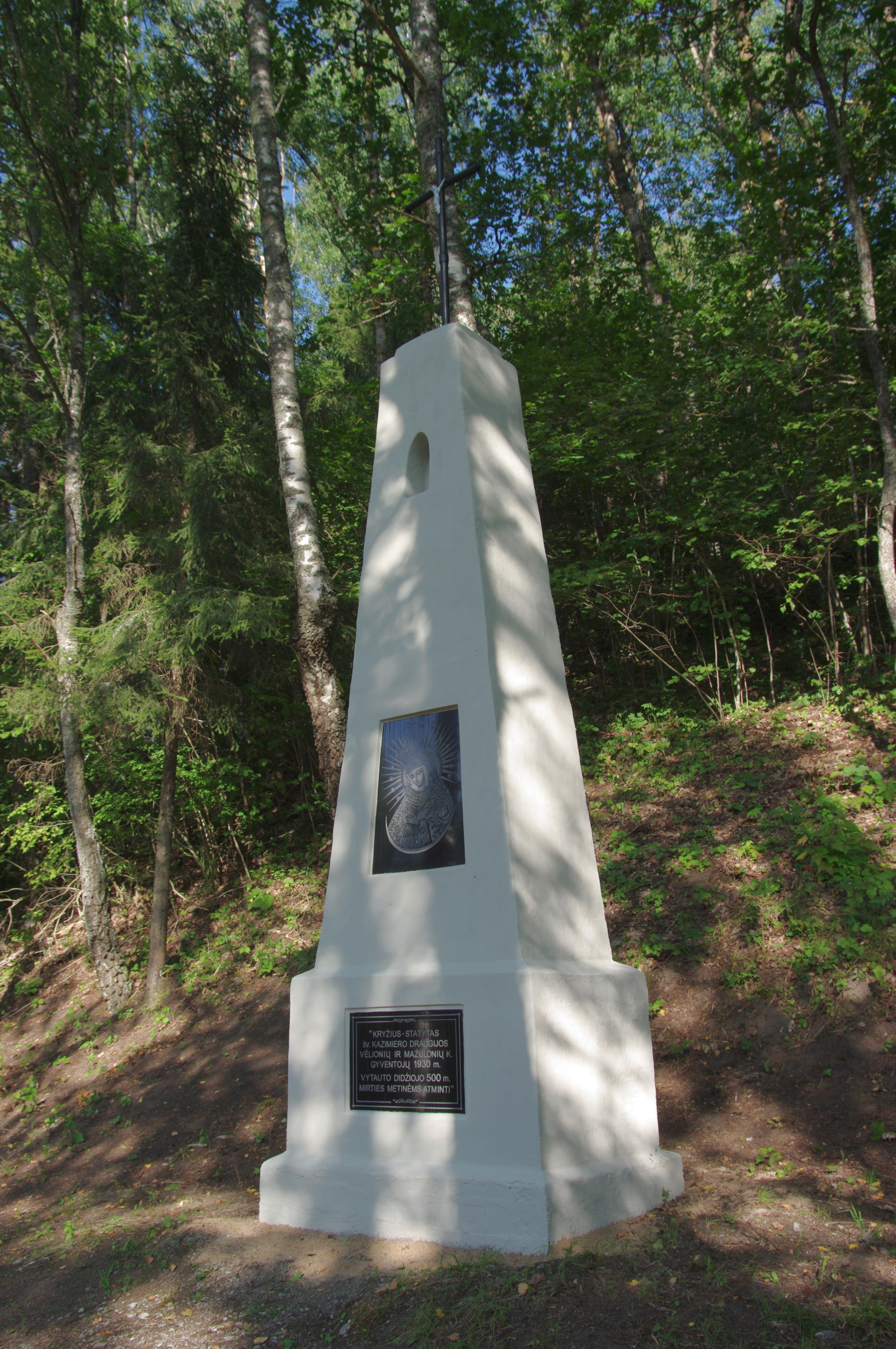
Cross with Our Lady of the Gate of Dawn built in Mažulonys

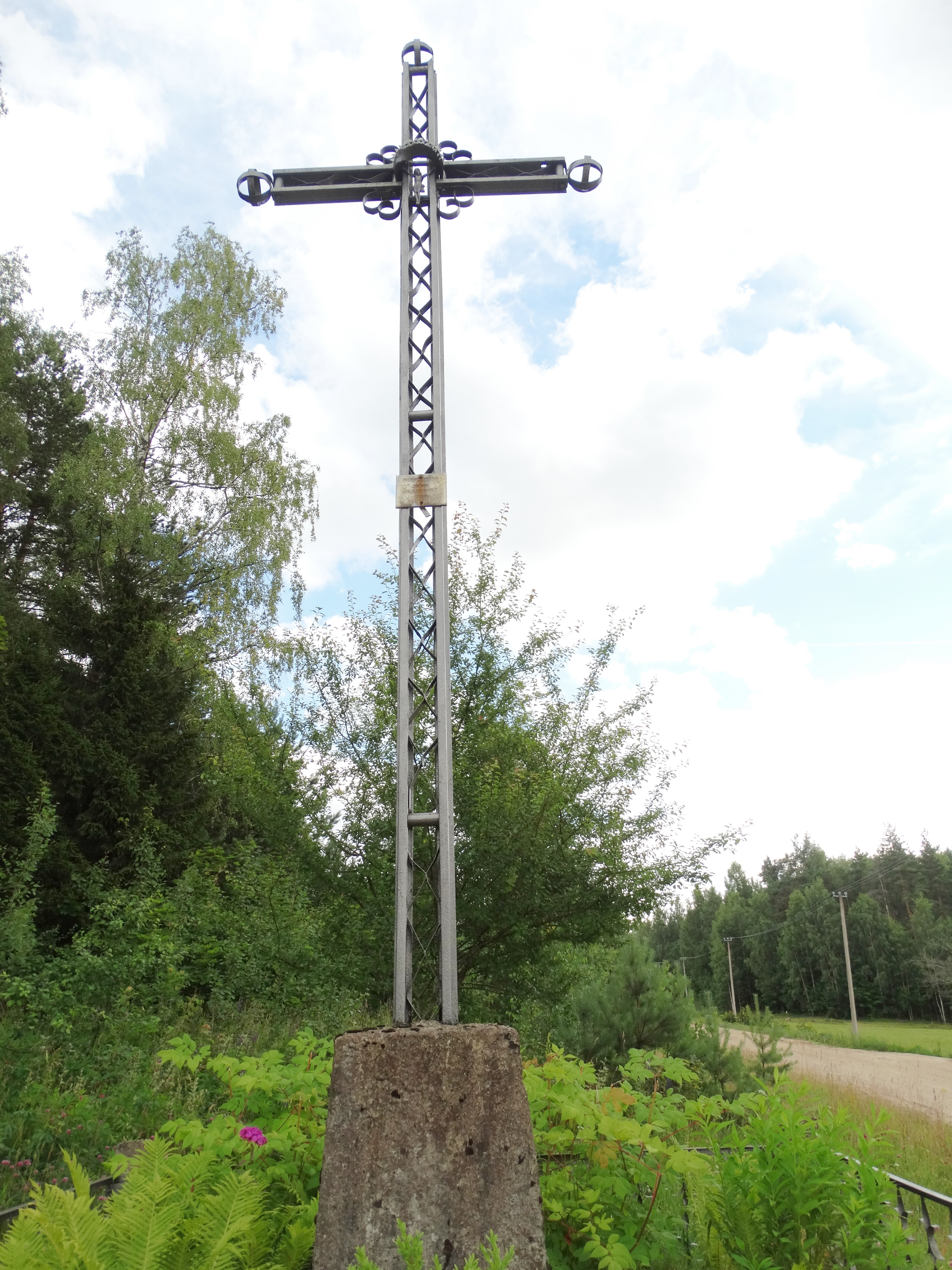
Cross made of railway tracks built in Ažušilė

Such activities sometimes provoked local conflicts. For example, Lithuanians erected a cross in front of the church in Marcinkonys in December 1933. The next day, it was removed by Polish policemen. Locals attempted to defend the cross and five people received prison sentences. News about the incident spread widely in Lithuania causing an uproar; the Union for the Liberation of Vilnius published a 48-page booklet Išniekinti kryžiai (Desecrated Crosses) about this and other incidents, including about Gubertas Rukšėnas, chairman of a local chapter in Vaišniūnai, who was killed by a Polish border guard on 16 February 1934.

=== Activities in Vilnius ===
The first conference of society's members was organized in Vilnius on 5–6 June 1933. Attended by about 100 people, it was essentially a training course on how to organize and run a society. Lectures were given on the goals of the Society of Saint Casimir, activities and recordkeeping of local chapters, freedom of association, cooperation, sport, and collection of Lithuanian folklore. This conference was followed by 2–3-day regional gatherings in Švenčionys, Pieliasa, Opsa.

On 10 June 1935, to commemorate ten years since its establishment, the society opened an exhibition of folk art. The exhibits were collected from Vilnius and Suwałki Regions. Some 3,000 items (fabrics, knitwear, wood carvings, clay items) were displayed at the Lithuanian Vytautas Magnus Gymnasium. The exhibition continued for 15 days.

== Bibliography ==
- Čaplikas, Juozas (26 January 2008). "Vilniaus kultûrinis gyvenimas 1920–1939 m." (PDF). Voruta (in Lithuanian). 2 (644). ISSN 1392-0677.
- Česnulis, Vytautas Valentinas (2015a). Nutilę varpai (PDF) (in Lithuanian). Trakai: Voruta. ISBN 978-609-8102-08-6.
- Česnulis, Vytautas Valentinas (30 May 2015b). ""Nuodėmingos" knygelės" (PDF). Voruta (in Lithuanian). 5 (811). ISSN 1392-0677.
- Ereminas, Gintautas (2020). "Lietuvių šv. Kazimiero draugijos veikla Vilniaus krašte: 1926–1940 m." (PDF). Gimtasai kraštas (in Lithuanian). 18: 20–52. ISSN 2029-0101.
- Lavrijaniec, Tomaš (2008). Lietuvių Šv. Kazimiero draugijos veikla Vilniaus krašte 1925-1937 metais ir jos santykiai su Lenkijos administracija (PDF) (Master's thesis) (in Lithuanian). Vilnius University.
- Mackonis, Rapolas (2011). "Litewski kler Wilna w latach międzywojennych w świetle wspomnień Rapolasa Mackonisa". Krakowskie pismo kresowe (in Polish). 3. Translated by Pecela, Kamil: 141–174. ISSN 2392-120X.
- Misius, Kazys (2018). "Lietuvių šv. Kazimiero draugija ir jos skyriai Suvalkų apskrityje 1926–1936" (PDF). Terra Jatwezenorum. 10, part 2: 54–83, 316, 333–334. ISSN 2080-7589.
- Murka, Jonas Pijus (19 June 2014). "Lietuviai Vilniaus krašte (2)" (PDF). Mokslo Lietuva (in Lithuanian). 12 (522).
- Panavas, Antanas (10 January 2003). ""Vilniaus aušrą" ir jos redaktorių prisiminus". XXI amžius (in Lithuanian). 3 (1107). ISSN 2029-1299.
- "Trakai – kun. Vincento Taškūno tremties vieta". Voruta (in Lithuanian). 7–11 (697–701). 10 April – 5 June 2010. ISSN 1392-0677.
