= Švenčionys Ghetto =

Nazi ghetto in occupied Lithuania

Coordinates: 55°08′04″N 26°09′28″E

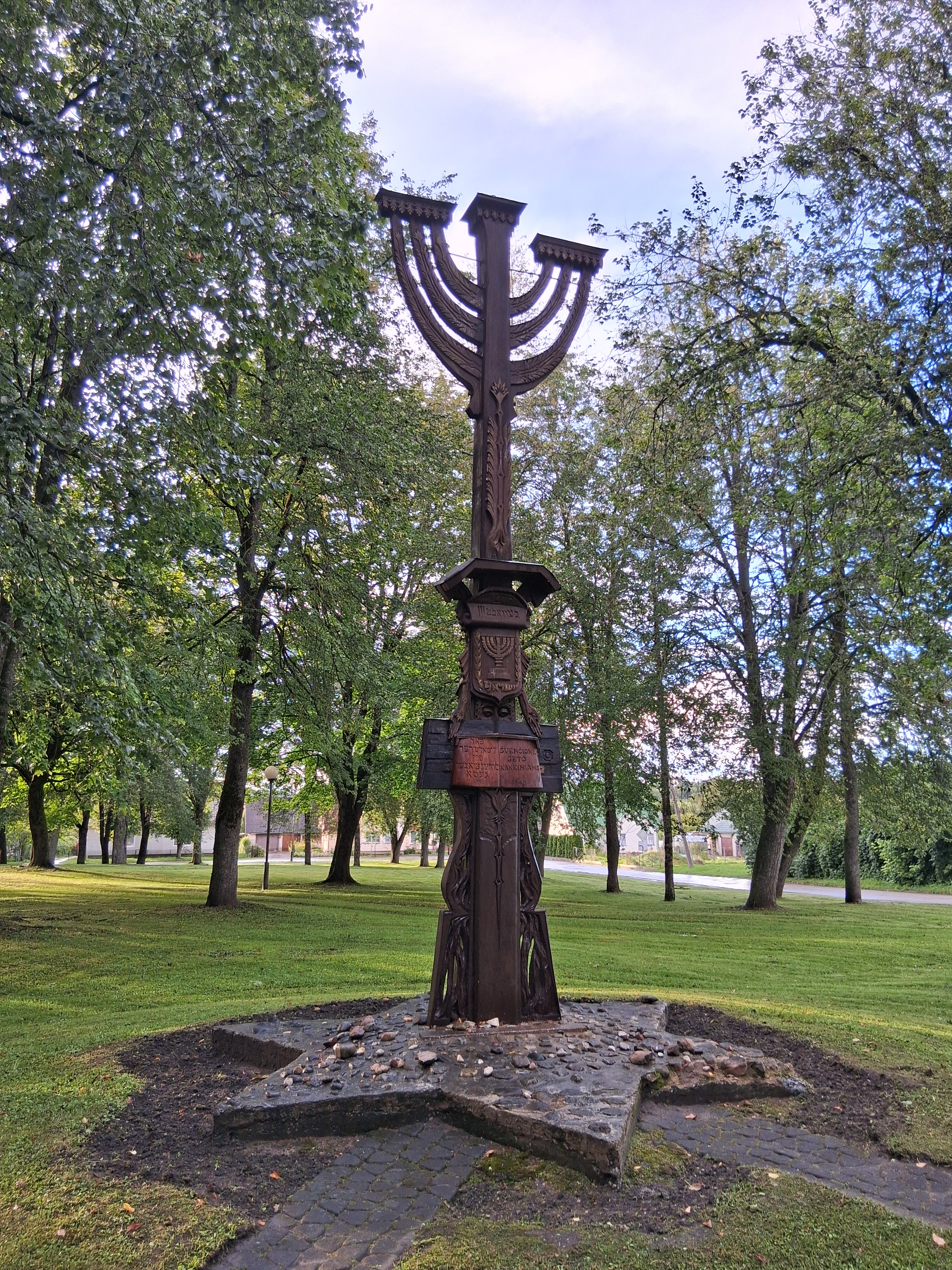
A sculpture commemorating the victims of the ghetto

Švenčionys, Svintsyan or Święciany Ghetto was a Jewish ghetto in Nazi-occupied Švenčionys (pre-war Second Polish Republic, post-war Lithuanian SSR). It operated from July 1941 to April 1943. At its peak, the ghetto housed some 1,500 prisoners. It was located in what today is a city park; the location is marked by a wooden menorah carved by Juozapas Jakštas (first in early 1990s, second in 2011).

== Establishment and operations ==
Before the war, Švenčionys had about 9,000 residents of whom a third were Jewish. The ghetto was established soon after the Nazi Germany attacked Soviet Russia on June 22, 1941. At the end of September 1941, about 1,000 or 2,000 of Švenčionys Jews were moved to barracks of former military training grounds near Švenčionėliai. Jews from other nearby settlements were gathered there as well. These Jews were massacred on October 9–10 by Nazis and Lithuanians from the Ypatingasis būrys. The Jäger Report reported a total of 3,726 deaths (1,169 men, 1,840 women, 717 children).

The ghetto in Švenčionys continued to function. It was surrounded by a barbed wire fence and guarded by armed guards. The territory was divided to four quarters, each having its own Jewish commandant. Additionally, the ghetto had a five-member Judenrat (council). According to a census of August 1942, the ghetto had 566 Jews, including 353 working men and women.

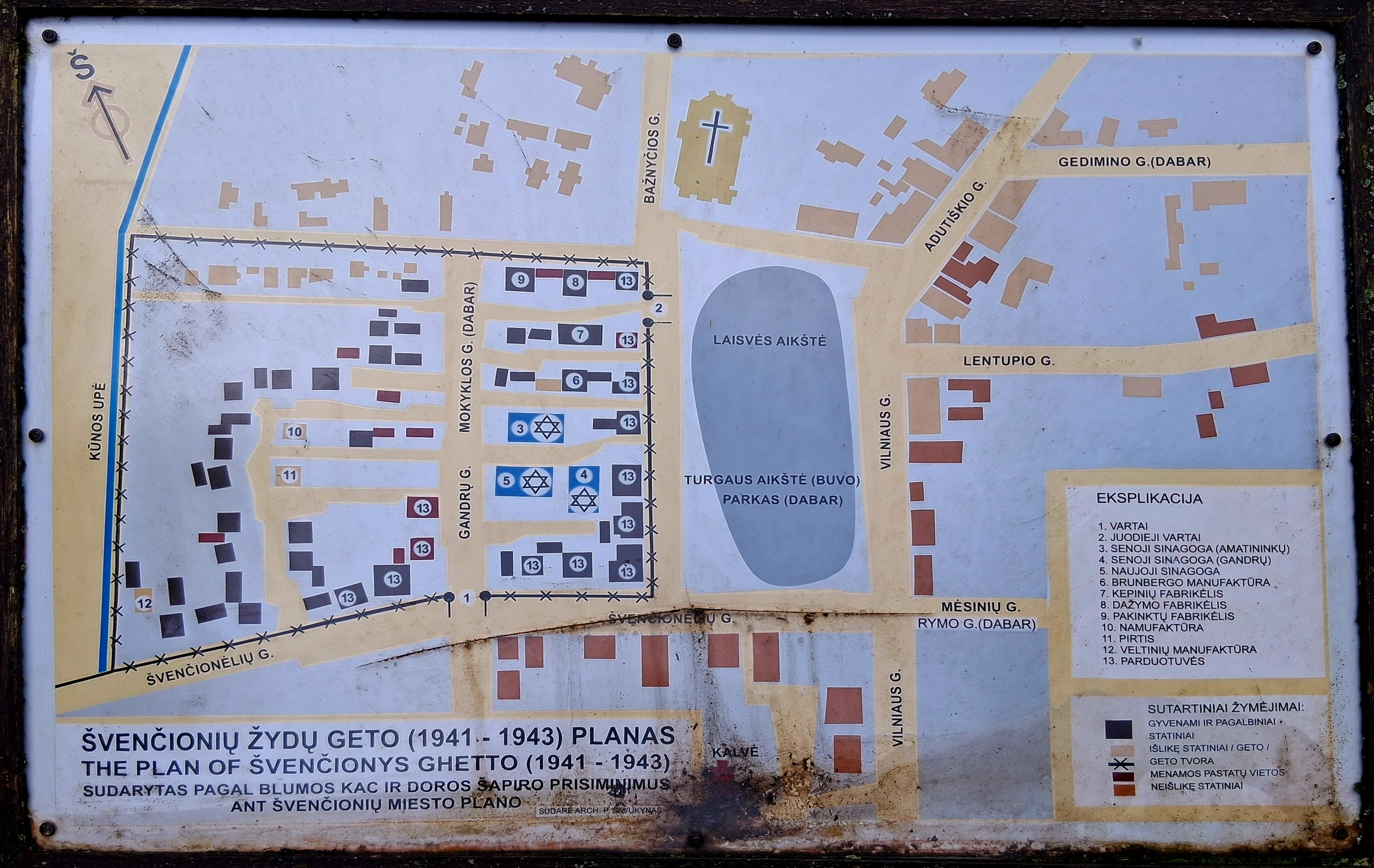
Plan of the ghetto

Younger inmates began procuring weapons and establishing contacts with the Soviet partisans active in the region (now eastern Lithuania and western Belarus). A number of Jews escaped and joined Jewish partisans. Nazi officials were forced to strengthen security measures. The first step was liquidating small ghettos in various towns. About 1,000 Jews from the ghetto in Vidzy (modern Belarus) were moved to Švenčionys. Due to crammed and unsanitary conditions, a typhus epidemic broke out among the inmates. The epidemic was contained with the help from a group of Jewish doctors sent from the Vilnius Ghetto.

== Liquidation ==
At the end of 1942, three other small ghettos operated in the area: Michališki (Astravyets District), Soly (Smarhon' District), and Ashmyany. Due to increased partisan activities, it was decided to liquidate the four ghettos in spring 1943. To minimize resistance, Jewish policemen from Vilnius Ghetto were brought in to facilitate the operation. About 2,700 able-bodied Jews were transferred to Vilnius Ghetto or work camps in Žiežmariai, Žasliai, or Kena. On April 4, the remaining Jews boarded onto a freight train in Švenčionėliai. They were told that they would be transported to Kaunas Ghetto. Instead, the train stopped at Paneriai. Five train cars were redirected to a work camp in Bezdonys, two other cars with members of the Judenrat were taken to Vilnius Ghetto. Few others managed to escape, but the vast majority were shot by German and Lithuanian policemen. According to Nazi sources, about 4,000 Jews were killed on April 5 at Paneriai.

== See also ==
- Švenčionėliai massacre
