= Savigyna =

Savigyna (transl. self-defence) or Vietinė savisauga (transl. local self-defence) consisted of voluntary units formed from the local population to protect villagers from the raids of the armed Soviet underground during the German occupation of Lithuania during World War II. Although originally banned, German authorities provided moderate support by 1943–44.

== Organization of self defence forces ==
Immediately after the German occupation of Lithuania, rebel groups formed during the uprising of June 1941 were disbanded.

In order to prevent movements for Lithuanian autonomy, the German occupation force disarmed the units and restricted the activities of the self-defense initiatives. Self-defense functions were delegated to the Lithuanian Police and Auxiliary Police reserve units, ensuring allowed a strict control of membership of those loyal to the regime. The organization of local armed defense structures was prevented, while unarmed volunteer groups were controlled by self-governing Lithuanian authorities and the local people.

Following the orders of German administration the so-called "night guard" groups, formed in areas with large concentrations of partisans, were created to protect the villages in the region. As firearms were not provided the "night guards" equipped themselves with sticks. Their duty was to carry out surveillance, to detain suspicious persons and to warn both police and people of possible danger. As late as the autumn of 1943, these "night guard" groups were the only self-defense organizations that really existed. In summer 1943 the first groups of loyal residents were armed for operations against banditry. Furthermore, the Lithuanian administrations unsuccessfully attempted to negotiate the revival of the Riflemen Union. By the autumn of 1943 the coordinated Soviet underground activities forced the German authorities to allow armed self-defense bodies in Lithuania.

== Changes in 1943 ==
In the summer of 1943 the Germans lost their strategic initiative on the Eastern Front and were dislodged far to the West. Lithuania was no longer a remote and quiet country to protect their rear. Due to unsuccessful military and labour mobilization, and spreading armed underground activities of the Soviets, the German forces consolidated the mass repressions in Lithuania, but proclaimed the locals responsible for the acts of sabotage.

In an attempt to protect the Lithuanians from the terror of Soviet partisans and the retaliation of the Germans, the Lithuanian administrations volunteered to form armed security units consisting of about 30,000 men. These units were to act under the supervision of the regional authorities. During negotiations with the Germans in early September 1943 principle agreements on the establishment of these units were made, however the Lithuanians were forced to equip the squads themselves. The local defence (self-defense) units as planned were to be established in villages, boroughs and towns. Their task was to protect the "property and residents of the living sites", and generally fight against the "banditry of the Bolshevik elements". Moreover, a separate military unit of 3,000 men was to be formed to defend the major communication roads and objects, and to support the local squads.

The armed local defence structures were formed under complicated conditions. The German officers were in disagreement, some considered the establishment of the armed local defense as an undeserved privilege, considering the 'trivial' involvement of Lithuania in World War II. The national underground activists were tempted by the prospect of benefit from the local defence structures through receiving German armament. Despite this, the activists were suspicious about the creation of the armed structures, as they could be employed for the wider German interests beyond Lithuania. Moreover, the members of the armed structures were at risk of repressions by the armed Soviet underground. The creation of the local defence system was largely obstructed by the German authorities because of these issues.

The local defence units were armed from the reserves of the Lithuanian police and through self-armament by the members themselves.

Despite inauspicious factors and conditions, the self-defence structure was established nationwide. Its activities left significant traces in areas where the armed Soviet underground existed. The establishment and activities of the armed local defence units, especially in the southeastern and eastern Lithuania, was a massive phenomenon during the Nazi German occupation.

== Clashes with Soviet forces: 1944 ==
The mass occurrence of the armed local defence is evident from ostensive and oblique records from the Soviet underground sources, armed clashes with the Soviet partisans, terror and violence perpetrated against the local defence members, villages and homesteads being burnt, as well as massacres of innocent inhabitants and other repressions. Notable acts of the Soviet partisans were 29 January 1944 burning of the village of Kaniūkai in the Eišiškės county (about 35 casualties) and the village of Bakaloriškės in Trakai region on 12 April 1944. The Soviet partisans intended to harm the local defence groups from these villages as an act of vengeance for their activities; these repressions were perpetrated to suppress local defence as a mass phenomenon. Armed local defence occurred on massive scale, illustrated by the losses of the Soviet partisans during the clashes with the local defense and unsuccessful attempts to advance from the Rūdninkai Forest in the southeast deeper into the country.

Formed from Lithuanian armed squads, which had been formed during the German occupation, the local defense suited the needs of the Lithuanians rather than the German occupiers. The armed local defence became a widespread resistance movement against the armed Soviet underground, most notably in southeast Lithuania, and was mainly fought by the local peasantry in an attempt to defend their homeland.

== See also ==
- Lithuanian Territorial Defense Force
- Forest Brothers

== Sources ==
- Zizas, Rimantas (2001). "Vietinė savisauga (savigyna) Lietuvoje nacių Vokietijos okupacijos metais (1941–1944): I dalis". Genocidas ir Rezistencija (in Lithuanian). 2 (10). Lietuvos gyventojų genocido ir rezistencijos tyrimo centras.
- Zizas, Rimantas (2002). "Vietinė savisauga (savigyna) Lietuvoje nacių Vokietijos okupacijos metais (1941–1944): II dalis". Genocidas ir Rezistencija (in Lithuanian). 1 (11). Lietuvos gyventojų genocido ir rezistencijos tyrimo centras.
