= Lyntupy =

Urban-type settlement in Vitebsk Region, Belarus

Lyntupy Лынтупы
- Urban-type settlement
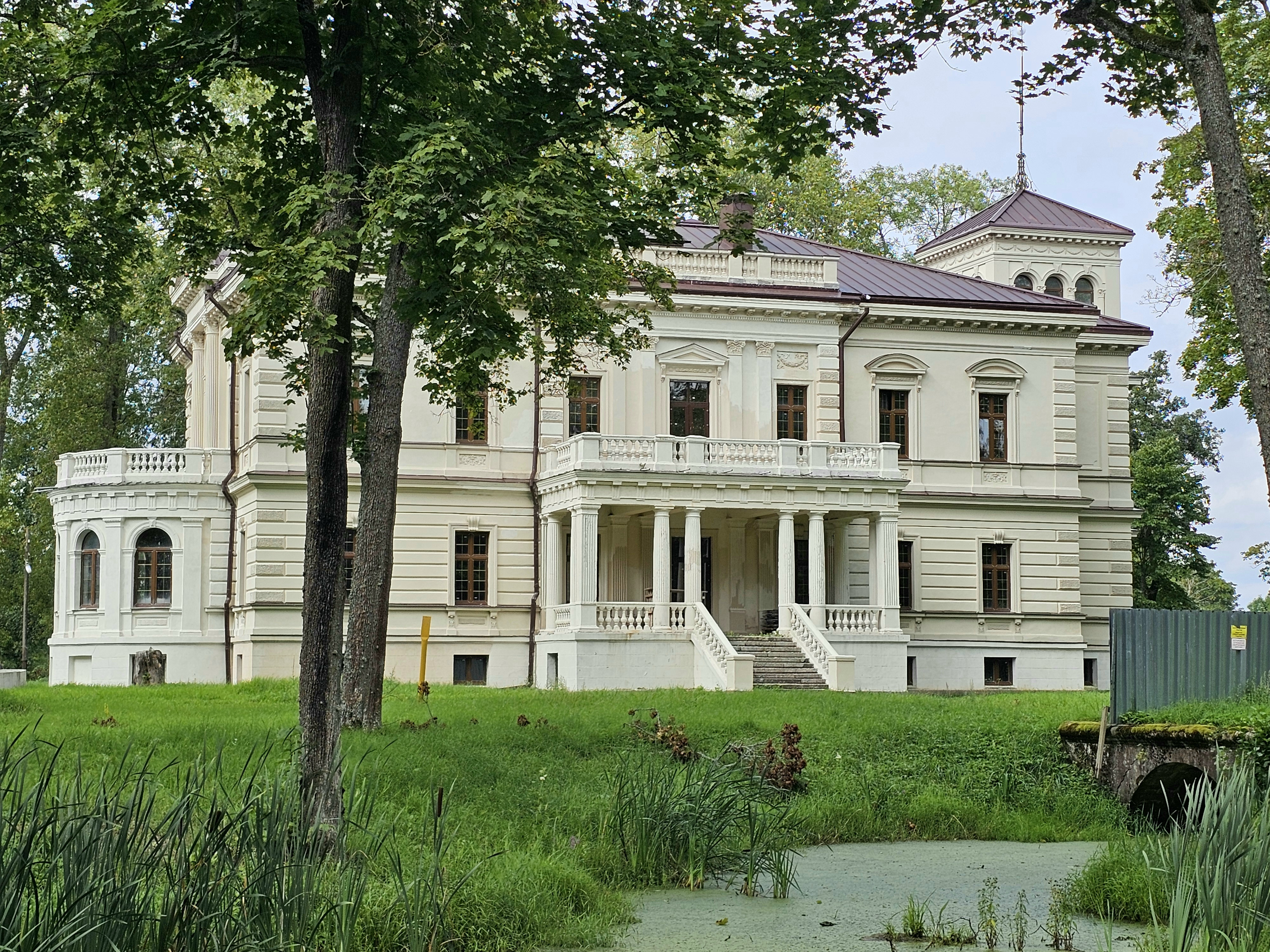
- Biszewski Manor

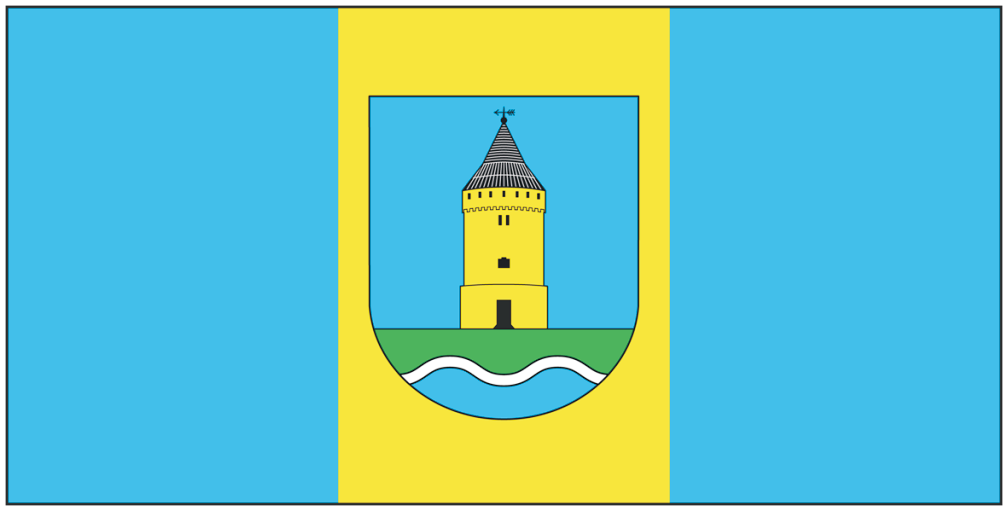
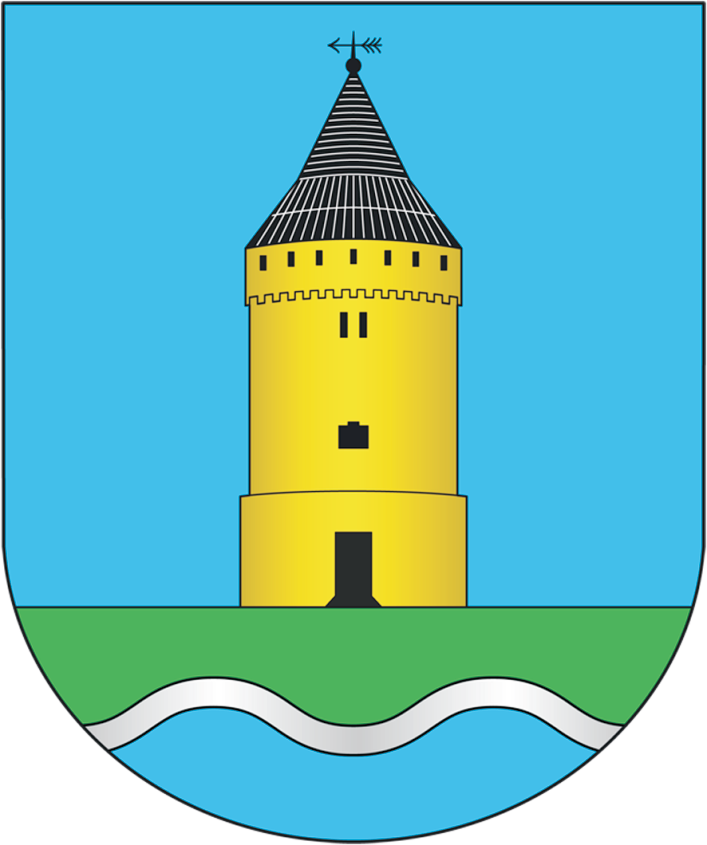
- Flag Coat of arms

- Location within Belarus
- Coordinates: 55°03′N 26°19′E
- Country: Belarus
- Region: Vitebsk Region
- District: Pastavy District

Population (2025)
  - Total: 1,086
- Time zone: UTC+3 (MSK)

Lyntupy (Belarusian: Лынтупы; Russian: Лынтупы; Polish: Łyntupy) is an urban-type settlement in Pastavy District, Vitebsk Region, in northern Belarus. As of 2025, it has a population of 1,086.

== History ==
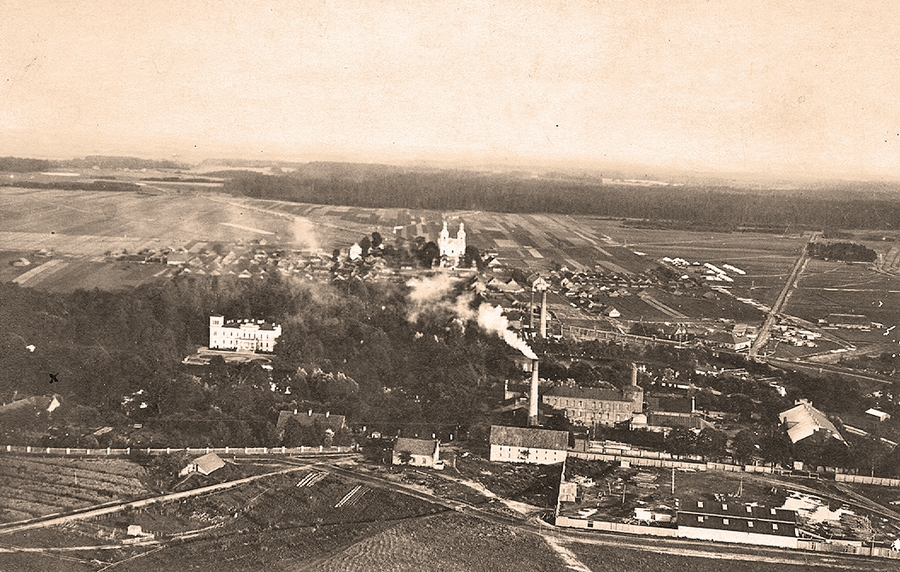
Aerial view in 1916

It was a private town, administratively located in the Vilnius Voivodeship of the Polish–Lithuanian Commonwealth. The local parish church was founded in 1459 by Andrzej Dołgirdowicz, and renovated in 1870 by Jan Brzostowski. Following the Third Partition of Poland in 1795, it was annexed by Russia. In 1866, the town had a population of 477, 85.1% Catholic, 10.5% Jewish and 2.3% Orthodox by confession. In the interwar period, it was part of newly reborn Poland.

== Sights ==
Local landmarks are the Biszewski Manor and the Church of Saint Andrew the Apostle.

== Demographics ==
Historical population
| Year | Pop. | ±% |
|---|---|---|
| 1866 | 477 | — |
| 2009 | 1,609 | +237.3% |

Distribution of the population by ethnicity according to the 2009 census:

| | percent |
| Belarusians | 79.86% |
| Poles | 9.26% |
| Russians | 8.89% |
| Lithuanians | 0.68% |
| Ukrainians | 0.44% |
| Tatars | 0.37% |

== Climate ==
Climate data for Lyntupy (1991–2020)
| Month | Jan | Feb | Mar | Apr | May | Jun | Jul | Aug | Sep | Oct | Nov | Dec | Year |
|---|---|---|---|---|---|---|---|---|---|---|---|---|---|
| Record high °C (°F) | 4.2 (39.6) | 5.2 (41.4) | 12.2 (54.0) | 22.0 (71.6) | 26.4 (79.5) | 28.5 (83.3) | 30.4 (86.7) | 29.8 (85.6) | 24.8 (76.6) | 17.6 (63.7) | 10.1 (50.2) | 5.7 (42.3) | 30.4 (86.7) |
| Mean daily maximum °C (°F) | −2.1 (28.2) | −1.1 (30.0) | 3.9 (39.0) | 12.1 (53.8) | 18.1 (64.6) | 21.4 (70.5) | 23.5 (74.3) | 22.6 (72.7) | 16.9 (62.4) | 9.7 (49.5) | 3.4 (38.1) | −0.6 (30.9) | 10.7 (51.3) |
| Daily mean °C (°F) | −4.4 (24.1) | −4.1 (24.6) | −0.2 (31.6) | 6.5 (43.7) | 12.2 (54.0) | 15.7 (60.3) | 17.8 (64.0) | 16.7 (62.1) | 11.7 (53.1) | 6.1 (43.0) | 1.2 (34.2) | −2.6 (27.3) | 6.4 (43.5) |
| Mean daily minimum °C (°F) | −6.9 (19.6) | −7.0 (19.4) | −3.9 (25.0) | 1.4 (34.5) | 6.2 (43.2) | 10.0 (50.0) | 12.3 (54.1) | 11.3 (52.3) | 7.2 (45.0) | 2.9 (37.2) | −0.8 (30.6) | −4.7 (23.5) | 2.3 (36.1) |
| Record low °C (°F) | −21.0 (−5.8) | −20.0 (−4.0) | −13.8 (7.2) | −6.0 (21.2) | −1.4 (29.5) | 3.5 (38.3) | 6.7 (44.1) | 4.8 (40.6) | −0.5 (31.1) | −5.2 (22.6) | −10.2 (13.6) | −14.8 (5.4) | −21.0 (−5.8) |
| Average precipitation mm (inches) | 53.5 (2.11) | 47.2 (1.86) | 46.8 (1.84) | 44.1 (1.74) | 60.8 (2.39) | 74.2 (2.92) | 79.6 (3.13) | 75.5 (2.97) | 62.2 (2.45) | 67.6 (2.66) | 52.7 (2.07) | 54.7 (2.15) | 718.9 (28.30) |
| Average precipitation days (≥ 1.0 mm) | 12.5 | 11.4 | 10.3 | 8.3 | 9.4 | 10.5 | 10.8 | 9.8 | 9.4 | 10.5 | 11.4 | 12.2 | 126.5 |
Source: NOAA
