= Švenčionėliai =

- Village
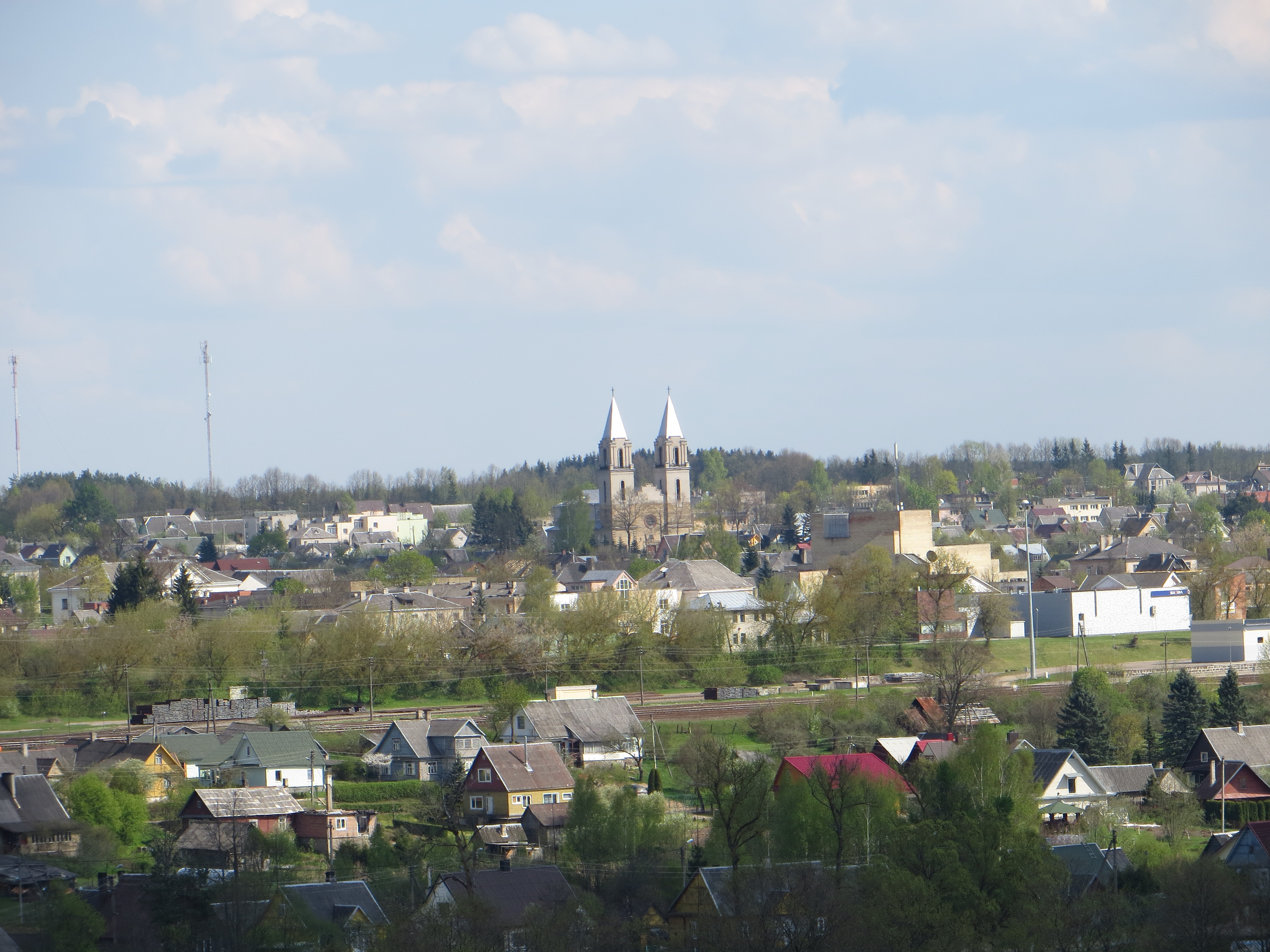
- Švenčionėliai panorama

- Coat of arms

- Location of Švenčionėliai
- Coordinates: 55°10′N 26°0′E
- Country: Lithuania
- Ethnographic region: Aukštaitija
- County: Vilnius County
- Municipality: Švenčionys district municipality
- Eldership: Švenčionėliai eldership
- Capital of: Švenčionėliai eldership
- First mentioned: End of the 16th century
- Granted village rights: 1920

Area
  - Total: 6 km^{2} (2.3 sq mi)

Population (2021)
  - Total: 4,748
- Time zone: UTC+2 (EET)
  - Summer (DST): UTC+3 (EEST)

Švenčionėliai is a city in Švenčionys district municipality, in eastern Lithuania 10 km west of Švenčionys. The river Žeimena flows through Švenčionėliai.

== History ==
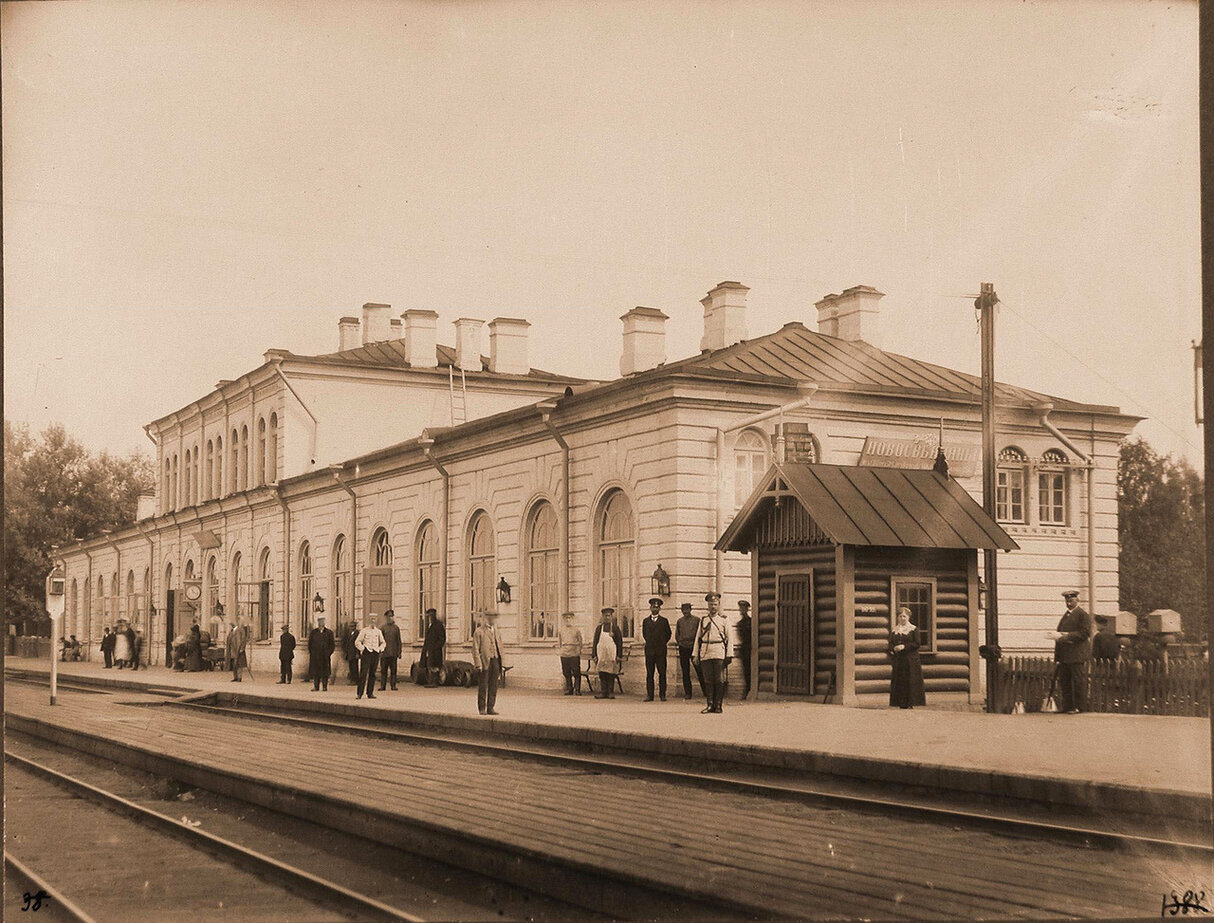
Early-20th-century view of the railway station

On 10 July 1920, it was the site of a battle of the Polish–Soviet War, won by the Russians. Afterwards, in the interwar period, Nowe Święciany, as it was known in Polish, was administratively located in the Święciany County in the Wilno Voivodeship of Poland.

After the joint German-Soviet invasion of Poland, which started World War II in September 1939, the town was occupied by the Soviets, who handed it over to Lithuania, to eventually re-occupy it in 1940, then from 1941 it was occupied by Nazi Germany and in 1944 it was re-occupied by the Soviet Union. Several Poles, who were either born or lived in the town, were murdered by the Russians in the Katyn massacre in 1940. In 1940, there were around 1,000 Jews, i.e. 20 percent of the total population. All of them were murdered in October 1941 in the Švenčionėliai massacre.
