= Švenčionys =

- City
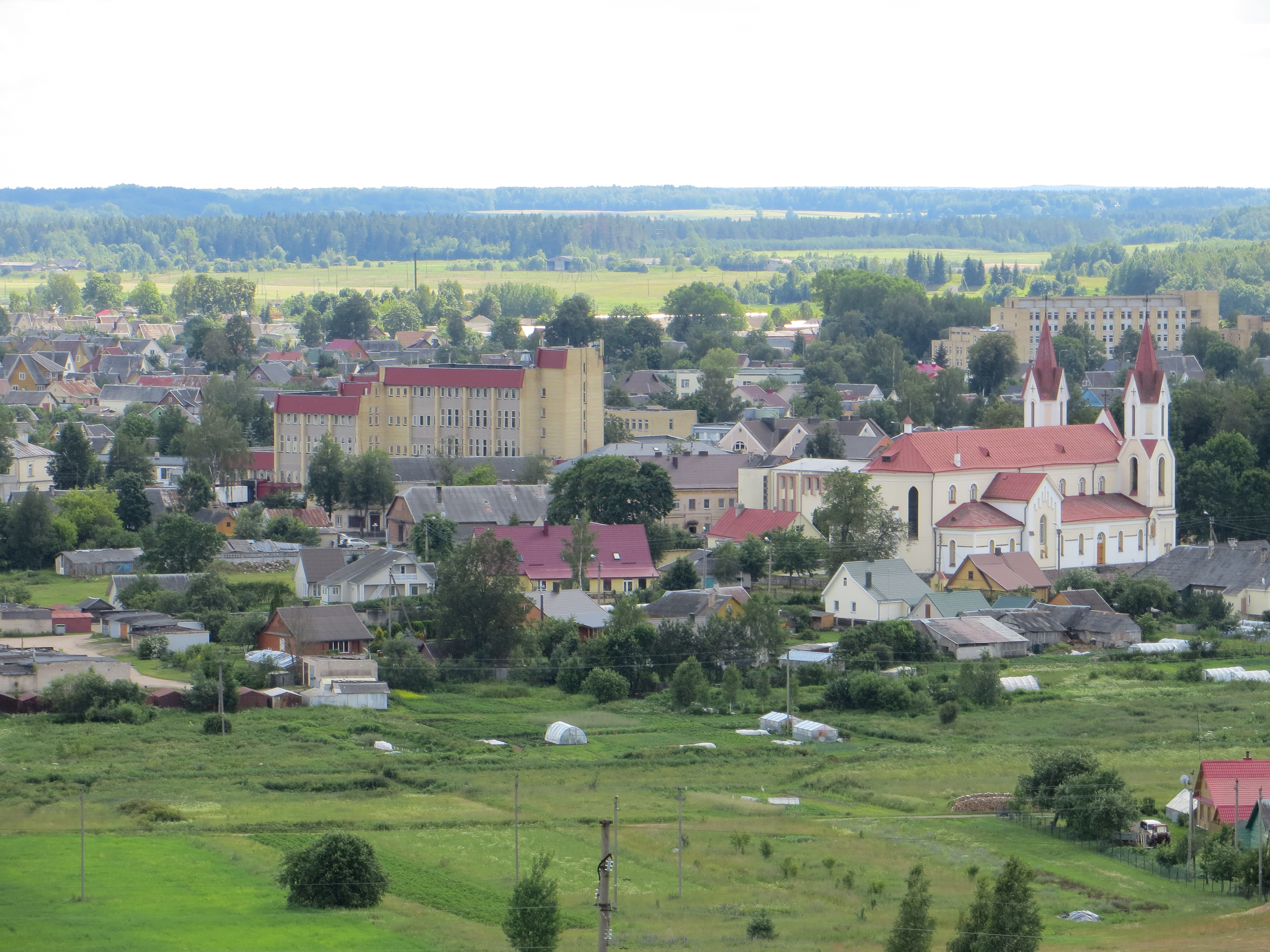
- View of the city with the Church of All Saints on the right

- Flag Coat of arms

- Location of Švenčionys
- Coordinates: 55°08′00″N 26°09′20″E
- Country: Lithuania
- County: Vilnius County
- Municipality: Švenčionys district municipality
- Eldership: Švenčionys eldership
- Capital of: Švenčionys district municipality Švenčionys eldership
- First mentioned: 1486
- City rights: 1800

Population (2021)
  - Total: 4,448
- Time zone: UTC+2 (EET)
  - Summer (DST): UTC+3 (EEST)

Švenčionys (known also by several alternative names) is a city in eastern Lithuania, and capital of the Švenčionys district municipality, located 84 kilometers (52 mi) north of Vilnius. As of 2020, it had a population of 4,065 of which about 17% were part of the Polish minority in Lithuania.

== Etymology ==
There are two established hypotheses about the etymology of the Švenčionys name: one that it is the name of the nearby lake Šventas (literally: saint) with the addition of the Lithuanian suffix -onys; another is that it is derived from the personal name, Švenčionis. In other languages the name is rendered as Polish: Święciany, Belarusian: Свянця́ны/Svianciany, Russian: Свентя́ны/Sventiany, Yiddish: סווינציאַן, romanized: Svintsyán, and German: Schwintzen.

== History ==
One of the oldest towns in the Grand Duchy of Lithuania, the settlement was a major center of Nalšia. Grand Duke Vytautas settled Lipka Tatars in the town and built a Catholic church in 1414. The place grew from the 14th to 16th centuries, becoming the site of a local court and monastery.

After the Third Partition of Poland–Lithuania in 1795, Švenčionys came under Russian rule. From 1801 the town was part of the Russian Vilna Governorate.

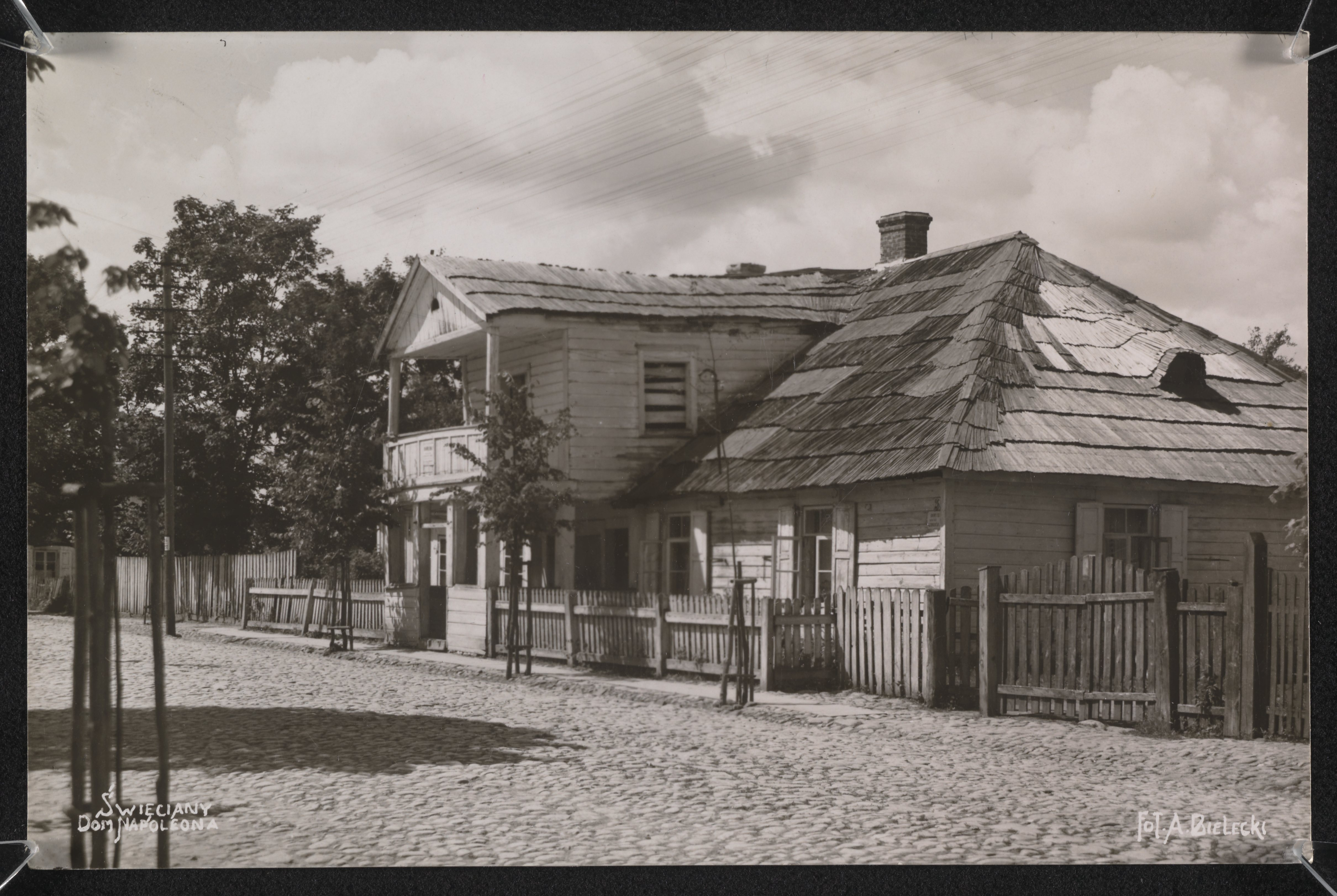
Place of stay of Napoleon in 1812, photo from 1938

During the 1812 French invasion of Russia, Napoleon stayed in the town for 12 hours to write orders and receive an envoy from the King of Naples. The town was one of the main centers of the November Uprising (1830–1831) in Poland and Lithuania against the Russian Empire.

It grew significantly after completion of the Saint Petersburg–Warsaw Railway in 1862, but eventually was out-competed by Švenčionėliai, which grew up around the train station. At the turn of the 20th century the town had one Greek Orthodox church and one Roman Catholic church. During World War I, it was the location of the German Sventiany Offensive.

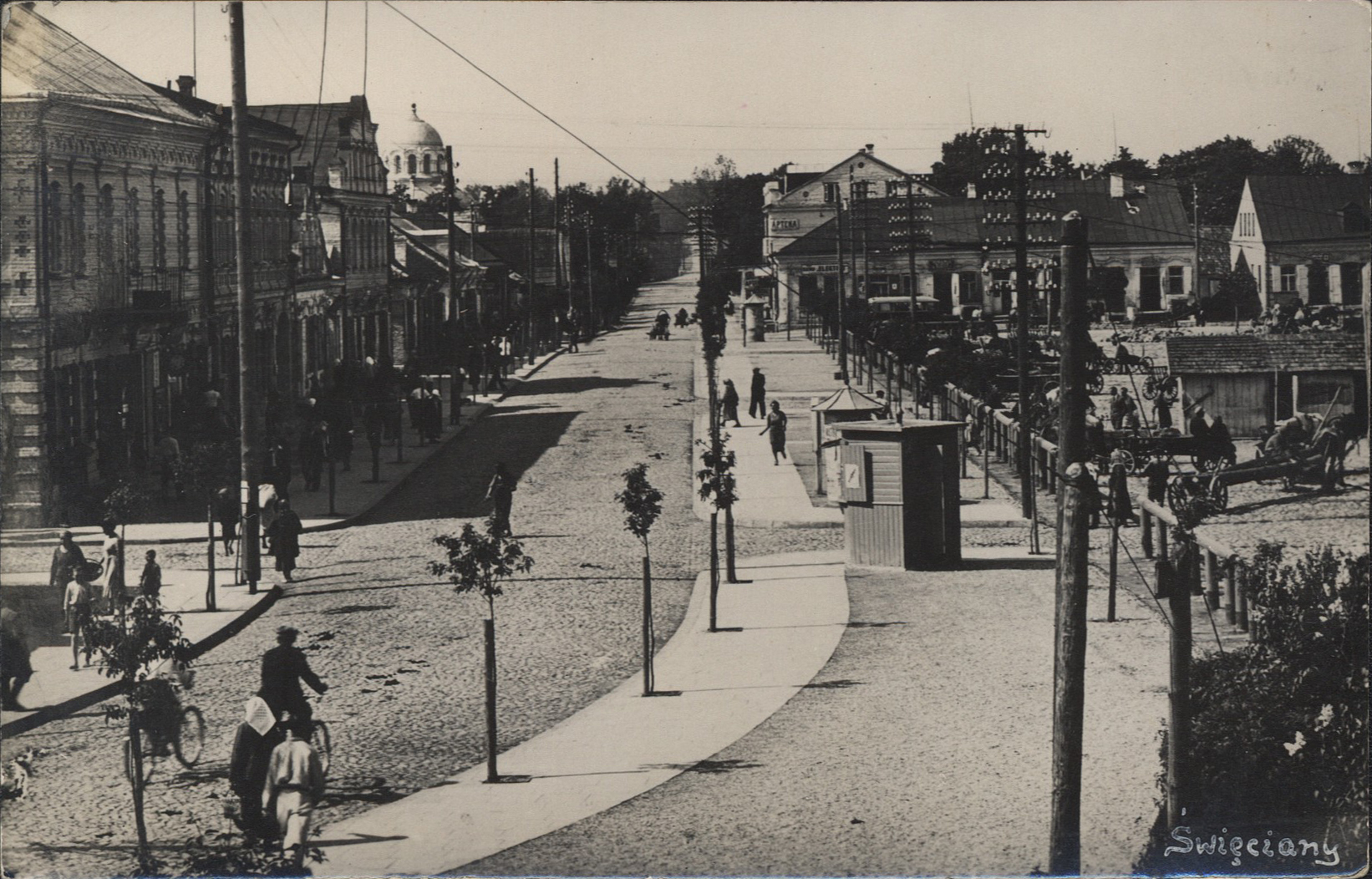
Święciany in the 1930s

The city was part of the Second Polish Republic for most of the interwar period. It was a powiat centre in Wilno Voivodeship as Święciany under Polish times between 1920 and 1939. It had a significant Jewish population (according to the 1897 Russian census – 52%), but during World War II, under German occupation, the Švenčionys Ghetto was established. It operated from July 1941 to April 1943. At its peak, the ghetto housed some 1,500 prisoners. The Jewish inhabitants were deported and murdered.

On 18 September 1939, Švenčionys was occupied by the Red Army and, on 14 November 1939, incorporated into the Byelorussian SSR. The Soviets placed it first in part of Vileyka Oblast of the Belorussian SSR in 1939, then into the Lithuanian SSR on 25 November 1940. Over 15 Poles, who were either born, educated or lived in the town, including the local Polish police chief, were murdered by the Russians in the Katyn massacre in 1940. The town was occupied by the German Army from 27 June 1941 to 7 July 1944 and placed under the administration of the Generalbezirk Litauen of Reichskommissariat Ostland. In 1942 the Lithuanian Security Police murdered several hundred Poles in the village. Most of the municipal area remained part of the Lithuanian SSR except the Ashmyany region which was reincorporated into Belarus in 1944.

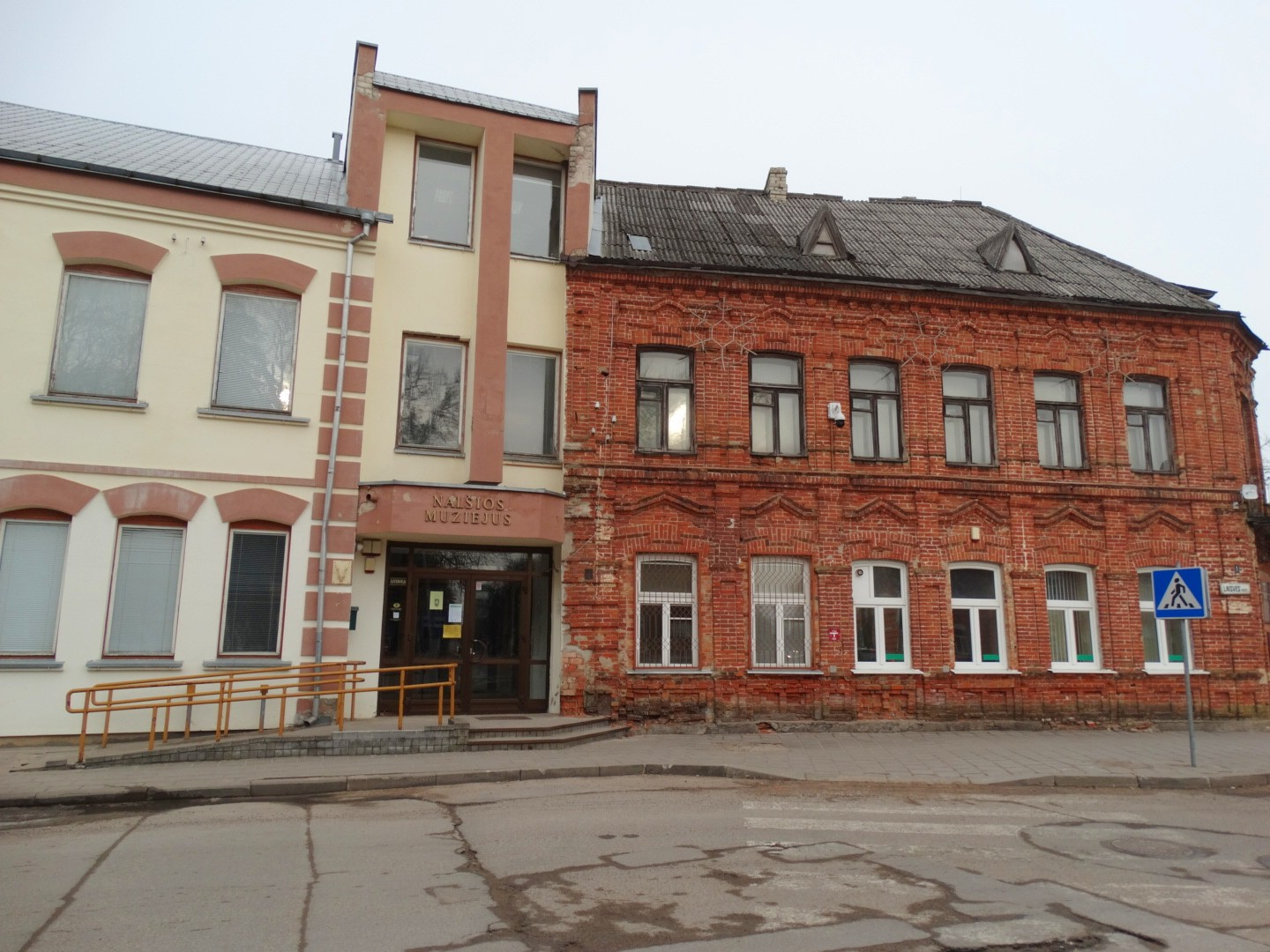
Museum

== Demographics ==
Historical population

Year	Pop.	±%
1833	1,128	—
1880	6,795	+502.4%
1897	6,025	−11.3%

Year	Pop.	±%
1931	5,893	−2.2%
1959	4,006	−32.0%
1970	4,617	+15.3%

== Notable residents ==
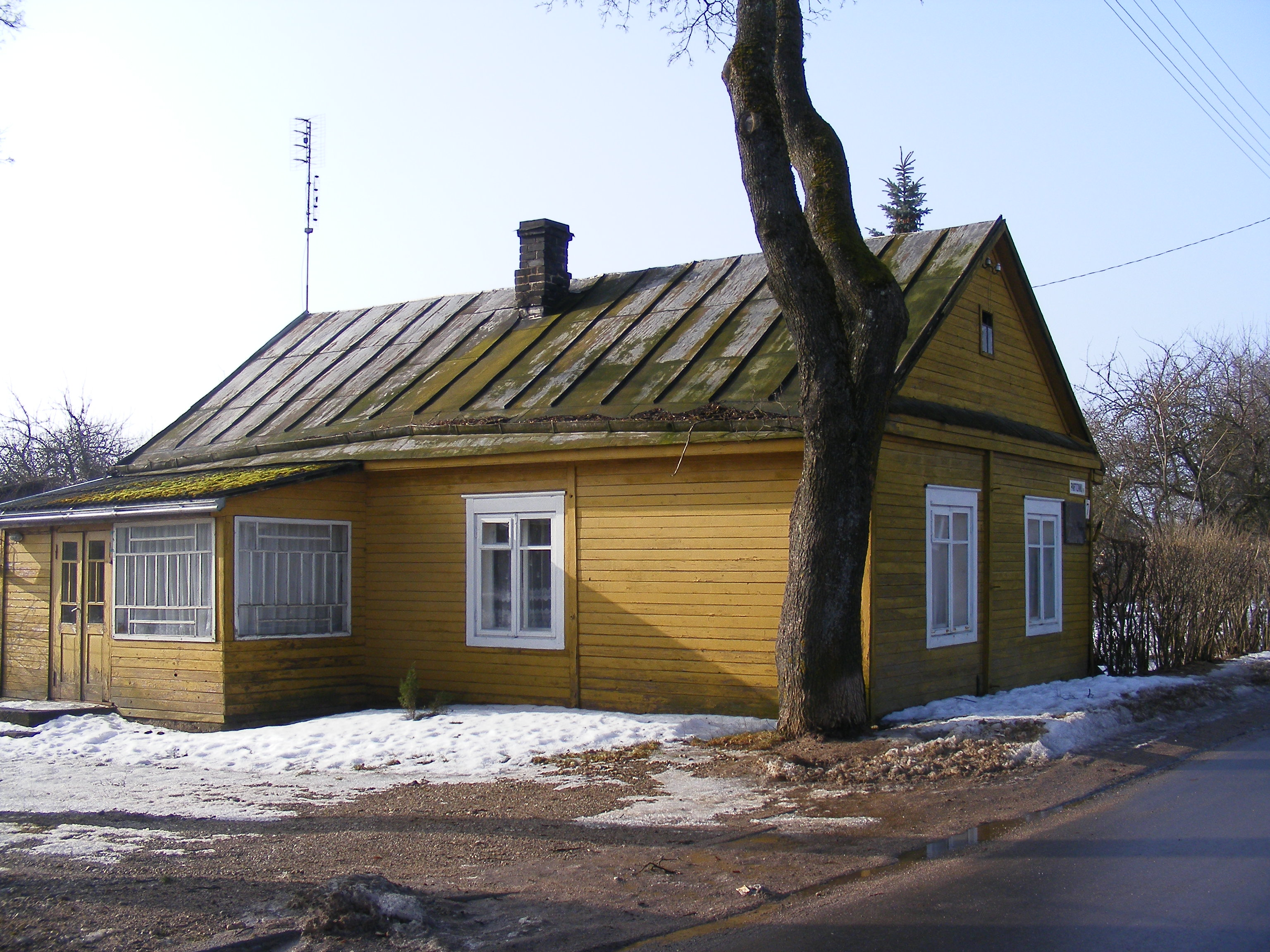
Birthplace and childhood home of Franciszek Żwirko

- Yitzhak Arad (1926–2021), Israeli historian, director of Yad Vashem from 1972 to 1993
- Mordecai Kaplan (1881–1983), Rabbi and founder of the Reconstructionist Judaism movement
- Mark Natanson (1850–1919), Russian revolutionary
- Wiktor Thommée (1881–1962), Polish general
- Franciszek Żwirko (1895–1932), Polish aviator
- Menke Katz (1906–1991), Yiddish-language poet
- Jacob Samuel Minkin (1885–1962), American rabbi, hospital chaplain, and expert on Hasidism
