= Glinciszki massacre =

1944 mass murder of Polish civilians in German-occupied Lithuania

Glinciszki (Glitiškės) massacre
- Part of World War II
- Glitiškės (Lithuania)
- Location: 54°59′10″N 25°13′30″E; Glinciszki (Wilno Voivodeship, Poland, under German occupation)
- Date: 20 June 1944
- Target: Polish civilians
- Attack type: Massacre, War crime
- Deaths: 39
- Perpetrators: 3rd Company, 258th Lithuanian Police Battalion: Petras Polekauskas
- No. of participants: ~50
- Motive: Revenge for the deaths of 4 policemen

The Glinciszki massacre (Polish: Zbrodnia w Glinciszkach; Lithuanian: Glitiškių žudynės) was a mass murder of Polish civilians by the German-subordinated 258th Lithuanian Police Battalion, committed on 20 June 1944 in the village of Glinciszki (now Glitiškės in Lithuania) during World War II. During the massacre, 39 civilians were murdered, including 11 women (one in an advanced stage of pregnancy), 11 children, and 6 elderly men. They were executed as a collective punishment for the death of four Lithuanian auxiliary policemen the previous evening.

As revenge, the Home Army (Polish: Armia Krajowa, abbreviated AK) brigade of Zygmunt Szendzielarz killed at least 68 Lithuanian civilians, three-quarters of whom were women and children, by the end of June 1944 in Dubingiai and its surroundings as part of the Dubingiai massacre.

== Background ==
Before the war, Glitiškės was located on the Polish side of the Polish-Lithuanian border. Glitiškės village consisted of a large estate, the centre of which was the manor house of the Jeleński family, surrounded by farm buildings and a landscape park. Near the manor house was the Glitiškės Annex, where most of the employees of the manor lived. .

It was a mixed nationality region, where national self-identification was fluid and some of the respondents tended to identify with the current state authority, which then translated into their declared nationality, therefore, the results of the German census of 1916 seem to be relatively reliable. According to it, in the Širvintos district, which included Glitiškės, Poles made up 74.2%, while Lithuanians accounted for 19.9%. The Polish census of 1919 estimated the percentage of Poles in Paberžė municipality, which included Glitiškės, at 94%. According to the Polish geographer Stanisław Gorzuchowski, Poles made up 87.7% of the population in 1928. In contrast, in the census of 1942, conducted by the occupational German authorities, in the same municipality, Poles were 52.5% of the population and Lithuanians were 41.7%. However, this census cannot be considered reliable because it was taken during a period of heightened terror against the Polish population, just seven days after the May 20, 1942 murder of Poles in the Švenčionys district by Lithuanian police. By various means, the Lithuanians spread rumors that after the elimination of the Jews, the next to be exterminated would be Poles. Some also believe that the results themselves were falsified by the administration.

After the outbreak of war, the village fell under Soviet occupation, and later, together with the whole Vilnius region, was handed over to Lithuania. A period of persecution of the Polish population and removal of the Polish language from the public sphere began. Józef Koneczny, the headmaster of the school in Paberžė, and his wife Ludmiła, who taught there, were dismissed from the school and settled in Glitiškės.

During the Nazi occupation, the Glitiškės Manor was administrated by Edward Żywiecki, on behalf of Landbewirtschaftungsgesellschaft Ostland, a company administering nationalised agricultural estates in Ostland's territory. The village was dominated by Poles, many of whom were members or supporters of the Polish underground. Partisans of the Home Army often used the farm to get supplies.

== Polish ambush ==
The Polish partisans decided to organize an ambush on the Lithuanian auxiliary policemen located in Paberžė. On 20 June 1944, around 3:30 AM, a unit of Polish partisans, pretending to be Russian-speaking bandits, robbed the estate of several cattle. The estate manager notified the police company in Paberžė, 5 kilometres (3.1 mi) away from Glitiškės, about the incident.

Lieutenant Petras Polekauskas, commander of 258th Lithuanian Police Battalion's 3rd Company, sent a group of eight or nine to investigate. The scouts ran into the Home Army 5th Wilno Brigade, under the command of Wiktor Wiącek "Rakoczy" and Antoni Rymsza "Maks"; four were killed, two were injured, and two escaped. According to a bulletin of the Lithuanian Liberation Army, the four dead Lithuanians were first injured and then bayoneted to death.

== Massacre ==
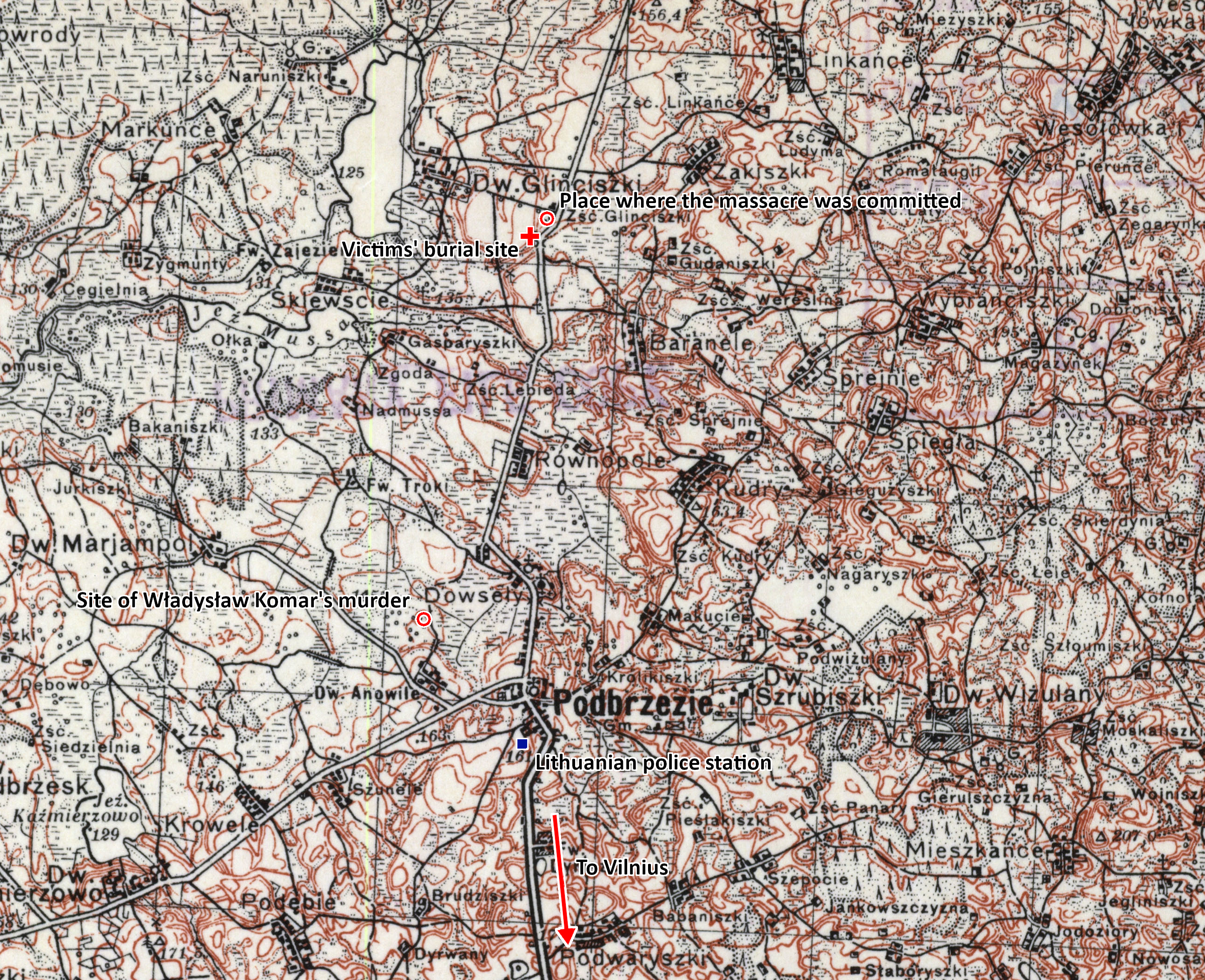
Map showing the location of the Glinciszki massacre and the events that accompanied it

Within hours, a company of about 50 men from the 258th Battalion led by Petras Polekauskas arrived in Glitiškės. The Polish partisans were no longer there. Upon their arrival in Glitiškės, the Lithuanian policemen collected the dead. Then Polekauskas ordered them to gather the manor's workers, who were mainly people living near the manor (the so-called Glitiškės Annex and the Versminė (Polish: Wierśminie) village), as well as some random people. In total, a group of 40 people were gathered near the manor. They were interrogated by Lithuanian policemen, who demanded information in Lithuanian about the direction of the Polish unit's departure. Only Władysław Klukowski answered this question in Lithuanian, thanks to which he was spared; the others were shot. Three people were not immediately killed: Józef Bałendo, Józef Klukowski, and Wanda Bałendówna. Józef Bałendo, who was wounded in the hand and covered with other bodies, survived, slipping out of the execution site unnoticed.

The residents of the manor itself, which included several families and a group of Ursuline nuns, were spared, but the estate's administrator, Edward Żywiecki, was severely beaten. According to some witnesses, they were spared because the Dutch agricultural instructor stood up for them. Jonas Žvinys, a Lithuanian parish priest from Dubingiai who happened to be passing by on his way to Vilnius, said a prayer for the dead. Lithuanian police officers brought about eight men from Baronėliai village and ordered them to dig a mass grave. While they did so, the policemen killed Klukowski and Bałendówna, the two wounded victims who had not escaped. After the massacre, the policemen took the belongings of the killed families and the school building. After the policemen left, the local population fled into the woods, where they hid for the next few days. Some of the local youths joined the Polish partisans. Soon, Poles erected a cross on the spot where the bodies were buried, but after three days, Lithuanians ordered it to be removed.

Władysław Komar, a member of the AK, but also the administrator of a group of manors as a representative of the occupational German land management company Landbewirtschaftungsgesellschaft Ostland, was informed of events in Glitiškės via phone and arrived at the scene around 2 pm, a few hours after the massacre. After checking the crime scene, he decided to return to Vilnius immediately. He was stopped by Lithuanian policemen on the way in Paberžė. according to later testimonies of policemen, for hiding AK soldiers. The policemen led Komar out in front of the station, and intended to shoot Komar themselves. But as he attempted to run away, they pierced him with bayonets and bludgeoned him to death with rifle butts. His corpse was robbed and his finger with a gold ring was cut off. They then buried his body near the spot where he died.

Wladyslaw Komar was a pre-war citizen of Lithuania, an activist of the Polish minority. After Germany occupied the region in 1941, he took charge of nationalized farms in the Vilnius district. He was one of the few Poles in the administrative apparatus of Generalbezirk Litauen, dominated by Lithuanians. Thanks to his still pre-war contacts with the Lithuanians, he mediated in attempts to reach an agreement between the Polish underground and the Lithuanians. In the spring of 1944, in the face of the approaching Soviet army, the Germans made attempts to win over local Poles, previously discriminated against. They turned primarily to the brothers Wacław and Władysław Studnicki, with Komar mediating the talks. Rumors also circulated about the possible annexation of Vilnius to the General Government. Such an agreement was unequivocally rejected by the Polish underground, but it worried Lithuanian circles. Komar became the main enemy for them. This was probably the reason for his murder by Paberžė policemen. According to one account, the assassins of Władysław Komar were convinced that they had killed Aleksander Krzyżanowski, the commander of the Home Army in the Vilnius region.

Józef Koneczny, who had informed policemen of the theft from the estate, also fell victim to the Lithuanian police. Detained as a suspect in Paberžė, he was tortured and then shot. Mikołaj Dubieniecki was also said to have died in similar circumstances at the police station.

== Aftermath ==
At the widow's request, Władysław Komar's body was exhumed and buried in a family grave in Vilnius on June 24, 1944. On June 26, the remaining victims were exhumed by Lithuanian policemen from the 3rd Company of the 258th Battalion, the same unit that had massacred them. The bodies were buried in a nearby German war cemetery from 1915.

Following the massacre on 21 June, Lieutenant Petras Polekauskas and 11 Lithuanian soldiers were arrested by the Germans, for the execution of Władysław Komar. They were tried by the SS Court; Polekauskas received a death sentence, several others sentences of hard labor, and a few were acquitted. They were all released afterwards. Polekauskas emigrated to America after the war, where he killed himself in 1965.

The day after the crime, the commander of the 5th brigade of the Home Army Zygmunt Szendzielarz "Łupaszko" carried out a "retaliatory action". The situation was obvious to Lithuanian policemen, who fortified themselves in their headquarters in Paberžė and ordered the evacuation of Lithuanian colonists from the area. Łupaszko abandoned the idea of attacking the post, instead taking the lands of pre-war Lithuania as the target. From the outset, the aim was to commit an equally cruel crime against the Lithuanian civilian population, in addition to Lithuanian policemen and members of Lithuanian paramilitary organisations, their family members and military settlers were to be targeted, to frighten Lithuanian society and thus discourage persecution of Polish people. Łupaszko did not command the action himself, entrusting direct command to Lieutenant Wiktor Wiącek "Rakoczy". The action lasted from 22 to 24 June 1944. At least 68 people were murdered, the overwhelming majority of whom were civilians. The action culminated in the Dubingiai massacre.

The AK command of the region did not plan, and had actually strictly forbidden, any reprisals against innocent civilians. Łupaszko acted on his own, without agreement with the AK district commander, Lt. Col. Aleksander Krzyżanowski "Wilk", perhaps even ignoring orders to halt the action and not to take revenge. Wilk gave orders to the Home Army's 2nd Wilno Region Grouping, commanded by Major Mieczysław Potocki "Węgielny", to carry out a "punitive expedition"; the targets were to be Lithuanian troops in German service, not civilians. The expedition unsuccessfully attacked the police station in Paberžė (where the Lithuanians had in the meantime been replaced by an SS detachment) and then proceeded into pre-war Lithuanian territory towards Joniškis, and fought a successful battle with a German detachment on the way back. The operation lasted from 25 June to 2 July; despite the original intention, 13 civilians were killed in the operation, but there were no women or children among them.

In 2015, Polish historian Paweł Rokicki called both the massacres in Glitiškės and Dubingiai (the former committed by the Lithuanian auxiliary police battalion and the latter by the Polish Home Army) war crimes.

== Number of victims ==
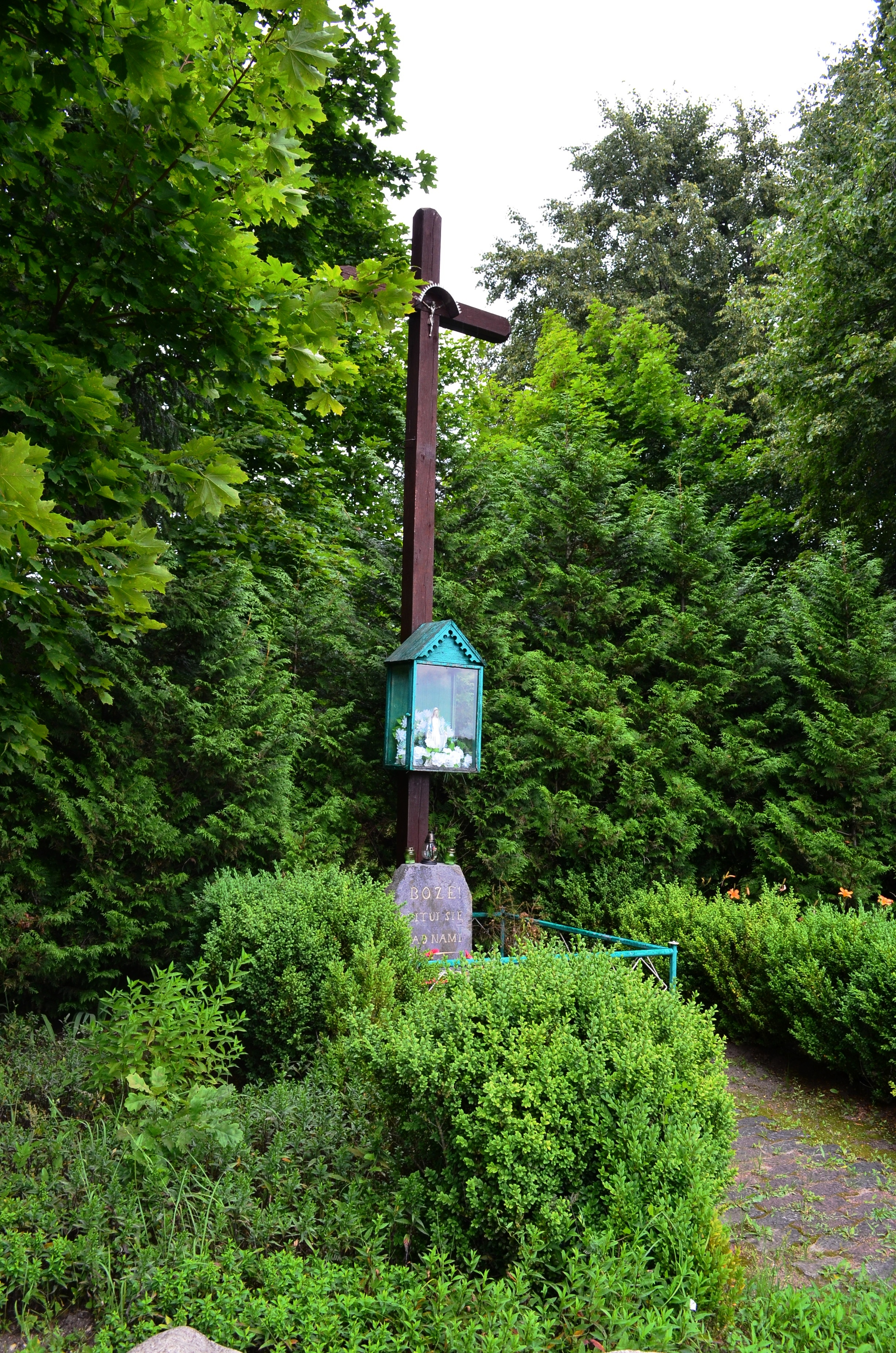
Cross at the sight of the massacre, with the inscription in Polish: God! Have mercy on Us

Both German and Polish reports produced immediately after the events mention 27 dead including Władysław Komar. Aleksander Krzyżanowski specified that five children under the age of 8 and 12 women were killed. A few days later, the dead were exhumed and reburied near the road to Paberžė (Polish: Podbrzezie) in a German war cemetery from 1915. At the same time, a list of the victims was compiled by Irena Sławińska with 39 entries, but later researchers identified that one man was included twice under different surnames, leaving 38 dead. The number of children and women agrees in both Krzyżanowski's and Sławińska's reports. That leaves a discrepancy of 11 men, very likely members of AK killed in the shootout with the Lithuanians. That hypothesis is supported by the fact that two men were listed without names (marked as NN) and another two without given names or ages, which shows that they were not familiar to the locals. According to Paweł Rokicki's estimates, 39 civilians died in the massacre, out of which three are unknown by name.

=== List of victims ===
	First Name	Family name	Birthyear	Age	Place of residence	Additional information
1	Irena	Bałendo	1929	15	Glinciszki (Glitiškės )	
2	Salomea	Bałendo	1898	46	Glinciszki	pregnant
3	Teresa	Bałendo	1941	3	Glinciszki	
4	Wanda	Bałendo	1923	21	Glinciszki	
5	Paweł	Bitowt	1911	33	Glinciszki	
6	Mikołaj	Dubieniecki			Vilnius	killed probably in Paberžė
7		Jankowski	1860	84	Wesołówka (Visalaukė)	
8	Józef	Klukowski	1908	36	Wieśminie (Versminė)	
9	Władysław	Komar	1910	34	Vilnius	killed in Paberžė
10	Ludmiła	Koneczna-Dawlidowicz	1904	30	Glinciszki	teacher
11	Jarosław	Koneczny	1930	14	Glinciszki	
12	Józef	Koneczny	1904	40	Glinciszki	teacher
13	Bohdan	Łukasik	1939	5	Podbrzezie (Paberžė)	
14	Helena	Łukasik	1911	33	Podbrzezie	
15	Władysław	Mackiewicz	1924	20	Sprejnie (Spreiniai)	
16	Helena	Matalaniec	1941	3	Glinciszki	
17	Maria	Matalaniec	1922	22	Glinciszki	
18	Antoni	Mieżaniec	1927	17	Sprejnie	
19	Jadwiga	Nowicka	1920	24	Podbrzezie	
20	Władysława	Nowicka	1939	5	Podbrzezie	
21		Romejko				
22	Mieczysław	Sobolewski	1922	22	Podbrzezie	
23	Apolonia	Stankiewicz	1881	63	Glinciszki	
24	Michał	Stankiewicz	1878	66	Glinciszki	
25	Maria	Szalkowska	1923	21	Glinciszki	
26	Wacław	Szalkowski	1920	24	Glinciszki	
27	Aleksander	Szewiel	1932	12	Glinciszki	
28	Felicja	Szewiel	1901	43	Glinciszki	
29	Marian	Szewiel	1934	10	Glinciszki	
30	Karol	Szymaniecki	c. 1880	c. 64	Glinciszki	
31	Konstancja	Wenclewska			Glinciszki	
32	Feliks	Wenclewski			Glinciszki	
33	Konstanty	Wenclewski	1936	8	Glinciszki	
34	Joanna	Wiszkiel	1866	78	Glinciszki	
35	Longin	Zienkiewicz	1909	35	Burkiła (Burkila)	
36	Józef	Żytliński	1928	16	Skierdzima (Skerdimai)	
37	N.N. man					
38	N.N. man					
39	N.N. man					

== Bibliography ==
- Rokicki, Paweł (2015). Glinciszki i Dubinki. Zbrodnie wojenne na Wileńszczyźnie w połowie 1944 roku i ich konsekwencje we współczesnych relacjach polsko-litewskich [Glinciszki and Dubinki. War crimes in the Vilnius Region in mid-1944 and their consequences in contemporary Polish-Lithuanian relations] (PDF). Monografie (in Polish). Warsaw: Institute of National Remembrance. ISBN 978-83-8229-224-4. Archived (PDF) from the original on 2022-10-15.
- Bubnys, Arūnas (2015). Pasipriešinimo judėjimas Lietuvoje Antrojo pasaulinio karo metais: lenkų pogrindis 1939-1945 m. (in Lithuanian). ISBN 9789955847960.
