= Žemaitėliai =

- Village
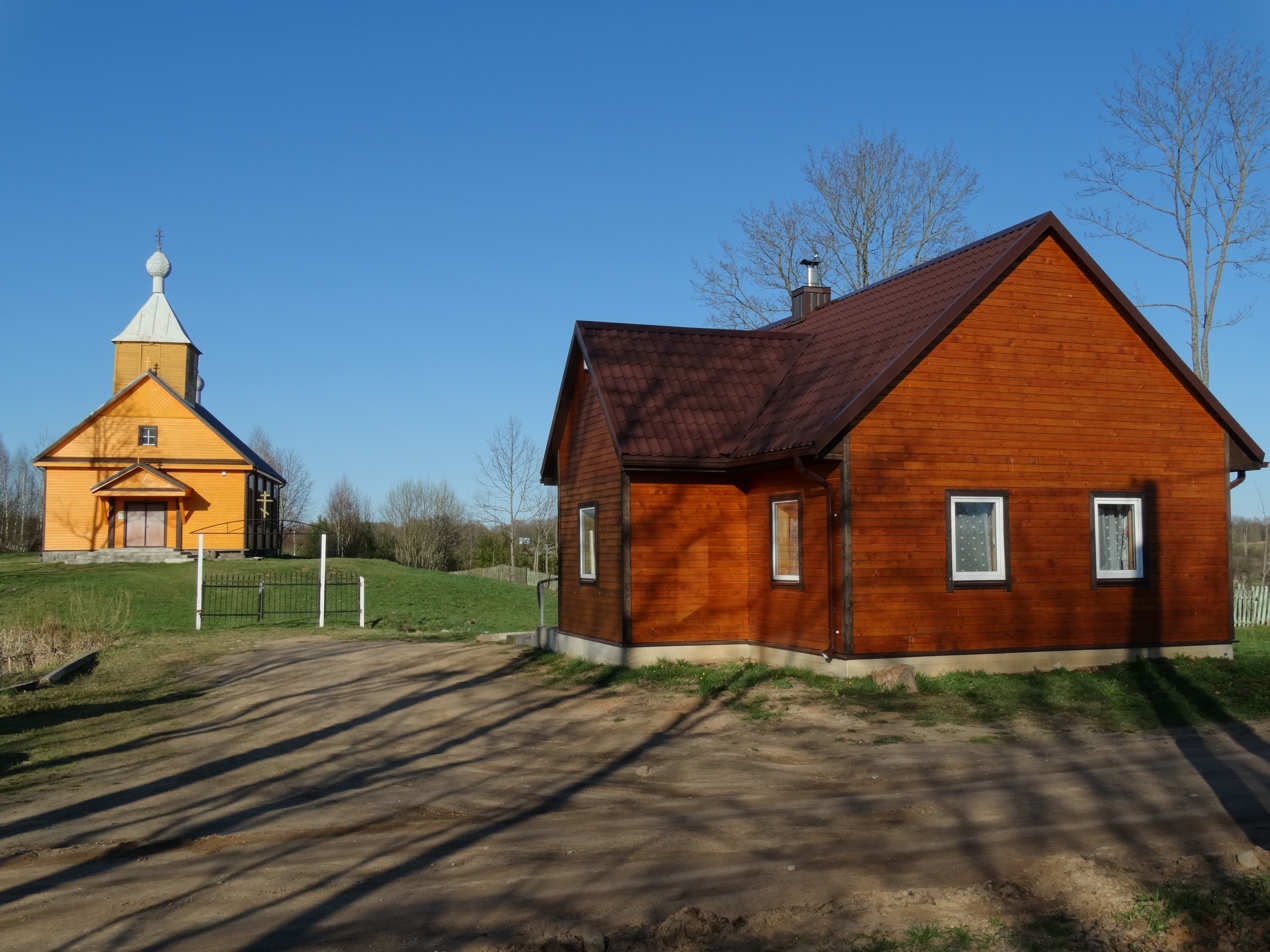
- Old Believers church in Žemaitėliai

- Location of Žemaitėliai
- Coordinates: 54°57′40″N 25°20′28″E
- Country: Lithuania
- County: Vilnius County
- Municipality: Vilnius District Municipality
- Eldership: Paberžė eldership
- First mention: 1876

Population (2011)
  - Total: 21
- Time zone: UTC+2 (EET)
  - Summer (DST): UTC+3 (EEST)

Žemaitėliai (formerly known as Russian: Митрофановка; Russian: Жемайтеляй) is a village in Vilnius District Municipality, Lithuania inhabited by Russians Old Believers. According to the 2011 census, it had population of 21.

== History ==
Žemaitėliai village (known as Mitrophanovka then) with a community of Old Believers was established not later than 1876. A church was built in 1928, a cemetery and a library (with 285 books in 1936) established. Local Old Believers were mostly wealthy farmers (owners of 18–25 ha plots of land), masons, joiners, freelance workers. The community was hit by World War II and Soviet rule, when men were taken to the Red Army and some families deported to Siberia. In 1950, there were 45 families of Old Believers, but because of strong USSR anti-religious campaigns and propaganda of atheism as well as urbanization, the community shrank to only 10 families in 1997. After 1990, local church was restored. During the holidays, Old Believers from nearby Paberžė, Anavilis, Purnuškės, Akmena, Visalaukė villages gather in Žemaitėliai. A community house was built in 2014. There is an Old Believers church in Akmena village, located some 10 kilometres (6.2 mi) from Žemaitėliai.
