= Anavilis =

- Village
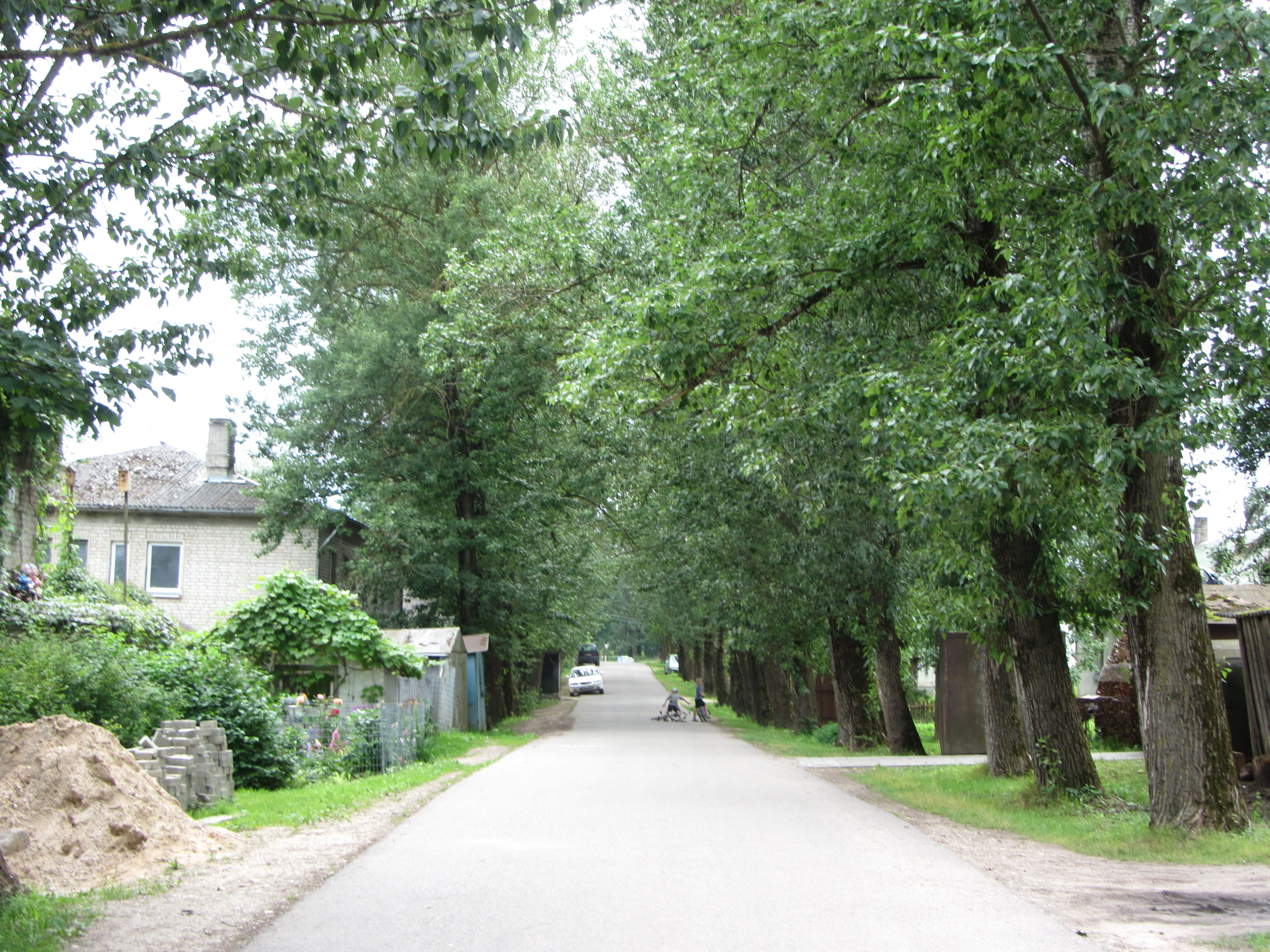
- A street in Anavilis

- Location of Anavilis
- Coordinates: 54°56′31″N 25°13′41″E
- Country: Lithuania
- County: Vilnius County
- Municipality: Vilnius district municipality
- Eldership: Paberžė eldership
- Capital of: Paberžė eldership

Population (2011)
  - Total: 574
- Time zone: UTC+2 (EET)
  - Summer (DST): UTC+3 (EEST)

Anavilis is a village in Vilnius district municipality, Lithuania. According to the 2011 census, it had population of 574. Anavilis is situated just outside Paberžė and together those two settlements function as (technically) one urban entity.
