= Glitiškės =

- Village
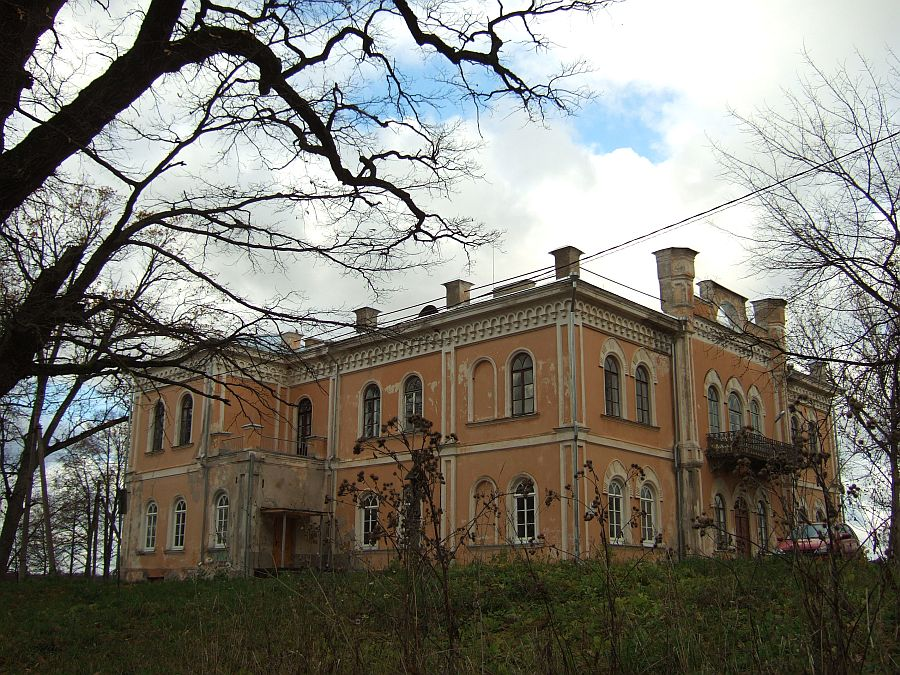
- Glitiškės Manor

- Location of Glitiškės
- Coordinates: 54°59′10″N 25°13′30″E
- Country: Lithuania
- County: Vilnius County
- Municipality: Vilnius district municipality
- Eldership: Paberžė eldership

Population (2011)
  - Total: 549
- Time zone: UTC+2 (EET)
  - Summer (DST): UTC+3 (EEST)

Glitiškės (Polish: Glinciszki) is a village in Vilnius district, Lithuania situated on the eastern bank of Širvys Lake. In the 2011 census, it had 549 residents. The village was the site of the massacre of several dozen Polish villagers by German collaborators in 1944.

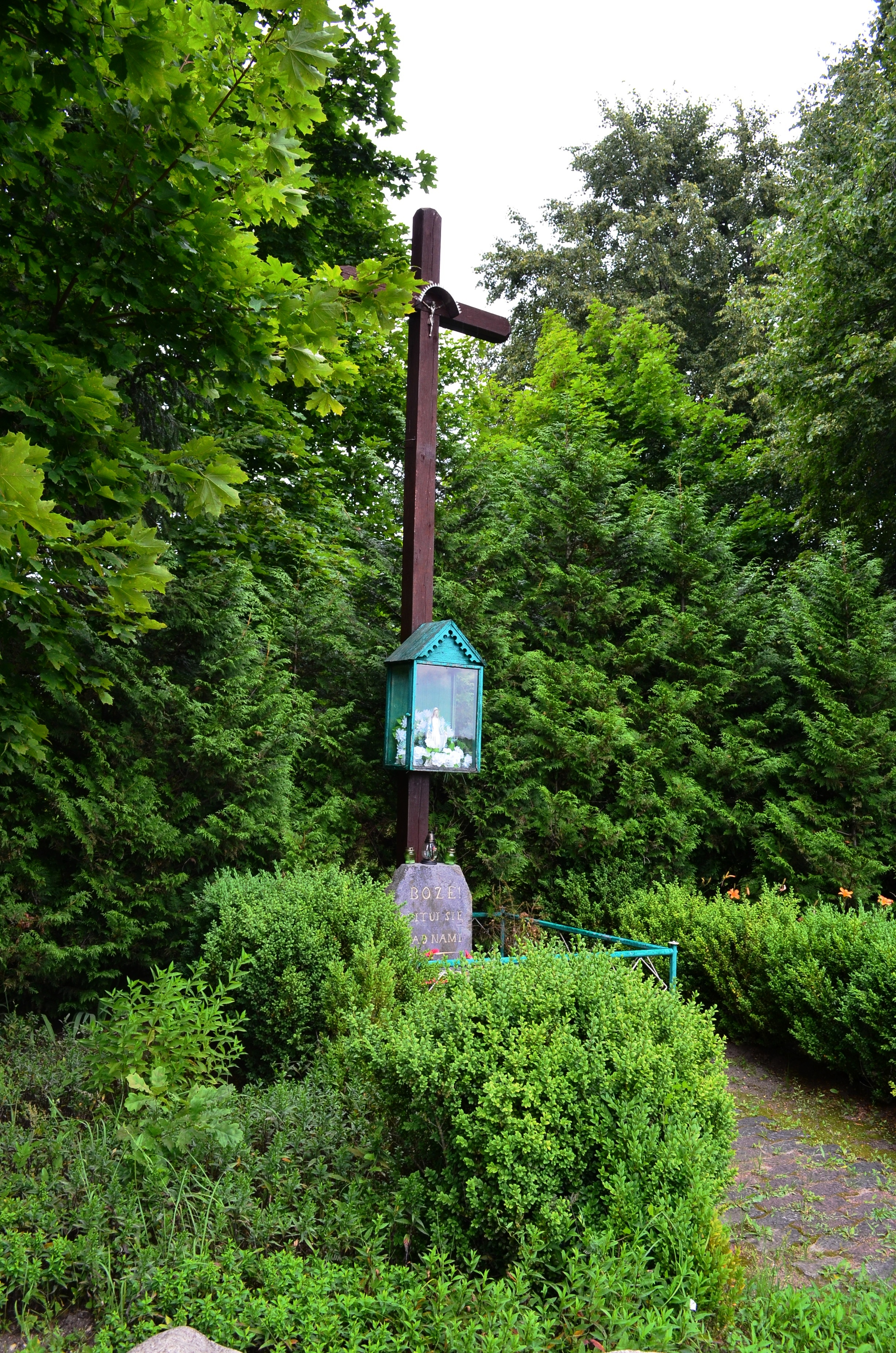
Cross at the sight of the massacre in Glitiškės
