= Petras Polekauskas =

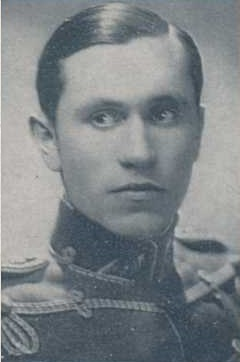
- Petras Polekauskas in his hussar uniform, c. 1933–1940
- Born: 19 April or 9 May 1909; Marijampolė or Vilkaviškis, Suwałki Governorate, Russian Empire
- Died: 12 April 1965 (aged 55) Hartford, Connecticut, United States
- Cause of death: Suicide by jumping
- Known for: Glinciszki massacre
- Spouse: Alena Levytė-Polekauskienė

Petras Polekauskas (19 April or 9 May 1909 – 12 April 1965) was a Lithuanian officer of the Lithuanian Army, the Red Army's 29th Rifle Corps and then the Lithuanian Auxiliary Police Battalions formed by Nazi Germany. He is notable for ordering the Glinciszki massacre of 39 Polish civilians in June 1944. Initially in the post-war, Polekauskas was a refugee in West Germany due to the Soviet re-occupation of Lithuania in 1944–1945. In the 1950s, he emigrated to the United States, where he settled down, created a family and owned a local business in Hartford, Connecticut. Polekauskas killed himself in 1965.

== Early life and career ==
Polekauskas was born in 1909, either on April 19 or May 9. His obituary states that he was born in Marijampolė, although another source gives his birthplace as Vilkaviškis. He studied at the Ukmergė Gymnasium and Kaunas Jesuit Gymnasium. On 27 August 1931, Polekauskas graduated from the Marijampolė Gymnasium.

On 15 September 1933, Polekauskas graduated from the cavalry section of the 15th class of the War School of Kaunas. He served in the 1st Hussar Regiment until 1940. Polekauskas held the rank of sub-lieutenant. He was promoted to lieutenant on 31 December 1936. On 28 September 1937, he joined Vytautas Magnus University's law faculty.

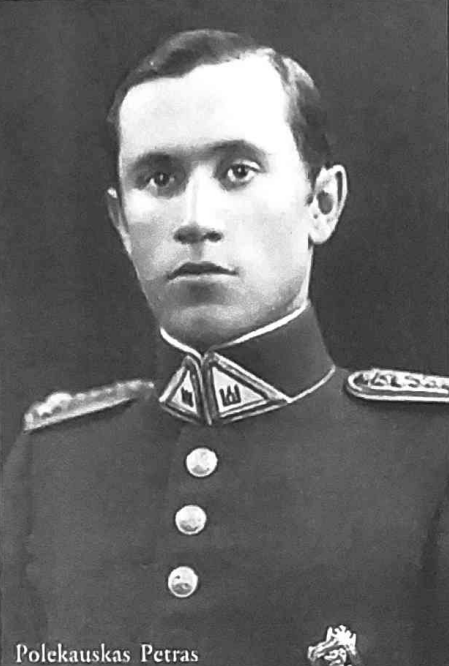
Petras Polekauskas in an infantry uniform with the graduation insignia of the War School of Kaunas at bottom right, c. 1941–1944

== World War II ==
On 16 May 1940, Polekauskas was moved to the 2nd Uhlan Regiment and was made commander of the 3rd squadron. When the Soviet Union occupied Lithuania and liquidated its army, Polekauskas was made the commander of the anti-aircraft battery of the Red Army's 29th Territorial Rifle Corps' 26th Cavalry Regiment. When the German invasion of the Soviet Union started on 22 June 1941, Polekauskas left the Red Army.

During the German occupation of Lithuania during World War II, Polekauskas served in the Lithuanian Auxiliary Police Battalions. During 16-25 July 1941, Polekauskas served in the Vilnius garrison's 2nd Defence Regiment. From August 1941, he commanded one of the three companies of the 15th "Gardinas" Lithuanian Auxiliary Police Battalion. With his company, he was sent all over Byelorussia and north-eastern Lithuania. From May 1942, Petras Polekauskas was the adjutant of the 254th Lithuanian Auxiliary Police Battalion's commander. In early 1944, based on the unit's surviving orders, Petras Polekauskas was the commander of the Assembly Company (Lithuanian: Rinkimosi kuopa) of the 258th Battalion. On 20 June 1944, Petras Polekauskas ordered 50 soldiers, roughly half of 3rd Company of the 258th Lithuanian Auxiliary Police Battalion, to commit the Glitiškės massacre.

When a second Soviet occupation of Lithuania seemed imminent, Petras Polekauskas fled to Germany in 1944.

== Post-war ==
Polekauskas remained in West Germany until 1951, sharing the fate of tens of thousands of refugees from Lithuania. From there, he emigrated to the USA. On 18 February 1951, Polekauskas set sail from the port of Bremerhaven onboard the USNS General Harry Taylor, among a crowd of similar emigrants from Central and Eastern Europe. He arrived in New York on March 3 and settled permanently in Hartford, Connecticut. Polekauskas struggled to settle down in US. He was granted American citizenship on 10 April 1959. In Hartford, Polekauskas met his wife, Alena Levytė-Polekauskienė, also from Lithuania, and started a family. Together, they bought a coffeehouse-cafeteria in 1960 and lived rather well.

Polekauskas was active in Hartford's Lithuanian community, belonged to the local Lithuanian Roman Catholic parish and the local section of the Lithuanian War Veterans' Association (Lithuanian: Lietuvių karių veteranų sąjunga, abbreviated as LKVS) "Ramovė".

== Death ==
Polekauskas killed himself on 12 April 1965 in Middletown, Connecticut. Two men said they saw him jump off the Arrigoni Bridge into the Connecticut River. His body was found in the water several days later. In Polekauskas's obituary, he was described as "pleasant and accommodating" and that he was nostalgically longing for his native land.

== Family life ==
His wife was Alena Levytė-Polekauskienė, whom he met in Hartford. He also had a sister, Marija Stalauskienė, who remained in Lithuania.

== Bibliography ==
- Bubnys, Arūnas (2017). Lietuvių policijos batalionai 1941-1945 m. (in Lithuanian). Vilnius: Lietuvos gyventojų genocido ir rezistencijos tyrimo centras. ISBN 978-609-8037-68-5.
- vn. (June 1965). "Kronika" (PDF). Karys (in Lithuanian). 1413 (6): 191.
- Žalienė, Dalia (2006). Lietuvos kariuomenės karininkai (1918-1953) (in Lithuanian). Vol. VI. Vilnius: National Museum of Lithuania. p. 146. ISBN 978-9955-415-67-1.
