= 258th Lithuanian Police Battalion =

- Lithuanian: 258-asis lietuvių policijos batalionas
- Active: April 27–July 1944
- Country: German-occupied Lithuania
- Allegiance: Nazi Germany
- Branch: Ordnungspolizei
- Type: Infantry
- Size: ~250 (May 1944)

258th Lithuanian Police Battalion (German: Litauische Polizei-Ersatz-Bataillon Nr. 258, lit. '258th Lithuanian Police Ersatz Battalion'; Lithuanian: 258-asis lietuvių policijos batalionas) was a Lithuanian auxiliary police battalion formed on 27 April 1944. The unit was disbanded in Tilsit at the end of July that same year.

== Formation ==
The battalion was formed on April 27 by Order of the Day No.5, issued by the Ordnungspolizei leader under the SS- und Polizeiführer in Lithuania. This order created and formed the 258th Lithuanian Police battalion from the training units (Mokymo dalis) of the LAD.

== History ==
This unit, or at least its headquarters, were deployed in Kaunas from April to mid-June, judging from the orders issued to the Training Units and the 258th Battalion. According to other sources, the battalion was in Prienai in May 1944. Two other battalions were deployed at Prienai barracks: one German, the other Lithuanian. The 258th battalion included about 250 soldiers, whose uniform was blue Wehrmacht infantry uniforms.

=== April ===
On 1 April 1944, captain Albinas Lastauskas, the commander of the young soldiers' company, together with 21 other soldiers, was sent to the 259th Lithuanian Police Battalion, that was forming in Prienai. Lastauskas' position was taken over by non-commissioned officer Jurgis Normantas. The young soldiers' company, in terms of training supervision, was under the training company's commander. The training company's lieutenant Nikodemas Reikalas was given special holidays for May 28-June 9.

The 258th Battalion included one construction and one assembly company. The assembly company was commanded by lieutenant Petras Polekauskas. On April 1, the assembly company received lieutenant Jonas Paliulionis, 55 NCOs and soldiers from the 8th Battalion. On May 31, lieutenant Vytautas Andriuškevičius, also from the 8th Battalion, was also sent to the assembly company. On April 4, by the order of captain Antanas Ruzgys, commander of the Training Unit, 245 soldiers of the construction company were sent to the 259th Battalion.

On April 26, the Commander of the SiPo and SD ordered the arrests of Valerijonas Janulis, the 258th Battalion's staff junior non-commissioned officer, and private Antanas Plečkaitis. They were to be given over to the Gestapo.

=== May ===
On May 23, captain Viktoras Jarašiūnas from the 2nd Battalion, was appointed to serve in the battalion headquarters. Four days later, on May 27, captain Vladas Patašius from the 253th Battalion was temporarily appointed the Battalion commander's adjutant. For unknown reasons, the assembly company's private Antanas Strimaitis was arrested by the German police and imprisoned in the Kaunas Hard Labour Prison. On May 29, the privates Kazys Urbonas, Albertas Katilevičius, Kazys Paškevičius and Edvardas Lileika left the battalion.

=== June ===
At the beginning of June, the 258th Battalion was moved to Kaunas, where the soldiers guarded the military warehouses. At summer's beginning, one platoon from the battalion served at the 11th resistance point, which guarded the railway section near Kazlų Rūda, the railway station and the railway bridge. There were 16 soldiers armed with 1 light machine gun, 1 light mortar and rifles at this point of resistance.

As the Red Army occupied more and more of Lithuania, the battalion retreated to Tilsit. At the end of July, the 258th Battalion was disbanded in Tilsit.

== Aftermath ==
From Tilsit, the battalion's remnants were moved to the town of Zingst near the Belgium–Germany border to build fortifications there. Three weeks later, Lithuanian soldiers were sent to build new power lines at the Swiss border. The battalion's former soldiers were captured by the United States Army in early May 1945.

Some of the battalion's soldiers were transferred to other military units, while other were sent to a special camp on the Rügen island, where Lithuanians, Latvians, Estonians, Russians and Ukrainians were being taught military and intelligence subjects.

== Bibliography ==
- Breslavskienė, Laimutė (September 2010). "Pažyma apie 258-ojo lietuvių policijos bataliono fondą Nr. R-669" [CENTRAL STATE ARCHIVES OF LITHUANIA CERTIFICATE ABOUT THE 258TH LITHUANIAN POLICE] (in Lithuanian). Lietuvos centrinis valstybės archyvas. Archived from the original on 2015-04-19.
- Bubnys, Arūnas (17 October 2009). "Lietuvių policijos batalionų nuginklavimas ir išformavimas Rytprūsiuose 1944 metais" ["Disarming and disbanding Lithuanian police battalions in East Prussia in 1944"] (PDF). Voruta (in Lithuanian). 20 (686). ISSN 1392-0677.
- Bubnys, Arūnas (2017). Lietuvių policijos batalionai 1941-1945 m. [Lithuanian police battalions 1941-1945] (in Lithuanian). Vilnius: Lietuvos gyventojų genocido ir rezistencijos tyrimo centras. ISBN 978-609-8037-68-5.
