= Glitiškės Manor =

Coordinates: 54°59′07″N 25°13′19″E

- Glitiškių dvaras
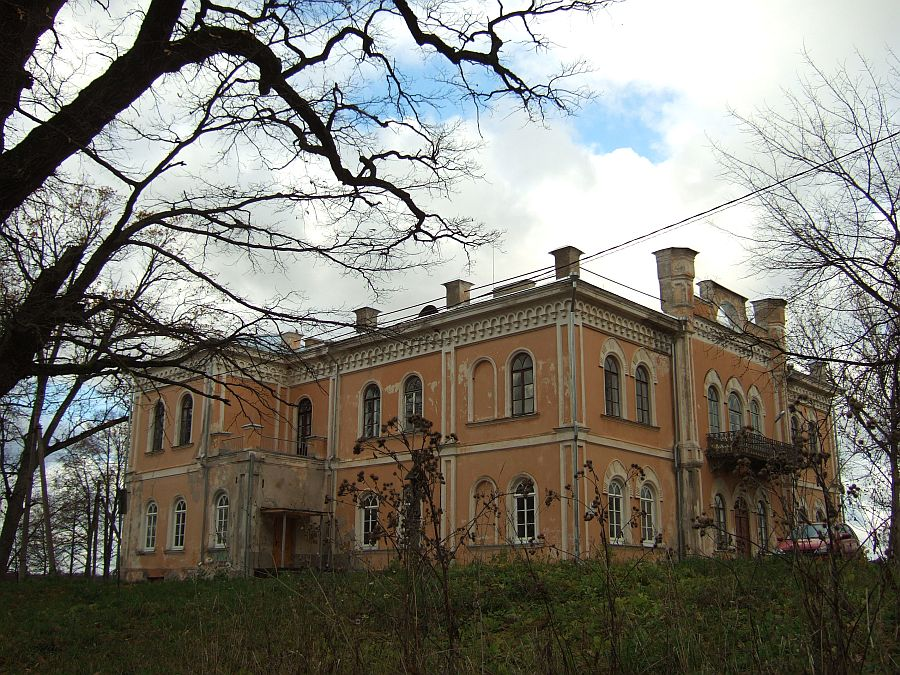
- Glitiškės Manor in 2007

General information
- Location: Glitiškės, Paberžė Eldership, Vilnius District Municipality, Vilnius County
- Country: Lithuania
- Year(s) built: 1483

Glitiškės Manor is a former residential manor in Glitiškės village, Vilnius District Municipality, Lithuania.
