= Paberžė =

Paberžė Podbrzezie
- Village
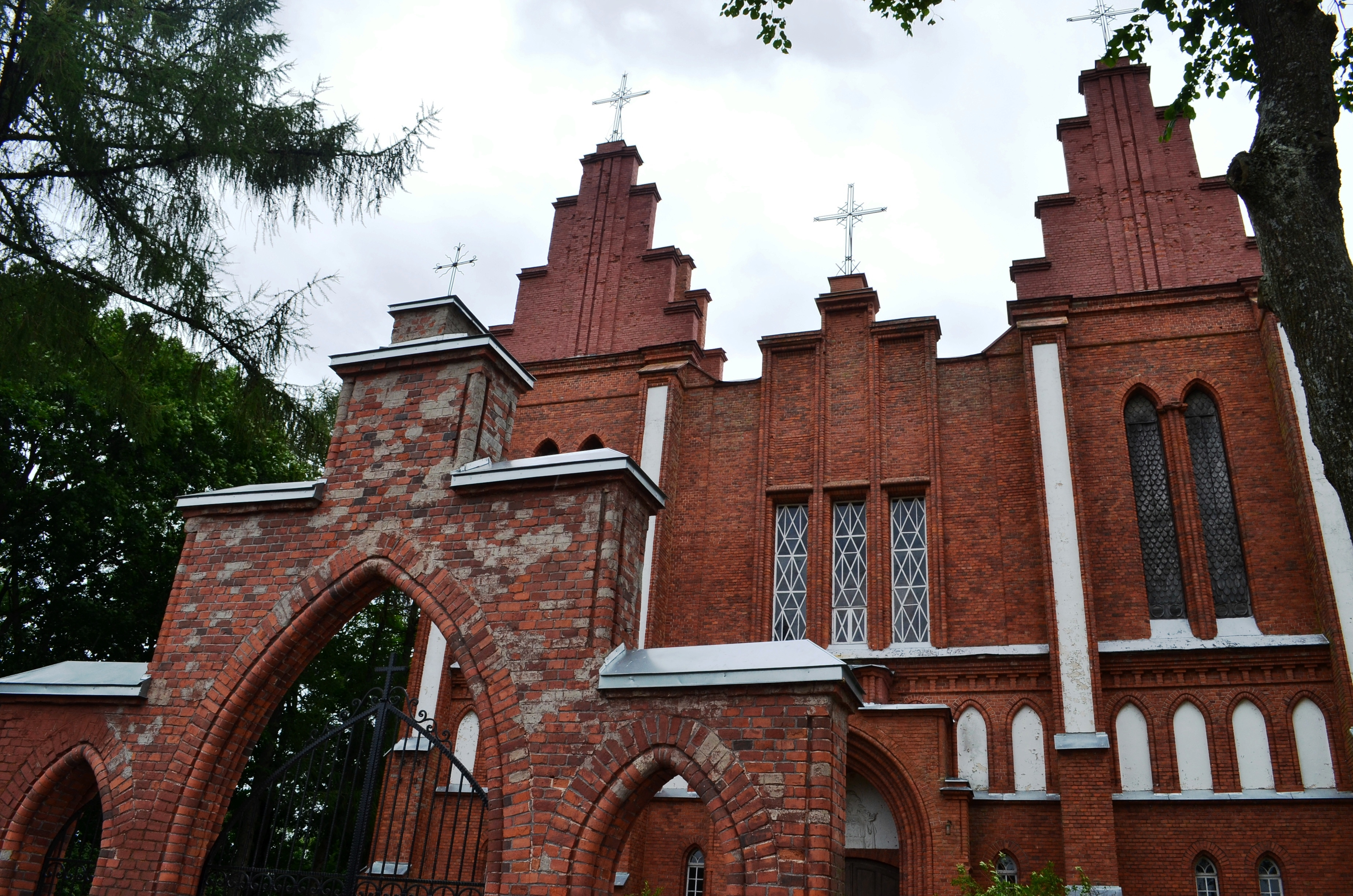
- Church of Paberžė

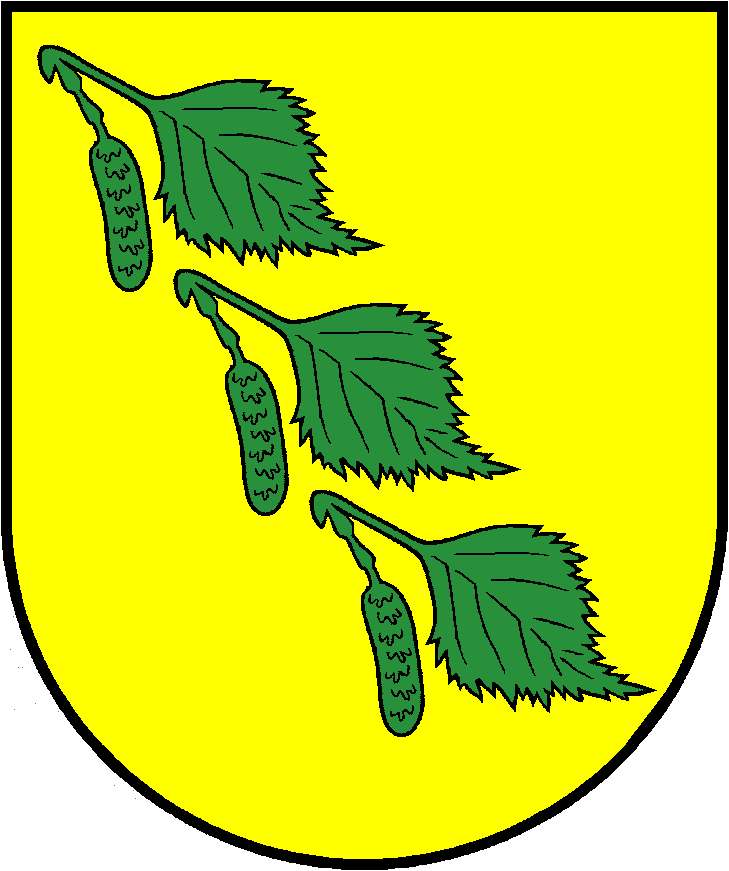
- Coat of arms

- Location of Paberžė
- Coordinates: 54°56′49″N 25°14′20″E
- Country: Lithuania
- County: Vilnius County
- Municipality: Vilnius District Municipality
- Eldership: Paberžė eldership
- Capital of: Paberžė eldership
- First mention: 1484

Population (2021)
  - Total: 453
- Time zone: UTC+2 (EET)
  - Summer (DST): UTC+3 (EEST)

Paberžė (Lithuanian for near the birch (forest)) is a village in Vilnius District Municipality, Lithuania, it is located only about 21 kilometres (13 mi) north of Vilnius city municipality. According to the 2011 census, it had population of 919.

== History ==
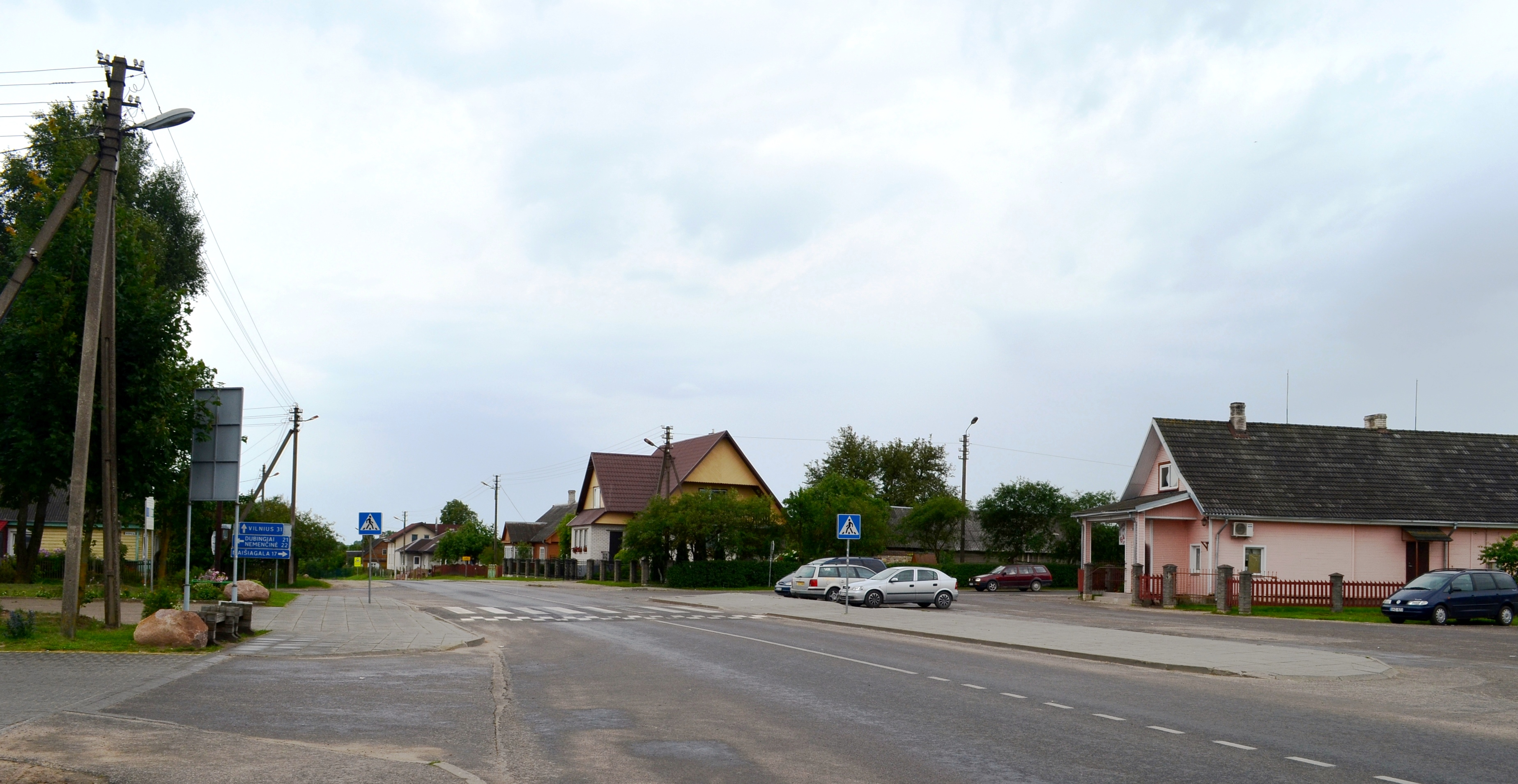
Central part of Paberžė village

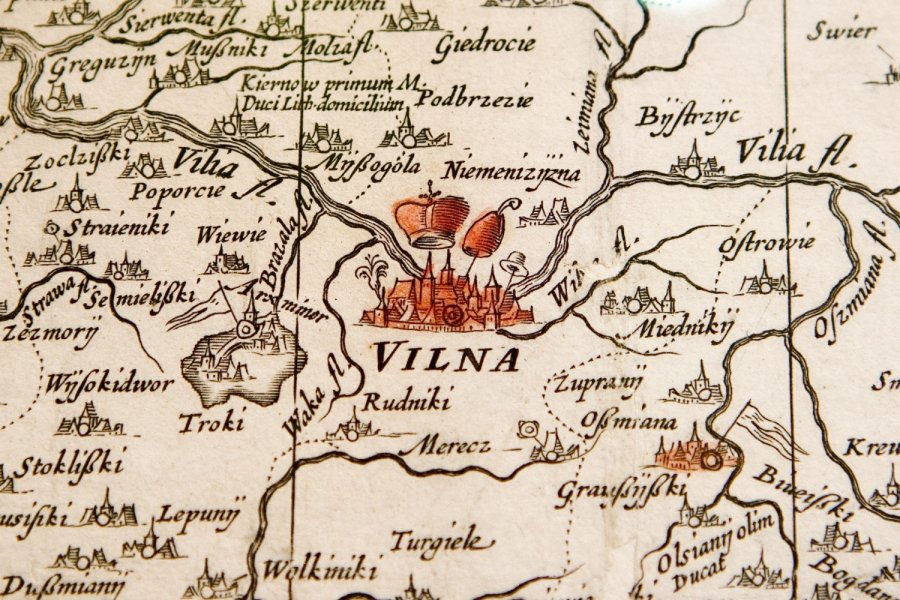
Fragment of a map of the Grand Duchy of Lithuania (1613) and Paberžė (Podbrzezie), shown just north of Vilnius (Vilna).

The territory of Paberžė was inhabited from the early Middle Ages. In the vicinity of the village, there are archaeological sites Pilata and Pilaškučiai. Paberžė itself is an old settlement, first mentioned in historical records in 1484 when the first church was built. In 1503, Paberžė parish was established. In 1517, Grand Duke Sigismund I the Old granted the privilege of establishing a tavern in Paberžė, profit of this establishment was used to support the local church.

In the 16th century, the village was known as Beržai (Lithuanian for birch trees). In 1613, the village was marked on a famous map of the Grand Duchy of Lithuania — Magni Ducatus Lithuaniae, et Regionum Adiacentium exacta Descriptio printed in Amsterdam and financed by the Lithuanian magnate Mikołaj Krzysztof "the Orphan" Radziwiłł. In the second half of the 17th century, Catholic monks lived in Paberžė, there was a Catholic church and a parish school. In 1676, a new wooden church was built, which was renewed in 1759 and rebuilt in 1793. In 1860, the wooden Catholic church was rebuilt again. In 1866, after the January Uprising, it was transferred to the Eastern Orthodox Church. A local Catholic priest converted to Eastern Orthodoxy and encouraged his parishioners to do the same.

Before World War I, the village was famous for its rodeo with bulls (the only such place in Lithuania). During the interwar period, Neo-Gothic church with well visible modernist features was built (finished in 1932).

In 2013, coat of arms of Paberžė were created with the birch tree leaves depicted.

== Demography ==
Historical population
| Year | Pop. | ±% |
|---|---|---|
| 1897 | 688 | — |
| 1959 | 452 | −34.3% |
| 1970 | 854 | +88.9% |
| 1979 | 983 | +15.1% |
| 1989 | 1,162 | +18.2% |
| 2001 | 986 | −15.1% |
| 2011 | 919 | −6.8% |
| 2021 | 453 | −50.7% |

According to the census of 2011, there were 919 inhabitants in Paberžė village and 3,670 in Paberžė eldership, which covers an area of 209 square kilometres (81 sq mi) and includes 127 villages. The ethnographic composition of the eldership is very diverse: Lithuanians – 20,4%, Poles – 60,6%, Russians – 13,2% and others – 5,8%. Religious composition is as diverse: Catholics, Old Believers and Eastern Orthodox. According to the census of 2021, the composition was the following: out of 3175 inhabitants, 1882 or 59,2% were Poles, 748 or 23,6% were Lithuanians, 363 or 11,4% were Russians, 90 or 2,8% were Belarusians, 10 Ukrainians and 84 of other ethnicity or refused to answer.
