= Vaigeliškės =

- village
- Location of Vaigeliškės
- Coordinates: 54°48′00″N 25°00′00″E
- Country: Lithuania
- County: Vilnius County
- Municipality: Vilnius district municipality
- Eldership: Sudervė eldership

Population (2011)
  - Total: 37
- Time zone: UTC+2 (EET)
  - Summer (DST): UTC+3 (EEST)

Vaigeliškės (Polish: Wojgieliszki) is a village in Vilnius district municipality, Lithuania. It is located about 23 km (14 mi) northwest of Vilnius. According to the 2011 census, it had population of 37.
