= Vilnius municipality =

Vilnius municipality may refer to:

- Vilnius city municipality
- Vilnius district municipality
