= Lenino keliu =

Defunct Lithuanian newspaper (1949-1950)

- Owner(s): Vilnius District Committee of the Communist Party (Bolshevik) of Lithuania and the Vilnius District Executive Committee
- Founded: 2 October 1949
- Ceased publication: 30 August 1950
- Political alignment: Communism
- Language: Lithuanian language
- City: Vilnius
- Country: Soviet Union

Lenino keliu (transl. On the Path of Lenin) was a newspaper published from Vilnius, Soviet Union between 2 October 1949 and 30 August 1950. It was an organ of the Vilnius District Committee of the Communist Party (Bolshevik) of Lithuania and the Vilnius District Executive Committee. 38 issues were published in 1949, while 103 issues were published in 1950.
