= Mostiškės =

- Village
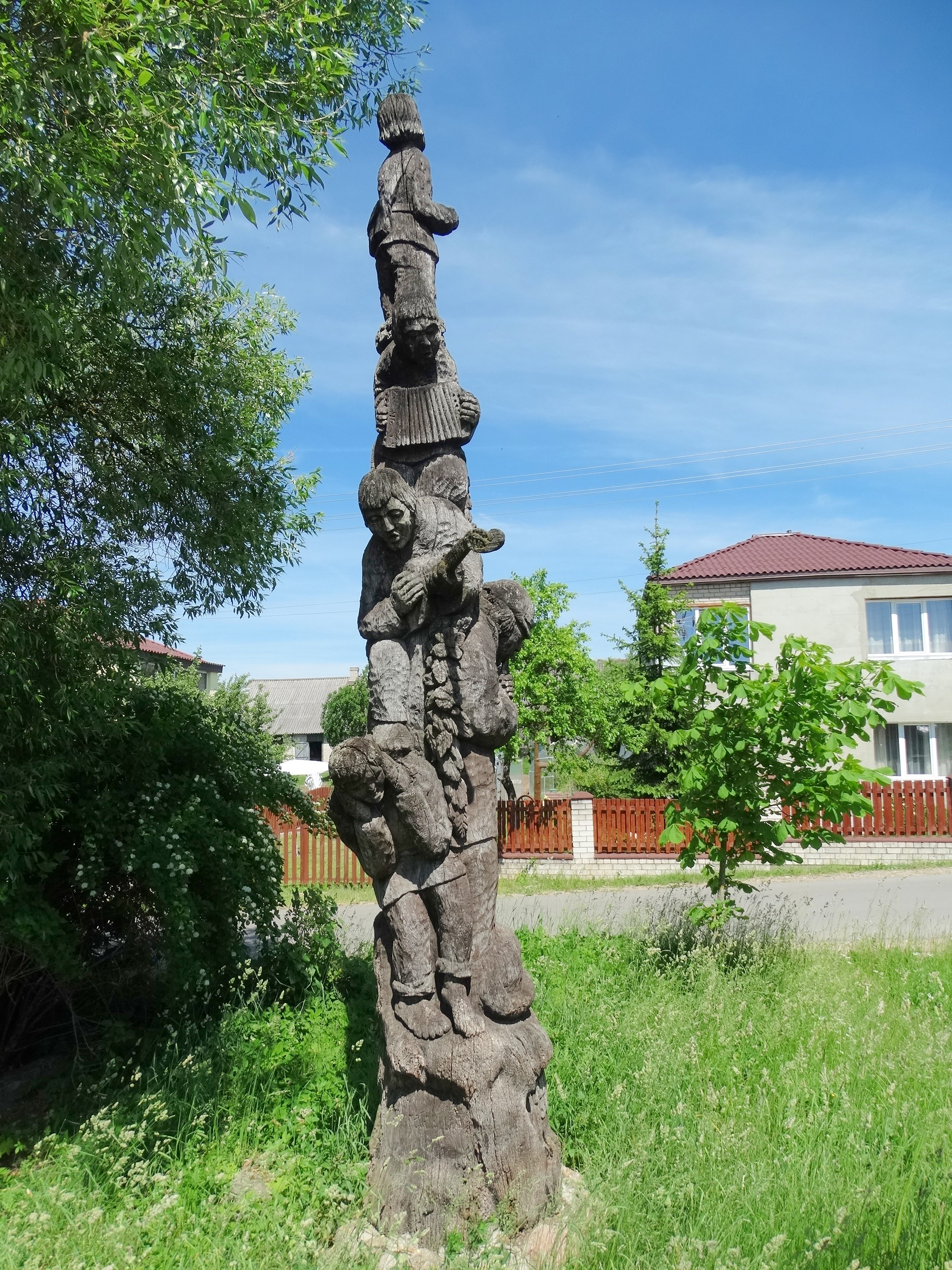
- Houses of Mostiškės and wooden sculpture

- Location of Mostiškės
- Coordinates: 54°46′19″N 25°40′01″E
- Country: Lithuania
- County: Vilnius County
- Municipality: Vilnius District Municipality
- Eldership: Lavoriškės eldership

Population (2011)
  - Total: 631
- Time zone: UTC+2 (EET)
  - Summer (DST): UTC+3 (EEST)

Mostiškės is a village in Vilnius District Municipality, Lithuania. According to the 2011 census, it had population of 631.
