= Grigaičiai =

- Village
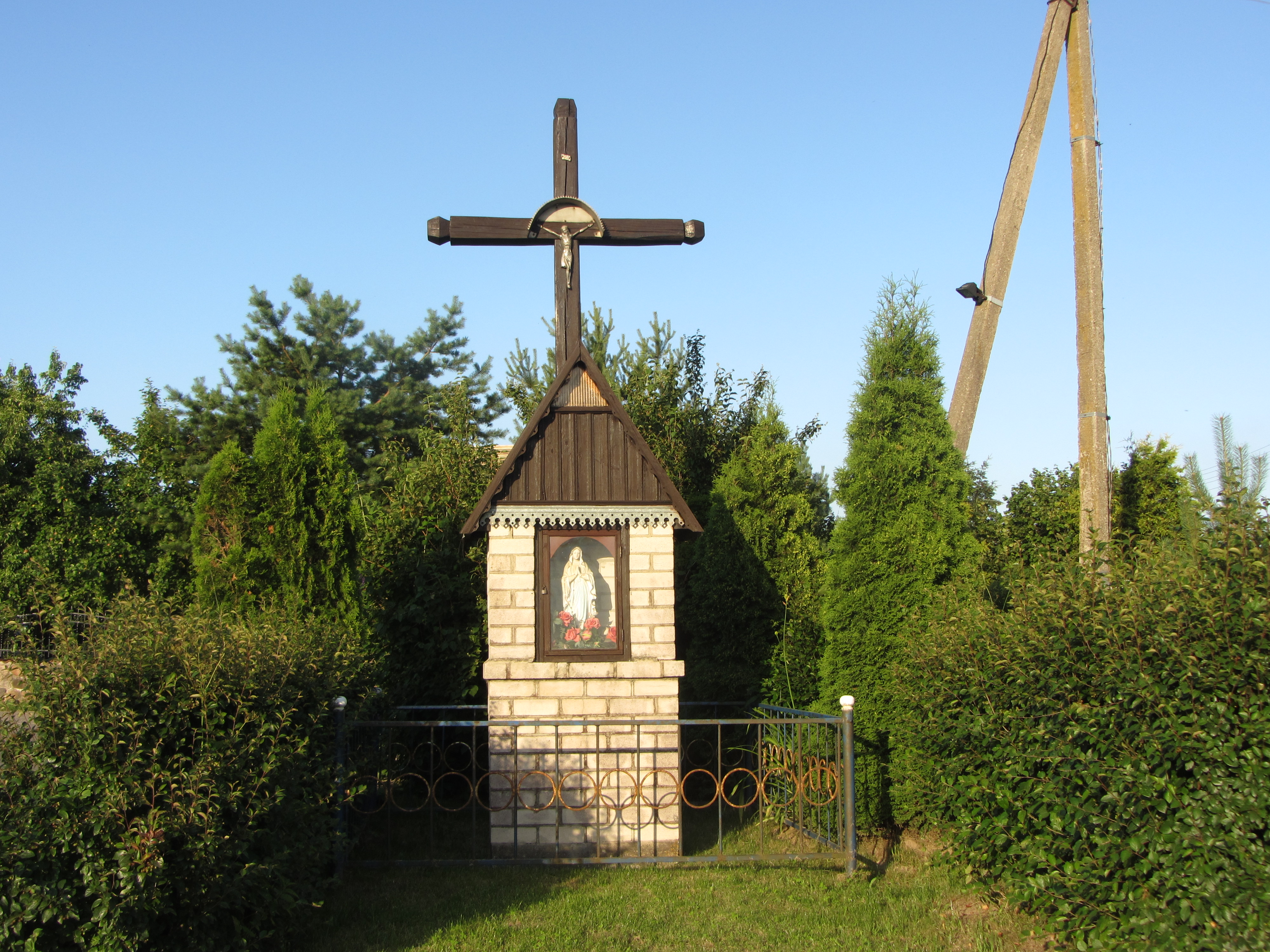
- Catholic tower chapel in Grigaičiai

- Location of Grigaičiai
- Coordinates: 54°40′08″N 25°25′08″E
- Country: Lithuania
- County: Vilnius County
- Municipality: Vilnius District Municipality
- Eldership: Šatrininkai Eldership

Population (2011)
  - Total: 1,325
- Time zone: UTC+2 (EET)
  - Summer (DST): UTC+3 (EEST)

Grigaičiai is a village in Vilnius District Municipality, Lithuania, just south of Naujoji Vilnia. According to the 2011 census, it had population of 1,325.
