= Rastinėnai =

- Village
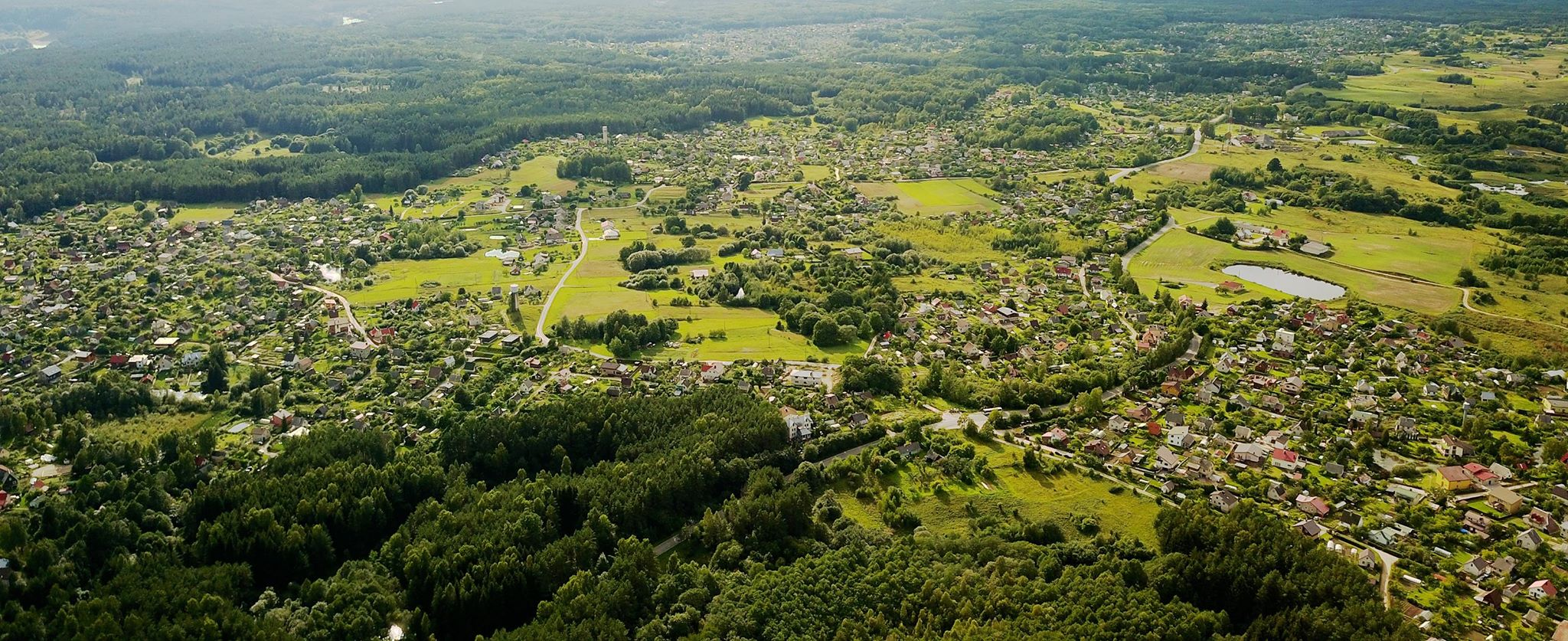
- Rastinėnai village as seen from a plane.

- Location of Rastinėnai
- Coordinates: 54°45′50″N 25°02′38″E
- Country: Lithuania
- County: Vilnius County
- Municipality: Vilnius district municipality
- Eldership: Sudervė eldership

Population (2011)
  - Total: 556
- Time zone: UTC+2 (EET)
  - Summer (DST): UTC+3 (EEST)

Rastinėnai is a village in Vilnius district municipality, Lithuania, a suburb of Vilnius. Formerly famous as collective gardening settlement during Lithuanian SSR times, after privatization and transformation into the suburban settlement, it had population of 556 as according to the 2011 census, up from 95 in 1970 and 321 in 2001.
