= Didžiosios Kabiškės =

- Village
- Location of Didžiosios Kabiškės
- Coordinates: 54°52′20″N 25°27′10″E
- Country: Lithuania
- Ethnographic region: Aukštaitija
- County: Vilnius County
- Municipality: Vilnius district municipality
- Eldership: Nemenčinė eldership

Population (2011)
  - Total: 716
- Time zone: UTC+2 (EET)
  - Summer (DST): UTC+3 (EEST)

Didžiosios Kabiškės (literally: Great Kabiškės) is a village in Vilnius district municipality, Lithuania. It is located about 24 km (15 mi) northeast of Vilnius, capital of Lithuania. The nearest city is Nemenčinė. A smaller village, known as Mažosios Kabiškės (literally: Little Kabiškės), is located nearby. Didžiosios Kabiškės has a bi-lingual Lithuanian and Polish kindergarten and a primary school (reorganized into one institution in May 2009), a postal office, and a library.

The village was chosen as the center for Zhdanov's kolkhoz (collective farm). It was built between 1975 and 1980 by "Neris", one of the biggest farming complexes in the Lithuanian Soviet Socialist Republic. The complex exchanged stock-raising technologies with Frankfurt am Main, Germany. These developments spurred village's growth: it had 51 residents in 1959, 84 in 1970, 360 in 1979, 488 in 1985. In 1990 Lithuania declared independence and state's support for the kolkhoz discontinued. According to the census in 2011, it had 716 residents.
