= Galgiai =

- Village
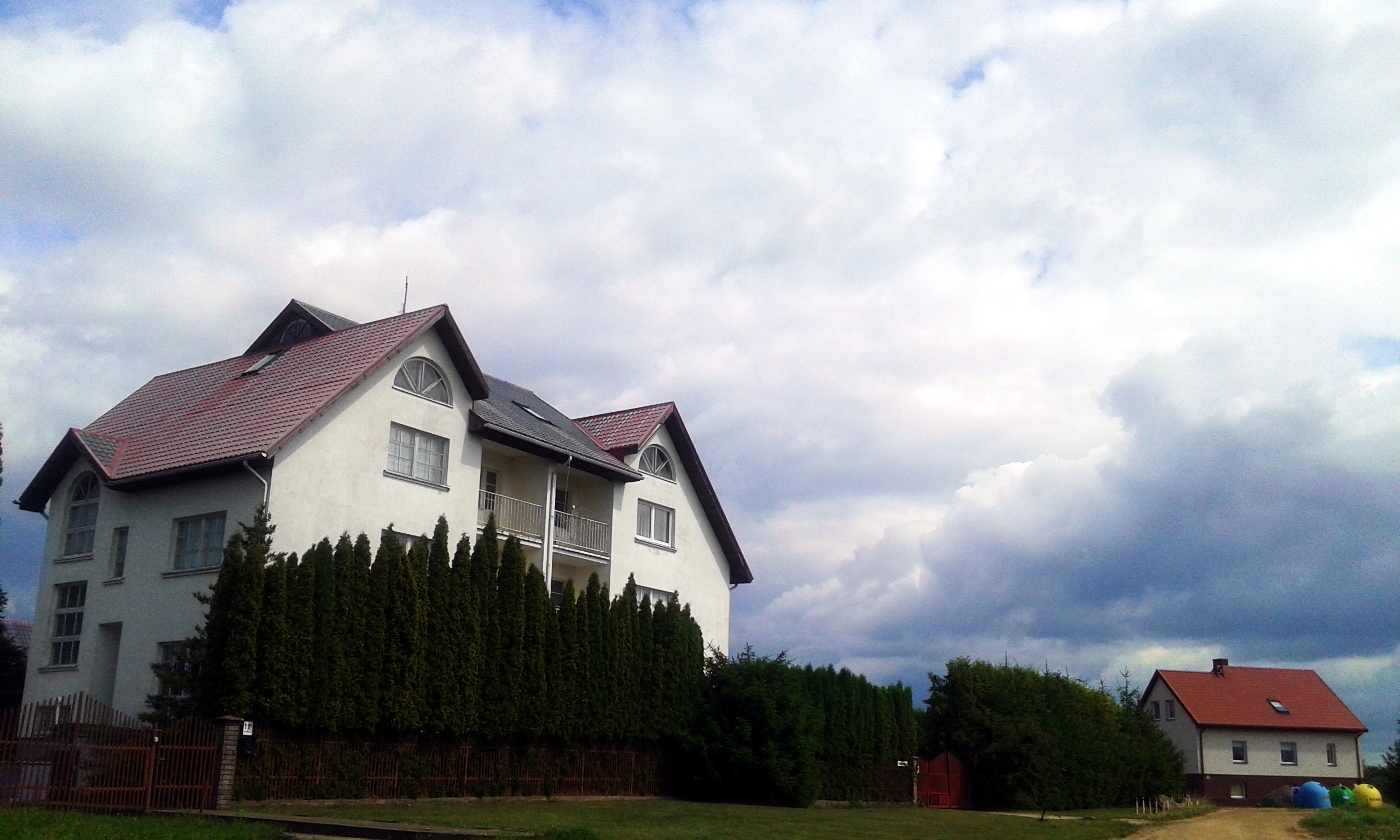
- Residential houses in Galgiai.

- Location of Galgiai
- Coordinates: 54°43′08″N 25°25′01″E
- Country: Lithuania
- County: Vilnius County
- Municipality: Vilnius District Municipality
- Eldership: Mickūnai Eldership

Population (2011)
  - Total: 1,426
- Time zone: UTC+2 (EET)
  - Summer (DST): UTC+3 (EEST)

Galgiai is a village in Vilnius District Municipality, Lithuania. According to the 2011 census, it had population of 1,426, an increase from 1,011 in 2001, 811 in 1989 and just 96 in 1959.

== History ==
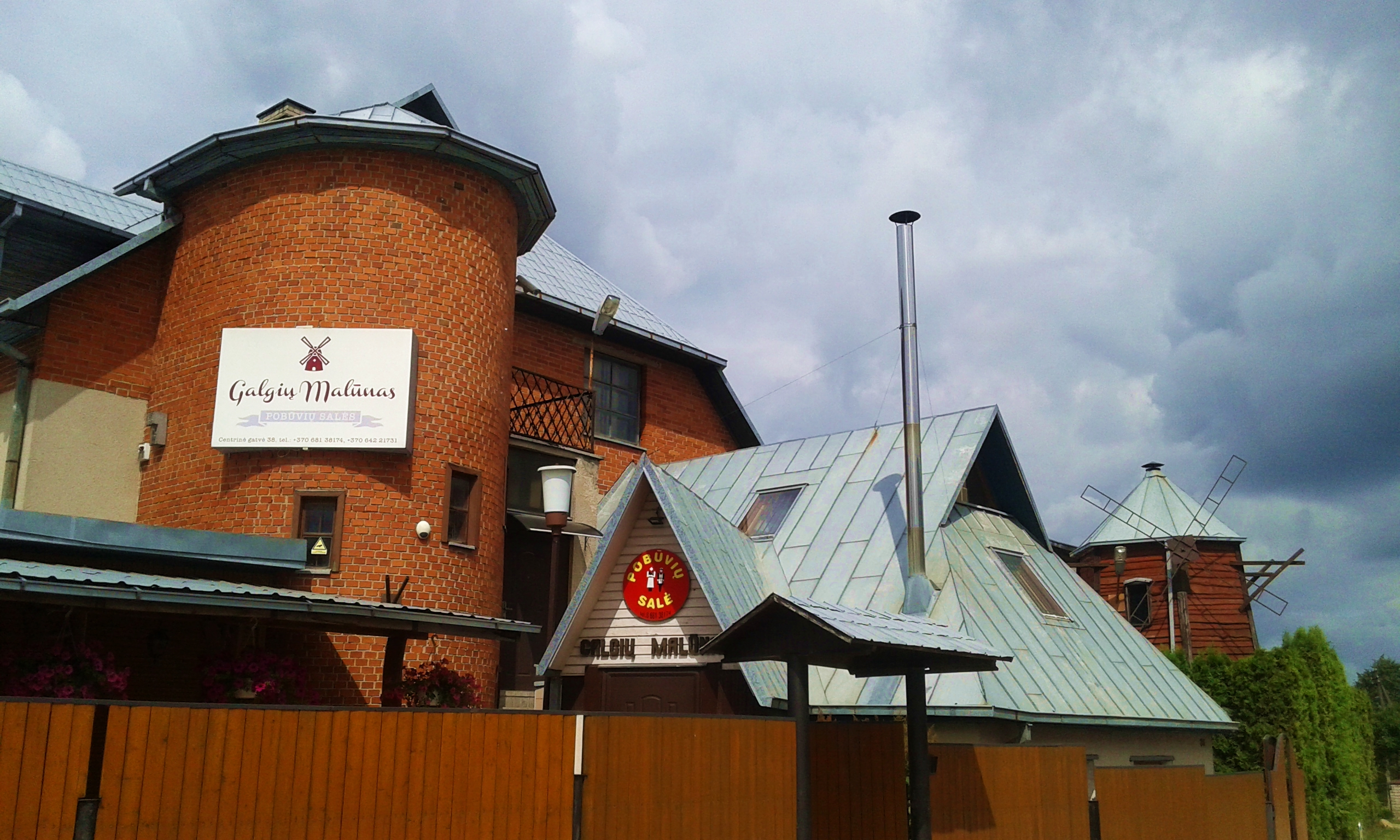
Restaurant Galgiai Mill

Before the second half of the 20th century, merely a small village of less than 100 inhabitants, Galgiai is a growing suburb of Vilnius just north of Naujoji Vilnia. Situated between private housing neighborhood Kairėnai to the north and Naujasis Antakalnis to the west, construction of which was started in the 2010s, Galgiai is territorially surrounded by Vilnius from three sides. Because of the convenient location near the capital, there are many construction works in Galgiai and the number of inhabitants is steadily growing.
