= Vėliučionys =

- Village
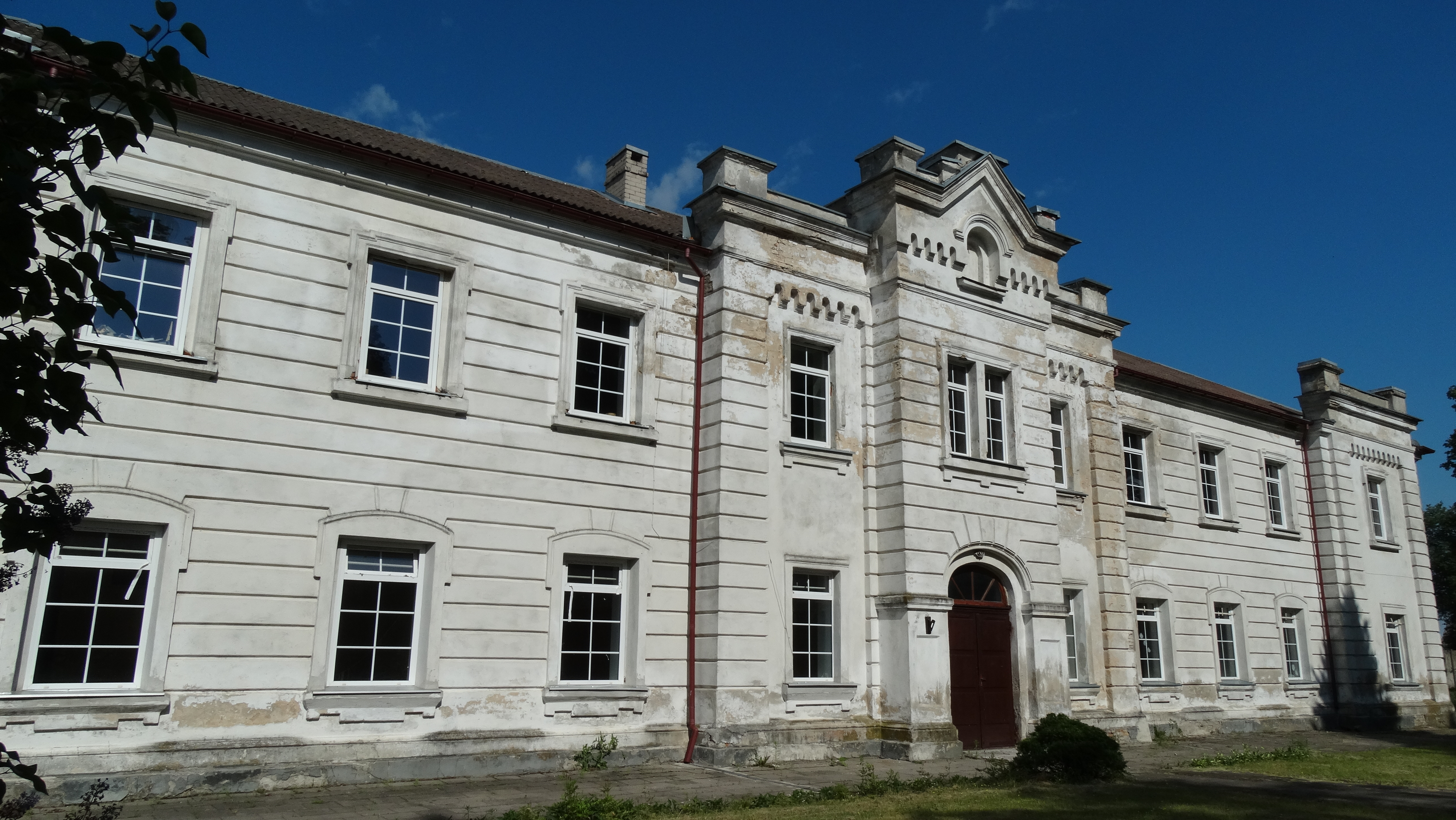
- Former school in Vėliučionys

- Location of Vėliučionys
- Coordinates: 54°39′N 25°27′E
- Country: Lithuania
- County: Vilnius County
- Municipality: Vilnius District Municipality
- Eldership: Šatrininkai eldership

Population (2001)
  - Total: 581
- Time zone: UTC+2 (EET)
  - Summer (DST): UTC+3 (EEST)

Vėliučionys is a village located in Vilnius District Municipality, 5 kilometers east of Vilnius city municipality, the capital of Lithuania. According to the census of 2001, the village has a population of 581.

== History ==
During World War II, on September 20–22, 1941, 1159 Jews from local shtetls are murdered in mass executions perpetrated by an Einsatzgruppen.
