= Rukainiai Eldership =

Rukainiai Eldership Rukainių seniūnija
- Eldership
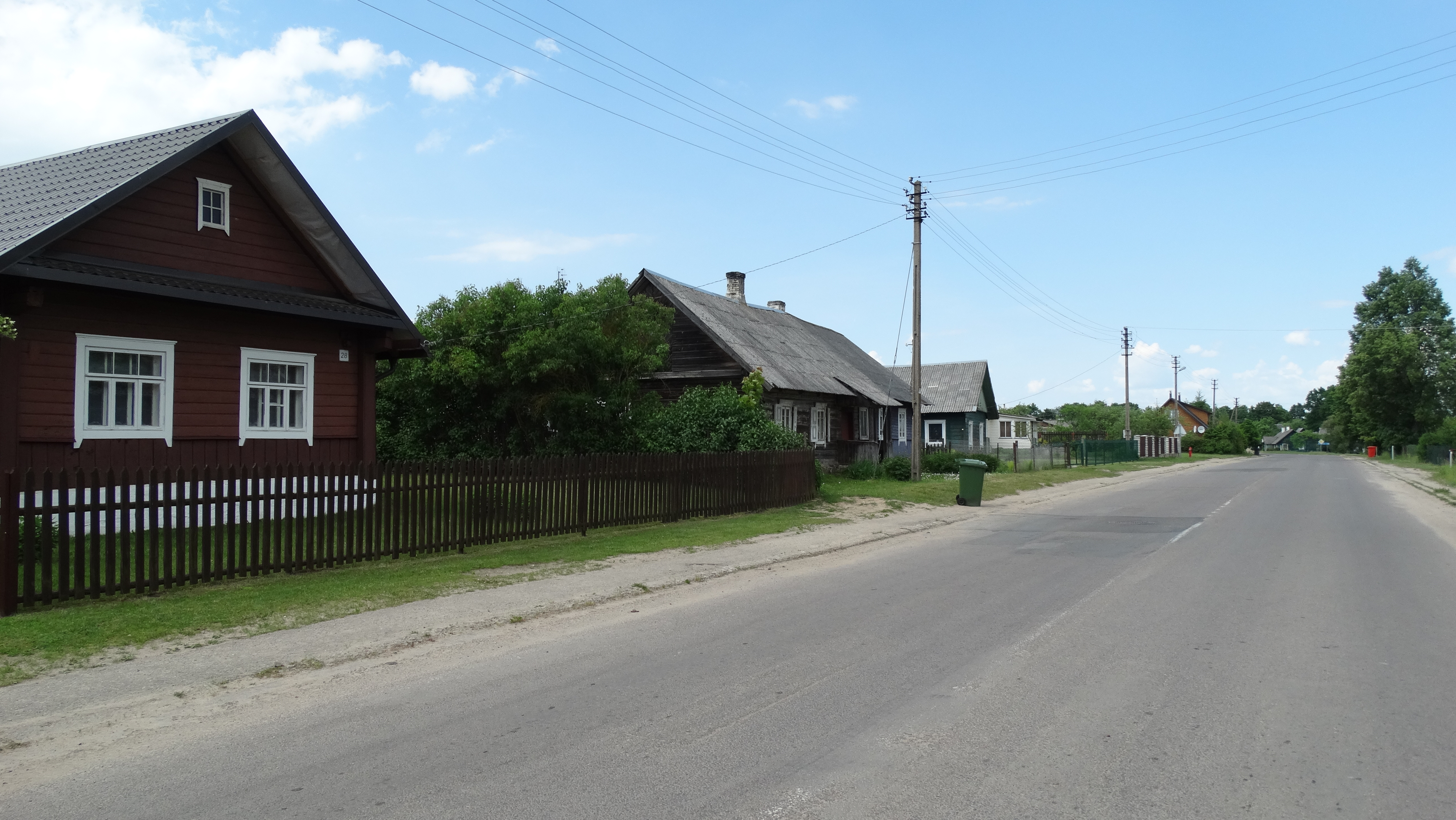

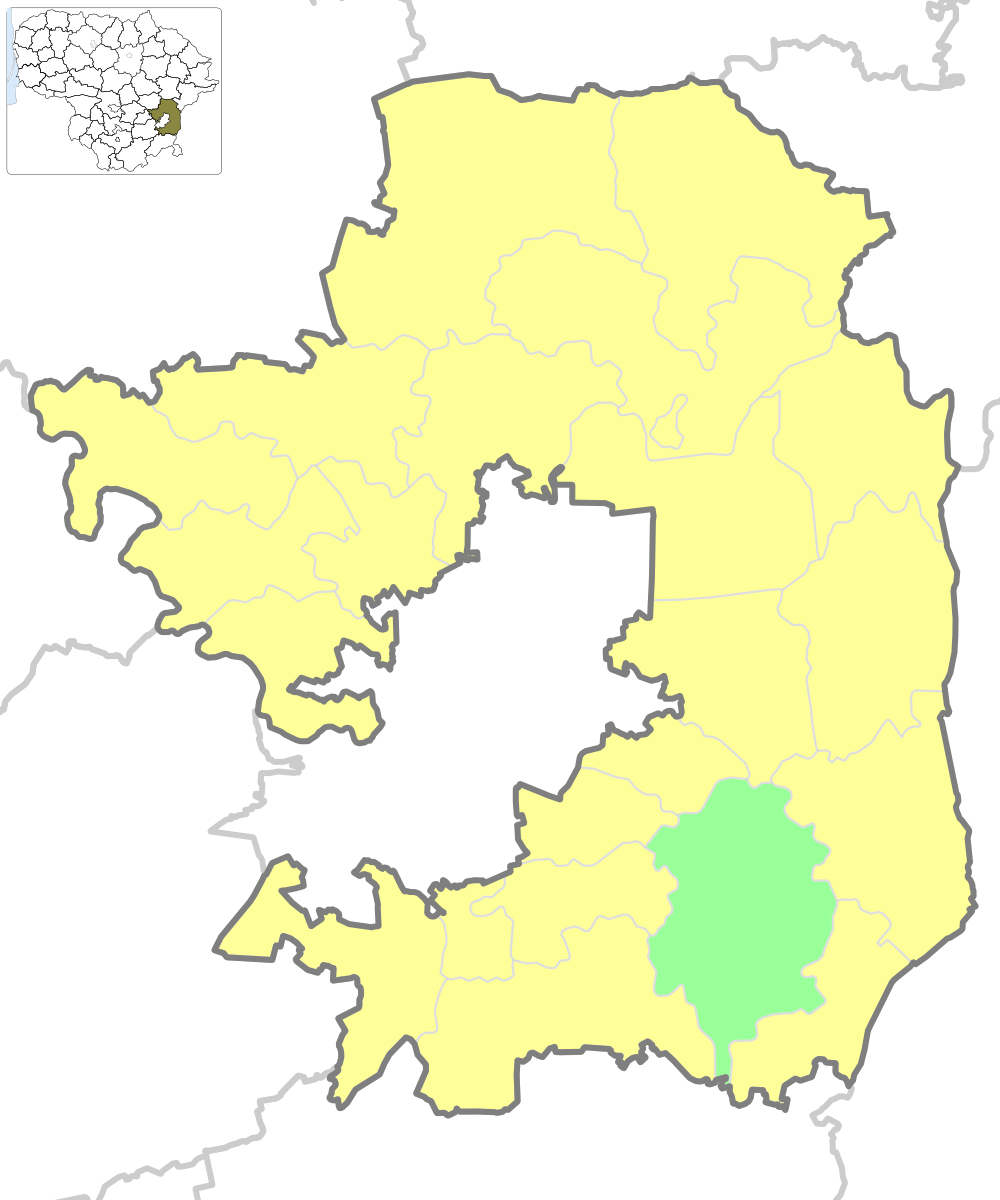
- Location of Rudamina Eldership
- Country: Lithuania
- Ethnographic region: Dzūkija
- County: Vilnius County
- Municipality: Vilnius District Municipality
- Administrative centre: Rukainiai

Area
  - Total: 144 km^{2} (56 sq mi)

Population
  - Total: 2,385
  - Density: 16.6/km^{2} (42.9/sq mi)
- Time zone: UTC+2 (EET)
  - Summer (DST): UTC+3 (EEST)
- Website: https://www.vrsa.lt

Rukainiai Eldership (Lithuanian: Rukainių seniūnija) is an eldership in Lithuania, located in Vilnius District Municipality, east of Vilnius.
