= Gineitiškės =

- Village
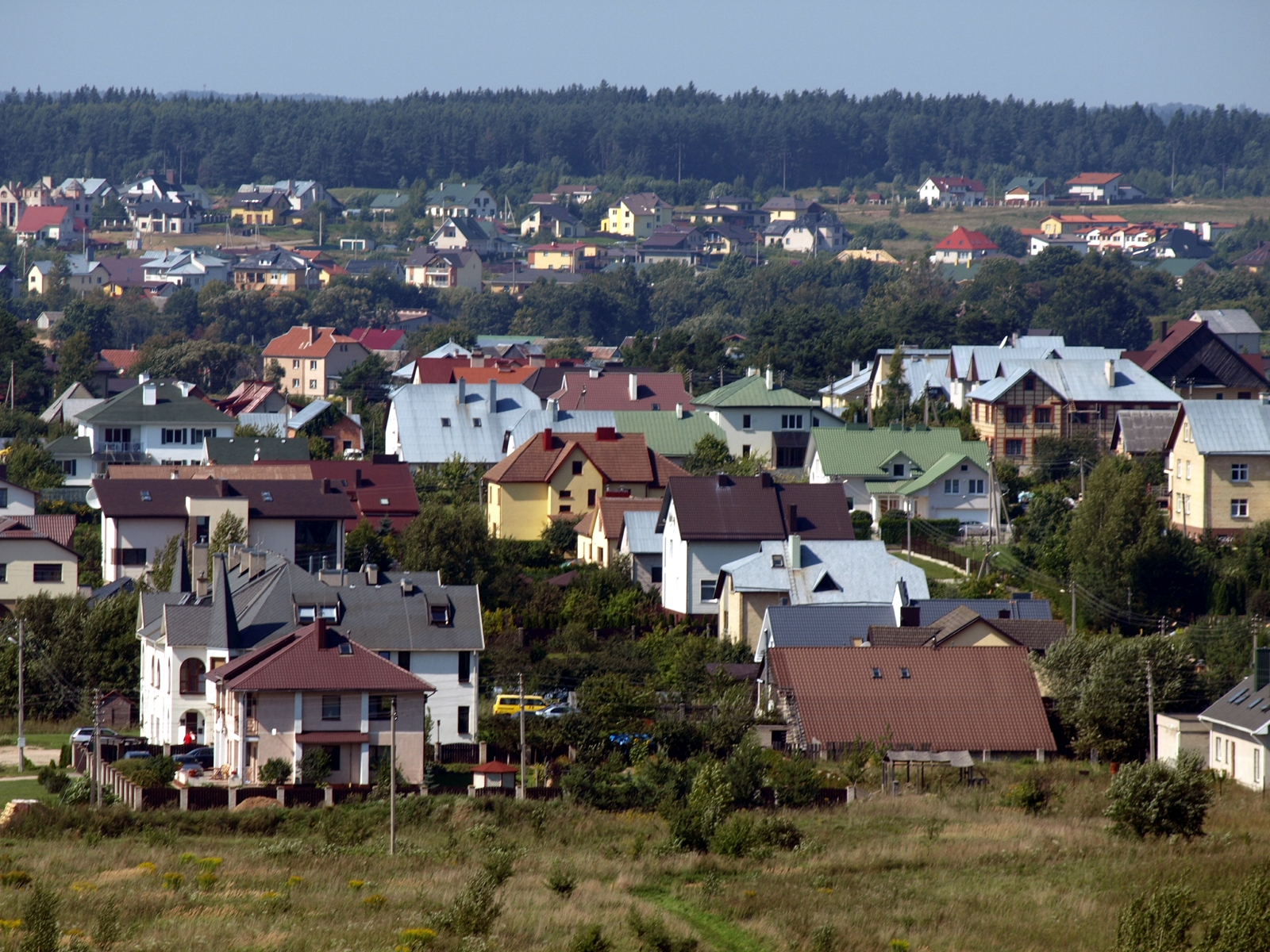
- Private houses of Gineitiškės village as seen from Pašilaičiai tower blocks.

- Location of Gineitiškės
- Coordinates: 54°44′20″N 25°12′00″E
- Country: Lithuania
- County: Vilnius County
- Municipality: Vilnius district municipality
- Eldership: Zujūnai eldership

Population (2011)
  - Total: 1,093
- Time zone: UTC+2 (EET)
  - Summer (DST): UTC+3 (EEST)

Gineitiškės is a village in the Vilnius district municipality, Lithuania, a suburb of Vilnius. According to the 2011 census, it had population of 1,093, up from 525 in 2001 and 109 in 1989.
