= Vilnius District Municipality =

Coordinates: 54°44′N 25°30′E

Vilnius District Municipality Vilniaus rajono savivaldybė
- Municipality
- Flag Coat of arms Brandmark
- Location of Vilnius district municipality in Lithuania
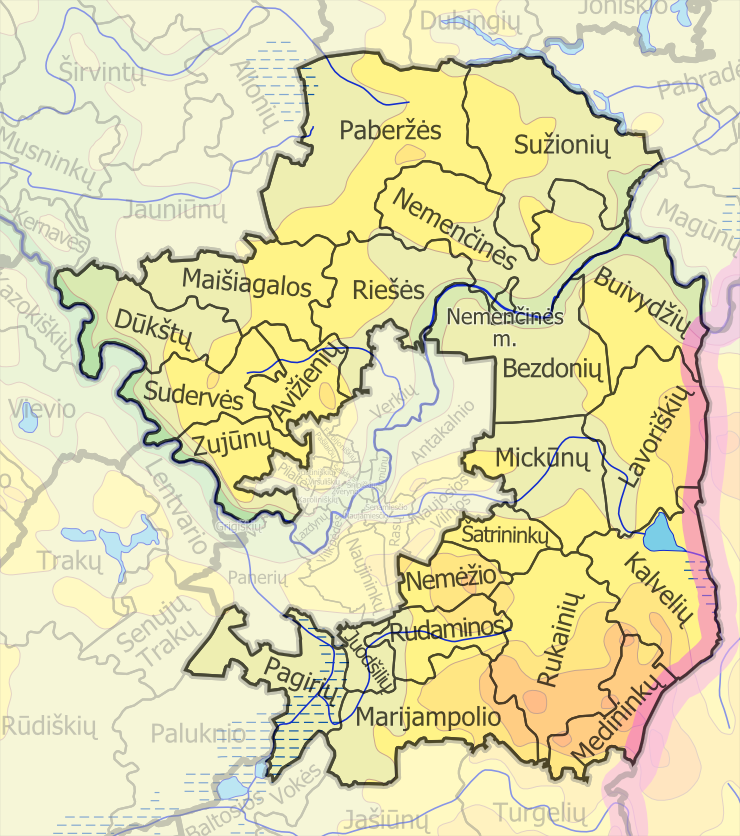
- Map of Vilnius district municipality
- Country: Lithuania
- Ethnographic region: Dzūkija/Aukštaitija
- County: Vilnius County
- Capital: Vilnius
- Elderships: List: Avižieniai; Bezdonys; Buivydžiai; Dūkštos; Juodšiliai; Kalveliai; Lavoriškės; Maišiagala; Marijampolis; Medininkai; Mickūnai; Nemenčinė (city); Nemenčinė (rural); Nemėžis; Paberžė; Pagiriai (Vilnius); Riešė; Rudamina; Rukainiai; Sudervė; Sužionys; Vėliučionys; Zujūnai

Government
  - Mayor: Robert Duchnevič (Social Democratic Party of Lithuania)

Area
  - Total: 2,129 km^{2} (822 sq mi)

Population (2023)
  - Total: 106,197
  - Density: 49.88/km^{2} (129.2/sq mi)
- Time zone: UTC+2 (EET)
  - Summer (DST): UTC+3 (EEST)
- Major settlements: Nemenčinė (pop. 4,749); Skaidiškės (pop. 4,051)
- Website: www.vrsa.lt

Vilnius District Municipality (Lithuanian: Vilniaus rajono savivaldybė) is one of the 60 municipalities in Lithuania. It surrounds the capital city of Vilnius on three sides. The municipality is also bordered by Trakai district and Elektrėnai municipality in the west, Astravyets and Ashmyany districts of Belarus in the east, Širvintos, Molėtai and Švenčionys districts in the north and Šalčininkai district in the south.

The population of the district is one of the fastest growing in Lithuania because of the migration of Vilnius' inhabitants to the suburbs. It stood at 116,584 in January 2024, up from 84 thousand in the early 1990s, meaning an increase by more than a third in less than 30 years.

== History ==
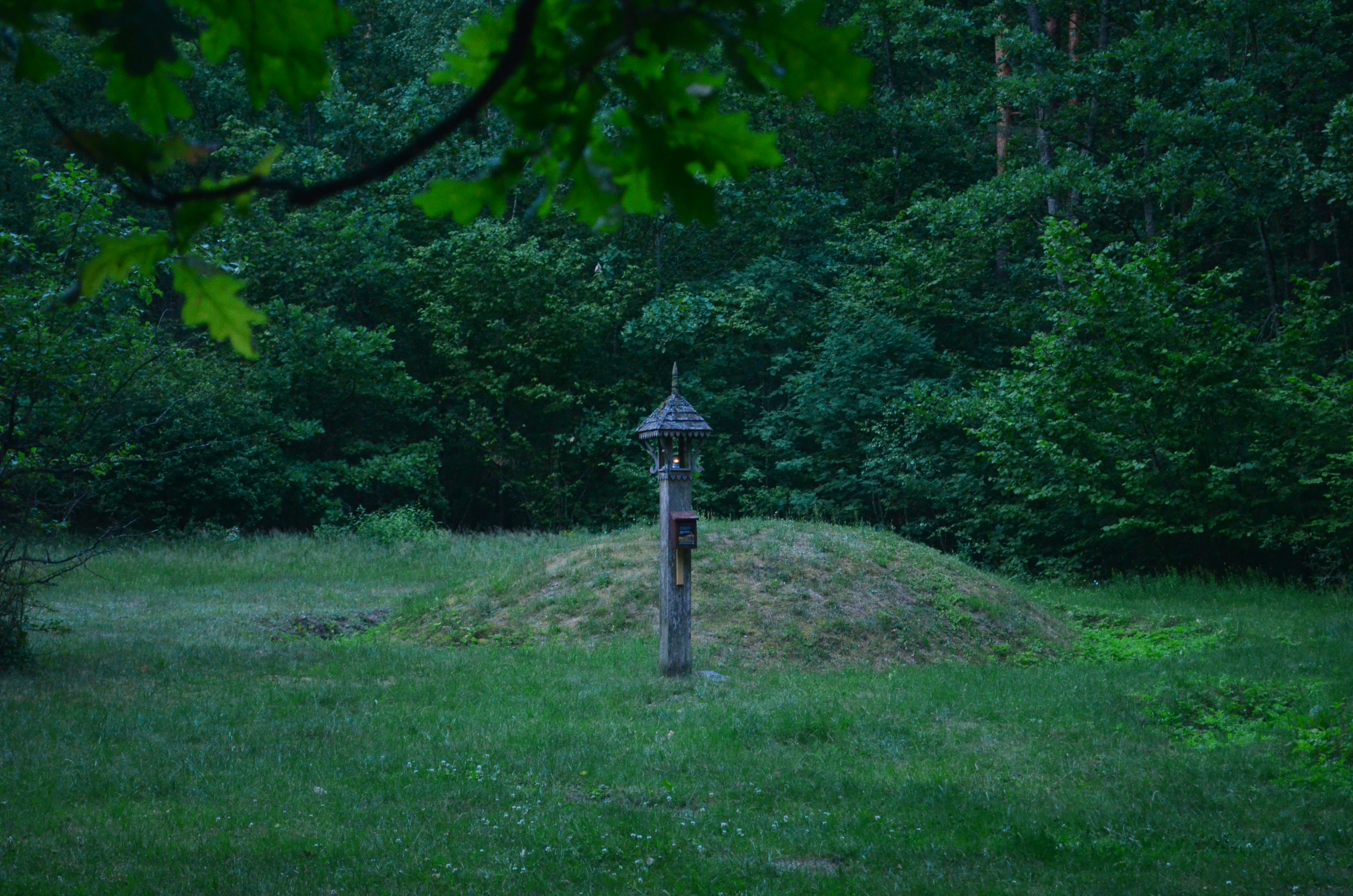
Tumuli of Karmazinai

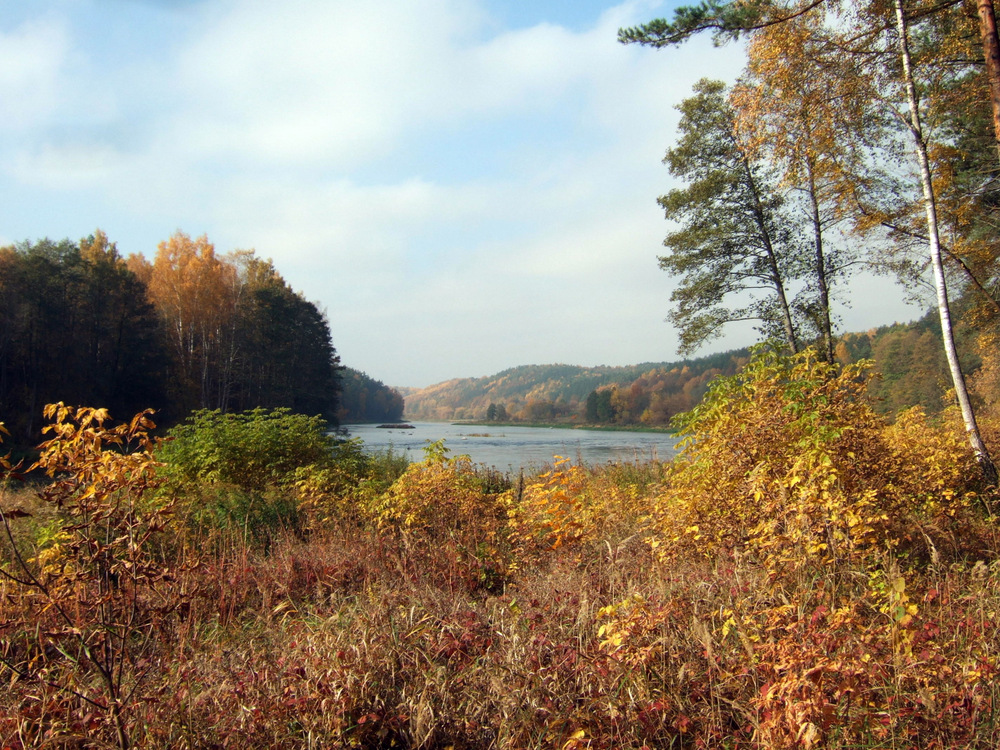
Neris Regional Park

Vilnius district municipality is situated in the territory once settled by the Baltic East Lithuanian Barrow Culture (c. 3/4th–11/12th century AD), and numerous archaeological sites from this period are situated within its borders. During the formation of the Grand Duchy of Lithuania, the major part of what is now Vilnius district municipality was the nucleus of the Duchy of Lithuania, while the territory to the north of Maišiagala belonged to the Neris Land. There is some evidence that Bukiškis just north of Vilnius whose historic name was Gedvydžiai could be associated with Duke Gedvydas and through this link – with Mindaugas. According to Jan Długosz, the pagan ruler of Lithuania Algirdas was cremated in the sacred forest of Kukaveitis near Maišiagala after his death in Maišiagala castle in 1377. Nemenčinė (1338), Maišiagala (1254, 1365) and Medininkai (1387), known from written sources from the 13th-14th centuries, were among the oldest settlements in Lithuania. These were trade and defense centers with castles as well as religious centers – after the Christianization of Lithuania, early churches were built here. As Vilnius was the capital of the Grand Duchy of Lithuania, the territory around the city was forming the very center of the state, so-called Lithuania proper. It was the major part of a much larger Vilnius Duchy and later – Vilnius Voivodeship. After the partitions of the Polish-Lithuanian Commonwealth, Vilna Governorate was formed and Vilensky Uyezd occupied all of what is now Vilnius district municipality. When Vilnius and its suburbs in 1923 were incorporated into Interwar Poland, what is now Vilnius district municipality was the core of Wilno-Troki County. After World War II, Vilnius district municipality was formed. The initially small Vilnius district (938 km^{2}) was soon significantly enlarged, absorbing Naujoji Vilnia district (in 1959) and Nemenčinė district (in 1962) and parts of Ukmergė district, but transferring some smaller administrative territories to Molėtai district and Švenčionys district, including Pabradė (in 1962). After 1962 (then 2313 km^{2}), there were only minor administrative reforms, attaching some territories from Vilnius district municipality (now 2129 km^{2}) to Vilnius city. In March 1987, the villages of Pašilaičiai, Fabijoniškės, Kelmija, Raisteliai and parts of the villages of Pavilionys, Baltoji Vokė, Prašiškės, Bajorai, Buivydiškės, Grigaičiai and Vanaginė were attached to Vilnius city. Almost all of the municipality belongs to the Vilnius urban belt, forming suburban environs of the capital city.

Some projects, that may have been changed the district radically were not implemented.

During the interwar period, hydropower plant was started to be built in 1938 only to be abandoned in 1940. The reservoir between Turniškės and Nemenčinė was not created. During the 70s, a plan to build a pumped storage plant in Sudervė was too dropped off and such a plant was built in Kruonis instead.

== Demographics ==
The district has significant Polish minority population in Lithuania, with 46% of the population claiming Polish ethnicity. But the number has been dwindling from more than 80% in the late 1980s because of suburbanisation, age structure (younger newcomer inhabitants are mostly Lithuanians, while older population in villages are mostly Poles) and acculturation.

At the 2011 Census, Poles amounted to 52.07% out of 95,348 inhabitants. 32.47% were Lithuanians, 8.01% Russians, 4.17% Belarusians, 0.65% Ukrainians and 0.11% Jews.

In 2021, according to the census results, ethnographic composition was the following: Poles – 46.75%, Lithuanians – 38.52%, Russians – 7.35%, Belarusians – 3.26%, Ukrainians – 0.63%, Other – 0.86% and 2.64% of inhabitants did not declare their ethnographic identity.

== Elderships ==
The municipality is divided into 23 elderships:

#	Eldership	Coat of Arms	Administrative center	Area in km^{2}	Population (2019)	Density per km^{2}
1	Avižieniai Eldership		Avižieniai	52.08	11,598	223
2	Bezdonys Eldership	-	Bezdonys	121.42	2,886	24
3	Buivydžiai Eldership		Buivydžiai	98.03	908	9
4	Dūkštos Eldership	–	Dūkštos	89.66	1,930	22
5	Juodšiliai Eldership	–	Juodšiliai	23.63	4,671	198
6	Kalveliai Eldership	–	Kalveliai	119.91	4,170	35
7	Lavoriškės Eldership	–	Lavoriškės	121.62	2,277	19
8	Maišiagala Eldership		Maišiagala	99.9	2,872	29
9	Marijampolis Eldership	–	Marijampolis	121.88	3,553	29
10	Medininkai Eldership		Medininkai	64.24	1,068	17
11	Mickūnai Eldership		Mickūnai	93.56	5,583	60
12	Nemenčinė Eldership	–	Nemenčinė	147.23	3,728	25
13	Nemenčinė City Eldership		Nemenčinė	3.98	4,886	1228
14	Nemėžis Eldership		Nemėžis	39.76	9,062	228
15	Paberžė Eldership		Paberžė	208.81	3,407	16
16	Pagiriai Eldership	–	Pagiriai	89.39	7,202	81
17	Riešė Eldership		Didžioji Riešė	103.76	6,498	63
18	Rudamina Eldership		Rudamina	52.49	5,886	112
19	Rukainiai Eldership	–	Rukainiai	141.21	2,648	19
20	Sudervė Eldership	–	Sudervė	71.29	2,871	40
21	Sužionys Eldership	–	Sužionys	164.42	1,791	11
22	Šatrininkai Eldership	–	Vėliučionys	35.40	2,966	84
23	Zujūnai Eldership	–	Zujūnai	65.44	7,467	114

== Structure ==
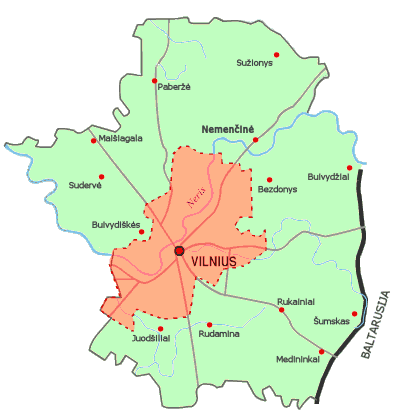
Vilnius district

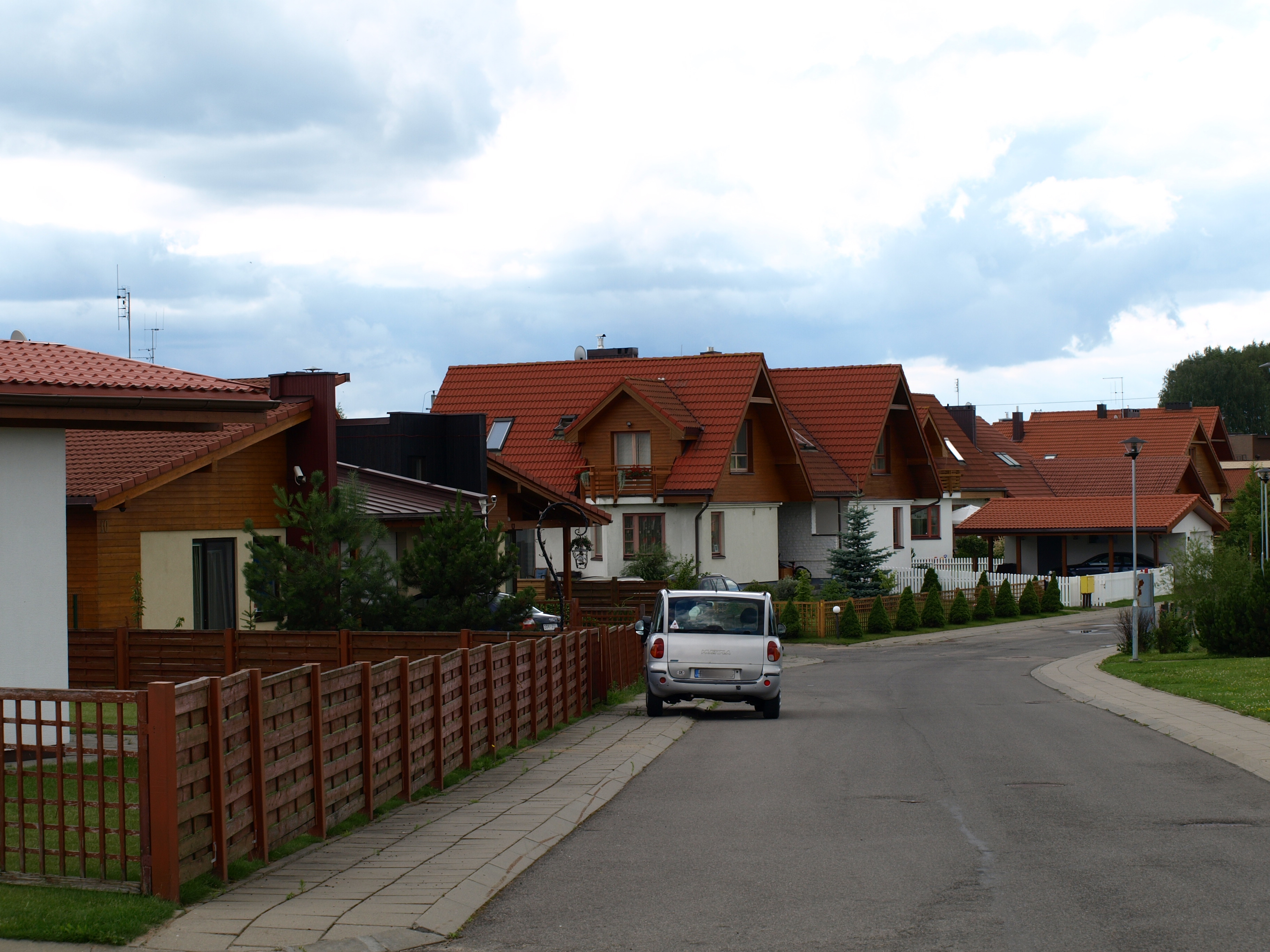
New Klevinė settlement in Vilnius district municipality. Because of recent urban sprawl, such new fast-growing quarters surround Vilnius city

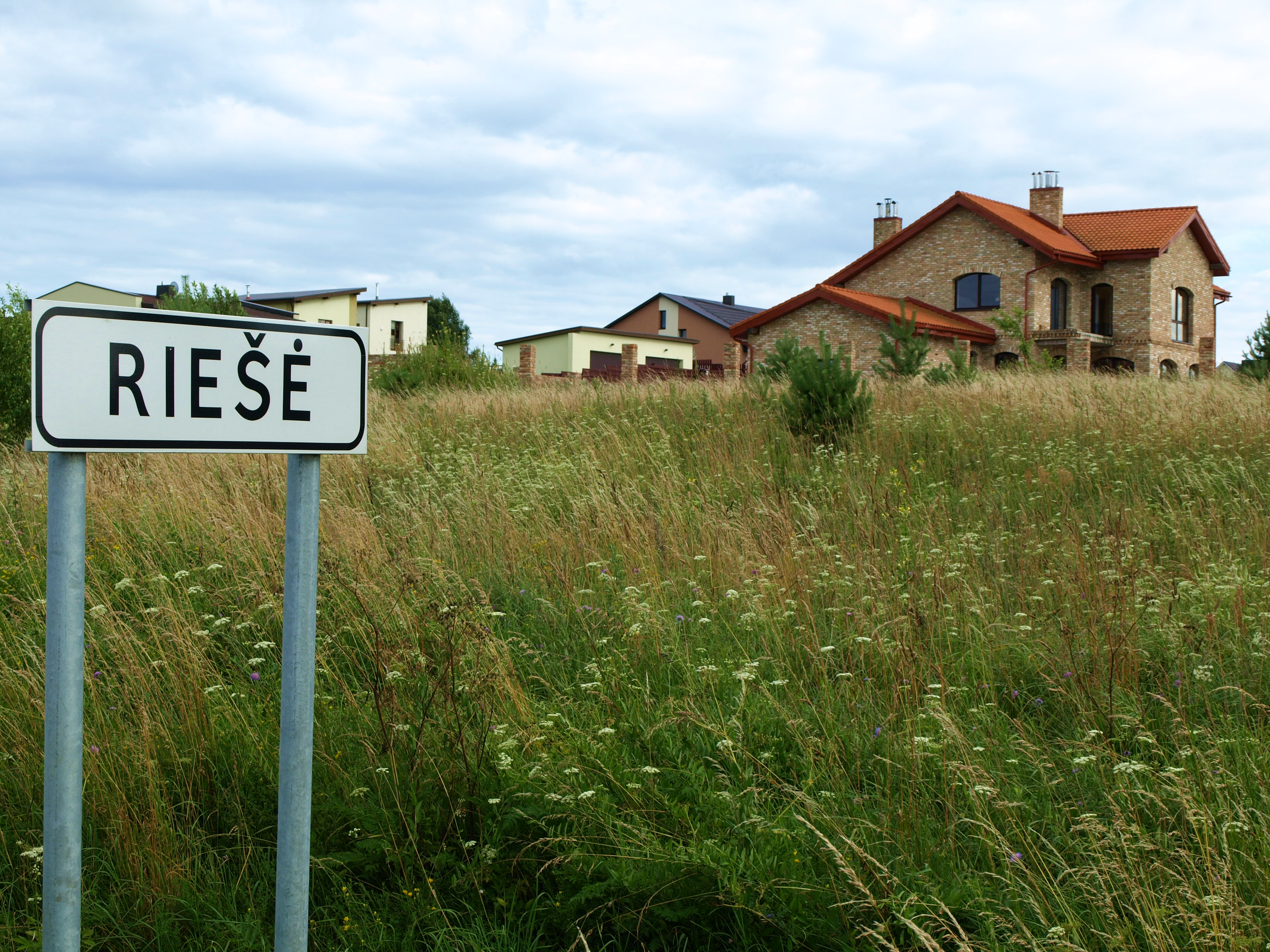
Riešė village in Vilnius district municipality. One of the fastest growing localities in the vicinity of the capital.

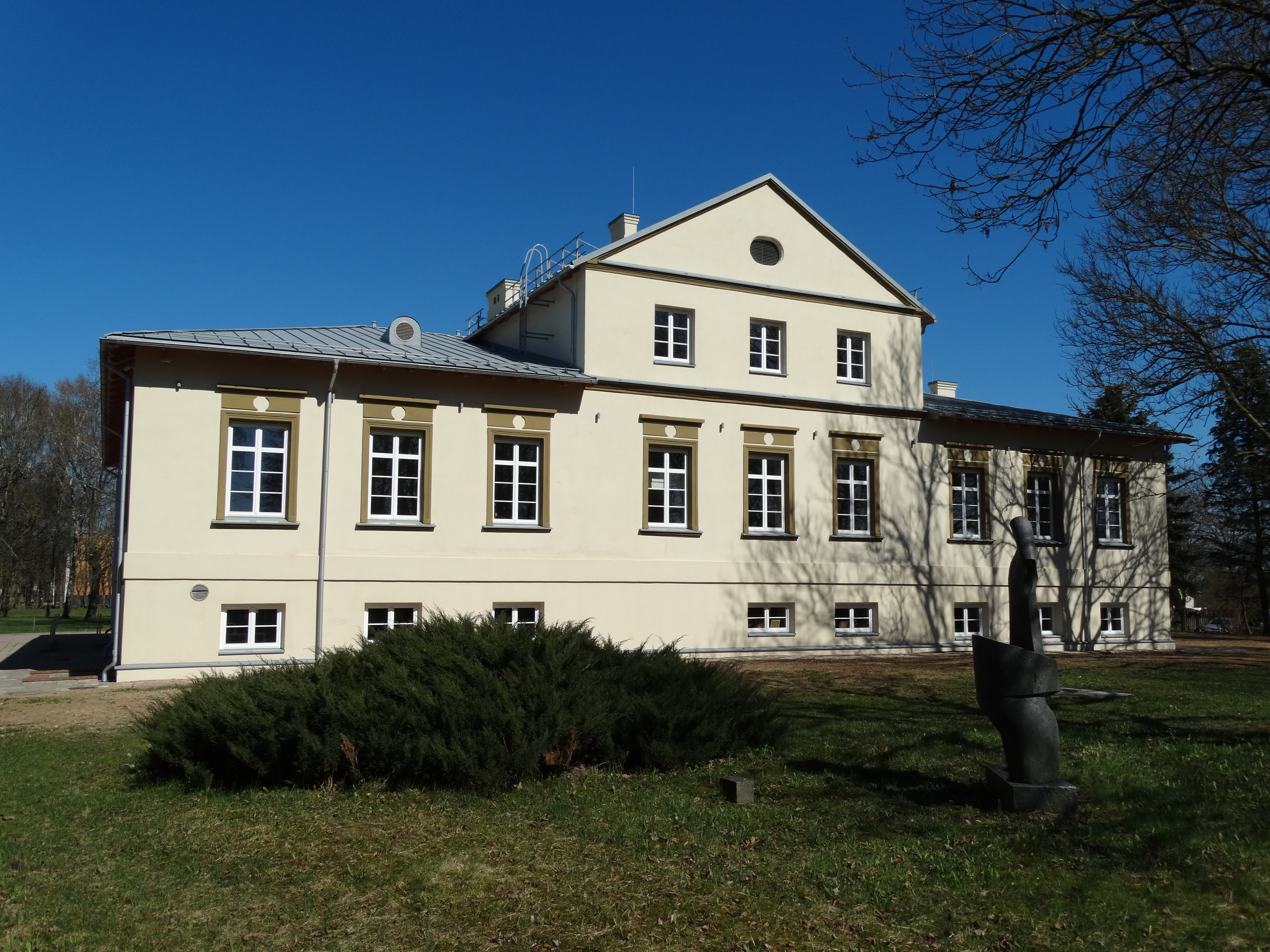
Neoclassical Maišiagala manor, Vilnius district municipality.

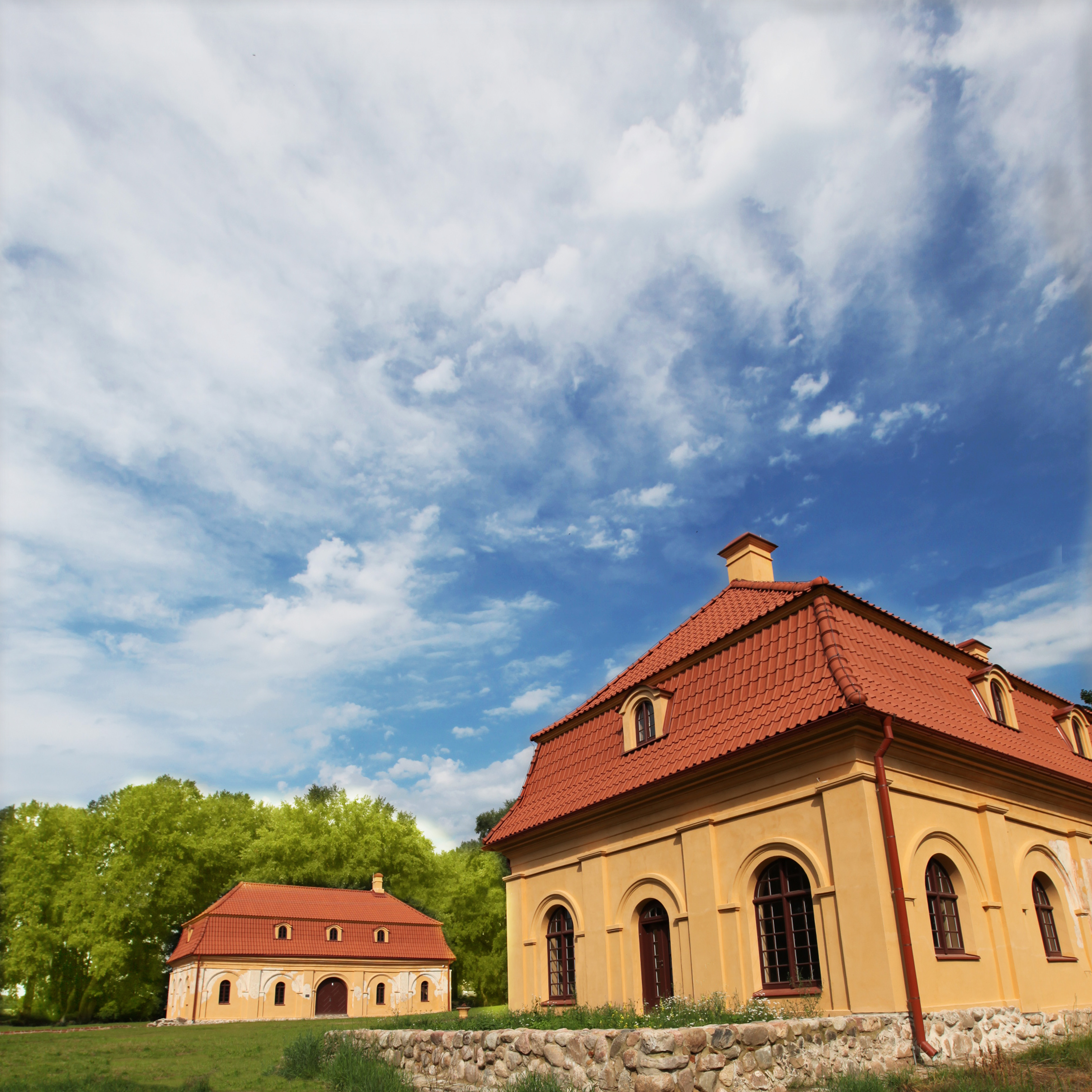
Baroque Liubavas manor buildings in Riešė elderate, Vilnius district municipality.

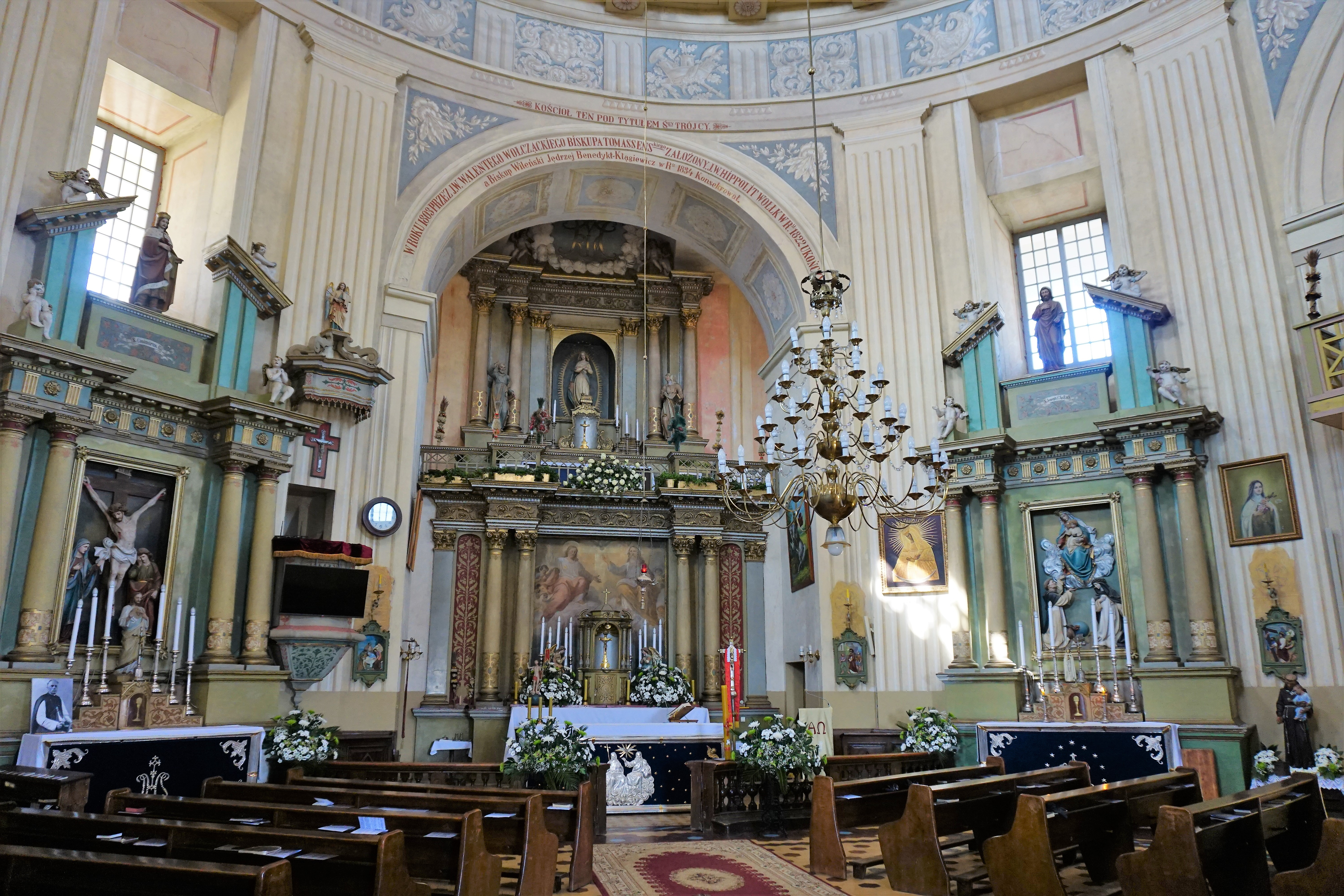
Interior of early XIX c. Sudervė church, which belongs to a rare in Lithuania rotonda type building

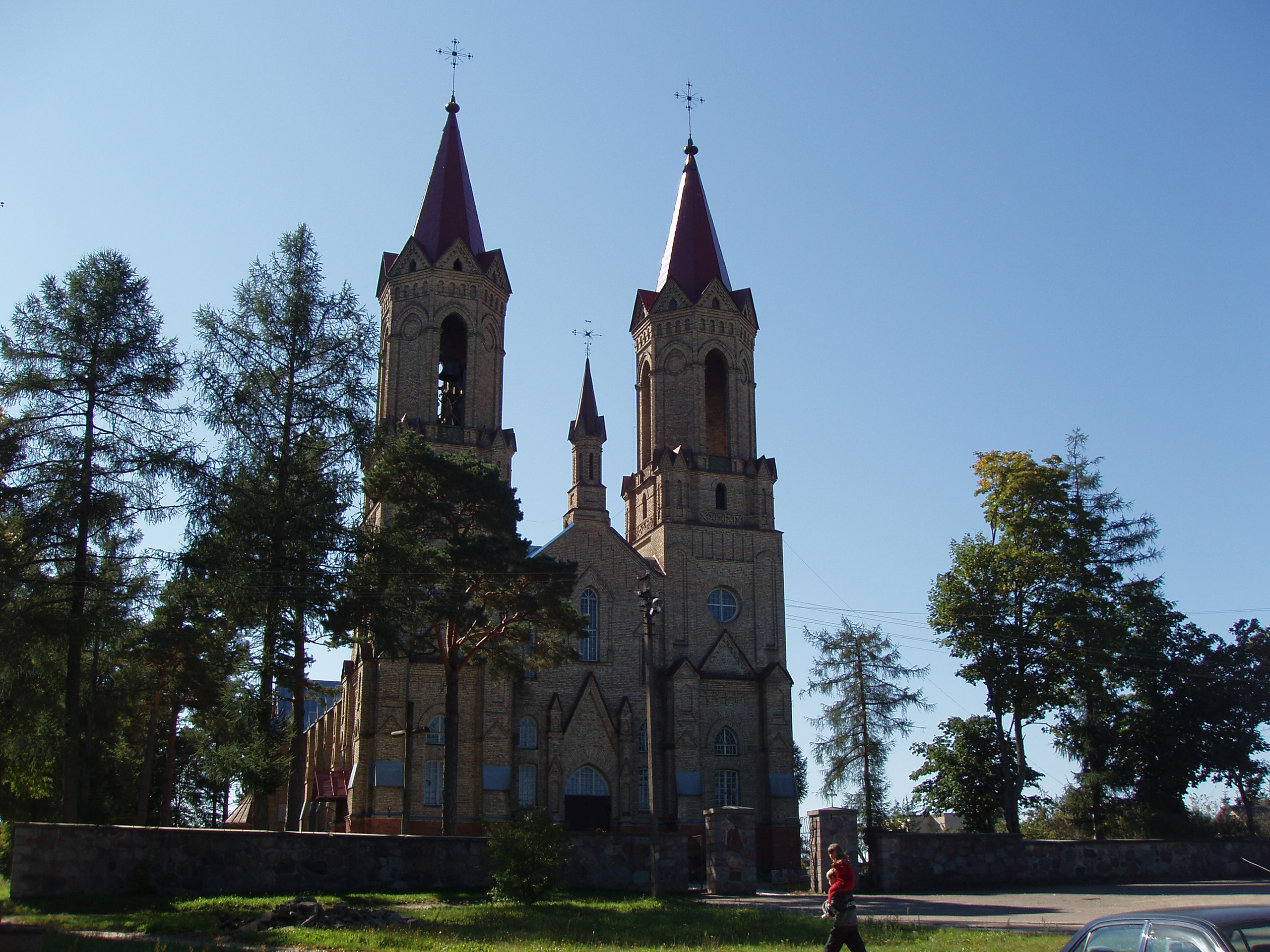
Neogothic Catholic church in Lavoriškės, Vilnius district municipality.

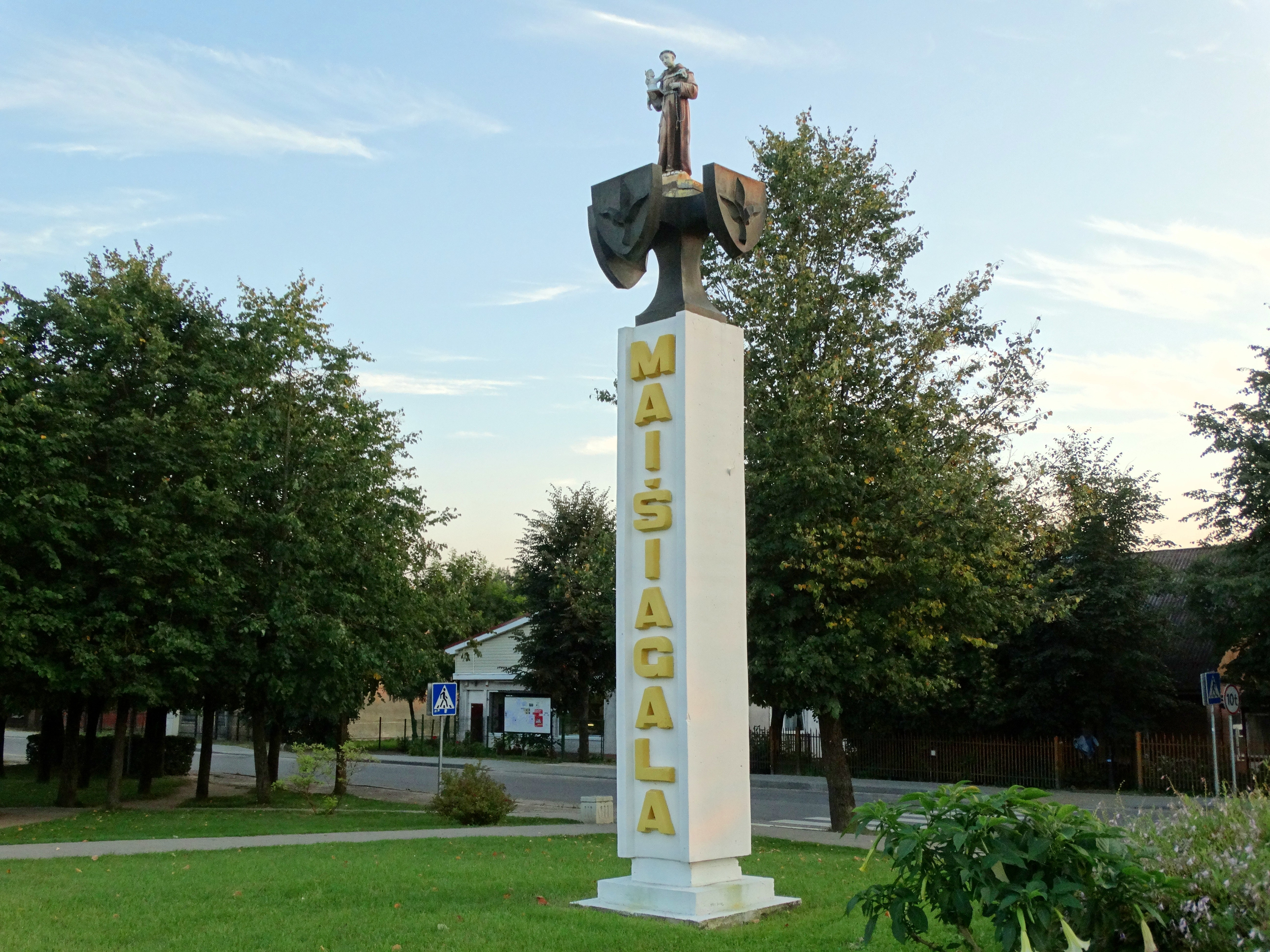
Statue of Saint Anthony of Padua atop obelisk in Maišiagala, historic town of Vilnius district municipality. The town's coat of arms also depicts Anthony of Padua.

District structure.

- one city – Nemenčinė;
- four small towns: Bezdonys, Maišiagala, Mickūnai, Šumskas
- 1091 villages.

Largest residential areas by population (2011 or 2021 – if specified):

- Nemenčinė – 5,054
- Skaidiškės – 4,133
- Rudamina (Vilnius) – 3,981
- Pagiriai (Vilnius) – 3,451
- Didžioji Riešė – 2,520
- Nemėžis – 2,498
- Avižieniai – 2,125
- Valčiūnai – 1,874
- Juodšiliai – 1,744
- Zujūnai – 1,660
- Maišiagala – 1,636
- Kalveliai – 1,592
- Galgiai – 1,426
- Mickūnai – 1,389
- Grigaičiai – 1,325
- Buivydiškės – 1,314
- Vaidotai – 1,287
- Riešė – 1,234
- Gineitiškės – 1,093
- Kalviškės – 974
- Bajorai – 945 (2021)
- Bukiškis – 922
- Paberžė – 919
- Šumskas – 919
- Marijampolis – 870
- Rastinėnai – 805 (2021)
- Rukainiai – 770
- Bendoriai – 764
- Bezdonys – 743
- Didžiosios Kabiškės – 716
- Mostiškės – 631
- Lavoriškės – 621
- Sudervė – 588 (2021)
- Anavilis – 574
- Glitiškės – 549
- Lindiniškės – 534 (2021)
- Brinkiškės – 532 (2021)
- Vėliučionys – 516
- Medininkai – 493
- Papiškės – 489 (2021)
- Pikeliškės – 458 (2021)
- Keturiasdešimt Totorių – 451
- Melekonys – 450 (2021)
- Saldenė – 446 (2021)
- Viktariškės – 446 (2021)
- Kuprioniškės – 424 (2021)
- Skirgiškės – 423 (2021)
- Pakalniškės – 423 (2021)
- Pikutiškės – 402 (2021)
- Daržininkai – 401 (2021)
- Parudaminys – 397 (2021)
- Sužionys – 397
- Skaisteriai – 389 (2021)
- Kena – 369 (2021)

== International relations ==
=== Twin towns – Sister cities ===
Vilnius District Municipality is twinned with:

- Radom, Poland

== Gallery ==
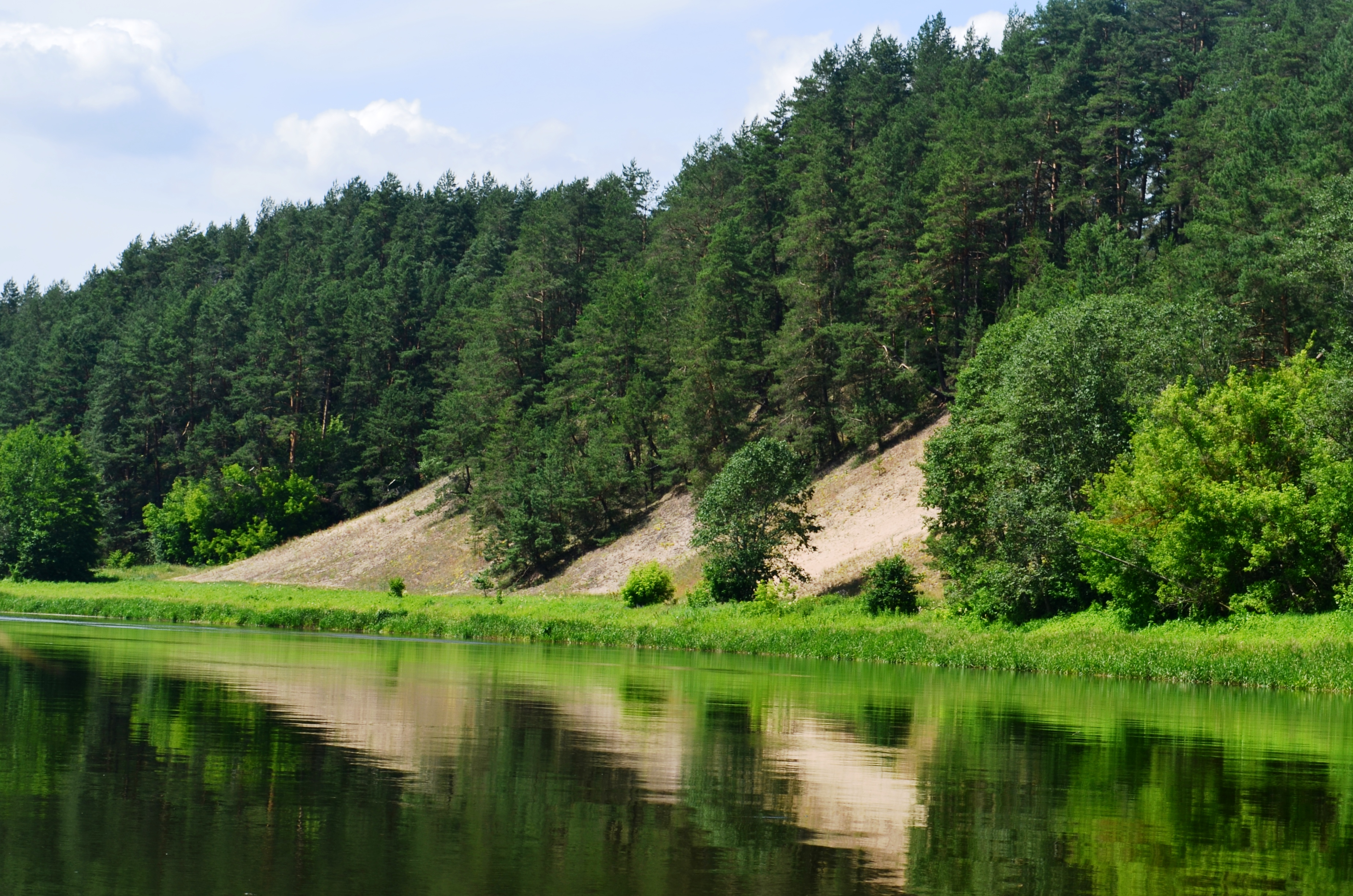
Neris river outcrop near Airėnai village

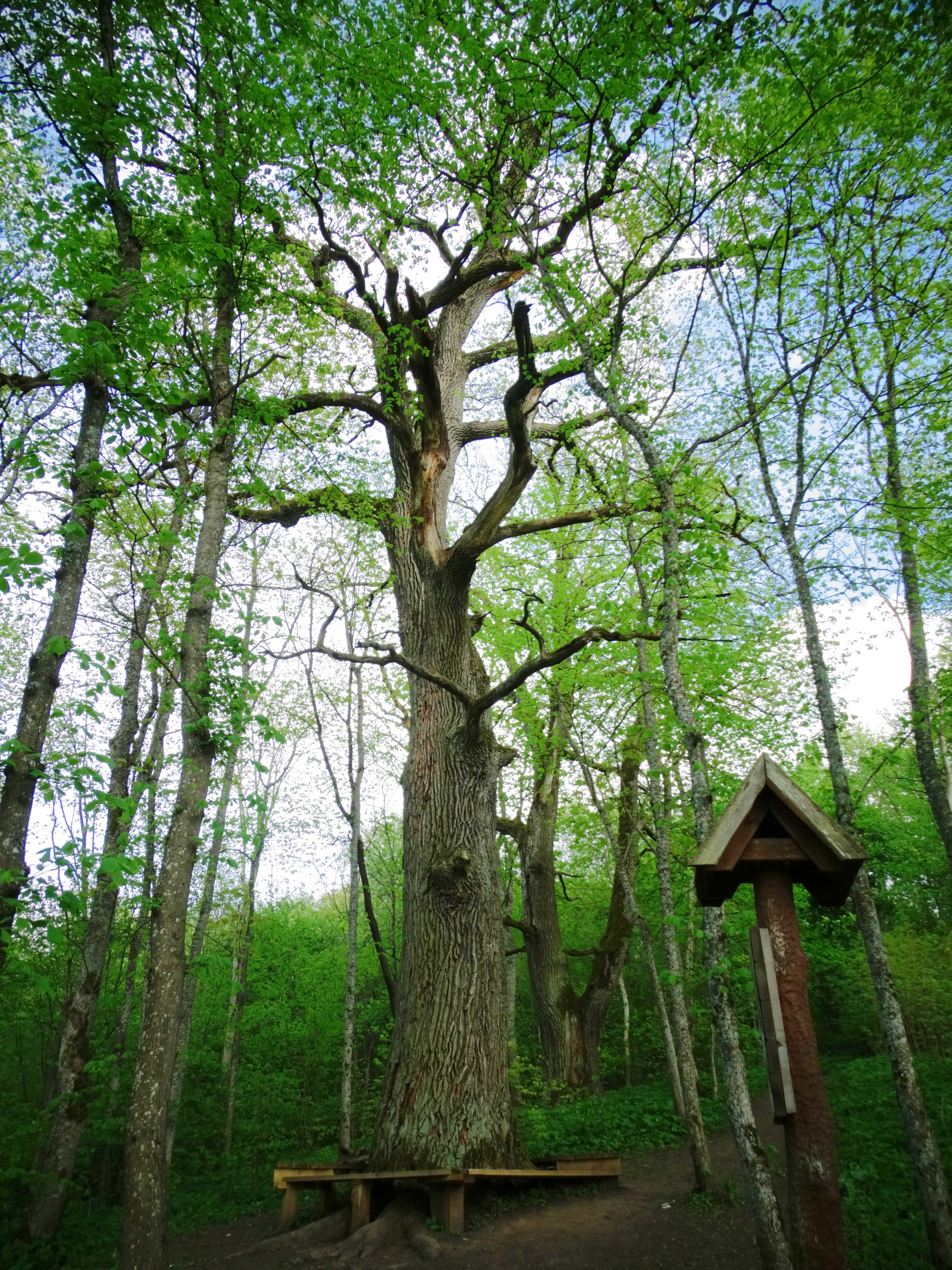
Sacred Daubos Oak in Neris Regional Park

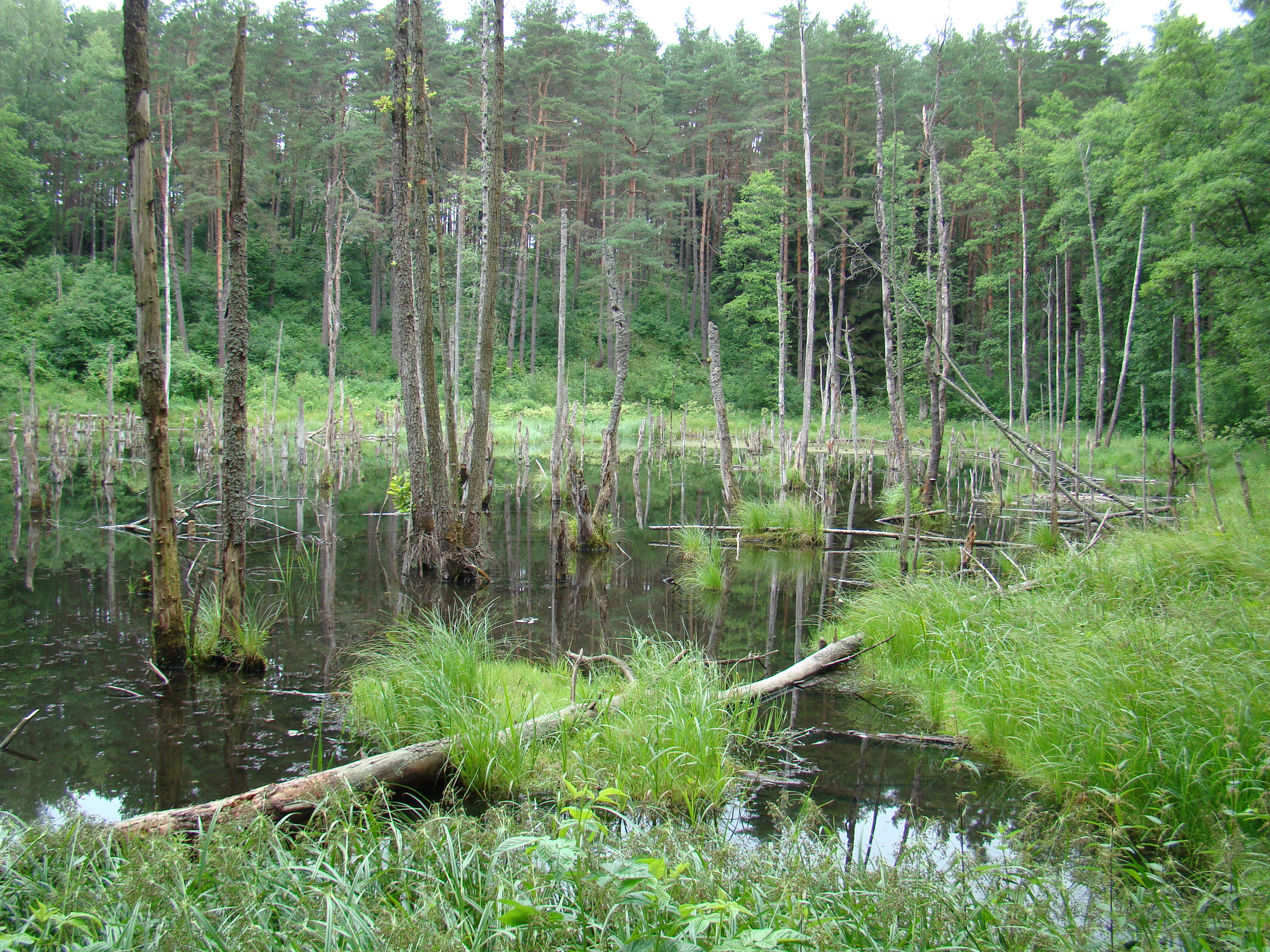
Swamp near Šilėnai

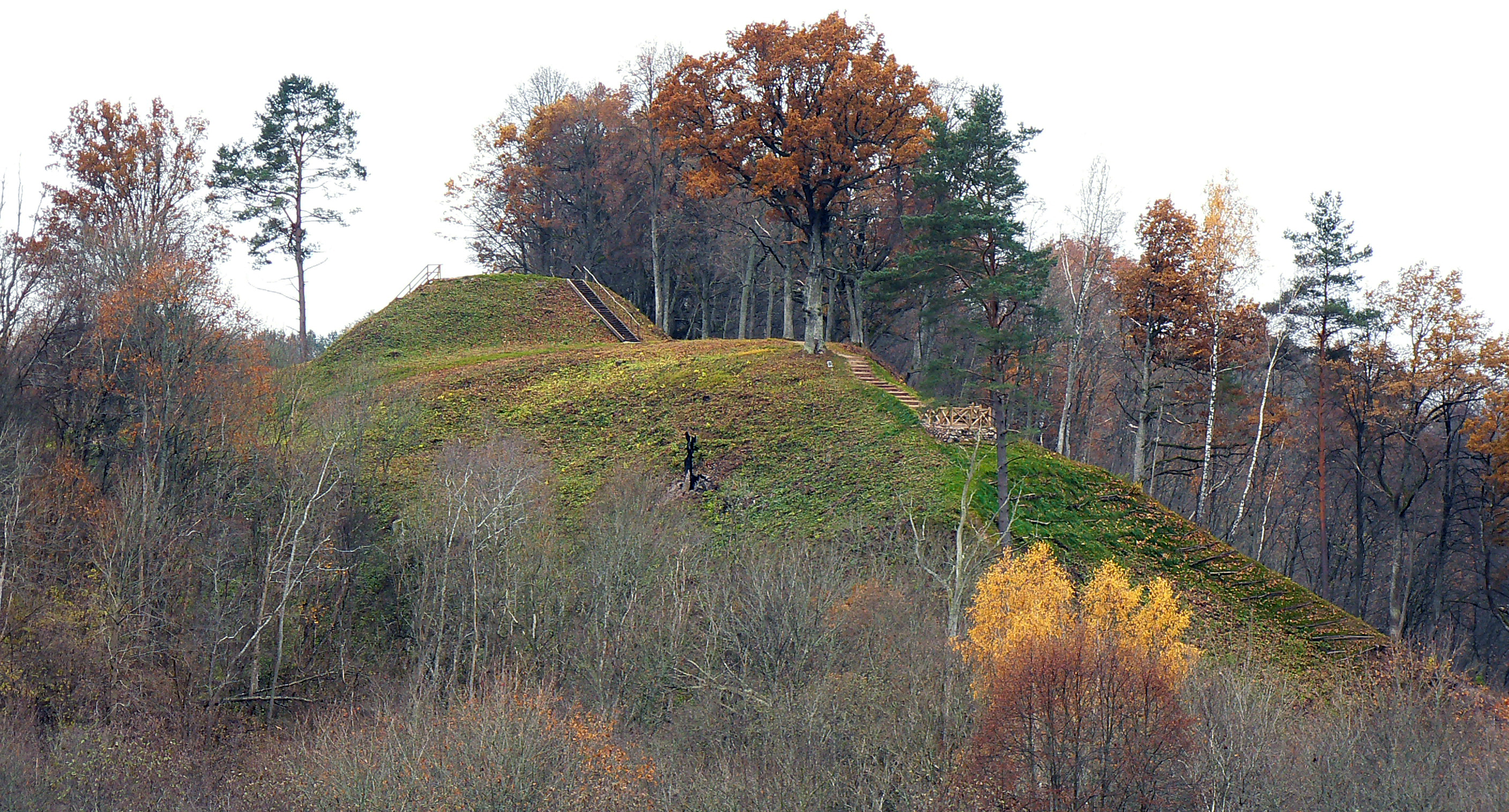
Buivydai hillfort

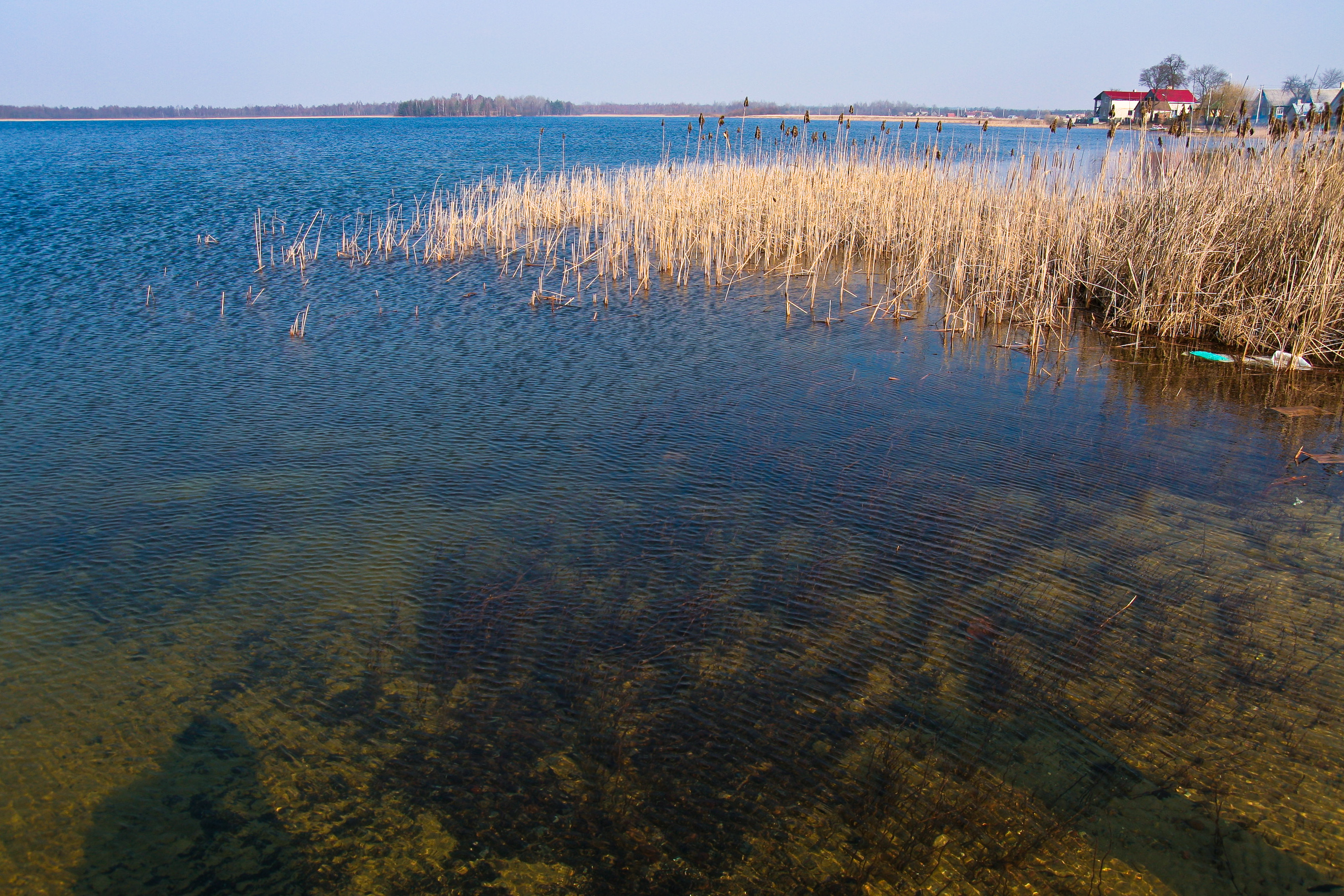
Ilgutis lake near Keturiasdešimt Totorių

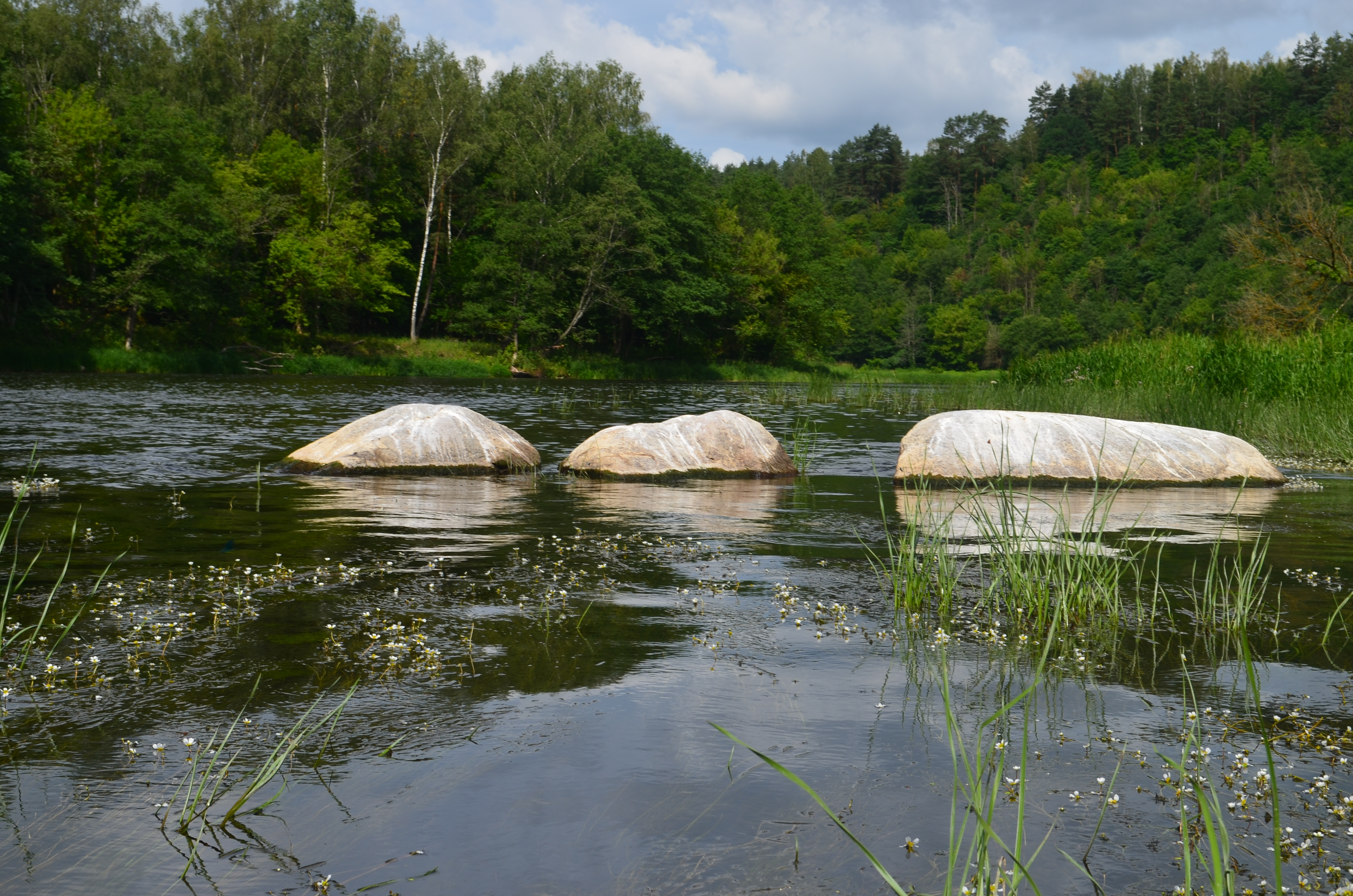
Stones "Three Brothers" near Sudervė

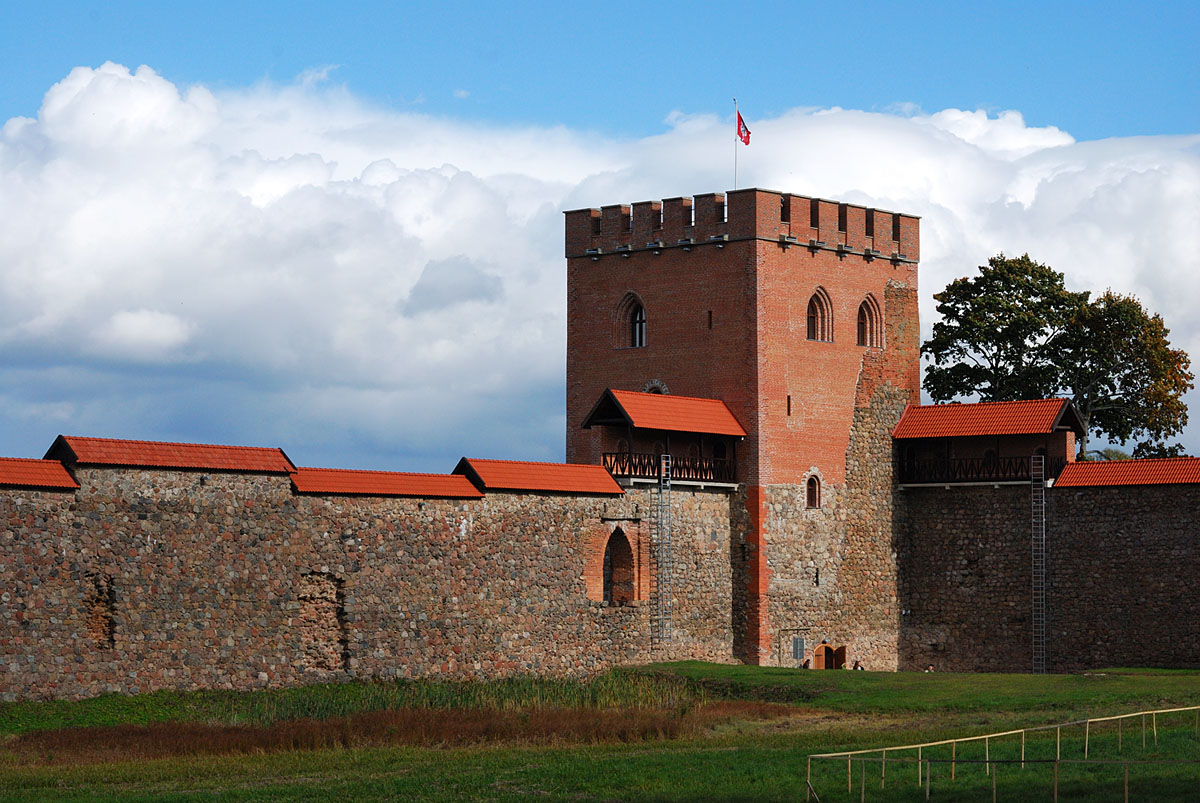
Medininkai Castle

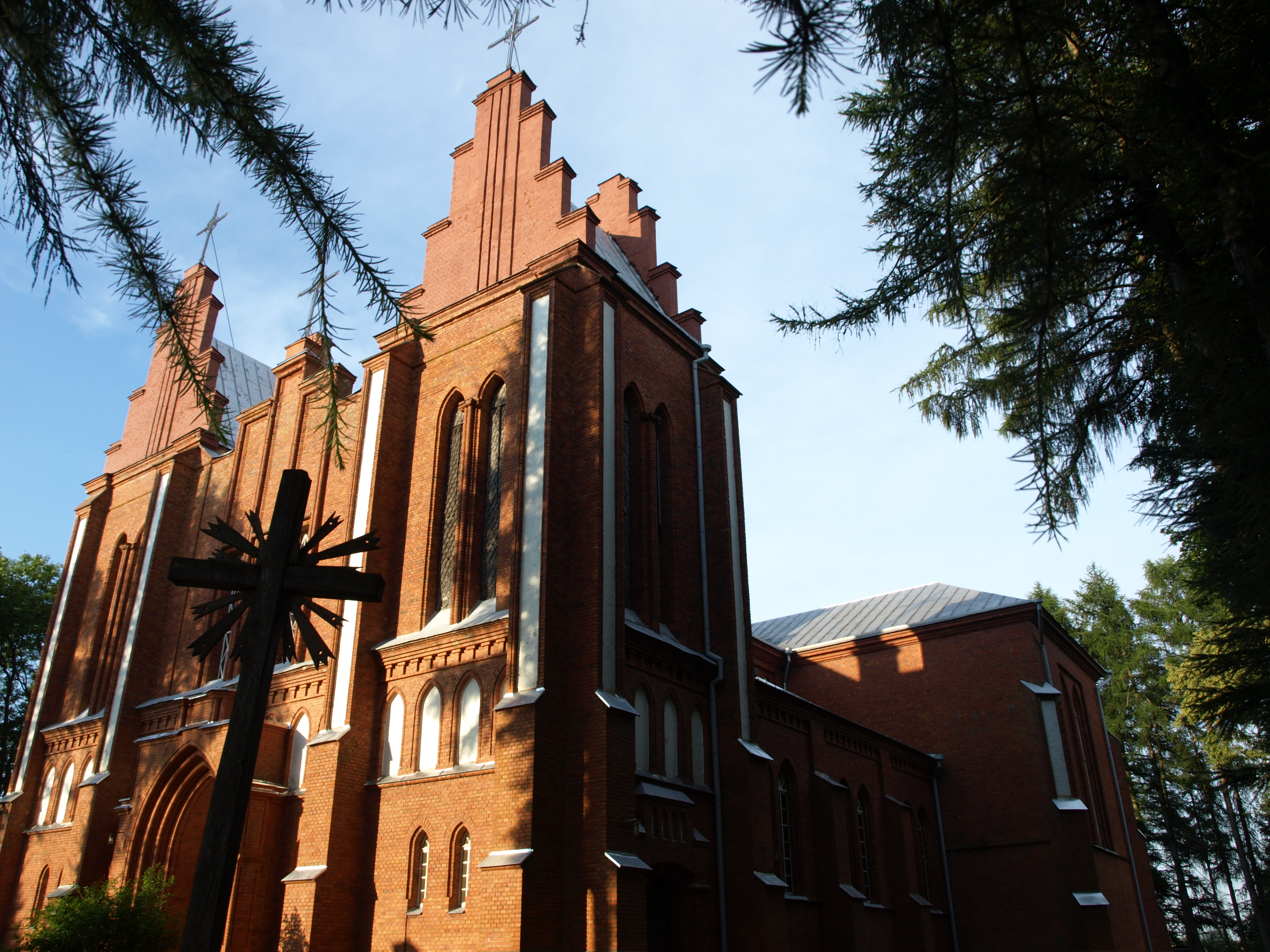
Catholic church in Paberžė

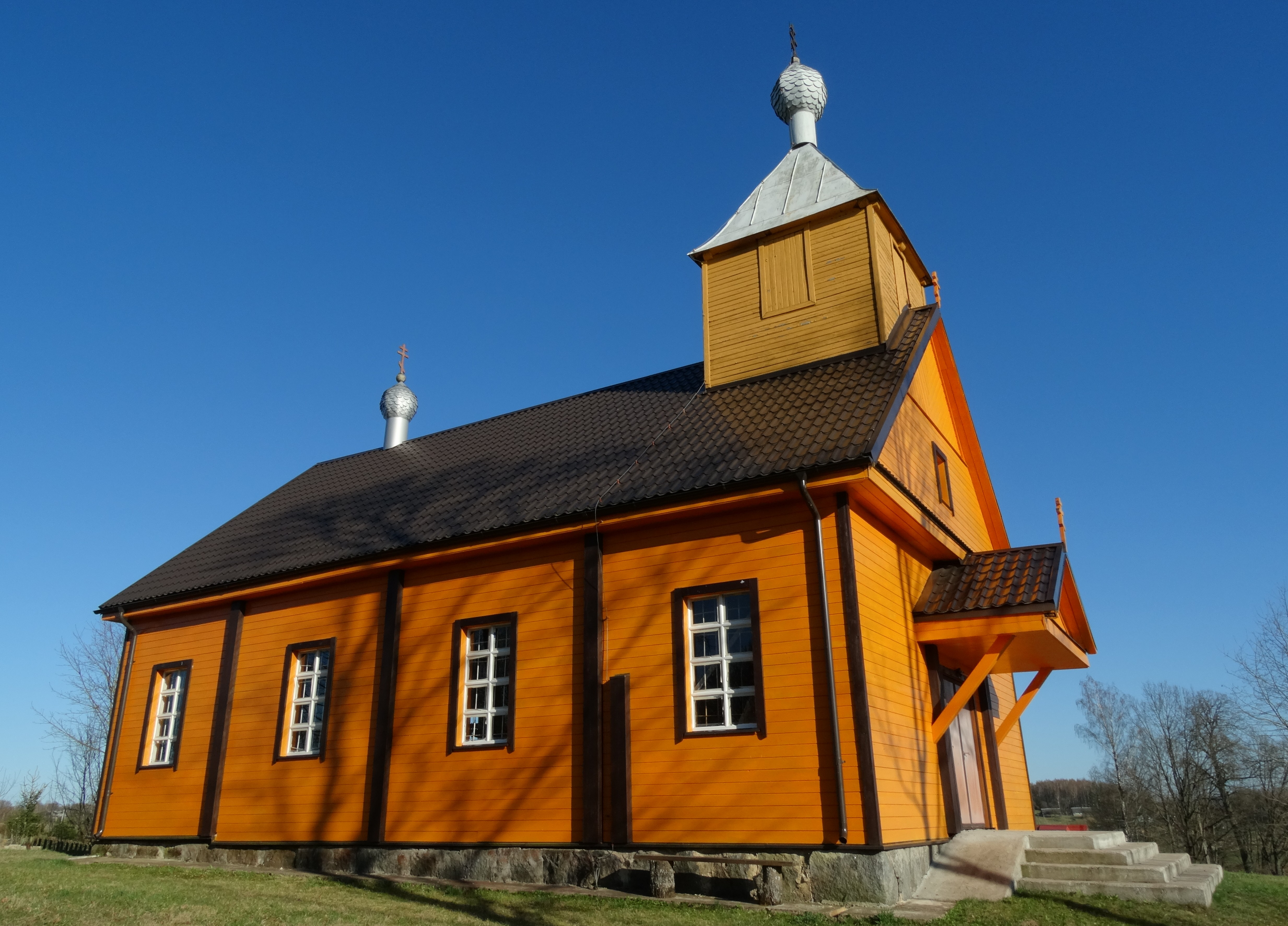
Wooden Old Believers church in Žemaitėliai

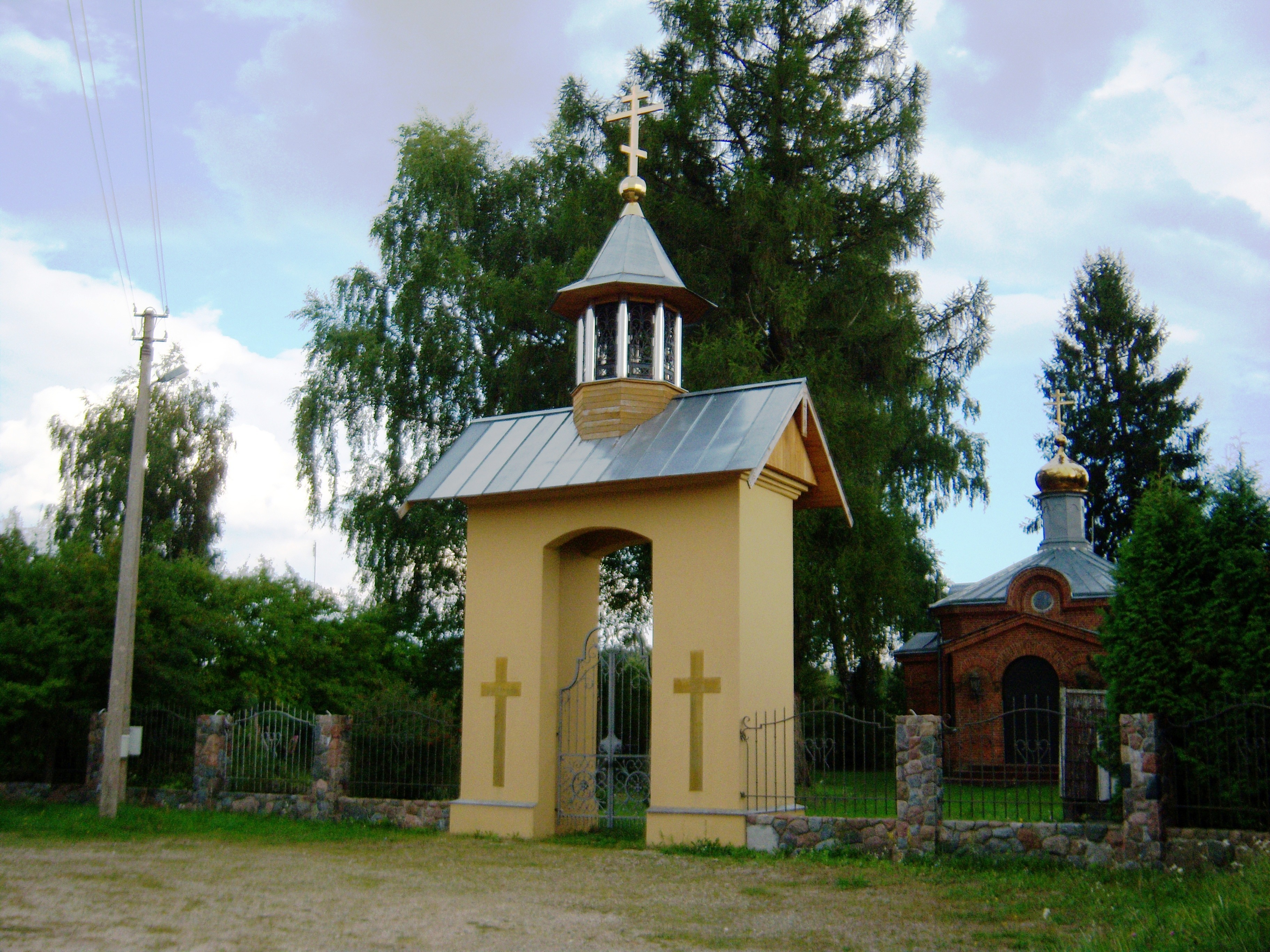
Orthodox church in Geisiškės village

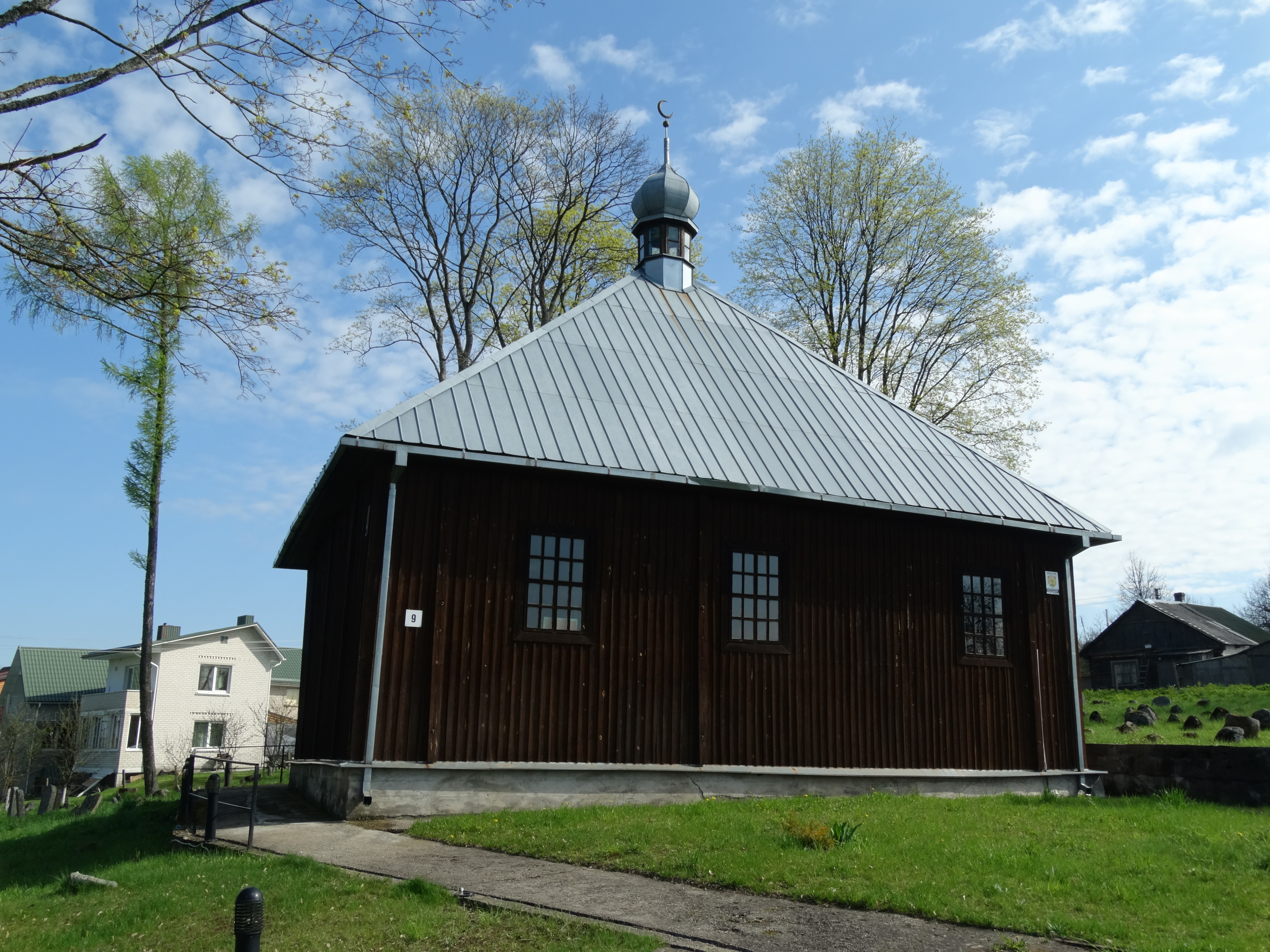
Wooden mosque in Keturiasdešimt Totorių

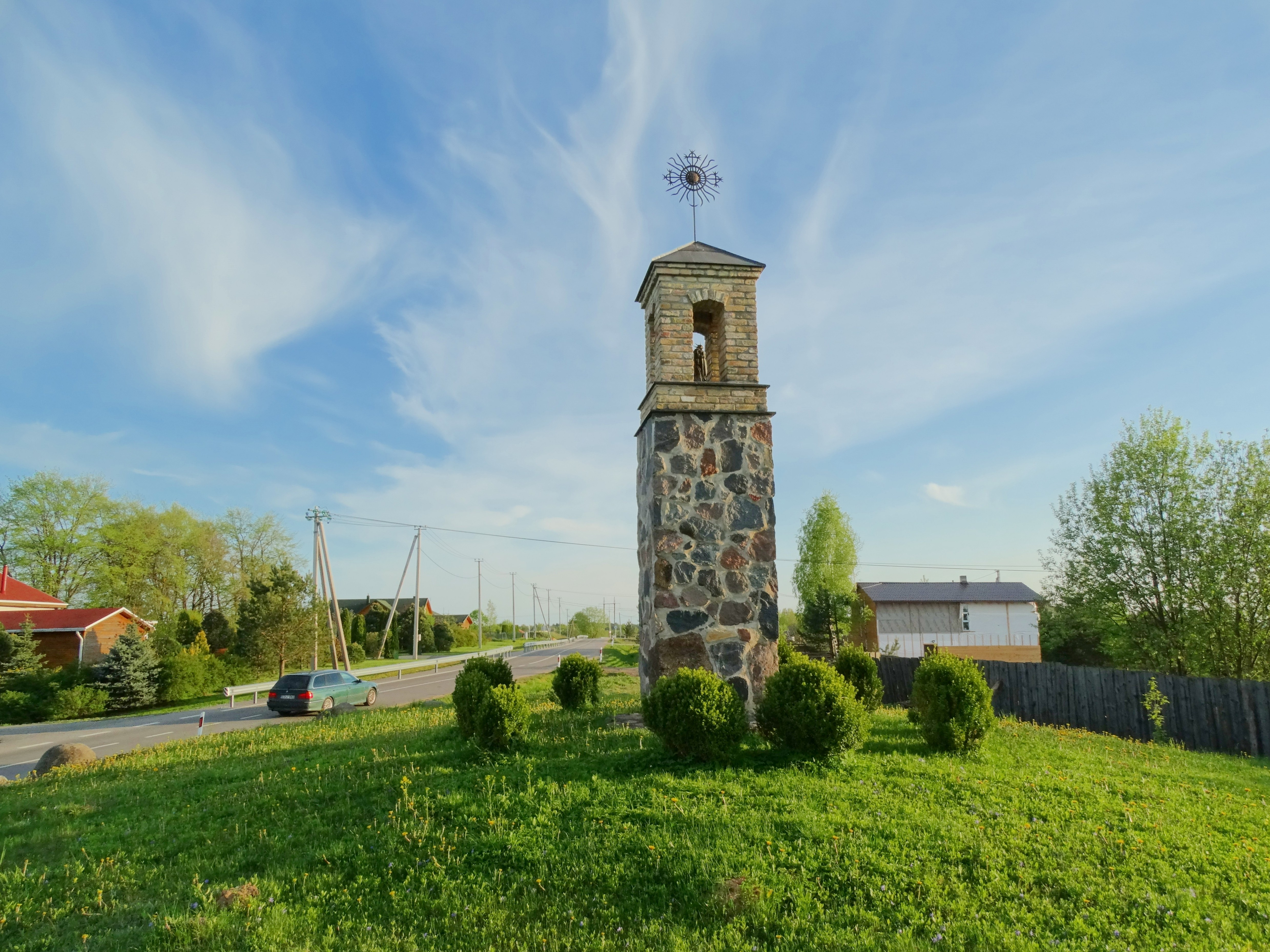
Tower chapel in Sudervė

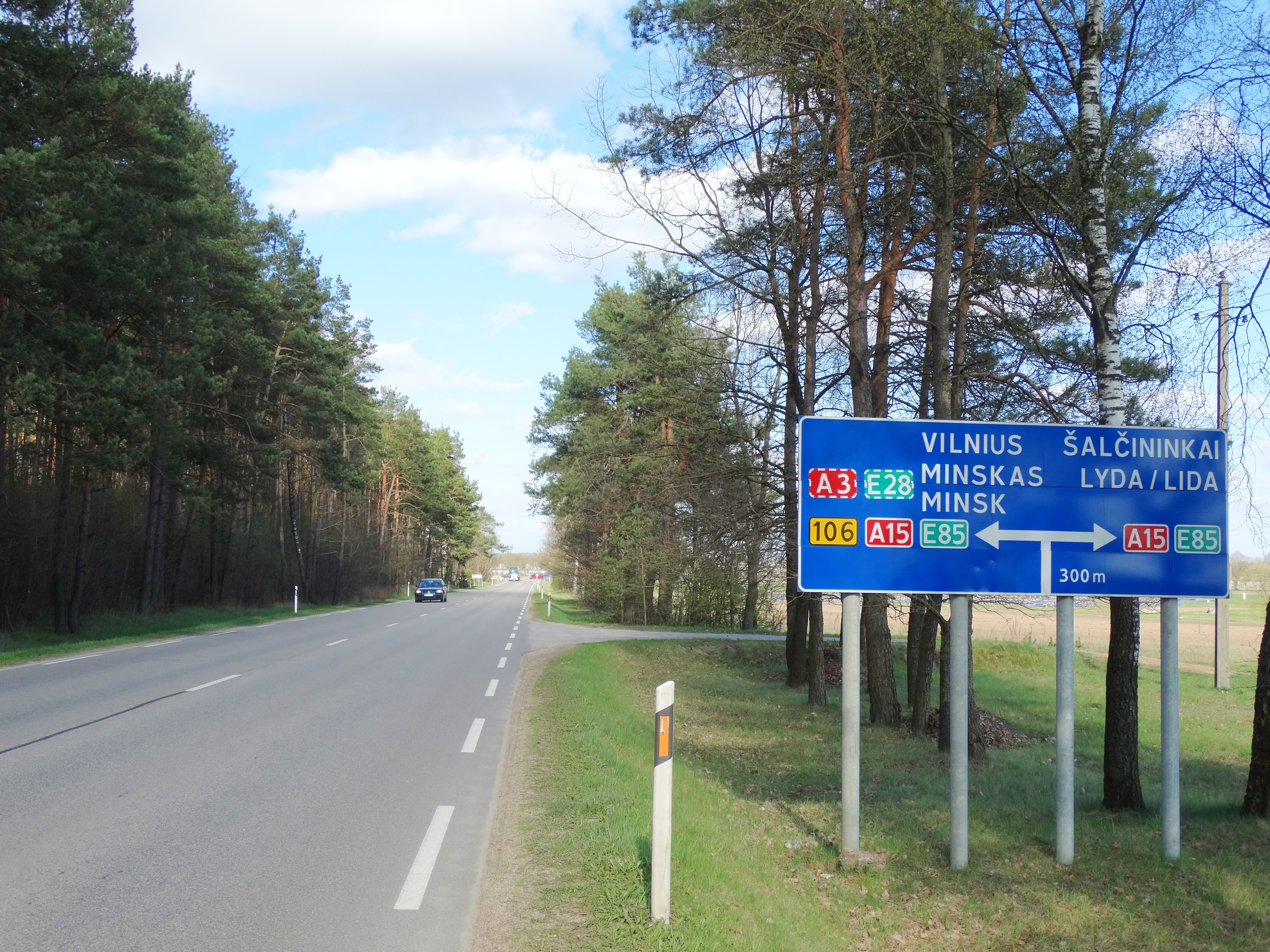
Road near Marijampolis

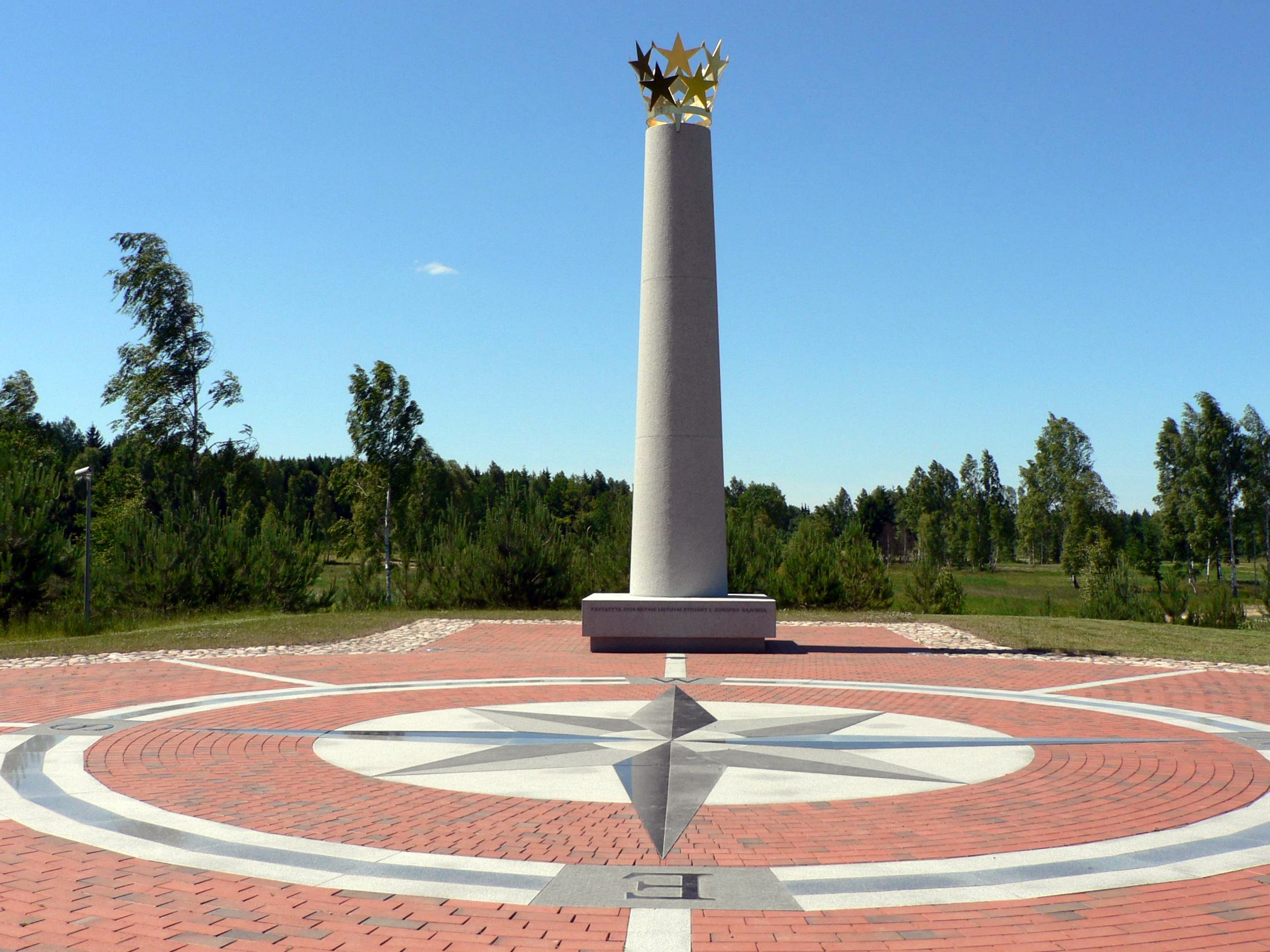
Geographical Center of Europe

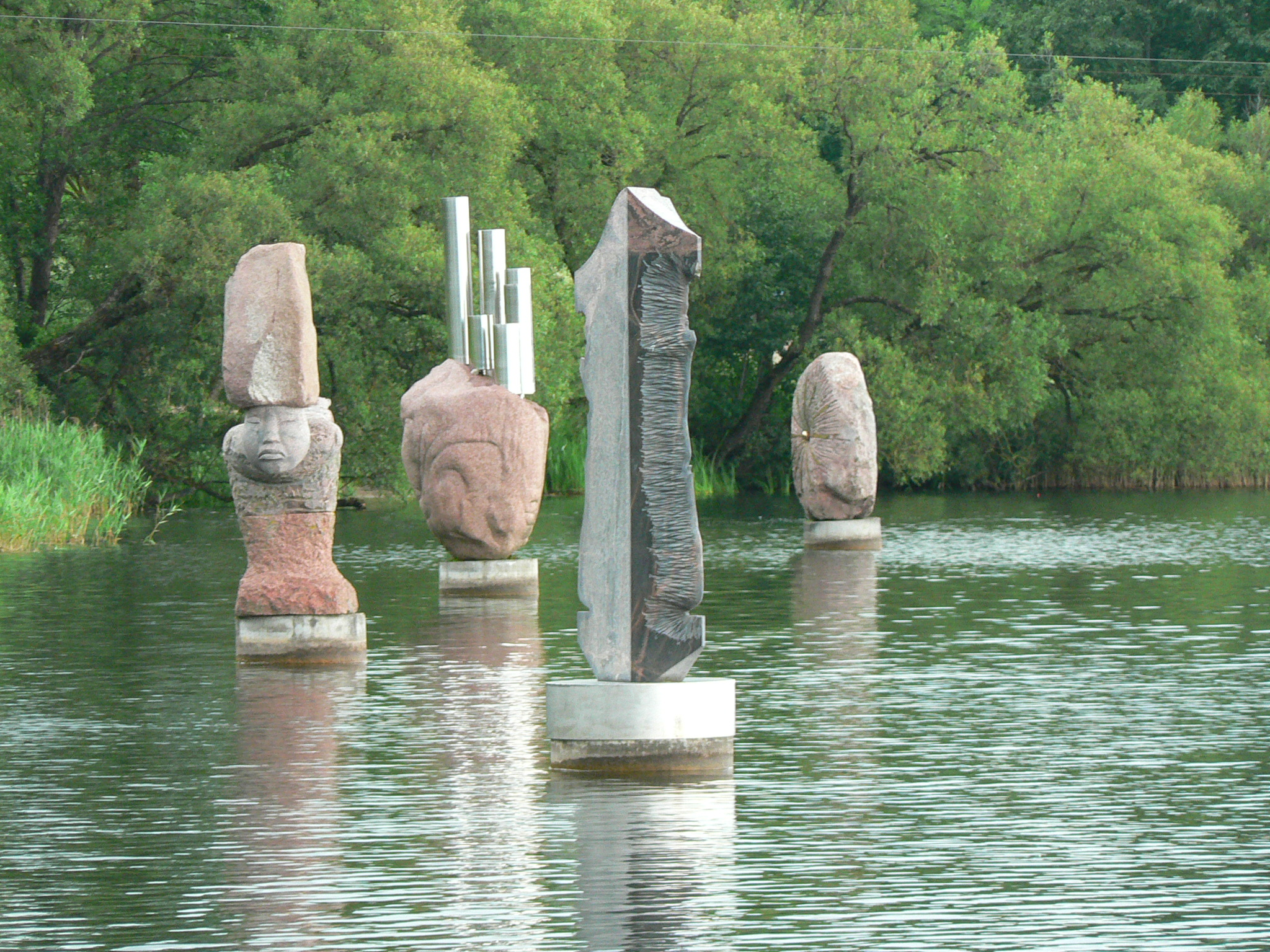
Stone sculptures in Vilnoja lake near Sudervė

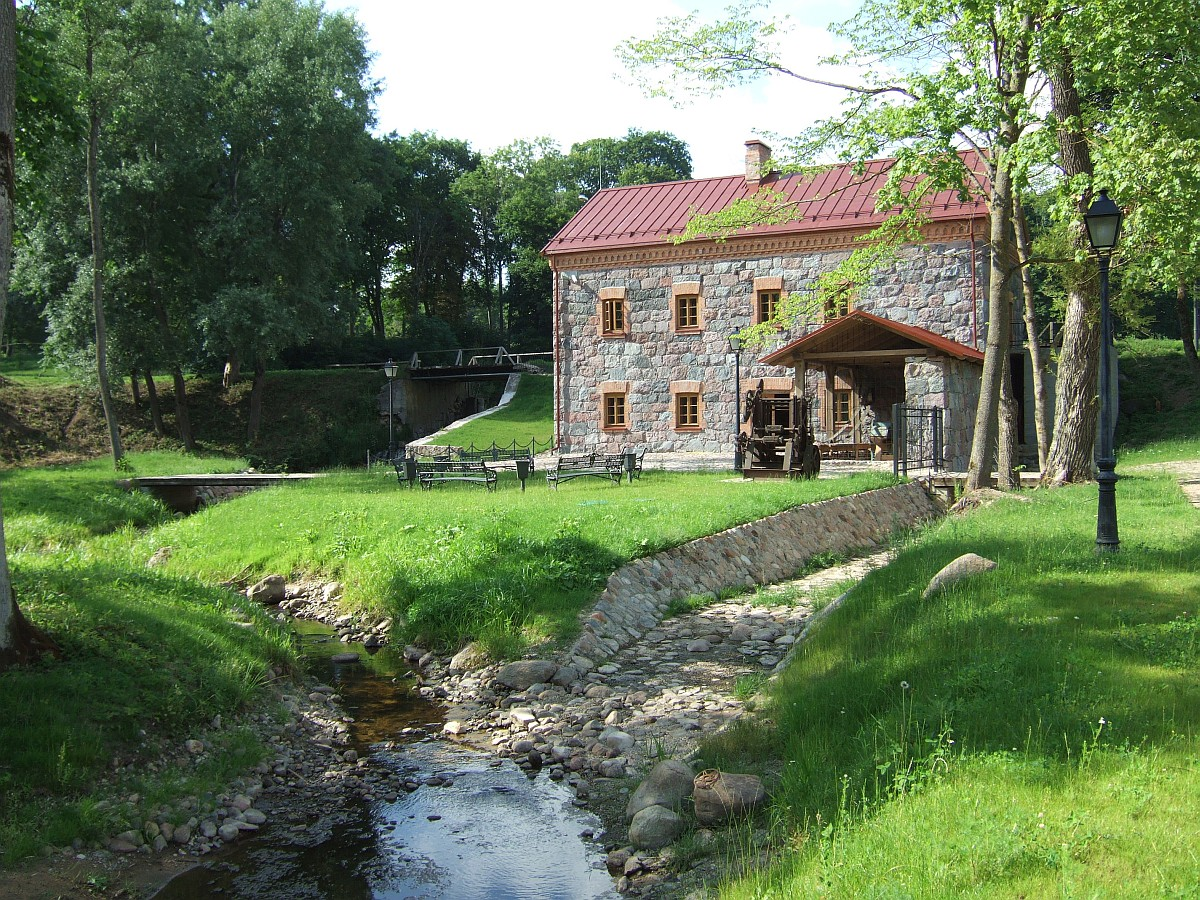
Liubavas mill-museum

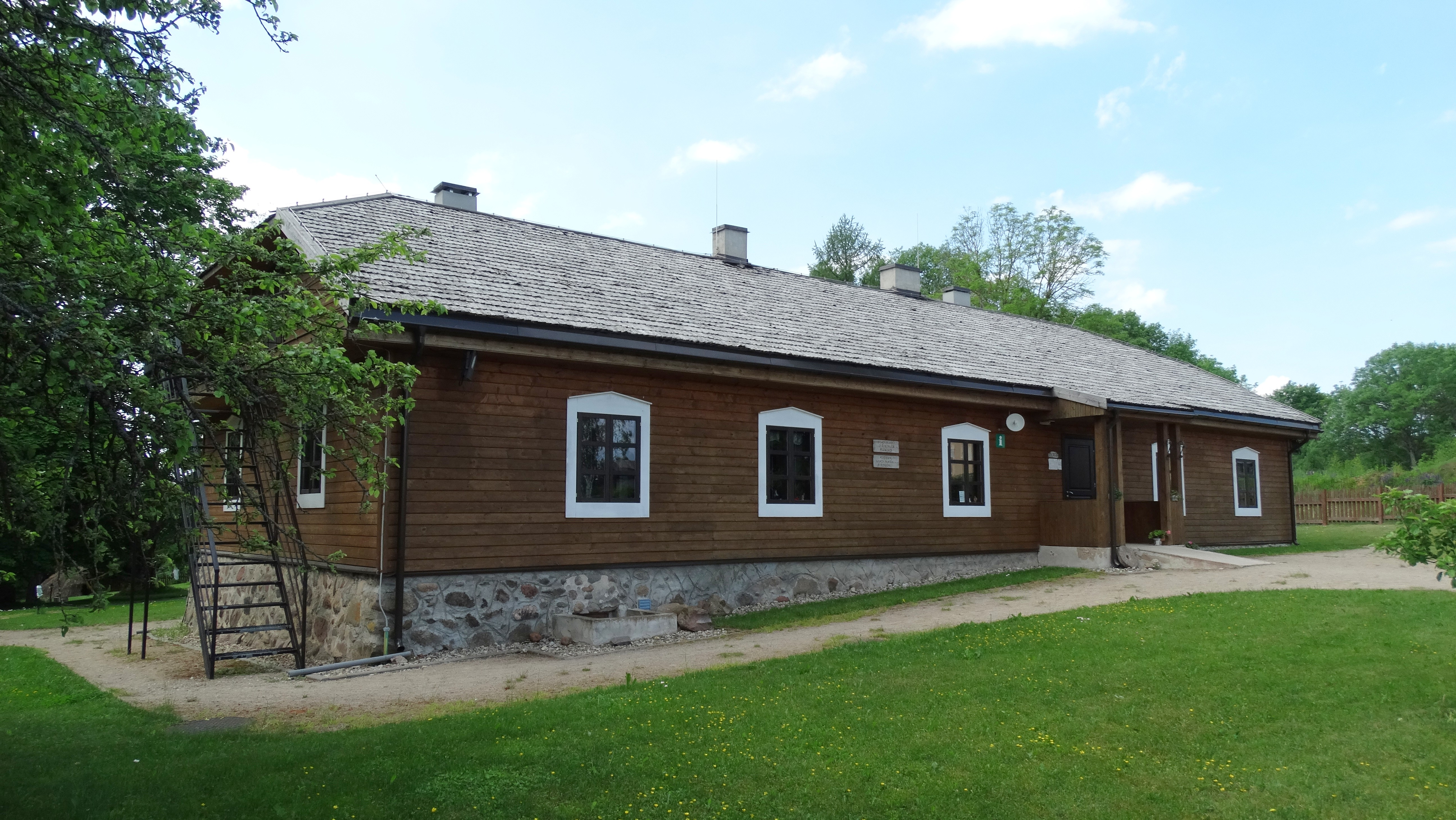
Museum of Władysław Syrokomla in Bareikiškės

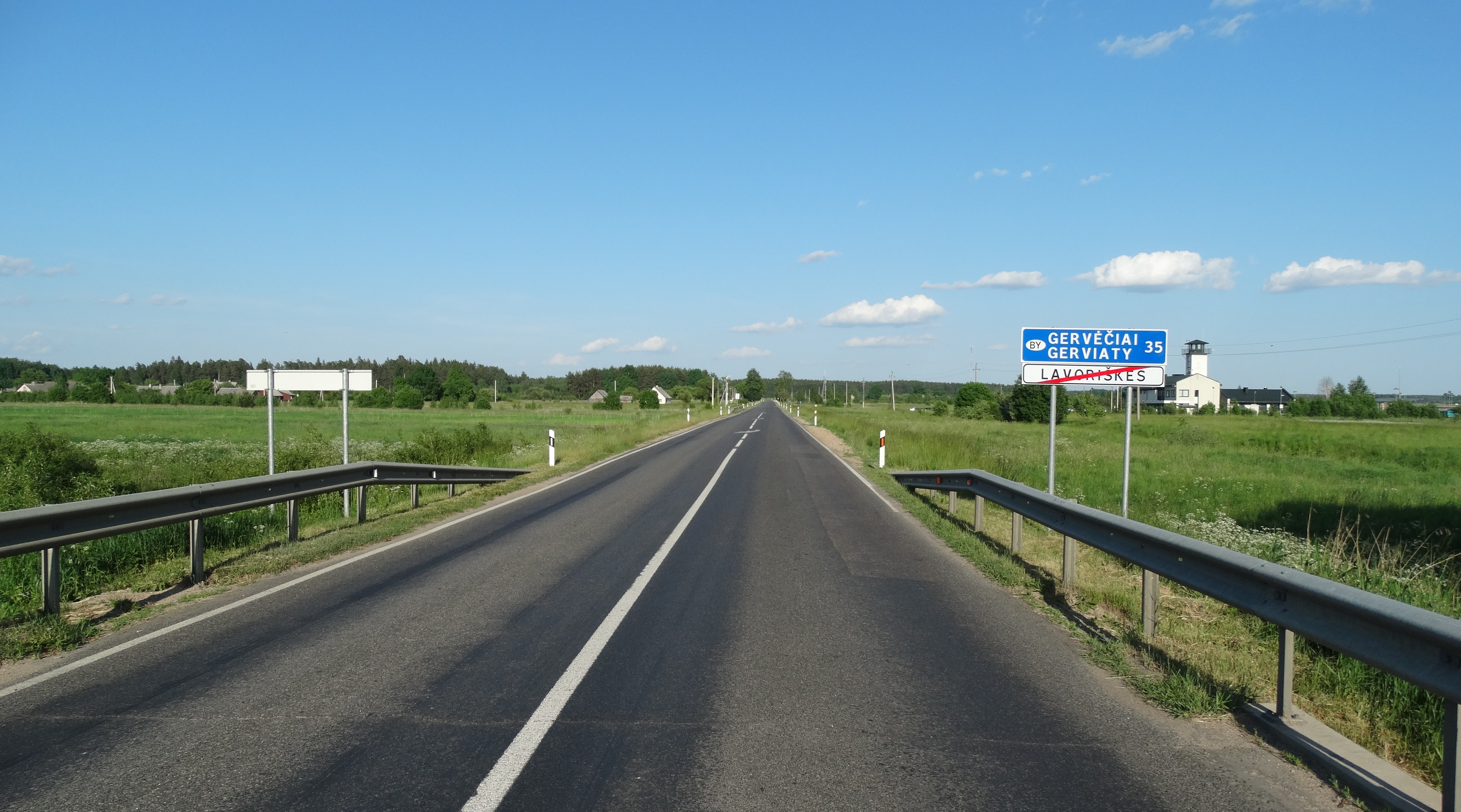
Road near Lavoriškės
