= Kalinas (Lithuania) =

- Village
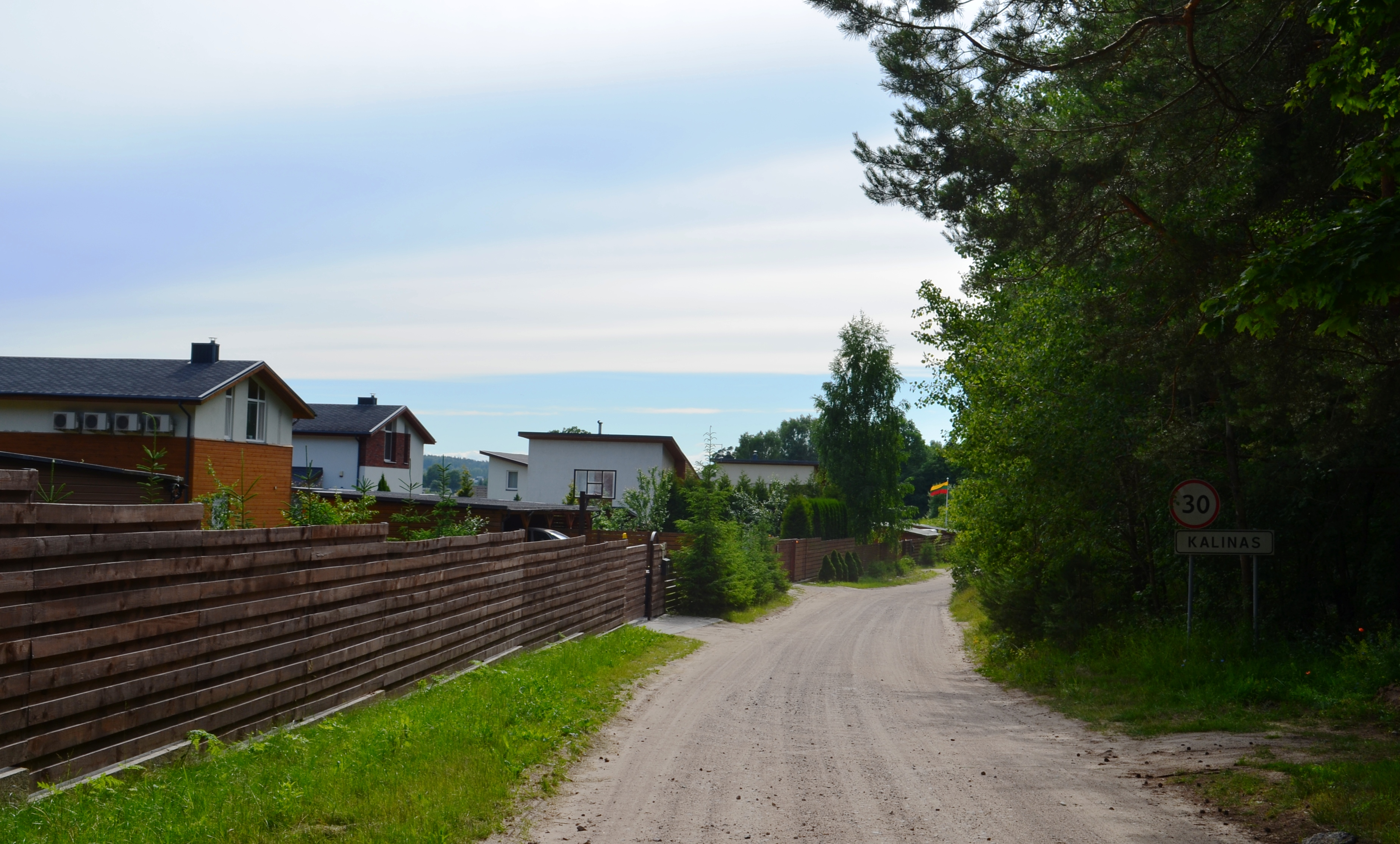

- Location of Kalinas
- Coordinates: 54°48′32″N 25°16′59″E
- Country: Lithuania
- County: Vilnius County
- Municipality: Vilnius district municipality
- Eldership: Riešė Eldership
- Established: 1861

Population (2011)
  - Total: 69
- Time zone: UTC+2 (EET)
  - Summer (DST): UTC+3 (EEST)

Kalinas (Polish: Kalin) is a village in Vilnius District Municipality, Riešė Eldership. It is located 2 kilometers northeast of Didžioji Riešė, by the Riešė river.

== History ==
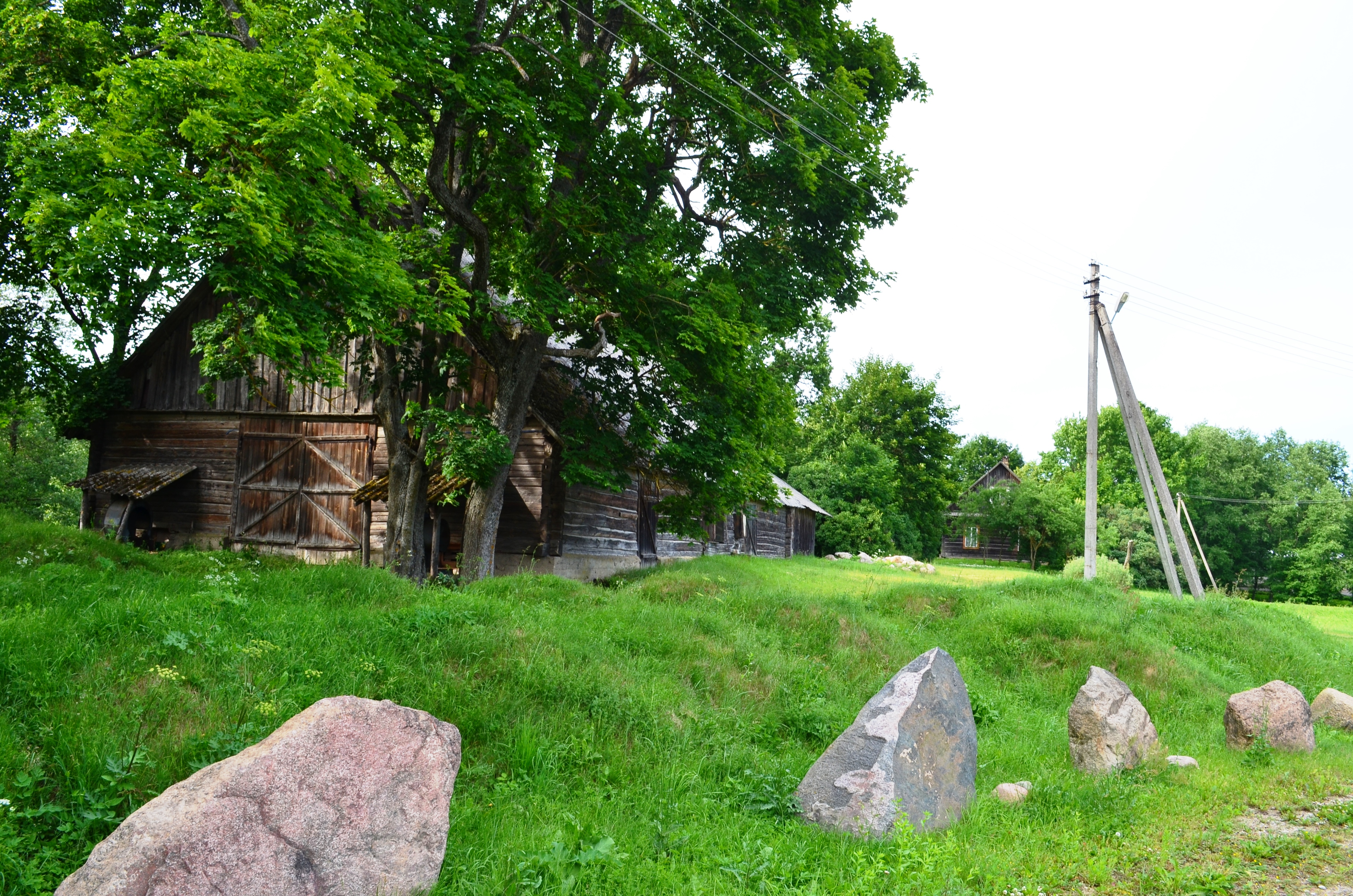
Old homestead in Kalinas.

In 1861, a 200-hectare land in present-day Kalinas was bought by a manor lord and engineer from Vilnius and named Miedziechowszczyzna (Lithuanian: Miedziechovščyzna). Later, the area was renamed to Kalin.

The village was formerly known as Medikiškės, later Kalina.

For a short period during the Soviet occupation, it was a local administrative centre.
