= Mikalojus Tiškevičius =

Lithuanian nobleman

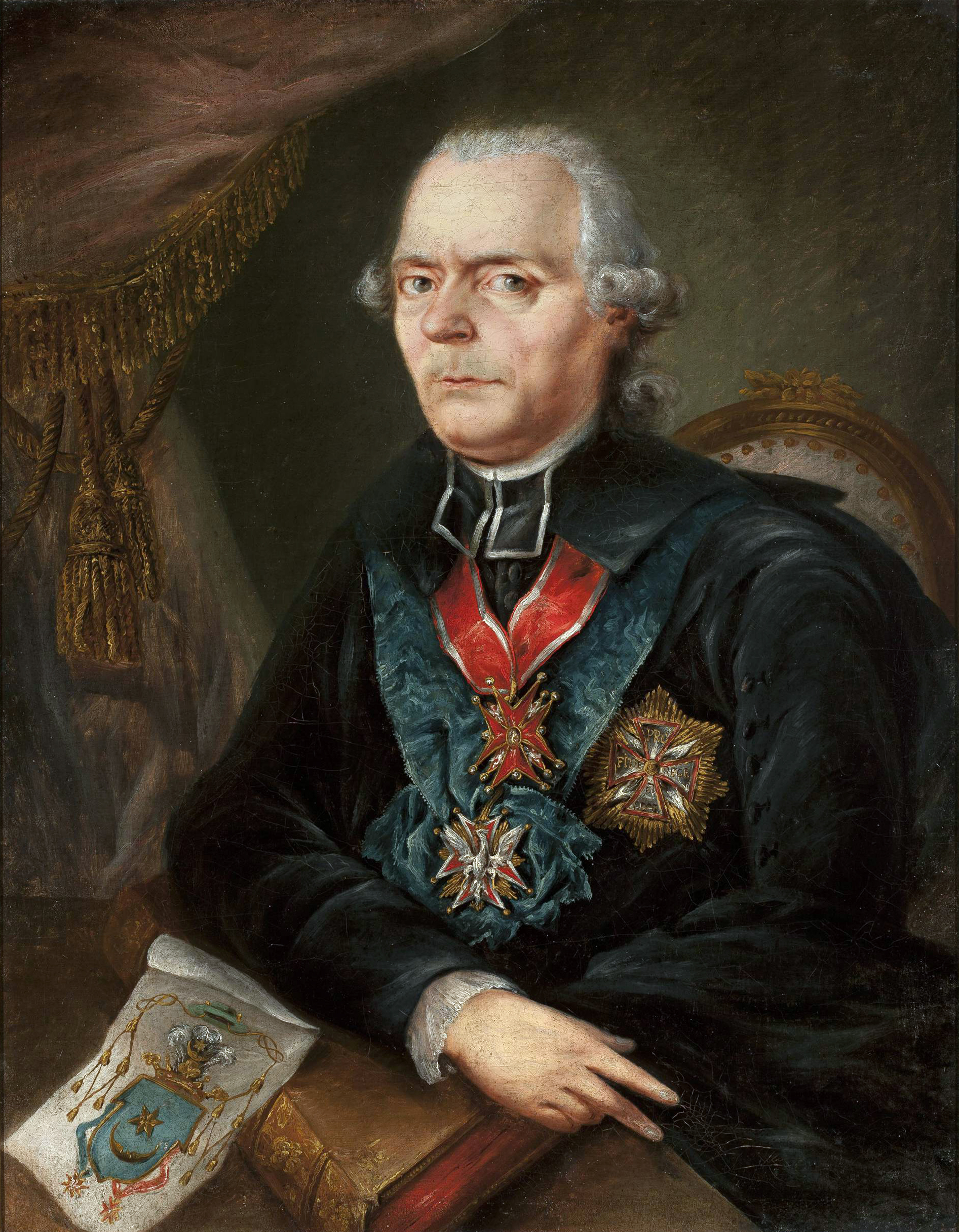
- Portrait of Mikołaj Tyszkiewicz
- Born: 1721
- Died: 6 December 1796 (aged 74–75); Vilnius, Grand Duchy of Lithuania
- Parent(s): Michał Jan Tyszkiewicz Łohojski, Regina Larska

Mikalojus Tiškevičius (1721 – 6 December 1796 in Vilnius) was a boyar, nobleman, Graf of the Leliwa coat of arms, canon, state and military figure of the Grand Duchy of Lithuania and the Polish–Lithuanian Commonwealth. He owned the Liubavas Manor in Liubavas, in the northern part of Vilnius.
