= Riešė Eldership =

Riešė Eldership Riešės seniūnija
- Eldership
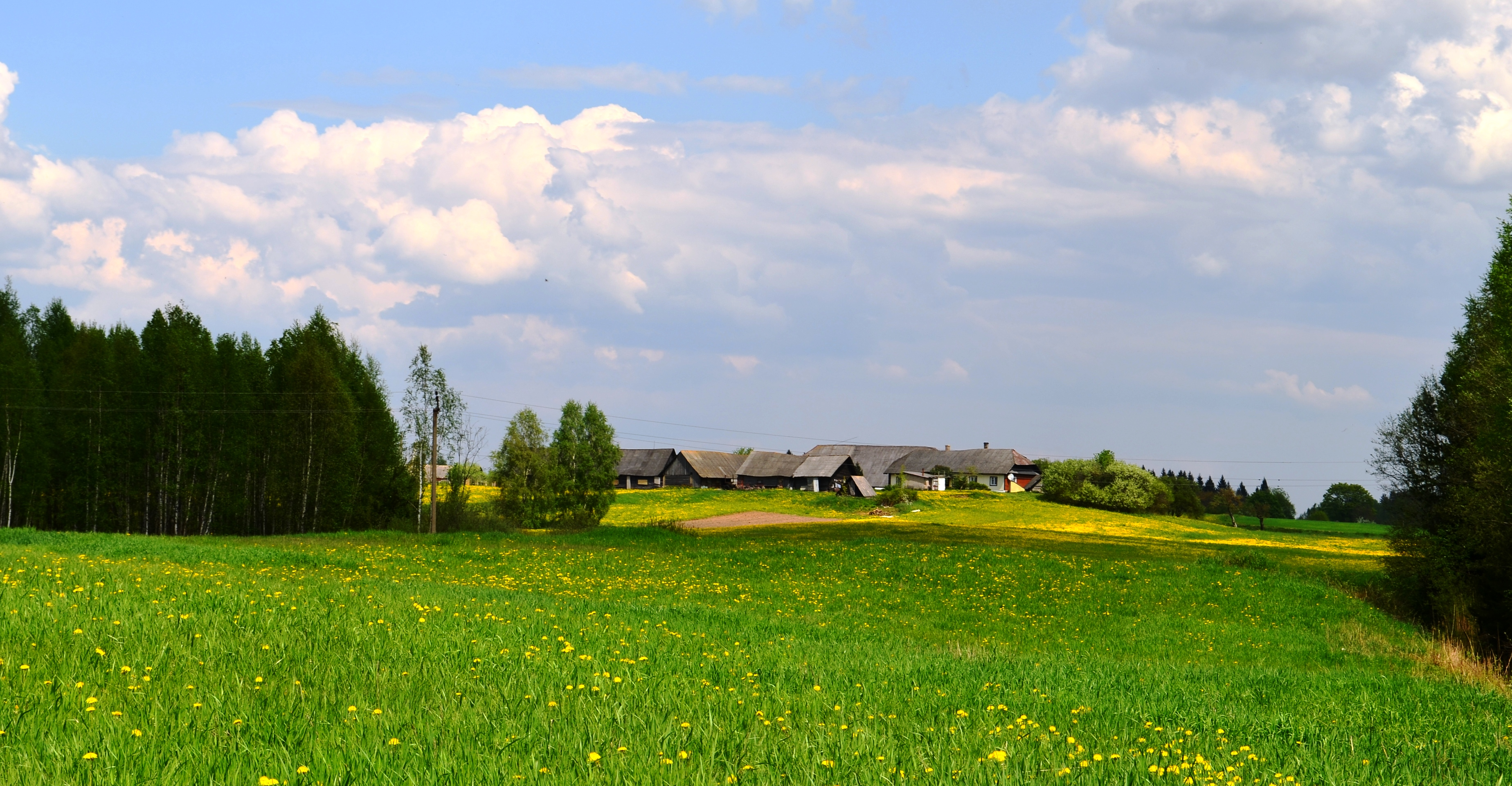
- Landscape near Žudiškės

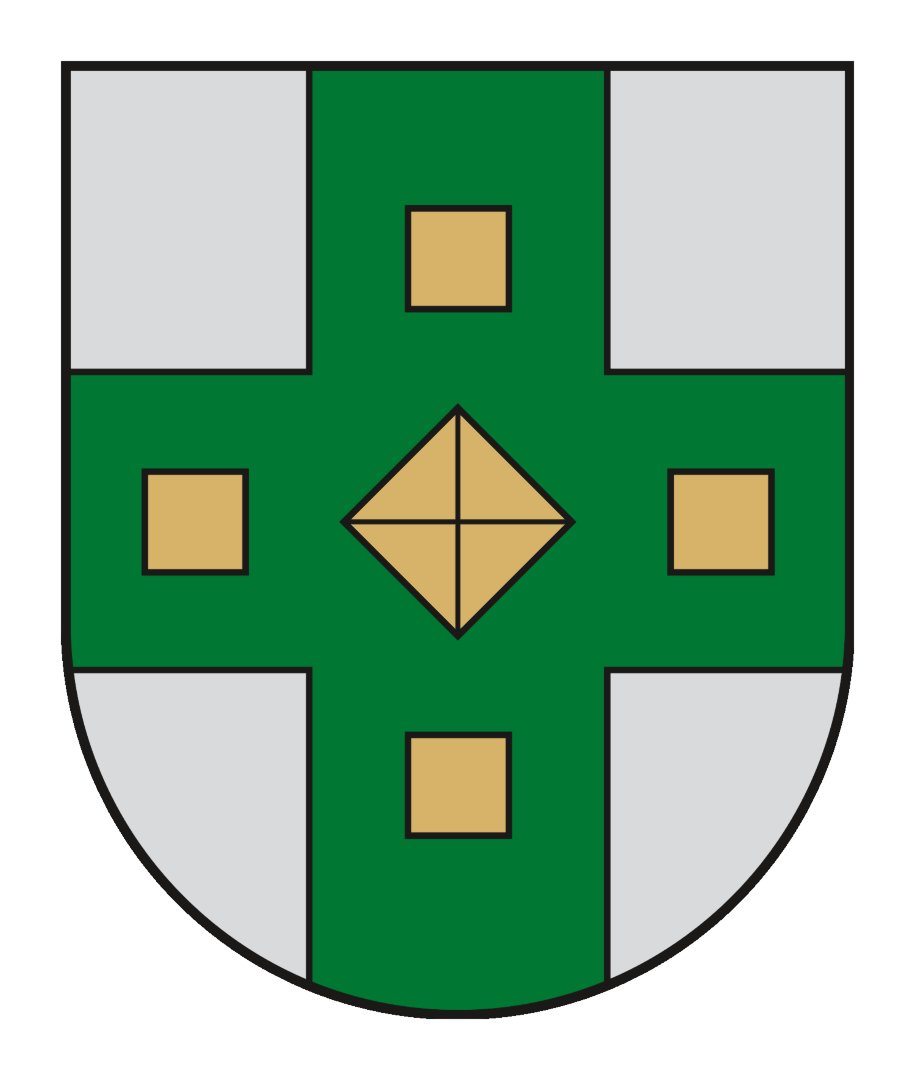
- Coat of arms

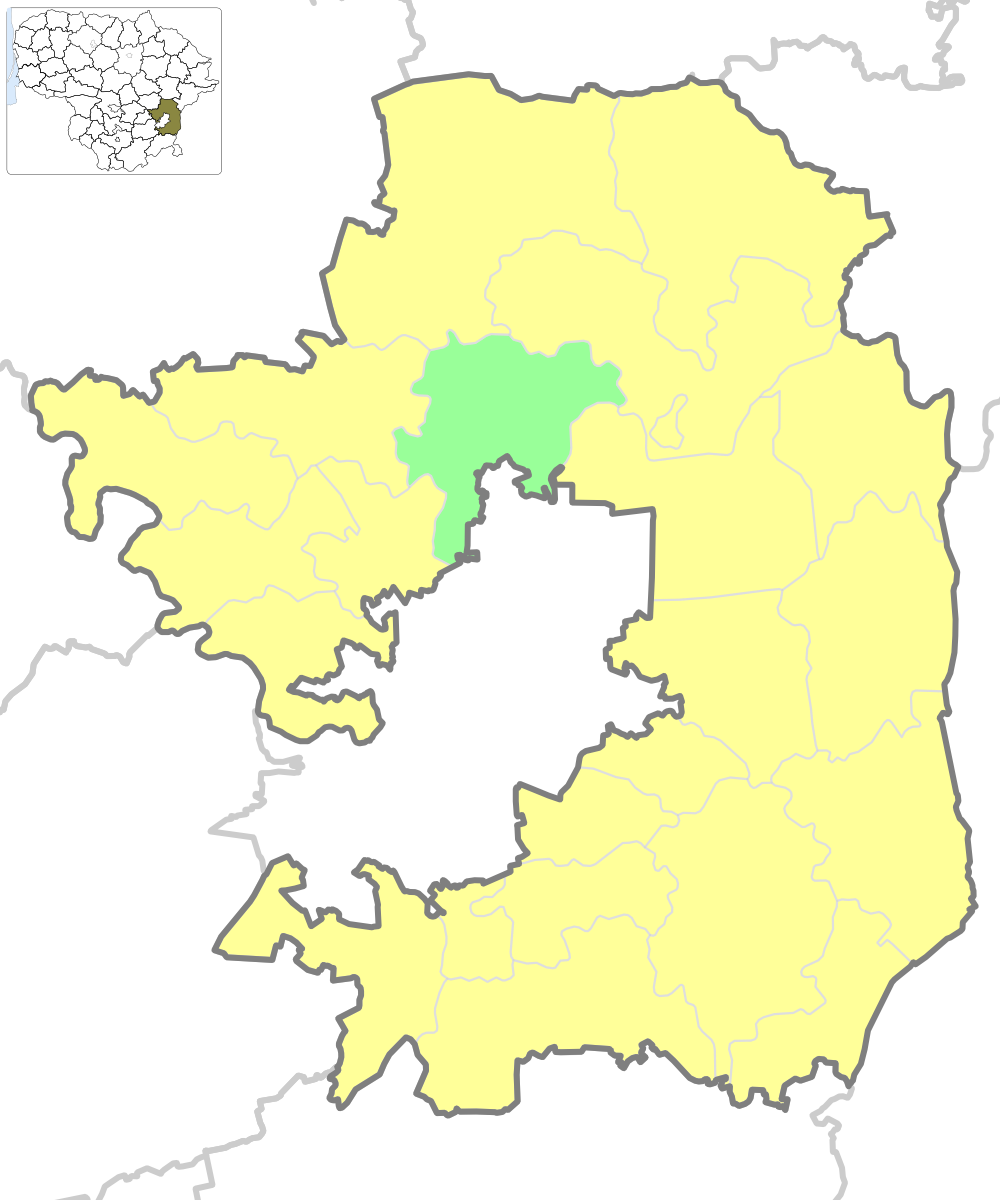
- Location of Riešė eldership
- Country: Lithuania
- Ethnographic region: Dzūkija
- County: Vilnius County
- Municipality: Vilnius District Municipality
- Administrative centre: Didžioji Riešė

Government
  - district administrator: Valdemar Rynkevič

Area
  - Total: 103.76 km^{2} (40.06 sq mi)

Population
  - Total: 6,498
  - Density: 62.63/km^{2} (162.2/sq mi)
- Time zone: UTC+2 (EET)
  - Summer (DST): UTC+3 (EEST)
- Website: https://www.vrsa.lt

Riešė Eldership (Lithuanian: Riešės seniūnija) is an eldership in Lithuania, located in Vilnius District Municipality, north of Vilnius.

== History ==
In 1867, a 9th-10th century Dirham treasure minted by Abbasid and Saffarid nobility was found in Riešė. Lands and manor in the eldership were historically known since 16th century, when they belonged to the Vilnius Chapter. In 1681, the mansion was given rights to build a bridge across Riešė River and collect tolls.

18th-century saw the construction of Pikeliškės Manor. In 19th century, Riešė was the center of a volost. In 1939, a brick church was built in Didžioji Riešė.

In 2017, the official coat-of-arms of Riešė Eldership was approved by a presidential decree.

== Geography ==
The area is predominantly hilly and is situated in the Riešė Upland. Most landscapes, especially on the southern side, are undergoing rapid urbanization. The eldership is crossed by the Riešė River and reaches the Neris River to the east. There are several lakes, of which the largest is Lake Pikeliškės. Swamps and bogs can also be found.

There are 45 villages and 25 homesteads located within the eldership, the largest of which is Didžioji Riešė (2,520 inhabitants). Other villages include Pikeliškės, Skirgiškės, Raudondvaris, Ažulaukė and Jadvygiškės.

== Notable places ==
- Pikeliškės Manor - a former residential manor, summer residence of Józef Piłsudski.
- Riešė Church of St. Bishop Stanislaus - a historicist 1939 Catholic church.
- Europos Parkas (Park of Europe) - an open-air museum located in the geographical center of Europe.
- Raudondvaris Manor, stables and farmhouses
- Former Žudiškės Manor farmstead
- Ancient settlement of Karveliškės
- Ancient settlement of Užužerė
- Ancient settlement of Verbiškės
- Ancient settlements of Miškiniai
- Jewish massacre site and grave near Joneikiškės
- Stone of Mikulionys
- Oak of Žudiškės
- Raudonoji Bala Telmological Reserve
- Vanaginė Geomorphological Reserve

== Ethnic composition ==
According to 2021 National Census data, out of 6386 inhabitants:

- Lithuanians - 64.5% (4117)
- Poles - 25.4% (1621)
- Russians - 5.6% (360)

According to 2011 National Census data, the ethnic composition is as follows:

- Lithuanians - 59.2%
- Poles - 30.4%
- Russians - 6.1%

== Gallery ==
Riešė Eldership administration building in Didžioji Riešė

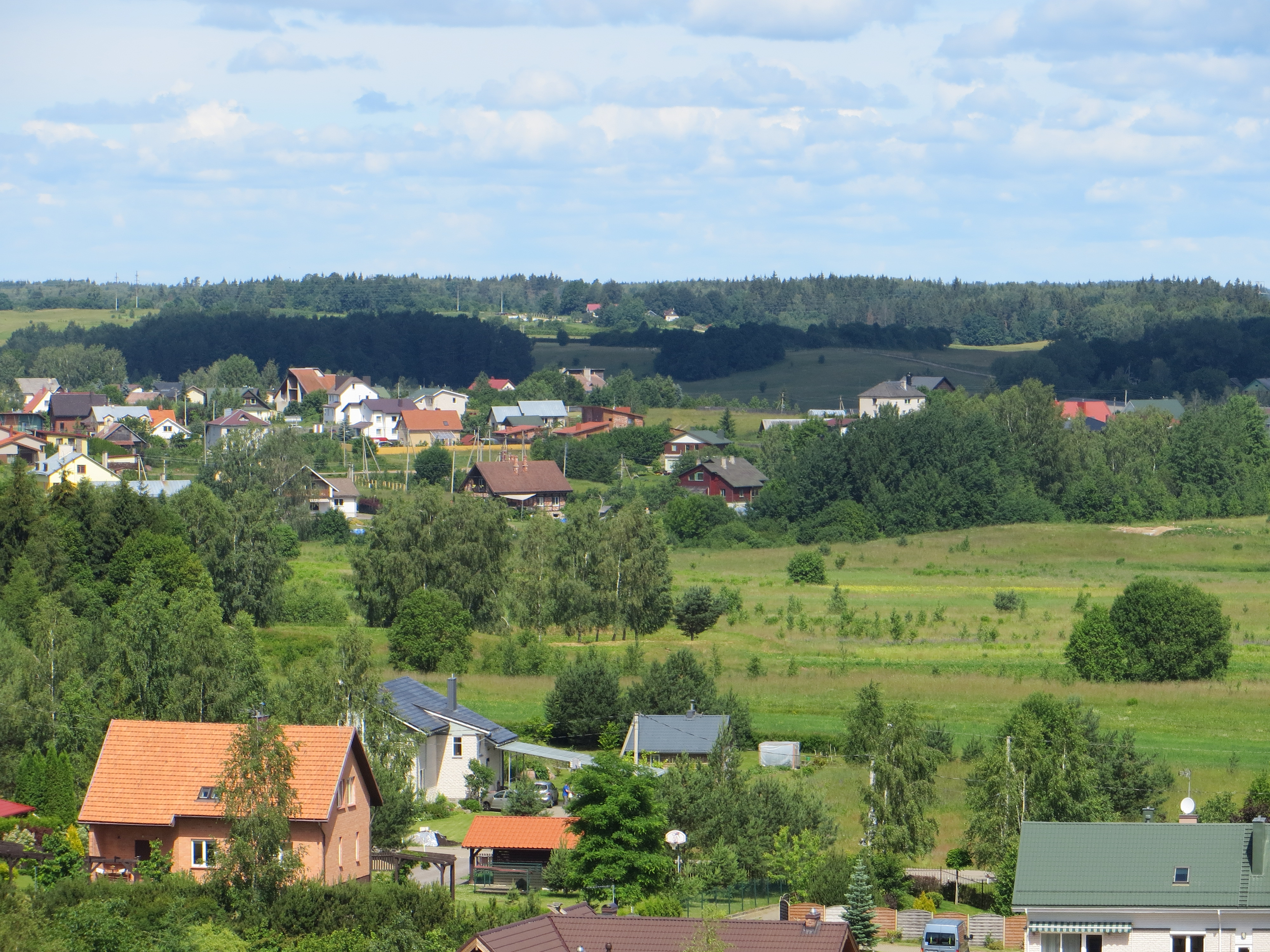
Didžioji Riešė

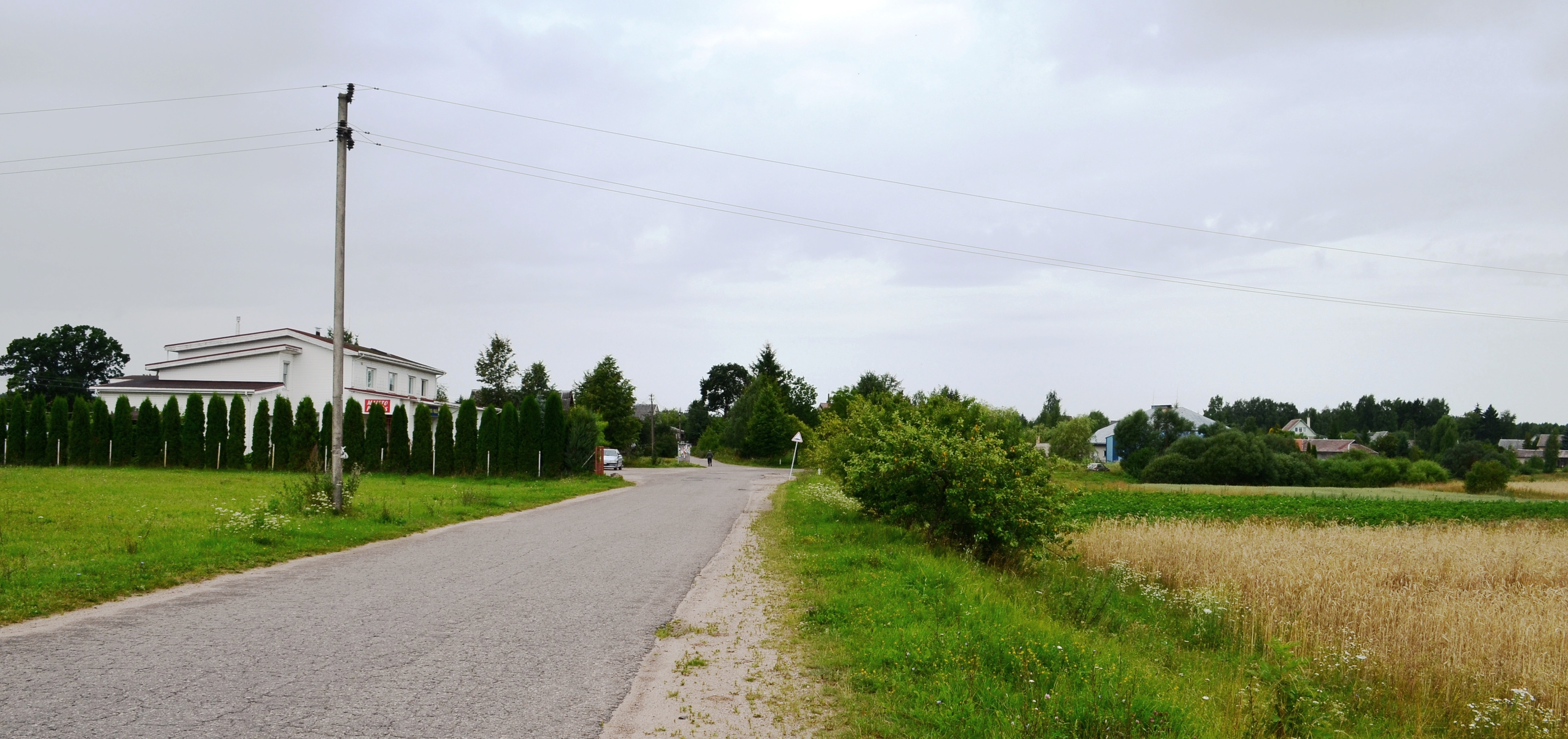
Pikeliškės

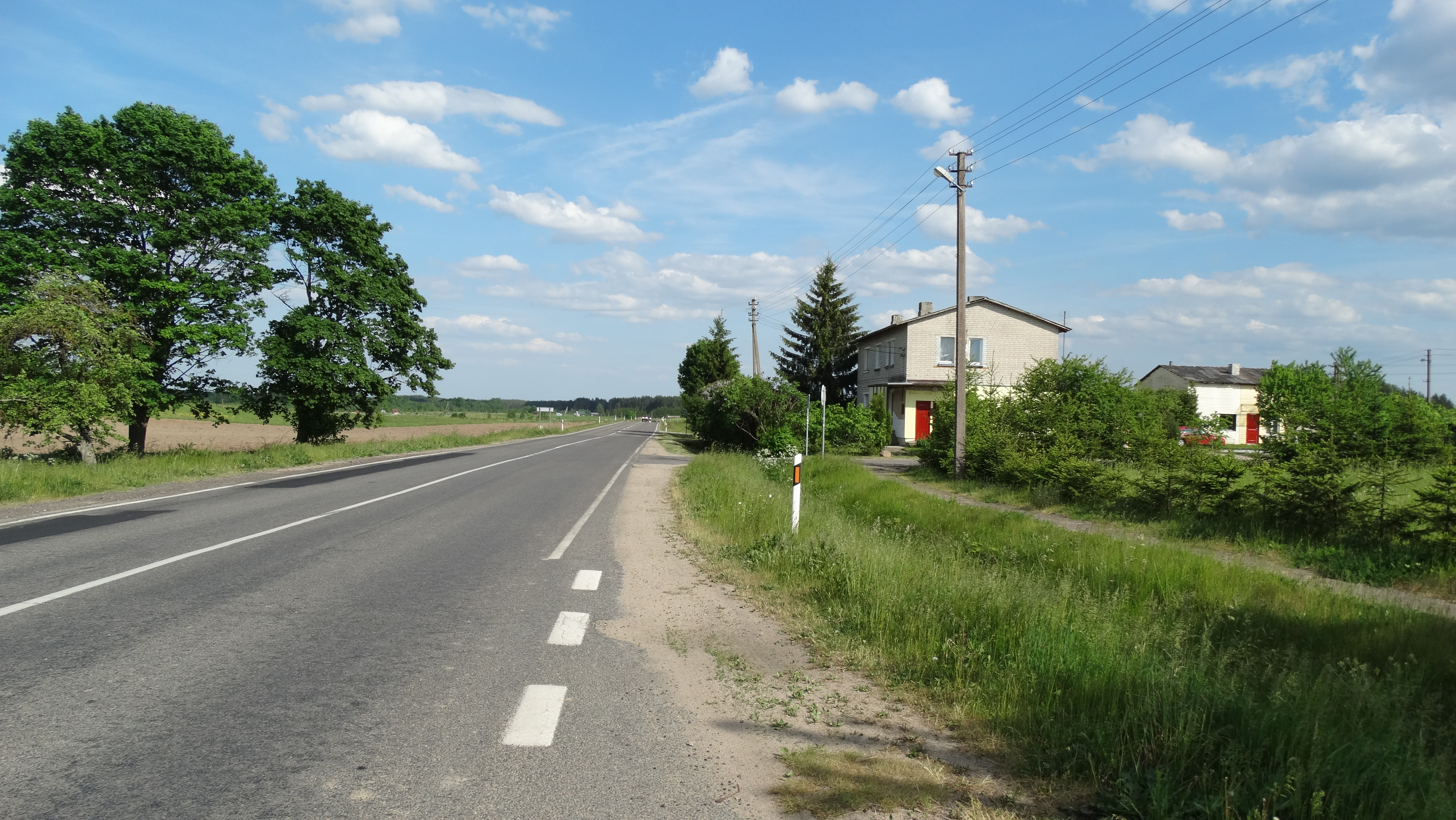
Ažulaukės

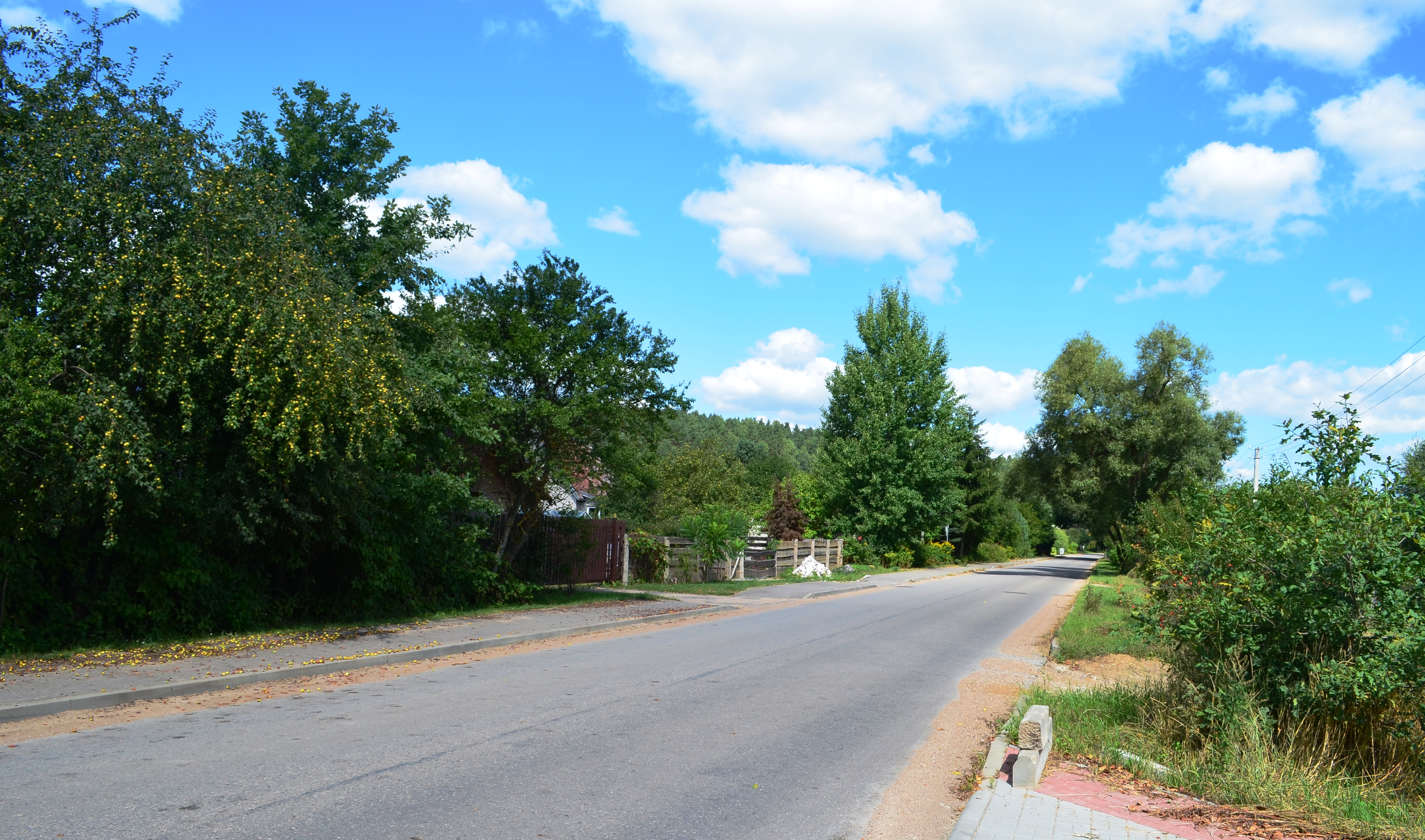
Skirgiškės

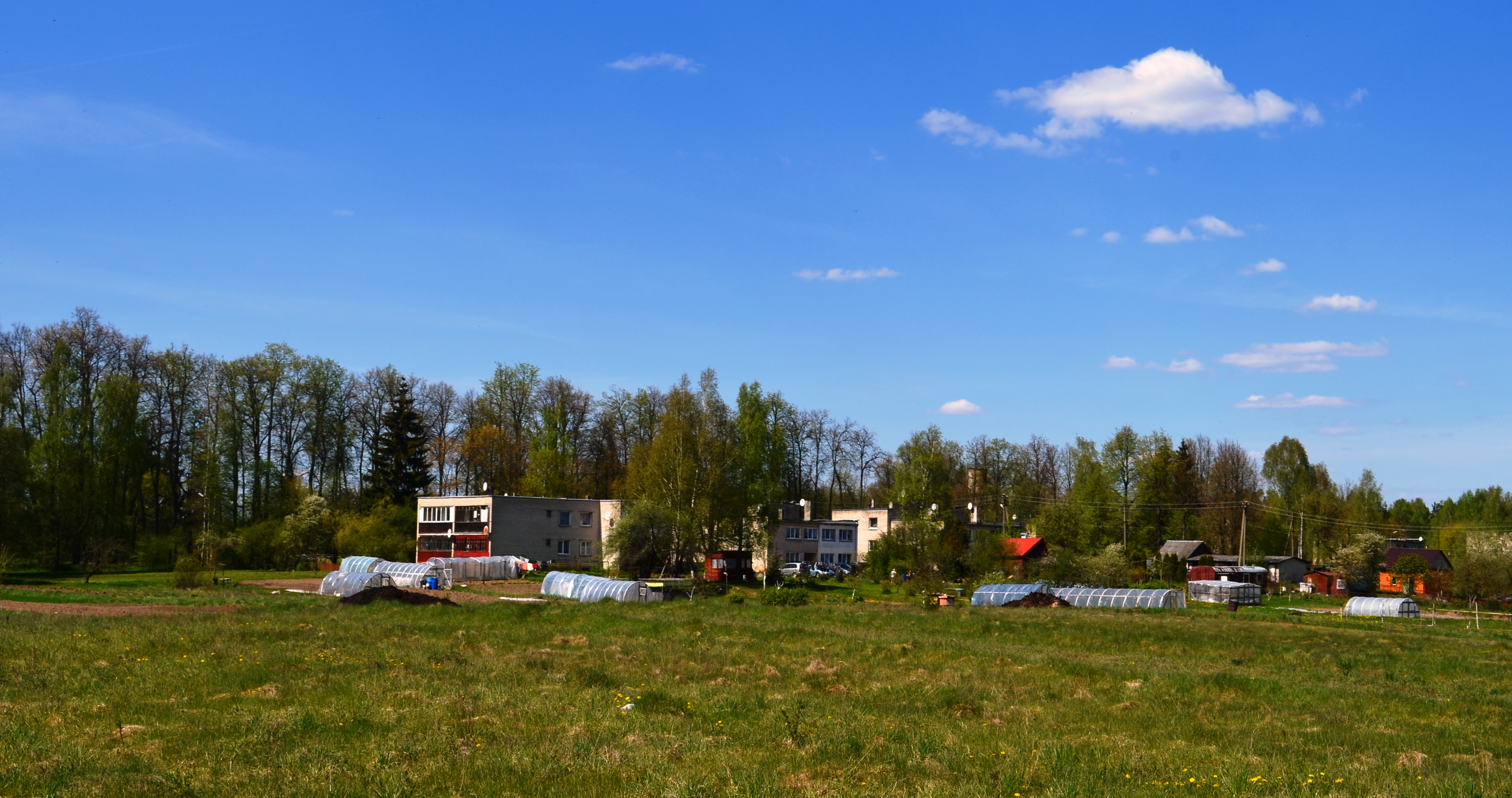
Raudondvaris

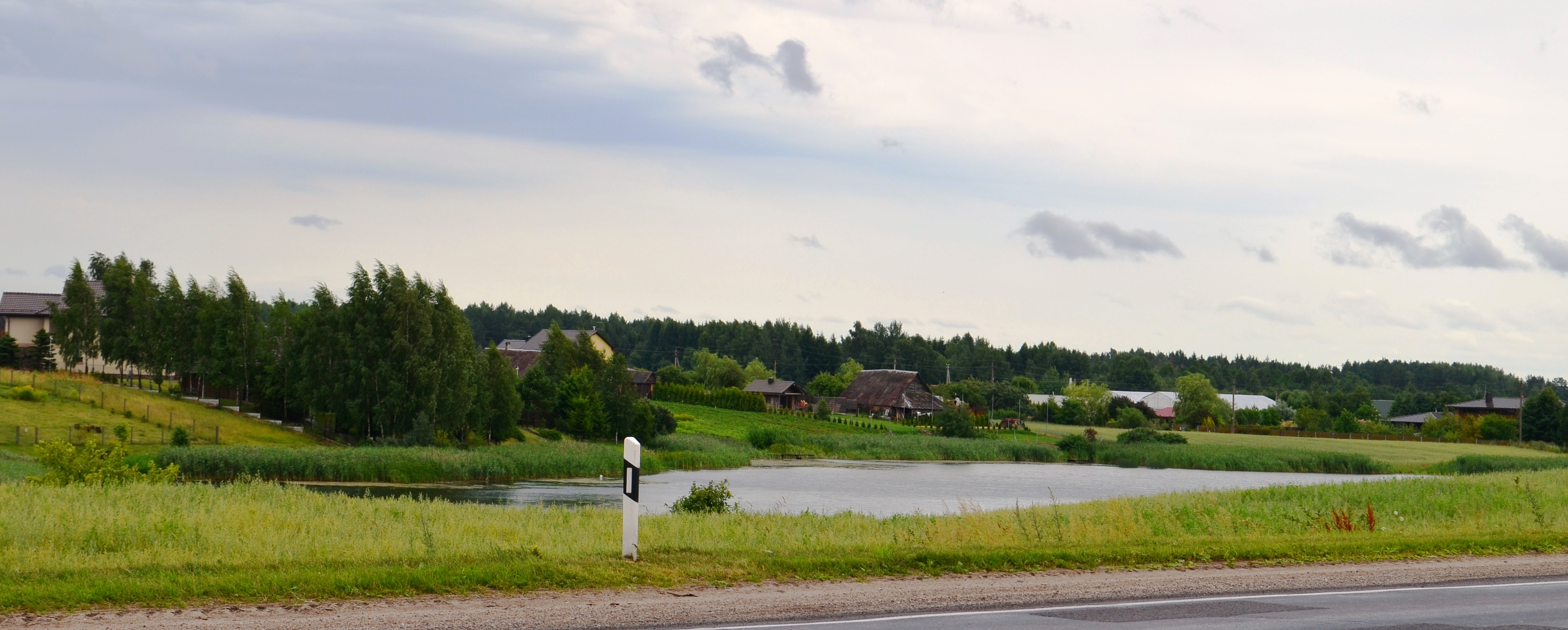
Jadvygiškės

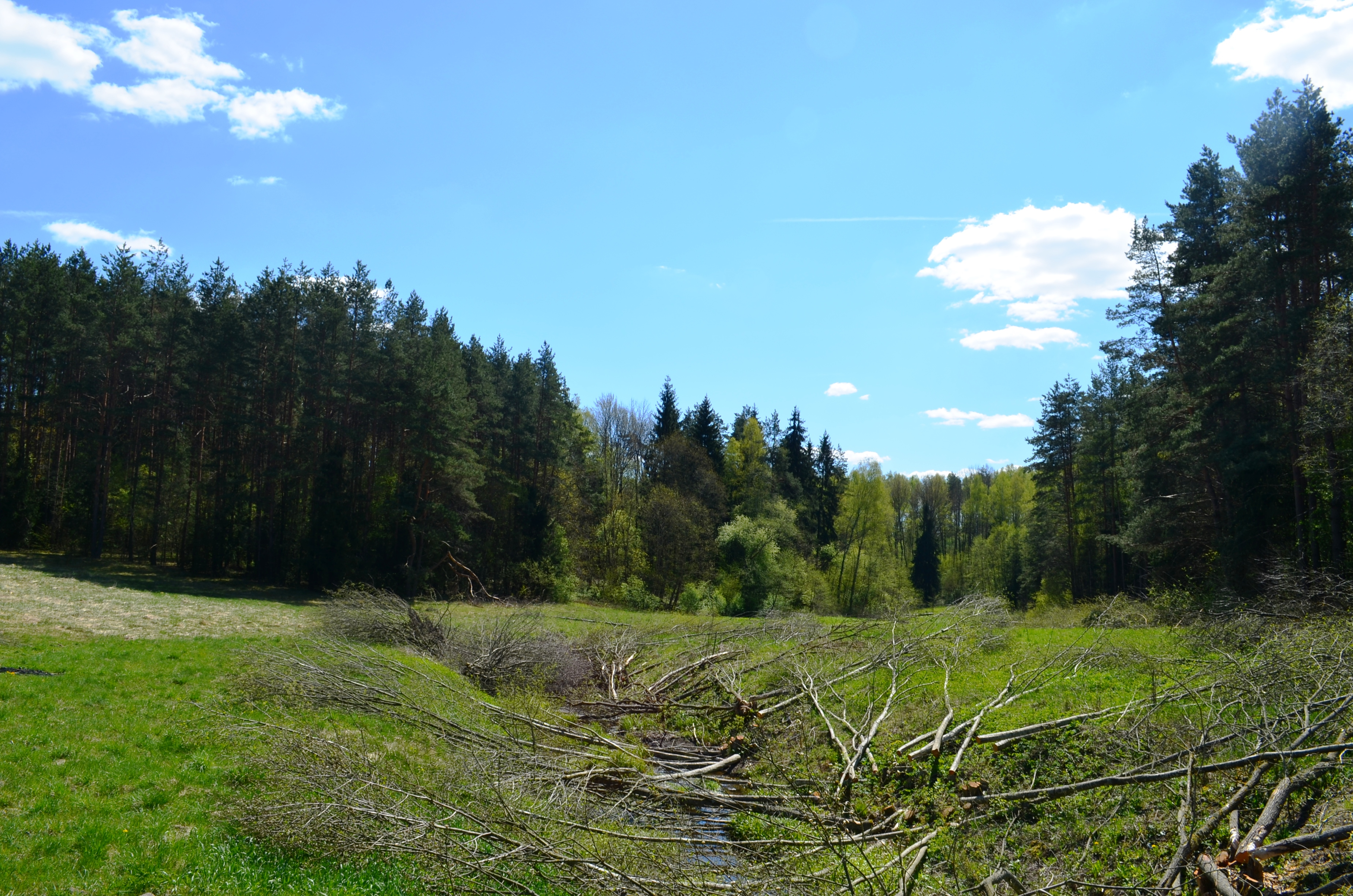
Landscape near Avietynė

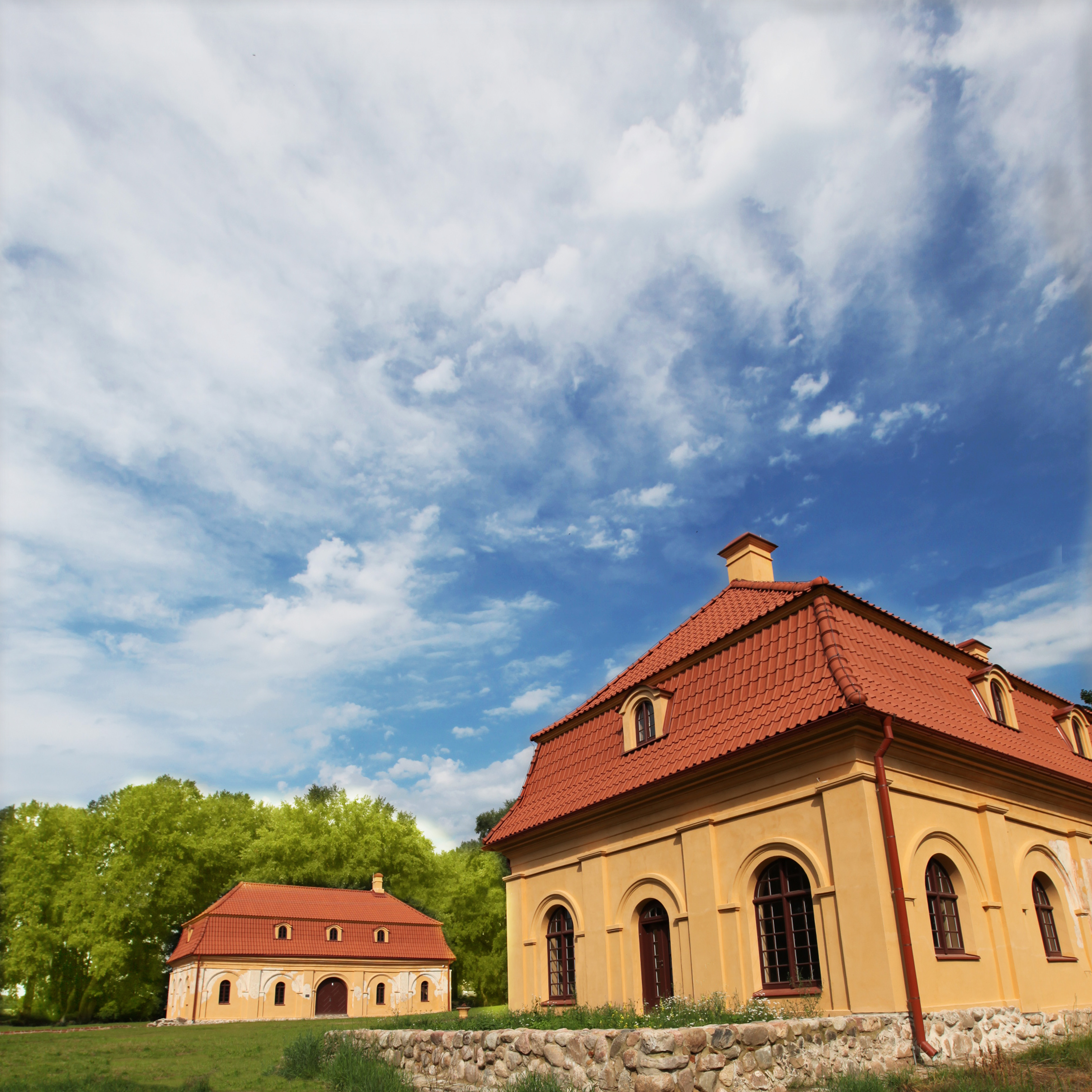
Liubavas Manor orangery and officine

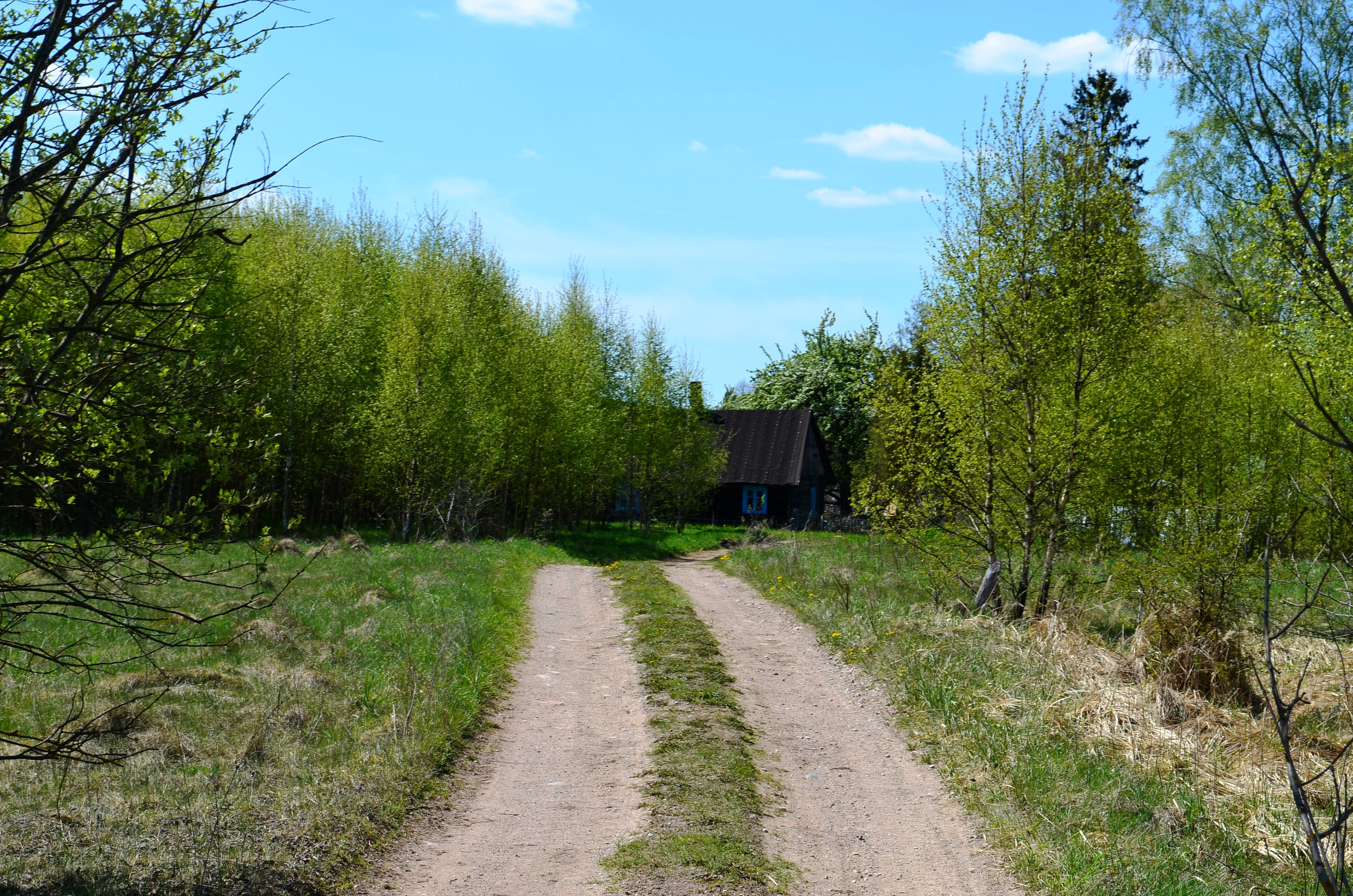
Paežeriai

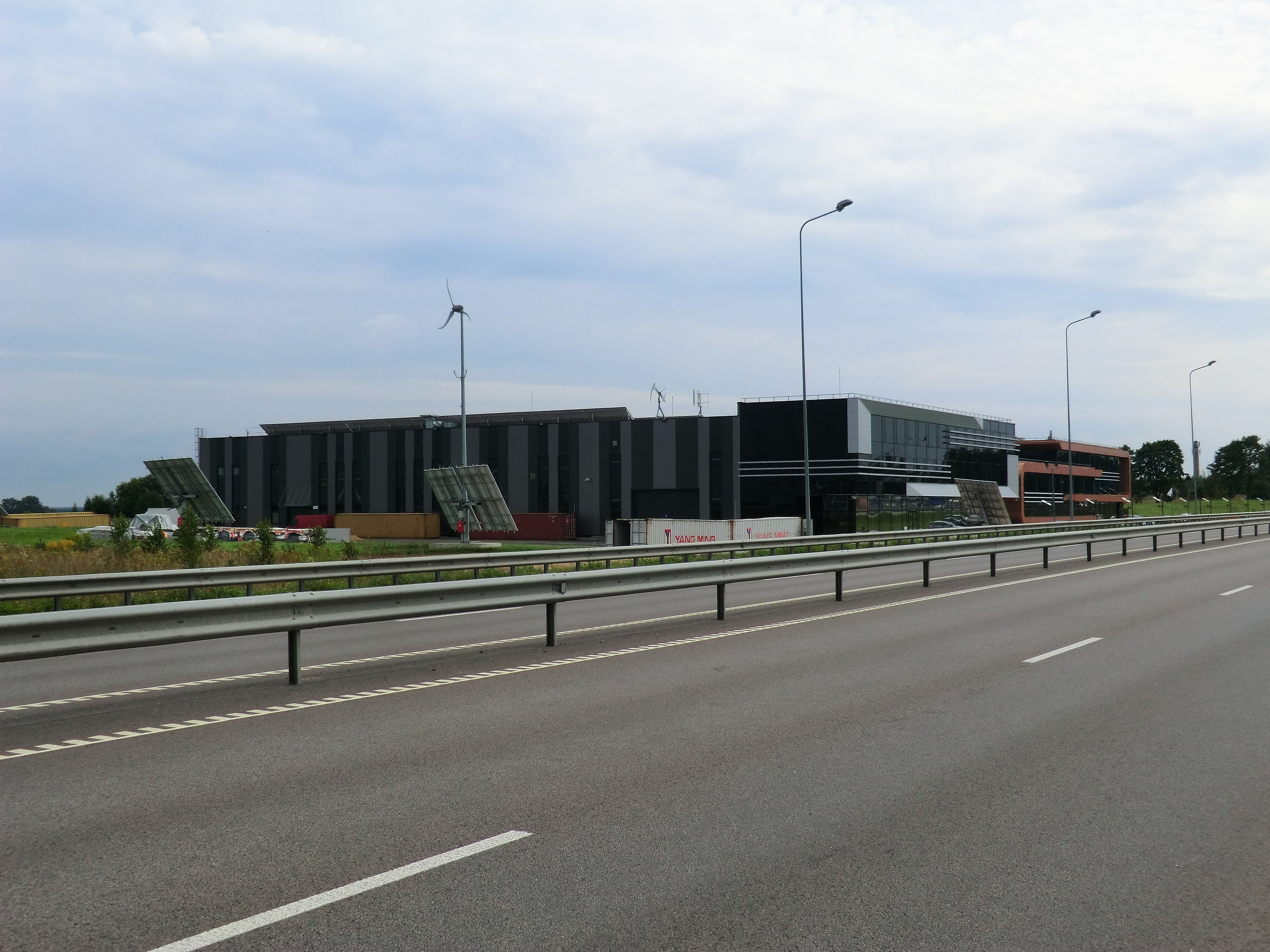
Modern offices and factories near Didžioji Riešė

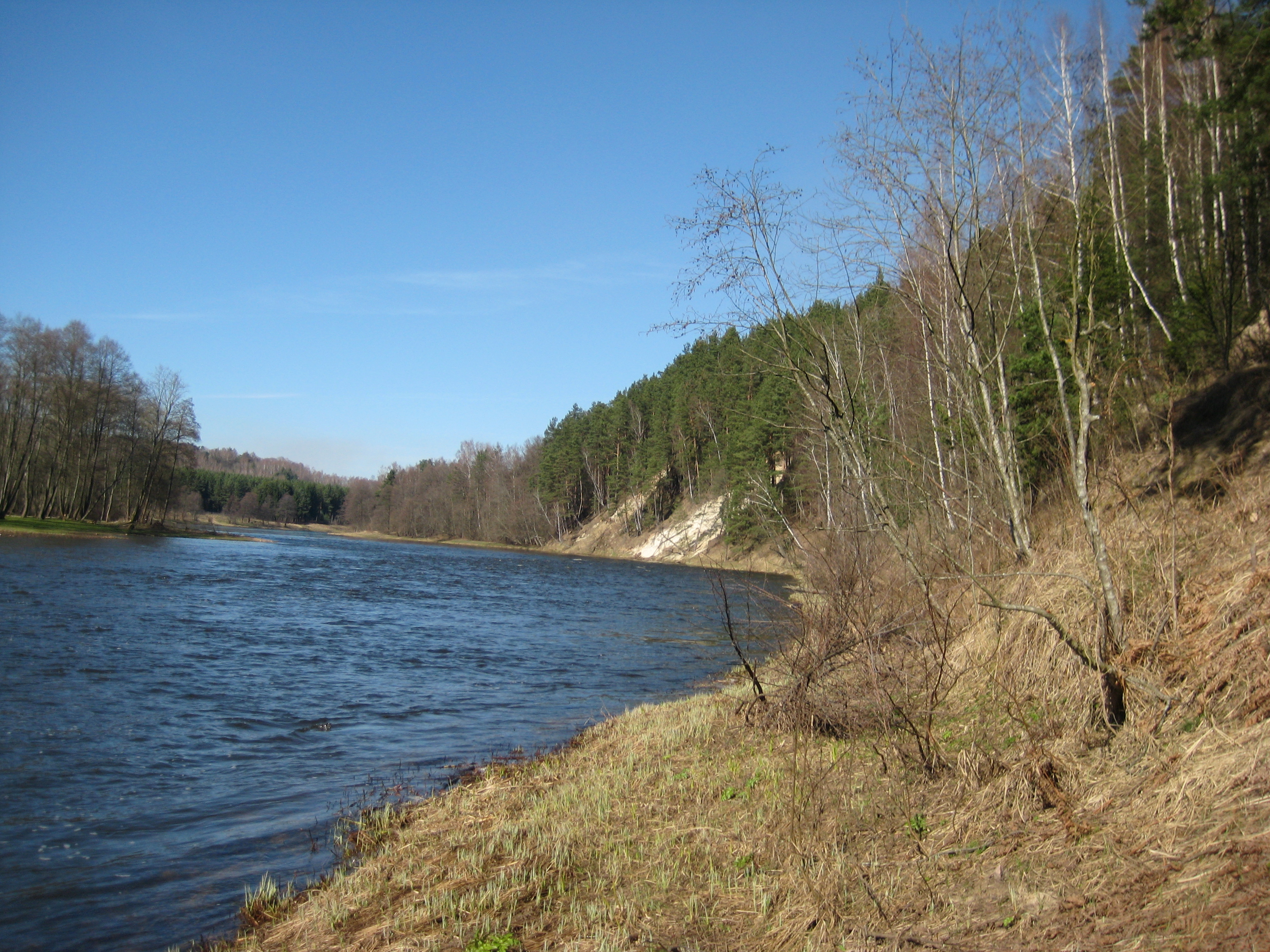
Riešė Eldership

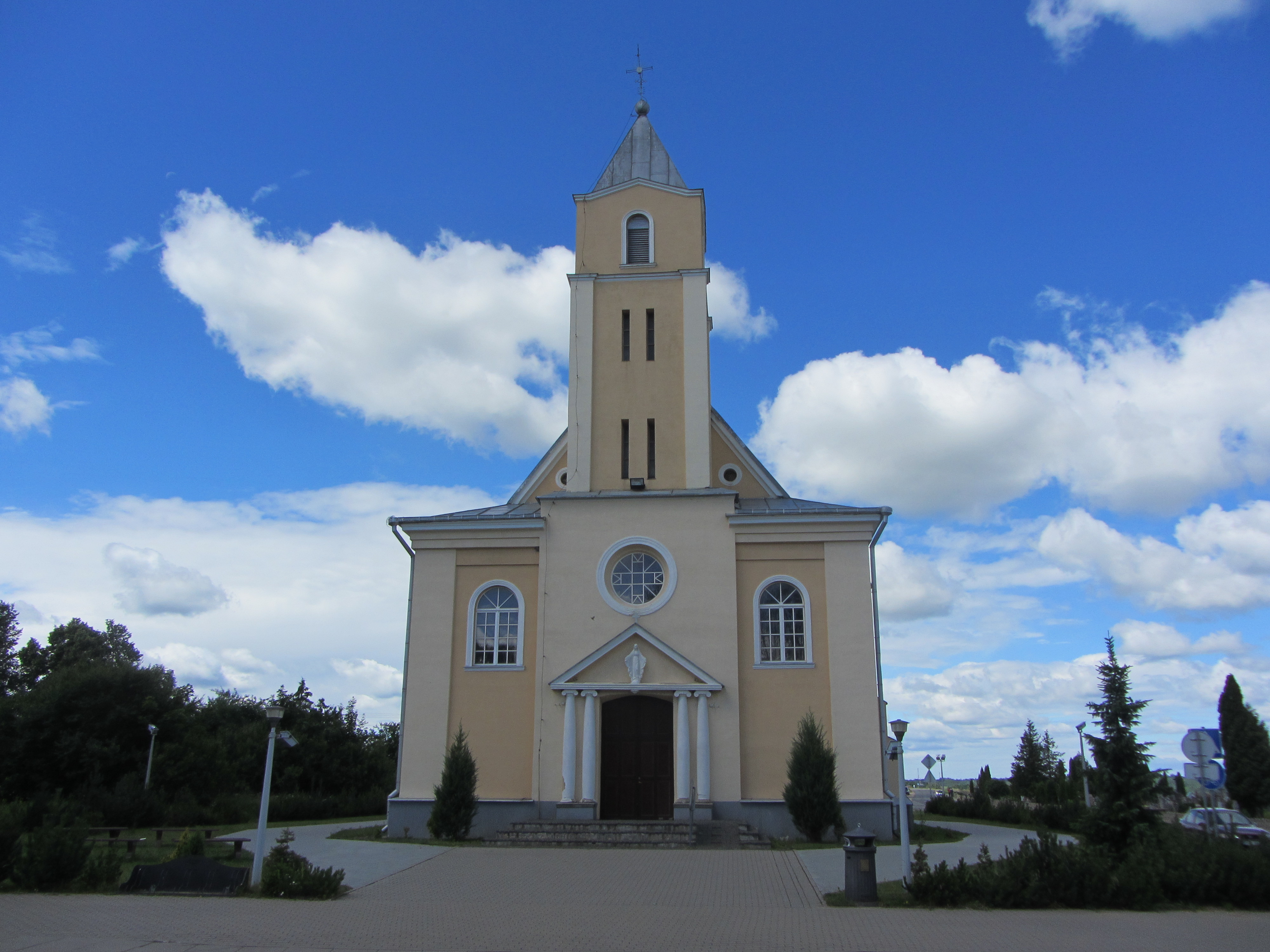
Historicist Church of Bishop Saint Stanislaus in Didžioji Riešė, built in 1939
