= Pikeliškės =

- Village
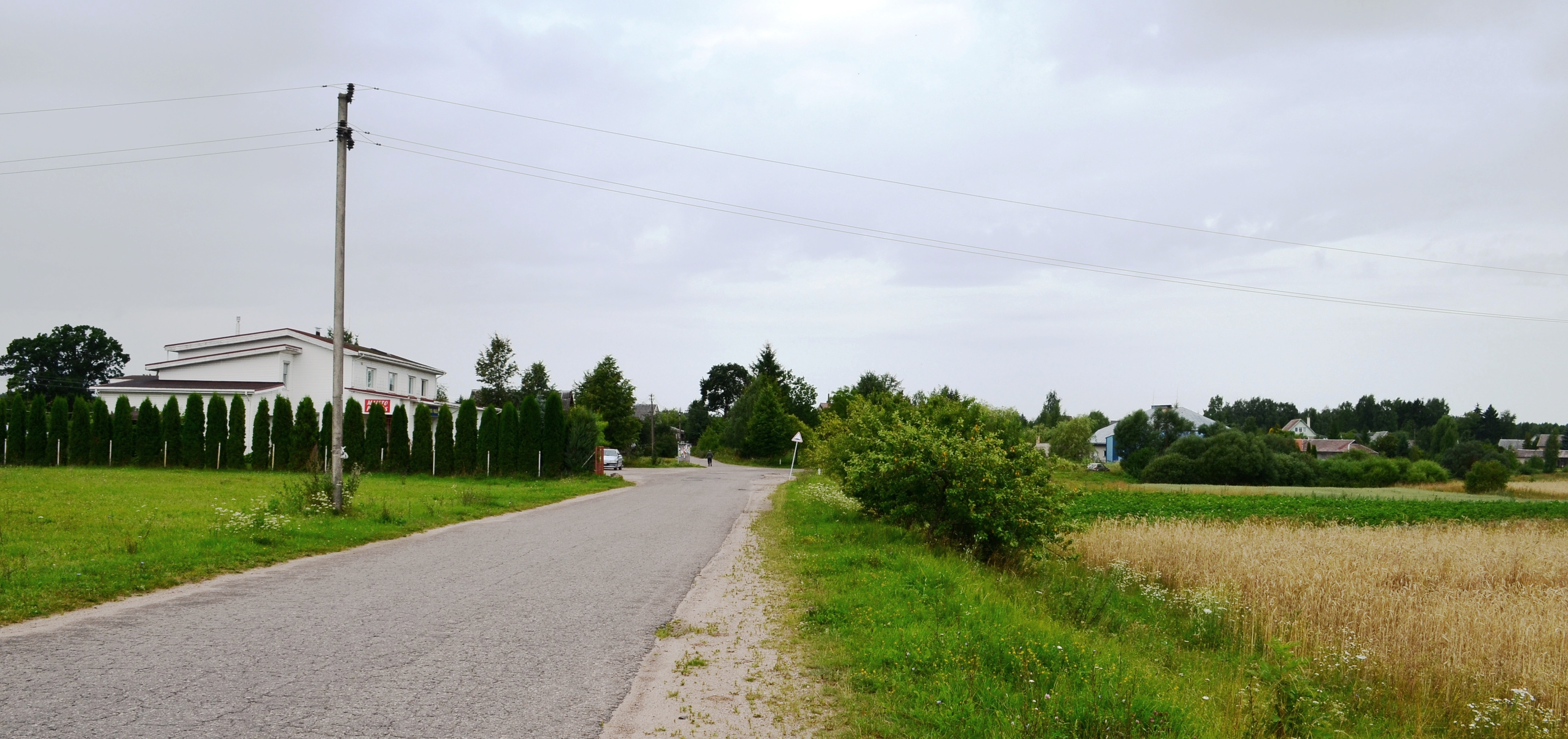
- Eastern part of the village

- Location of Pikeliškės
- Coordinates: 54°52′41″N 25°14′31″E
- Country: Lithuania
- County: Vilnius County
- Municipality: Vilnius city municipality
- Eldership: Riešė Eldership

Population (2021)
  - Total: 458
- Time zone: UTC+2 (EET)
  - Summer (DST): UTC+3 (EEST)

Pikeliškės is a village in Vilnius District Municipality, in Riešė Eldership. It is located 8 kilometers south of Paberžė. The village houses a lower secondary school and a library.

A former 18th-century manor farmstead that once was a summer residence of Józef Piłsudski can be found near Lake Žalesas.

== Geography ==
Lake Žalesas and Pikeliškės Forest are located near the village.
