= Skirgiškės =

- Village
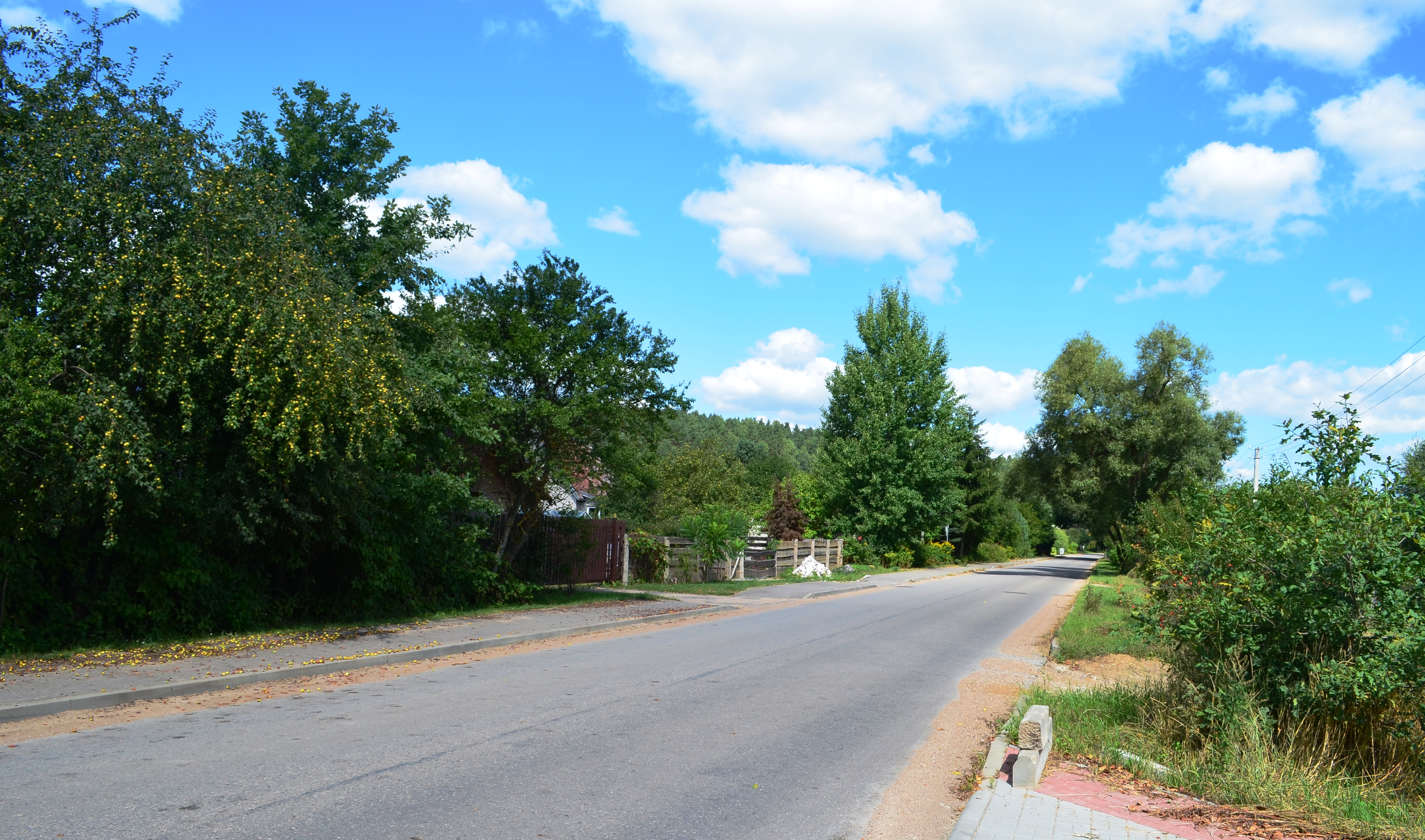
- Main street of Skirgiškės

- Location of Skirgiškės
- Coordinates: 54°50′17″N 25°22′16″E
- Country: Lithuania
- County: Vilnius County
- Municipality: Vilnius city municipality
- Eldership: Riešė Eldership

Population
  - Total: 381
- 2011 National Census (osp.stat.gov)
- Time zone: UTC+2 (EET)
  - Summer (DST): UTC+3 (EEST)

Skirgiškės is a village in Vilnius District Municipality, in Riešė Eldership, situated on the right bank of the Neris river. It is located near the Europos Parkas.
