= Ažulaukė =

- Village
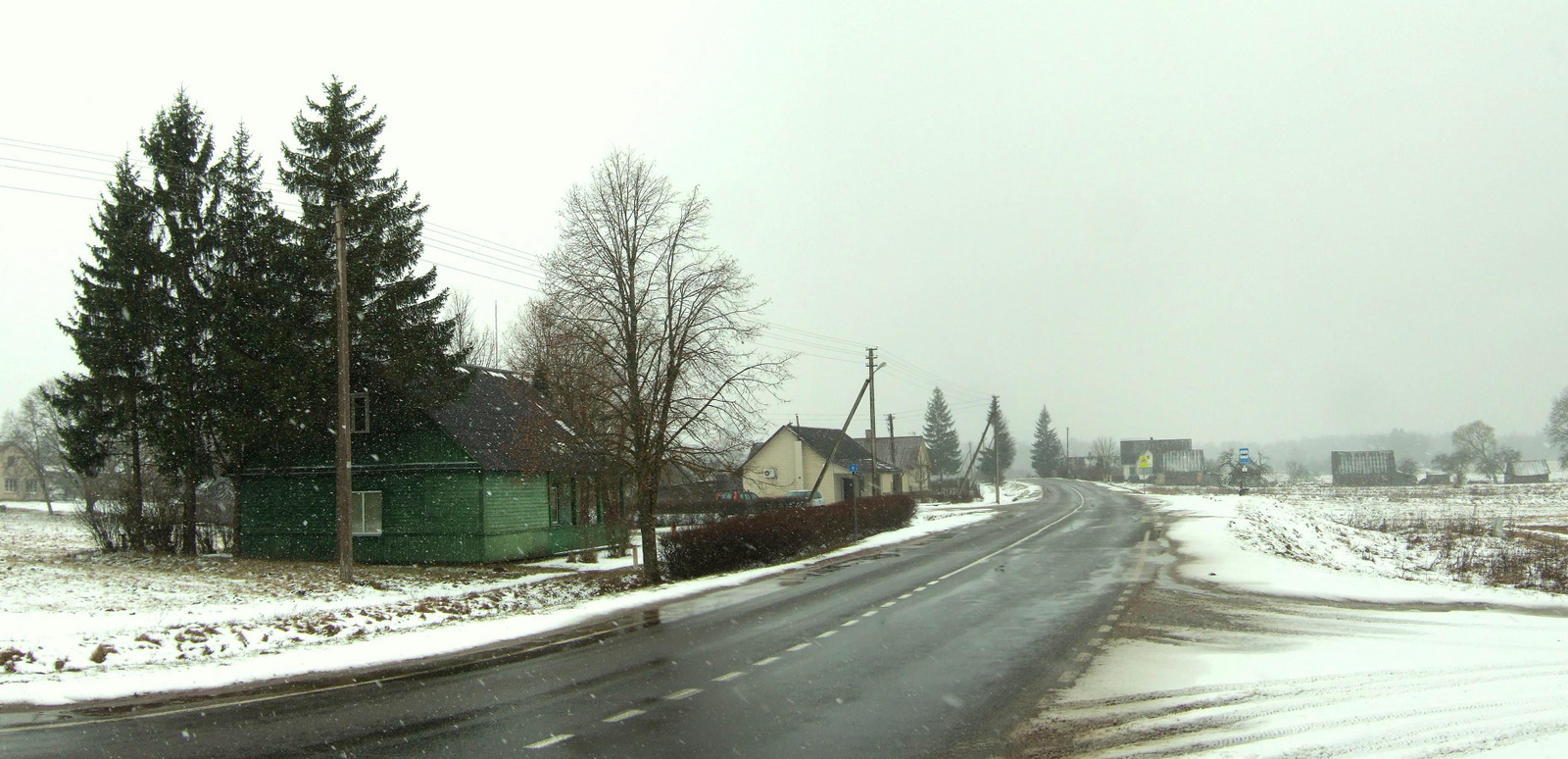

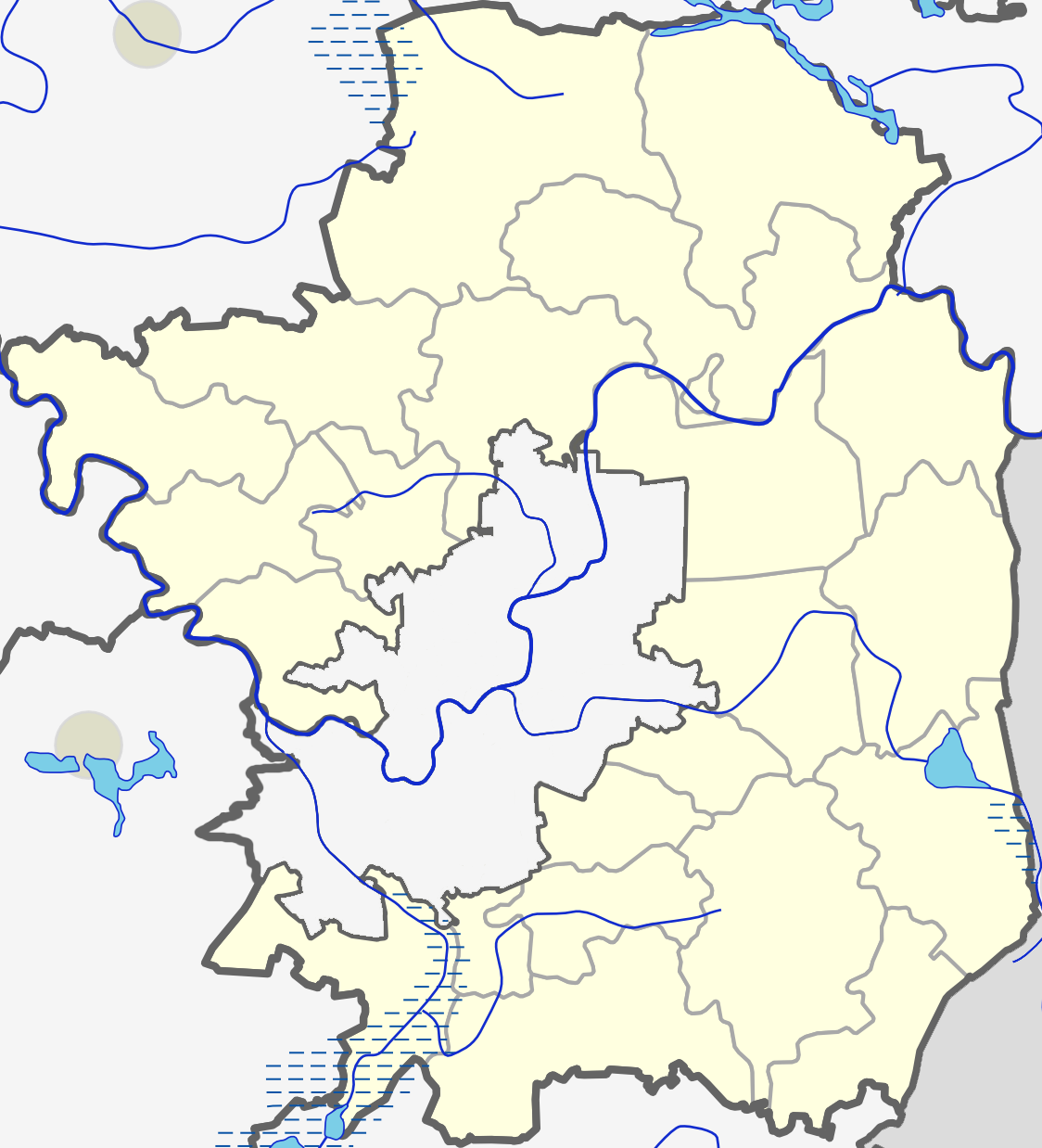
- Location of Ažulaukė Ažulaukė (Lithuania)
- Coordinates: 54°52′08″N 25°21′40″E
- Country: Lithuania
- County: Vilnius County
- Municipality: Vilnius district municipality
- Eldership: Riešė Eldership

Population (2011)
  - Total: 203
- Time zone: UTC+2 (EET)
  - Summer (DST): UTC+3 (EEST)

Ažulaukė is a village in Vilnius District Municipality, in Riešė Eldership.

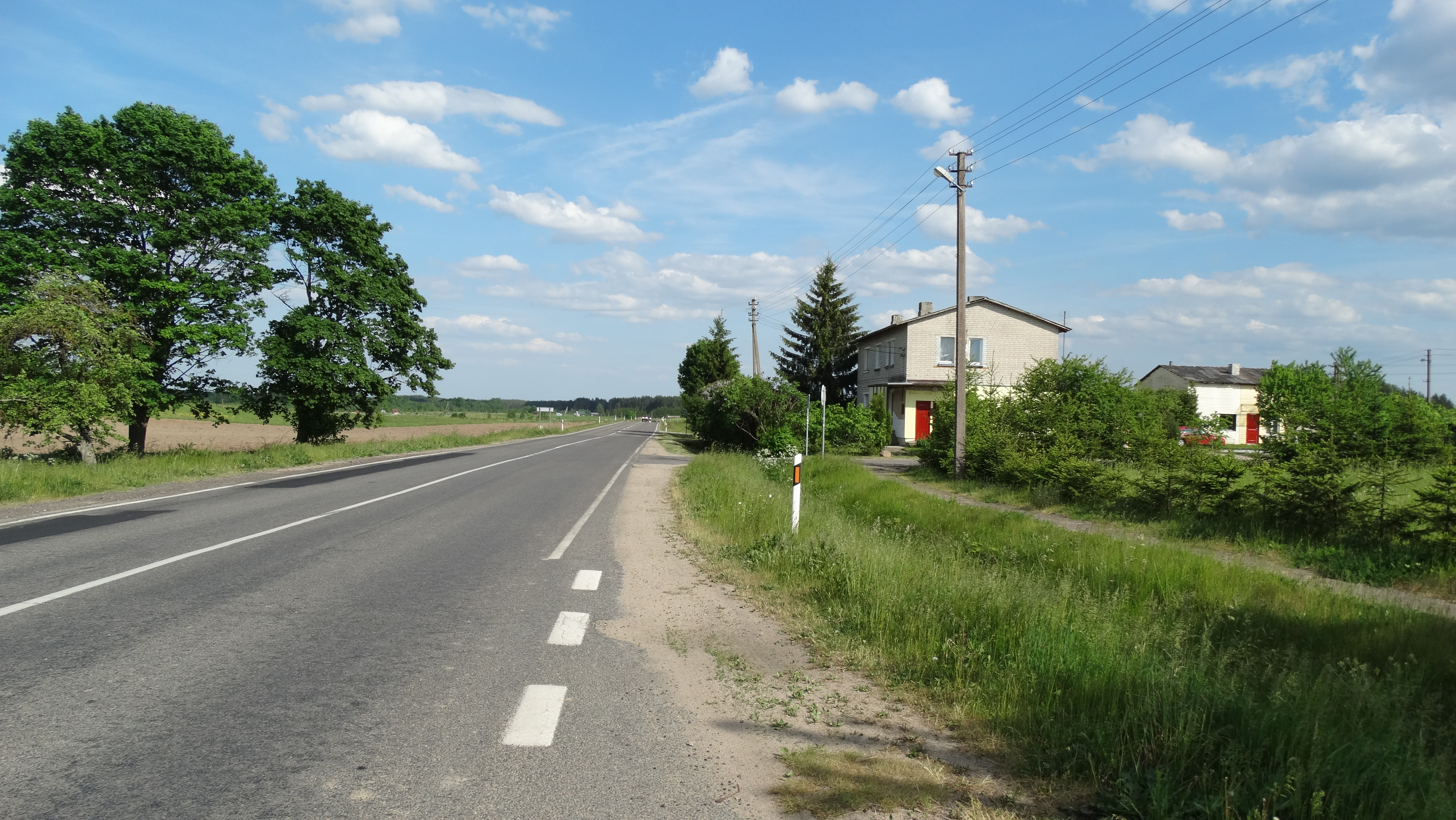
National road 103 at Ažulaukė
