= Raudondvaris, Riešė =

Raudondvaris
- Village
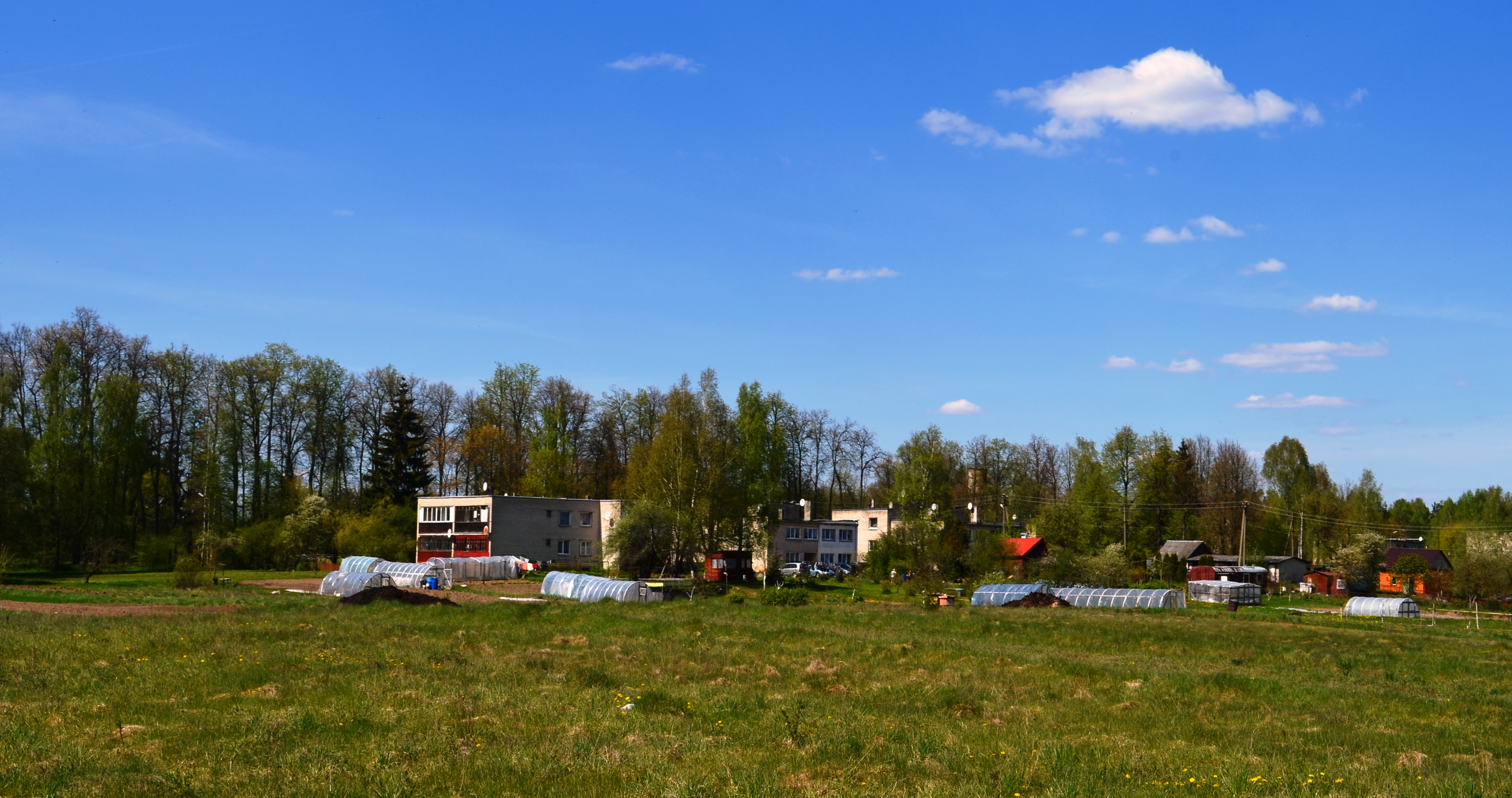

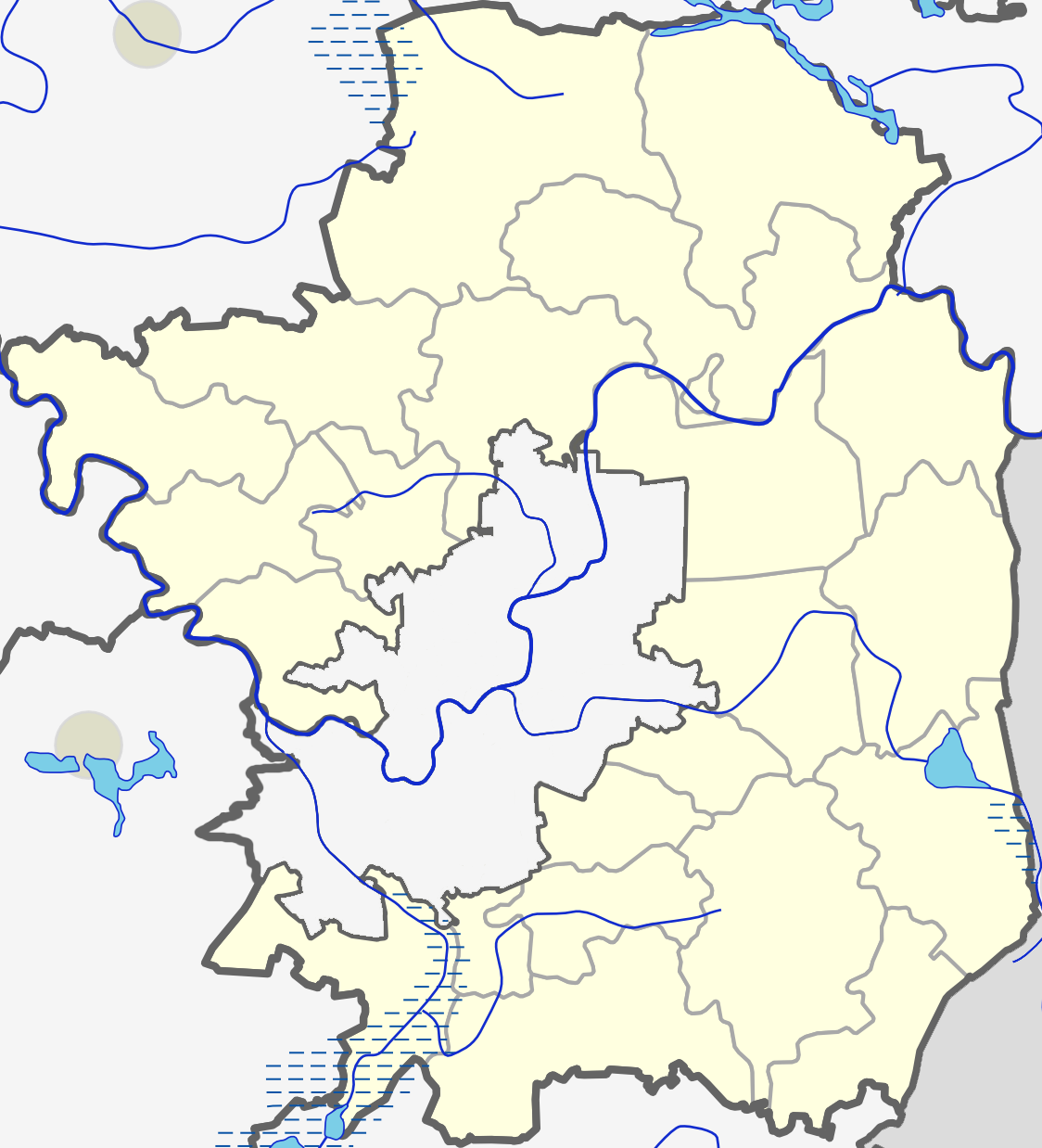
- Location of Raudondvaris Raudondvaris (Lithuania)
- Coordinates: 54°49′30″N 25°16′59″E
- Country: Lithuania
- County: Vilnius County
- Municipality: Vilnius District Municipality
- Eldership: Riešė Eldership

Population (2011)
  - Total: 271
- Time zone: UTC+2 (EET)
  - Summer (DST): UTC+3 (EEST)

Raudondvaris is a village in Vilnius District Municipality, in Riešė Eldership. It is situated 15 kilometers north of Vilnius, near Lake Raudondvaris. The village houses an 18th/19th-century manor treasury, tower and park.

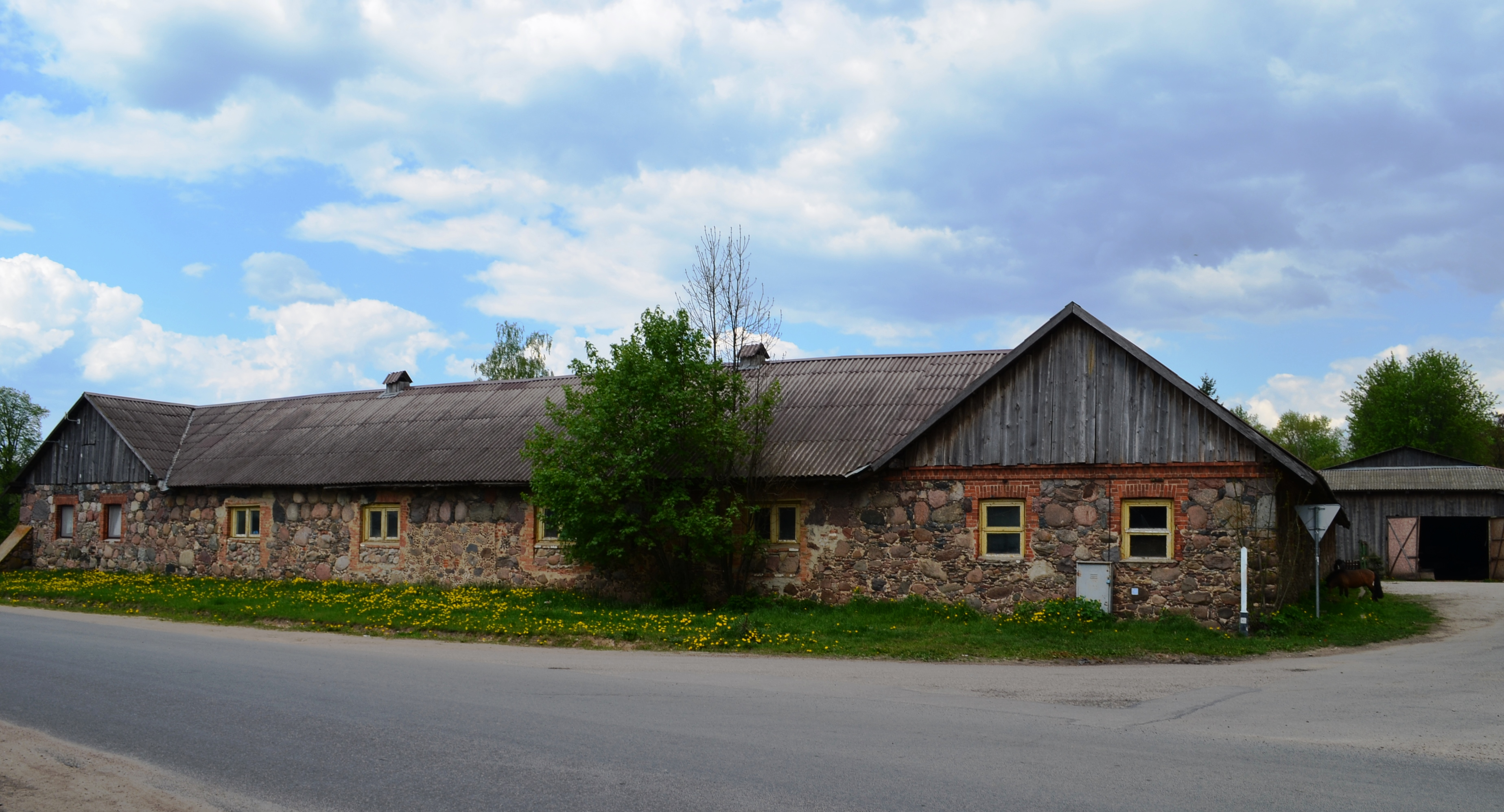
Raudondvaris mansion stables (2016)
