= Pikeliškės Manor =

Coordinates: 54°52′31″N 25°15′32″E

Pikeliškės Manor is a former residential manor in Pikeliškės village, Vilnius District Municipality, Lithuania. Currently it is occupied by Pikeliškės library.
