= Didžioji Riešė =

- Village
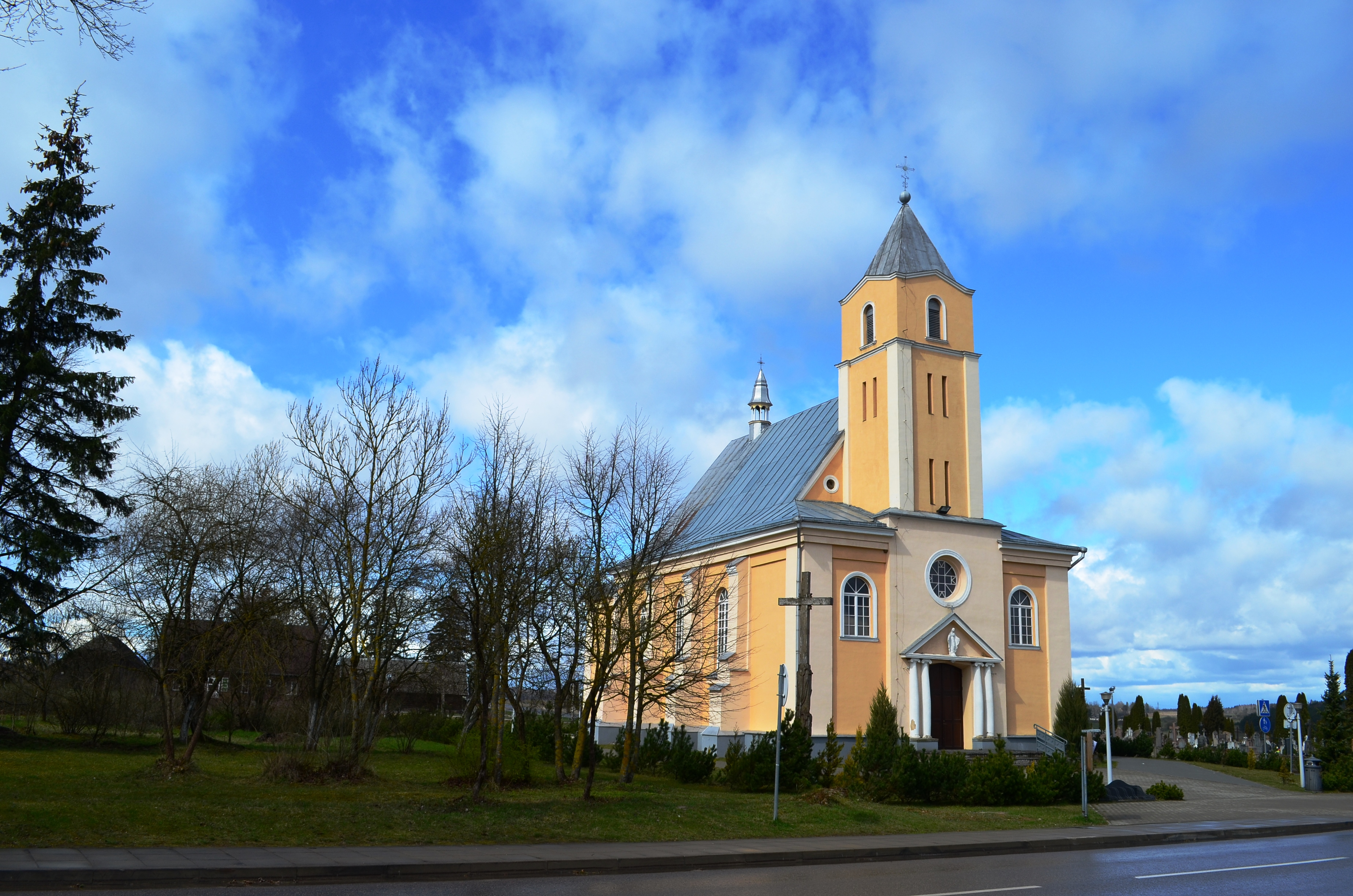
- Church of Didžioji Riešė

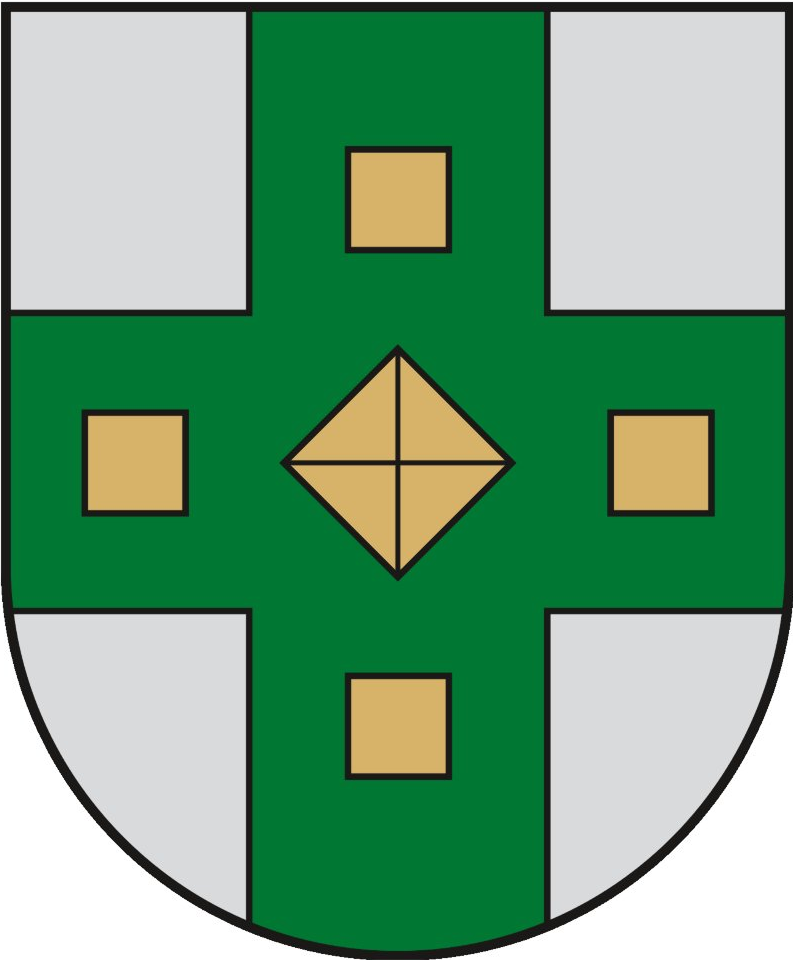
- Coat of arms

- Location of Didžioji Riešė
- Coordinates: 54°48′11″N 25°15′50″E
- Country: Lithuania
- County: Vilnius County
- Municipality: Vilnius District Municipality
- Eldership: Riešė Eldership

Population (2011)
  - Total: 2,520
- Time zone: UTC+2 (EET)
  - Summer (DST): UTC+3 (EEST)

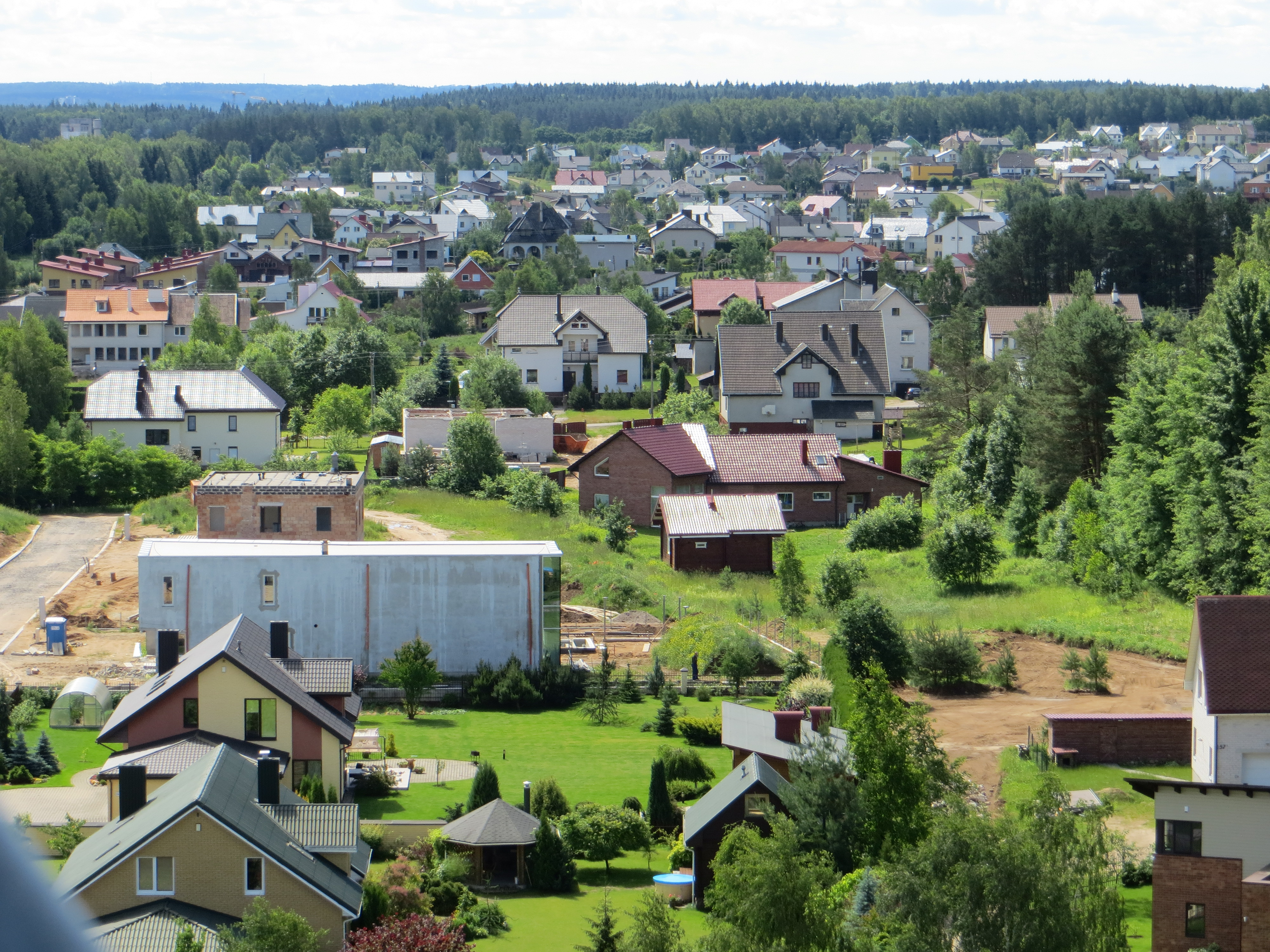
Fragment of Didžioji Riešė residential housing

Didžioji Riešė (Lithuanian pronunciation: [dʲɪˈd͡ʑoːjɪ rʲɪeˑˈʃʲeː]) is a village and administrative centre of Riešė eldership, Vilnius District Municipality, Lithuania. It is located only about 1 kilometre (0.62 mi) north-west of Vilnius city municipality, on the road Vilnius–Molėtai. At the 2011 census, the village had a population of 2,520, compared to a population of 1,142 recorded during the 2001 census.

== History ==
During the Soviet occupation, it was a central settlement of a Soviet farm.

In 2017, the official coat-of-arms was authorized.

On August 1st 2026, the town was hit by a strong IF2 tornado, throwing a 100kg grill into a persons balcony.
