= Liubavas Manor =

Coordinates: 54°51′2″N 25°20′29″E

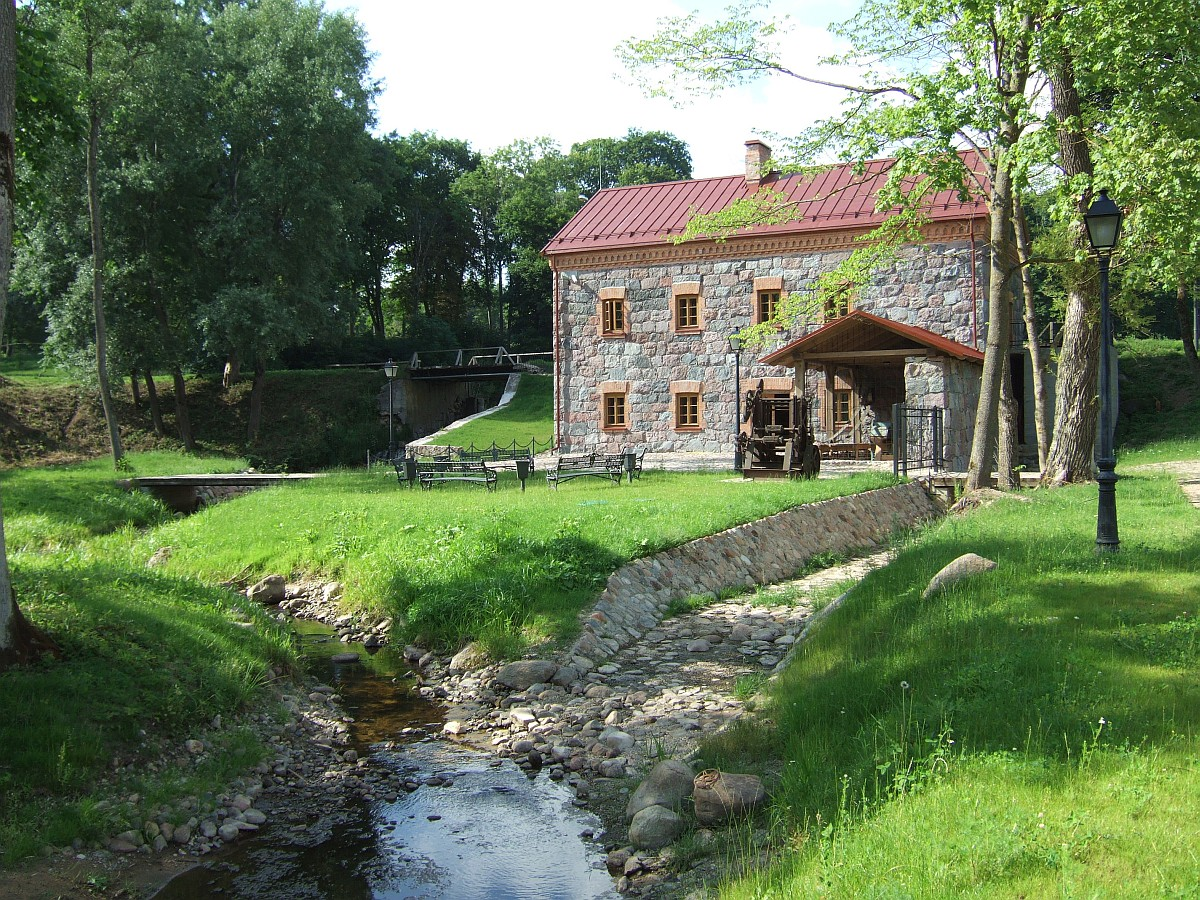
Liubavas Manor mill

Liubavas Manor is located in Liubavas, in the northern part of Vilnius, in a picturesque area by the River Žalesa. Till our days there are 11 buildings, a system of terrace ponds and plantation in Liubavas manor homestead left. Under the initiative of sculptor Gintaras Karosas, Liubavas Manor Museum was established in 2011 (the mill was built in 1902 in place of the previous one mentioned since 1727). In 2016 the 18th century Liubavas Manor Baroque architectural ensemble – officine (treasure) and orangery was restored and adapted to the museum. In 2018 the manor house bridge with a section of stone boulders was restored. The stone paved road of Liubavas manor leads from Bireliai to Liubavas manor. In 2012 Liubavas Manor Watermill Museum has been awarded the European Union Prize for Cultural Heritage / Europa Nostra Award as an excellent example of a fine and sophisticated restoration. The Museum of History, Cultural and Technical Heritage of Liubavas Manor is open on weekends from 15 April to 15 October.

== History ==
Since the beginning of 15th century until the middle of 16th century Liubavas was ruled by noblemen Goštautas of the Grand Duchy of Lithuania. In 16th century the estate was transferred to the family of the Grand Duke of Lithuania. In 1546 the treasury book of the Grand Duke Sigismund Augustus of Lithuania describes in detail the Liubavas ponds that were being repaired at that time. Later Liubavas was ruled by Mikołaj "the Red" Radziwiłł, Golejewski, Kryszpin Kirszensztejn, Tyszkiewicz and Ślizień.

Liubavas Manor was home to the famous Lithuanian sculptor in 19th century Rafał Ślizień (1804–1881). He was buried with his wife in the underground chapel-mausoleum in Liubavas. In 16th–17th centuries the territories of the manor reached the lakes Siesartis and Kirneilis near Moletai.

== Gallery ==
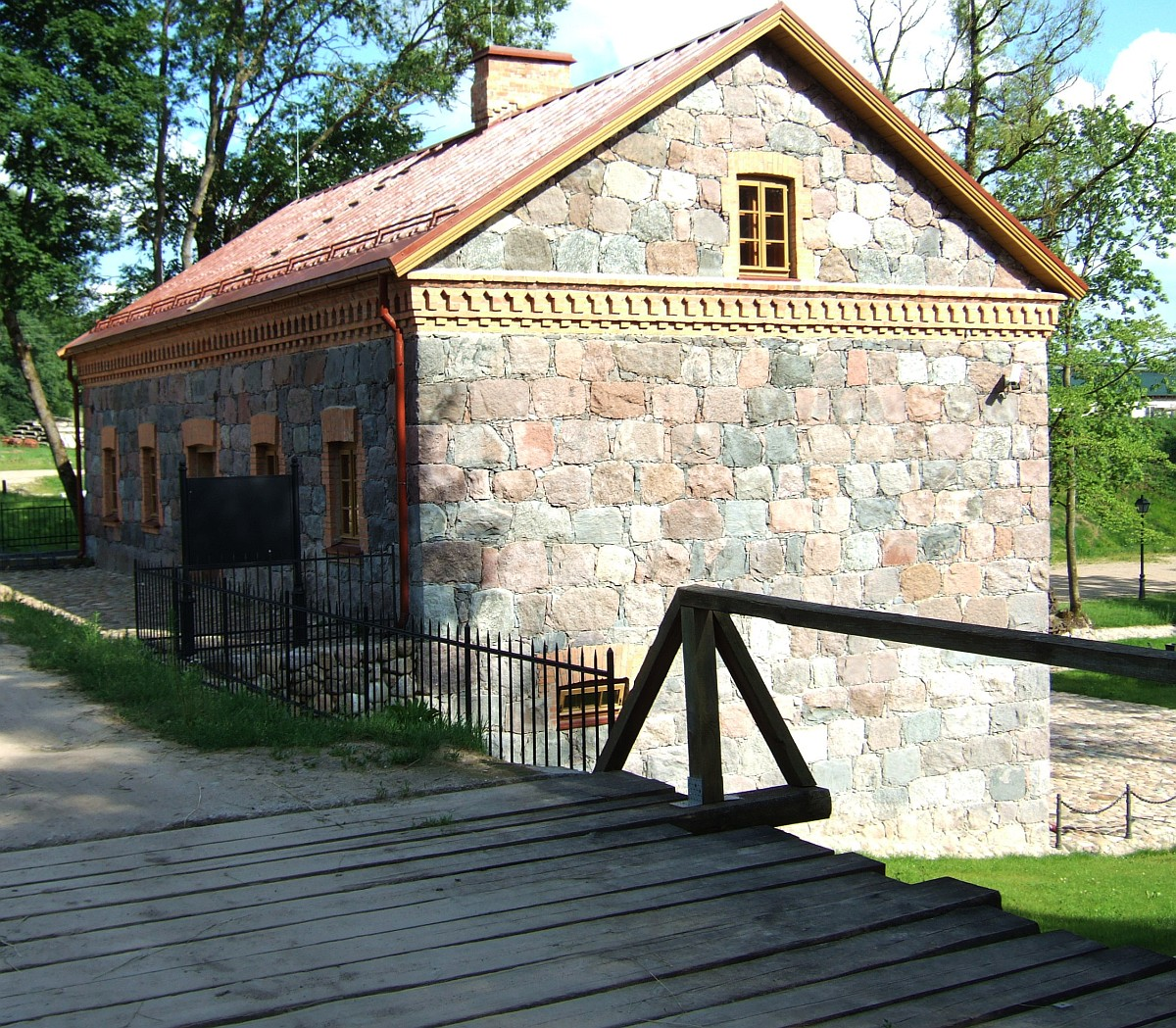
Mill

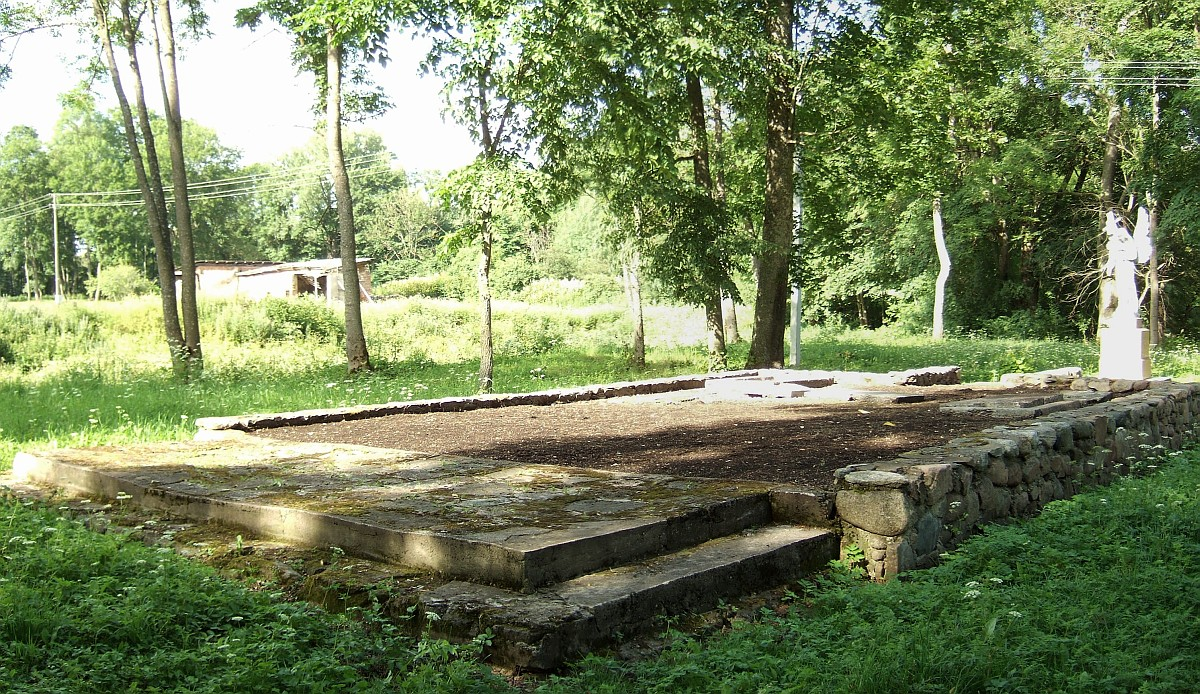
Manor chapel foundation

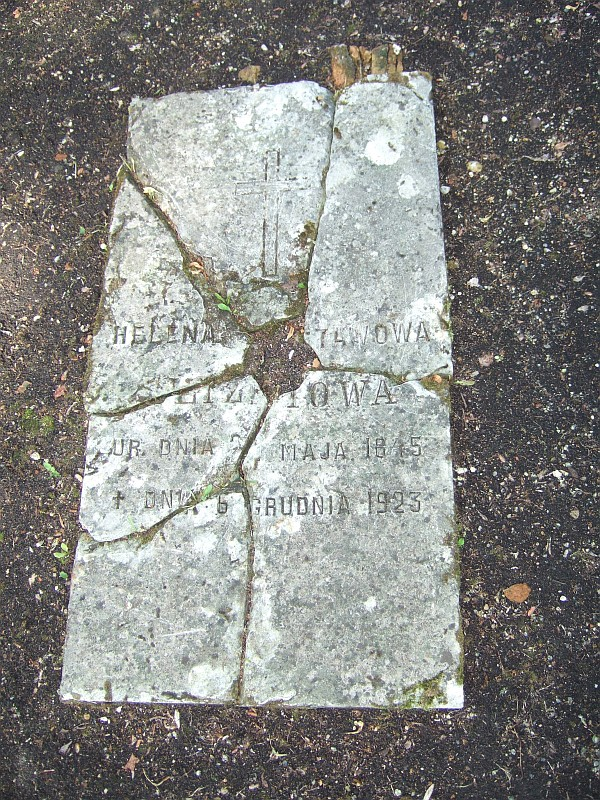
Helena Ślizeniowa née Domejko tomb

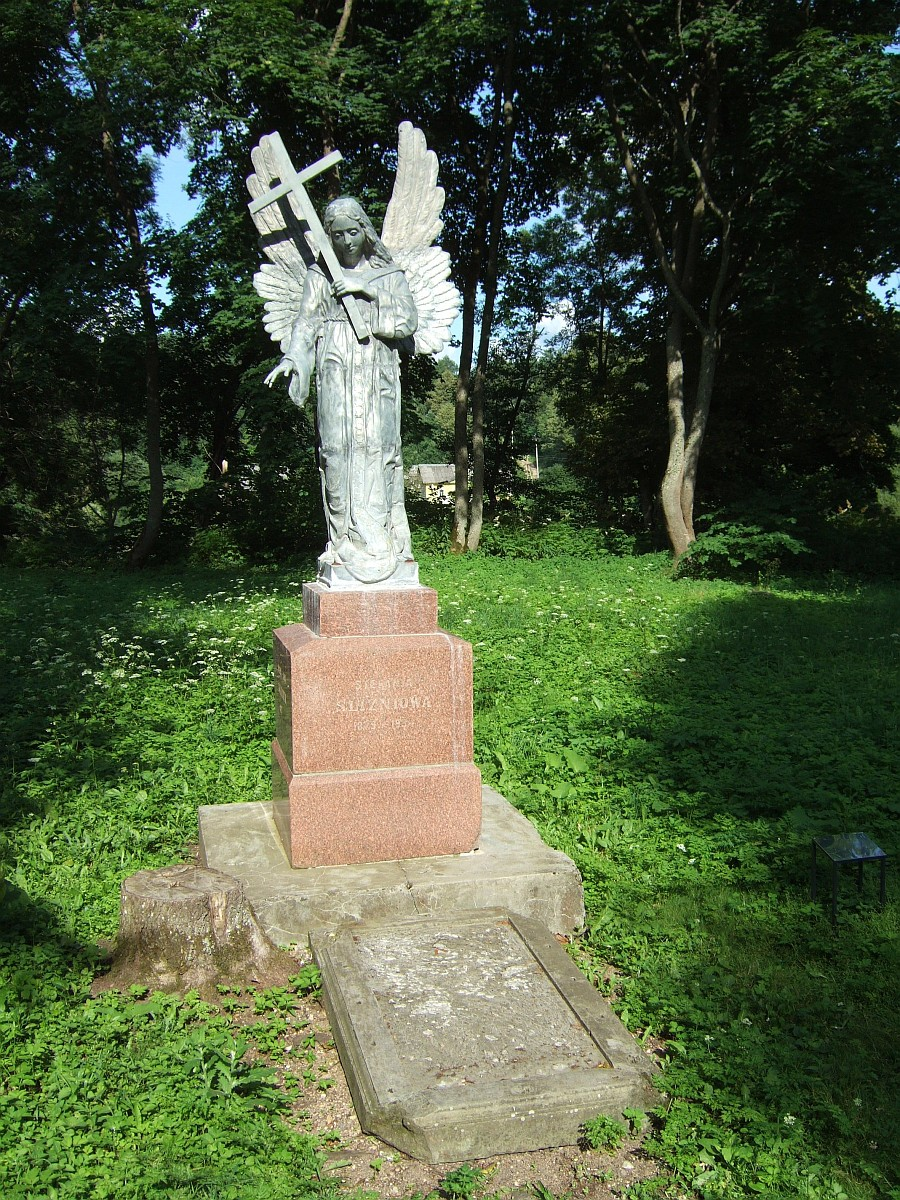
Liubavas angel

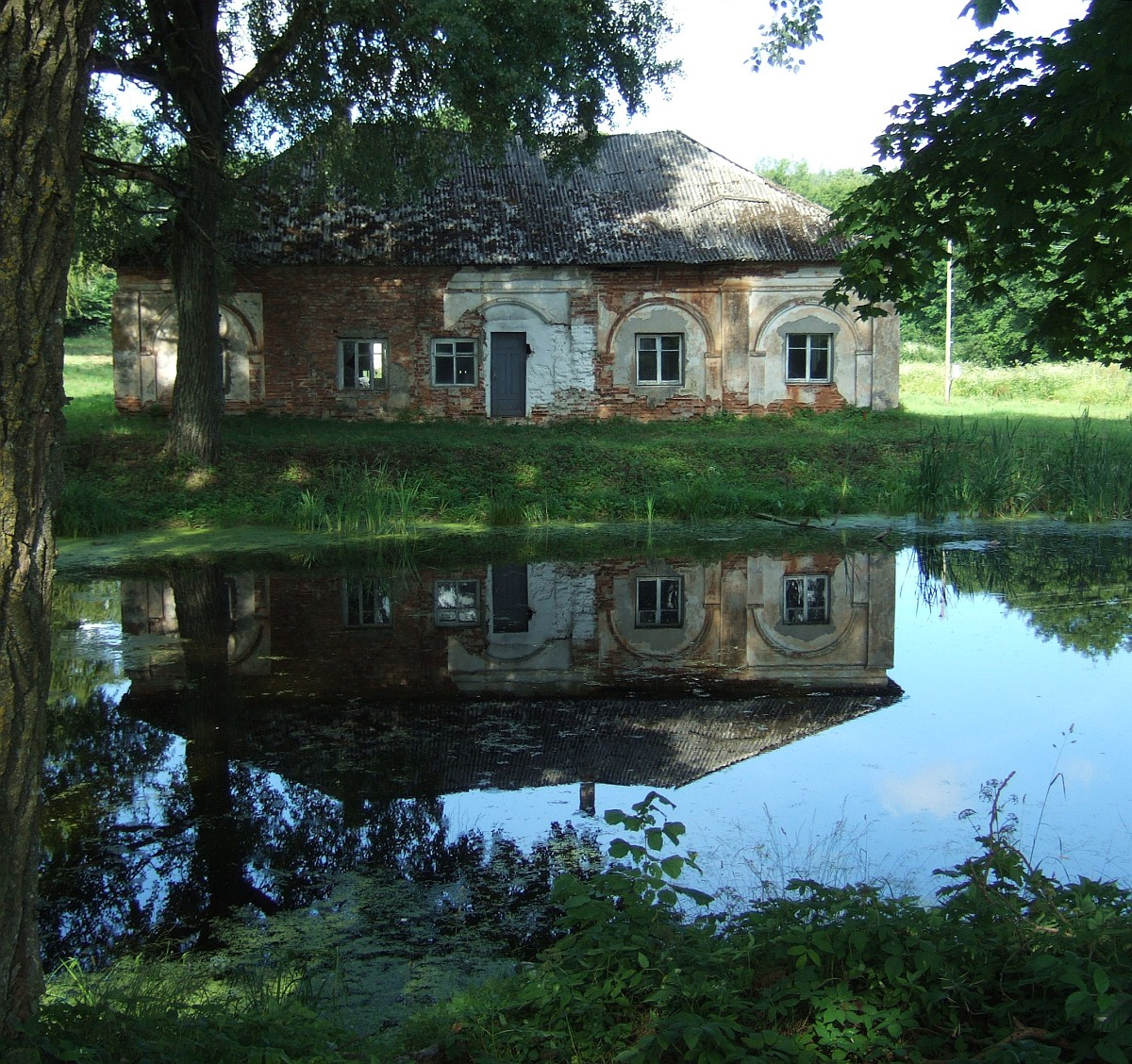
Oficine

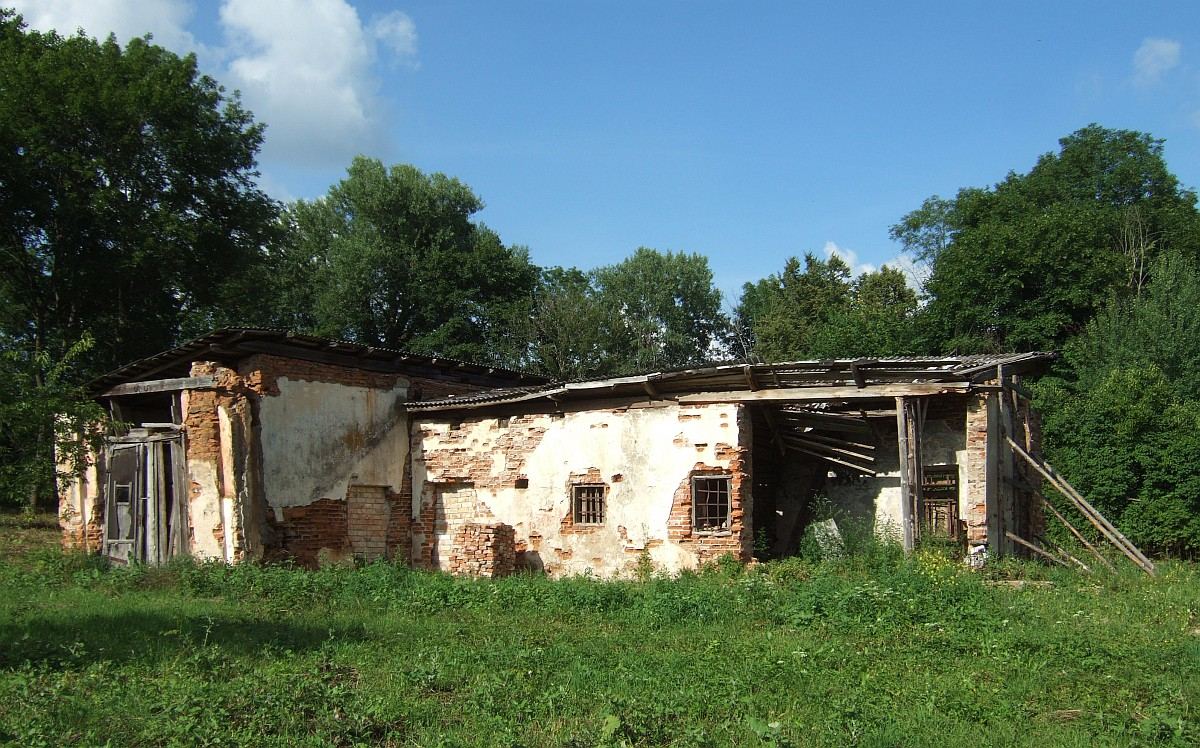
Orangery

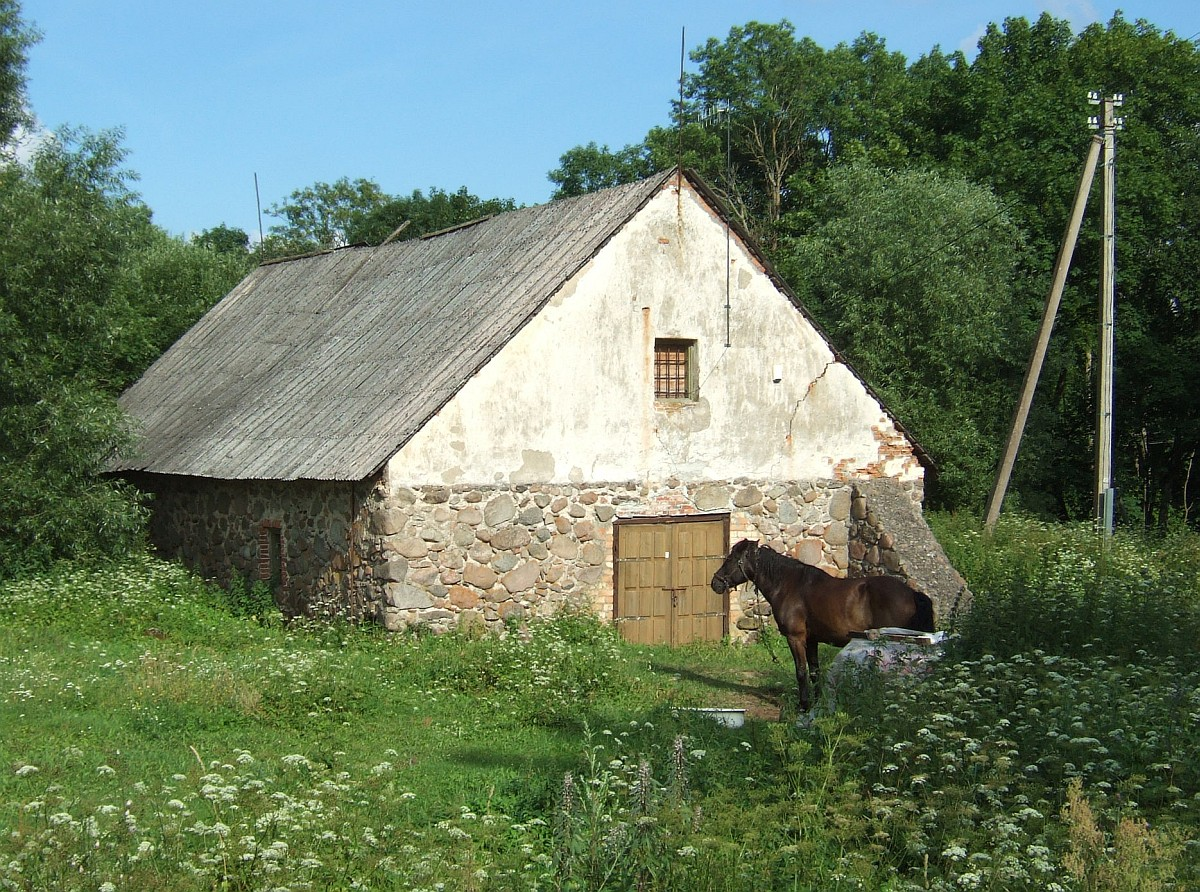
Outbuilding

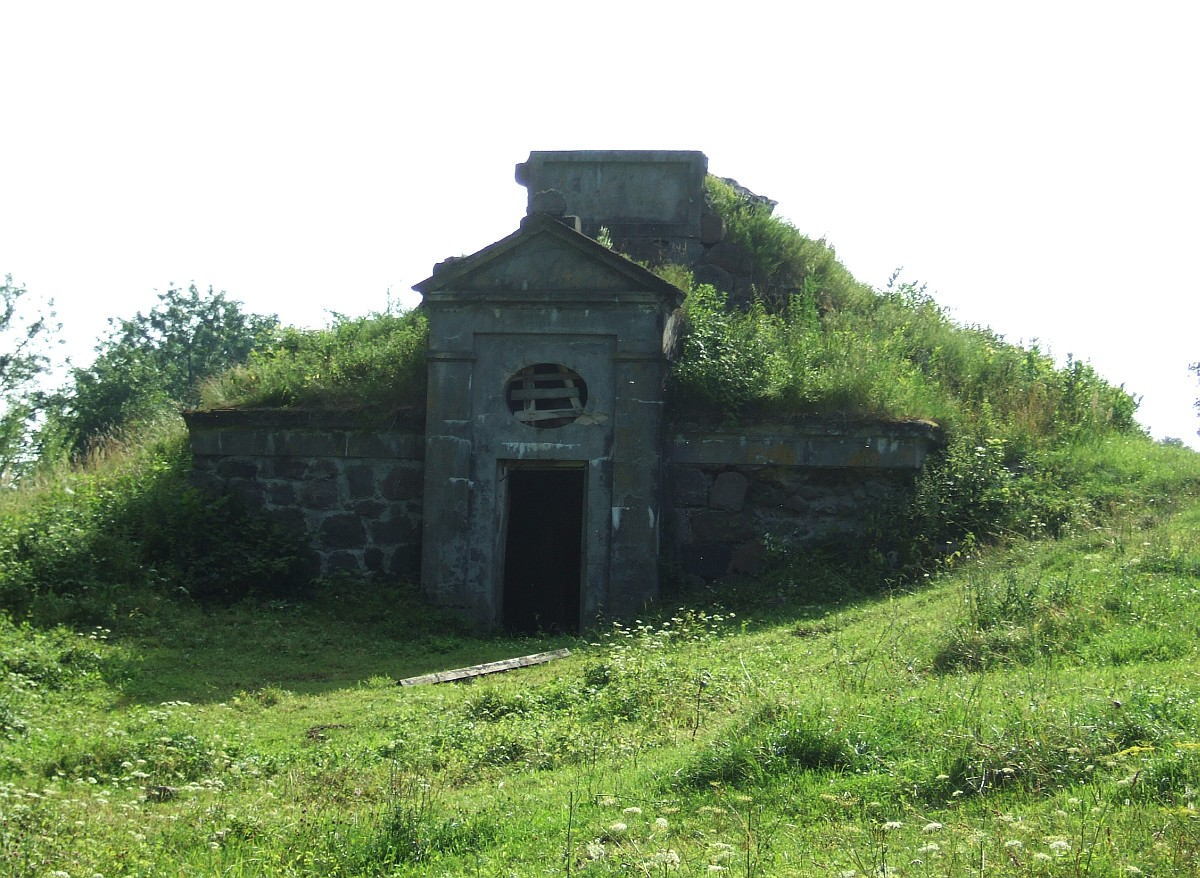
Icehouse
