= Dūkštos Eldership =

Dūkštos Eldership Dūkštų seniūnija
- Eldership
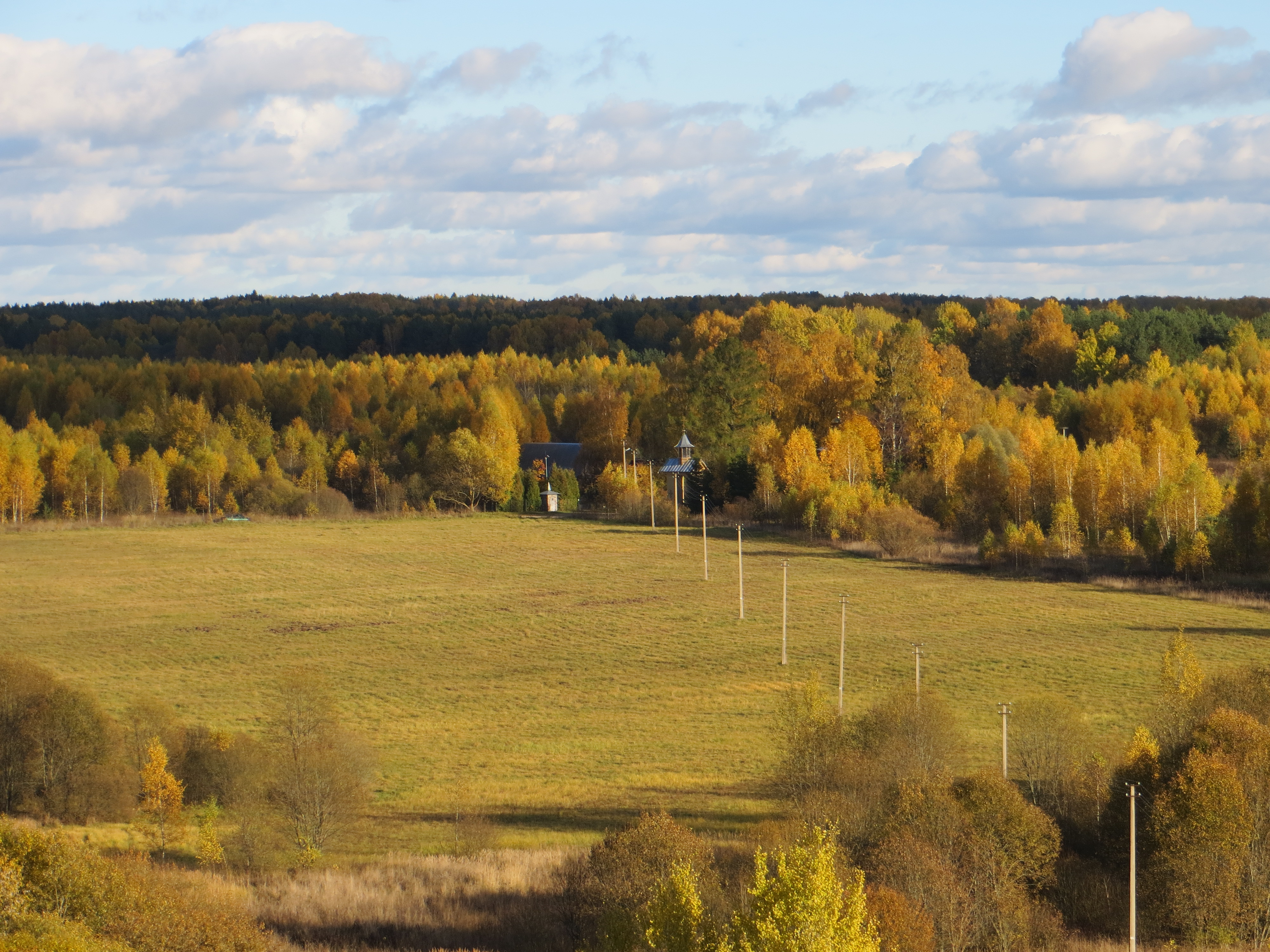
- Landscape near Geisiškės

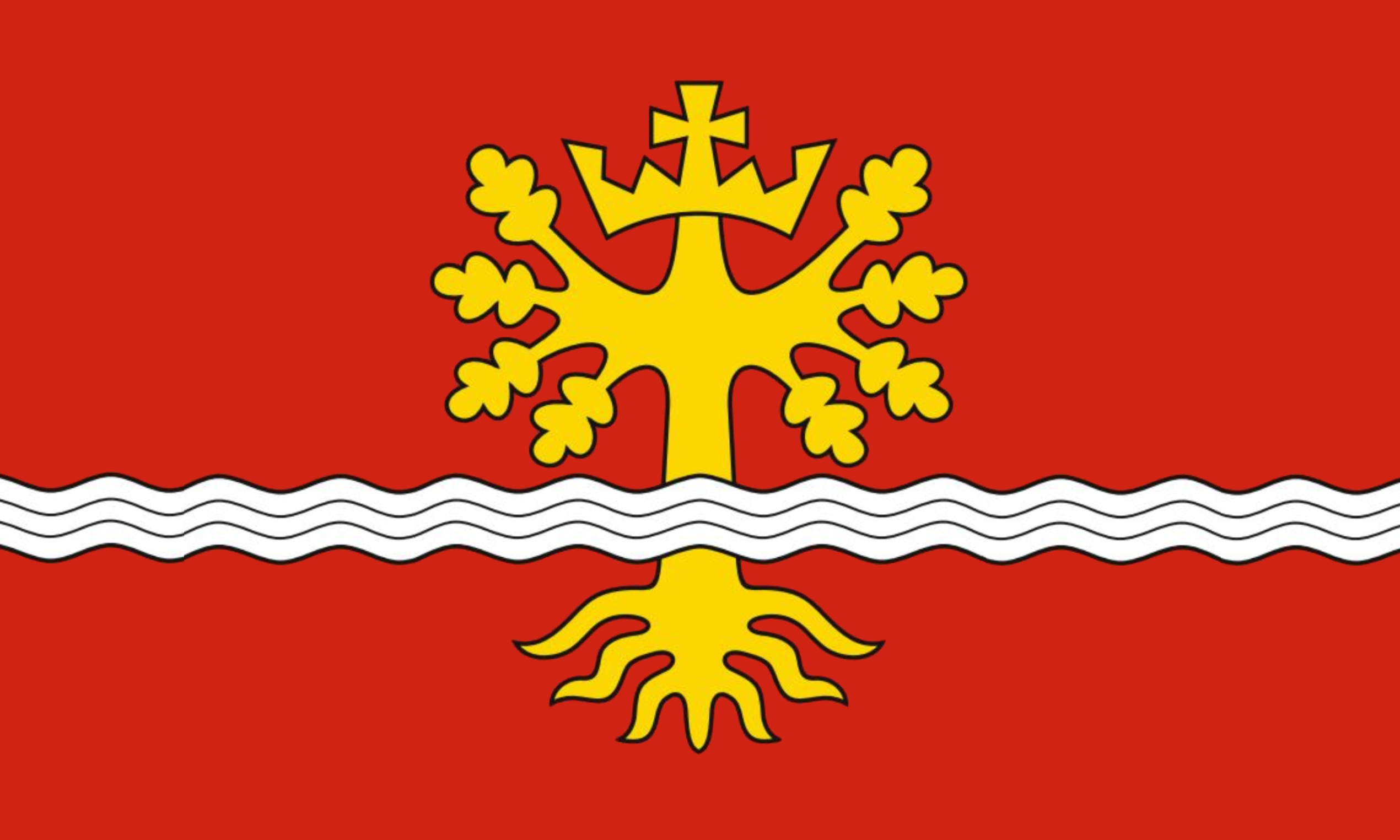
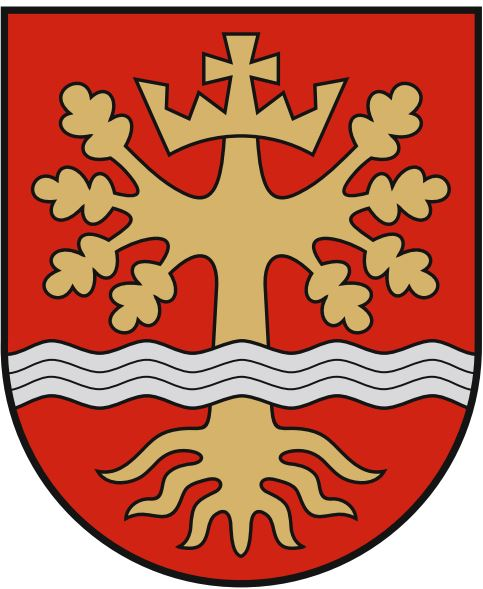
- Flag Seal

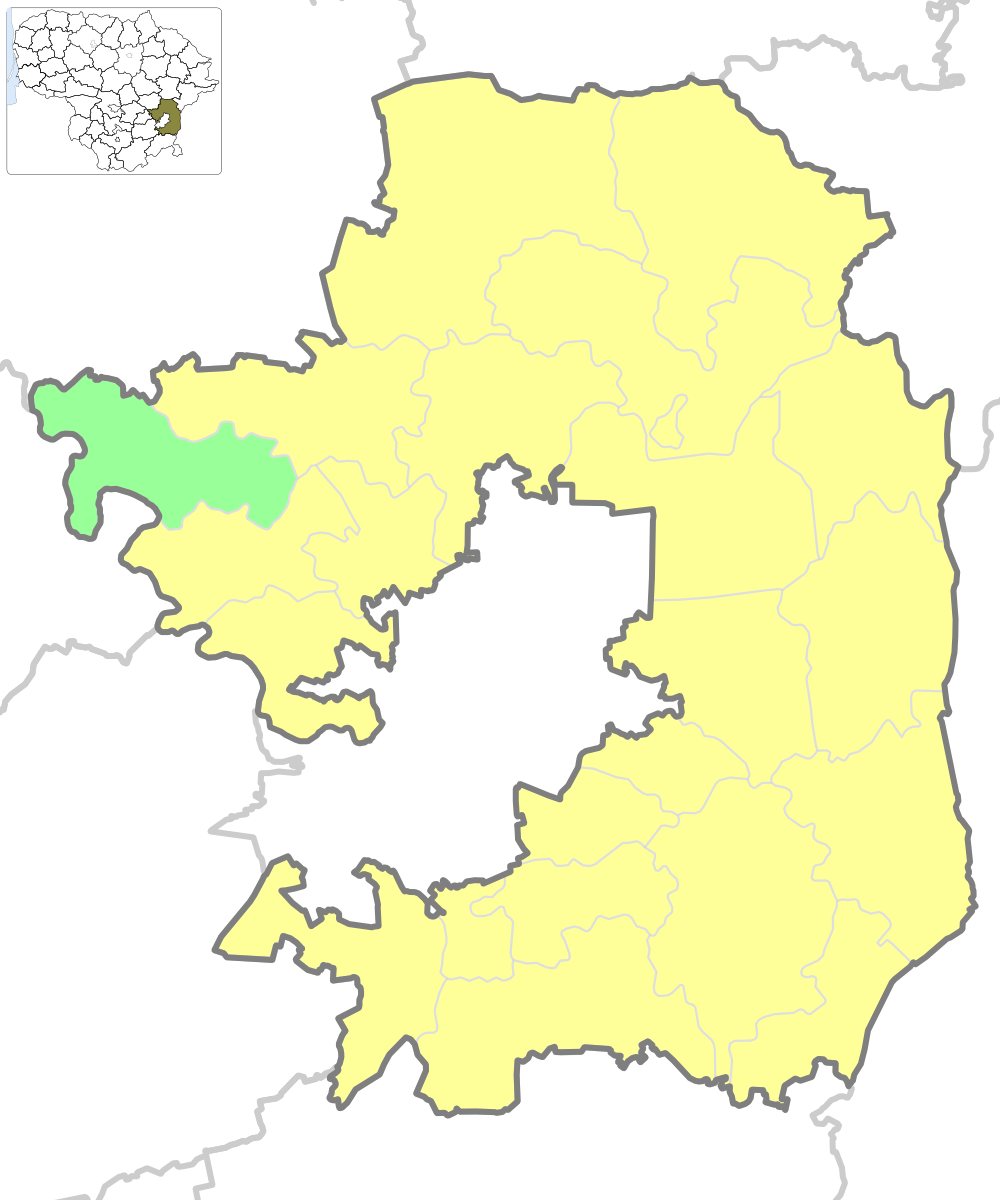
- Location of Dūkštos Eldership
- Country: Lithuania
- Ethnographic region: Dzūkija
- County: Vilnius County
- Municipality: Vilnius District Municipality
- Administrative centre: Dūkštos

Government
  - Elder: Honorata Masalskienė

Area
  - Total: 89.66 km^{2} (34.62 sq mi)

Population (2019)
  - Total: 1,930
  - Density: 21.5/km^{2} (55.8/sq mi)
- Time zone: UTC+2 (EET)
  - Summer (DST): UTC+3 (EEST)
- Website: https://www.vrsa.lt

Dūkštos Eldership (Lithuanian: Dūkštų seniūnija) is an eldership in Lithuania, located in Vilnius District Municipality, east of Vilnius.

== Geography and nature ==
The eldership is home to Neris Regional Park.

Neris Regional Park also incorporates Bražuolė Botanical Reserve and Vepriai Botanical Reserve, which have many rare and endangered plant species and forests common to southern Lithuania.

Also within the nature reserve is the Dūkštai oak grove with Oak of Dūkštai.

== History ==
Dūkštos were mentioned in historical sources since the 14th century, when Teutonic knights frequently raided Kernavė, and its people used to retreat to Dūkštos.

In 1743, Dūkštos became property of a Piarist monastery. By 1790, there was a working parish school, later reformed into a Piarist college.

After the failed November Uprising of 1830-1831, Piarists were forced to leave Dūkštos. The village was very supportive of the January Uprising of 1863, and a revolutionary commander headquarters were established in the nearby forests, while a nearby valley served as the location of a military hospital for revolutionaries and people injured during clashes with the Tsarist authorities. In 1868, by an order of the governor of Vilnius, the local church was closed, later converted to an orthodox church, and only returned to Catholics by the end of the 20th century.

== Populated places ==
There are 49 villages in the eldership, the largest of which are Brinkiškės, Dūkštos, Geisiškės, Verkšionys and Miežionys.

== Notable locations ==
- Stone of Bradeliškės - a protected boulder with undeciphered runic script, located within Dūkštai oak grove.
- Karmazinai Mound
- Tumuli compound near Karmazinai village
- Bradeliškės Hillfort
- Bradeliškės water mill
- Bradeliškės hillfort

== Ethnic composition ==
According to the 2021 census, there were 1808 inhabitants in Dūkštos eldership, among them, there were:

- Lithuanians - 774 or 42.8%
- Poles - 764 or 42.3%
- Russians - 196 or 10.8%

According to the 2011 census:

- Poles - 53.9%
- Lithuanians - 30.1%
- Russians - 11.6%

== Gallery ==
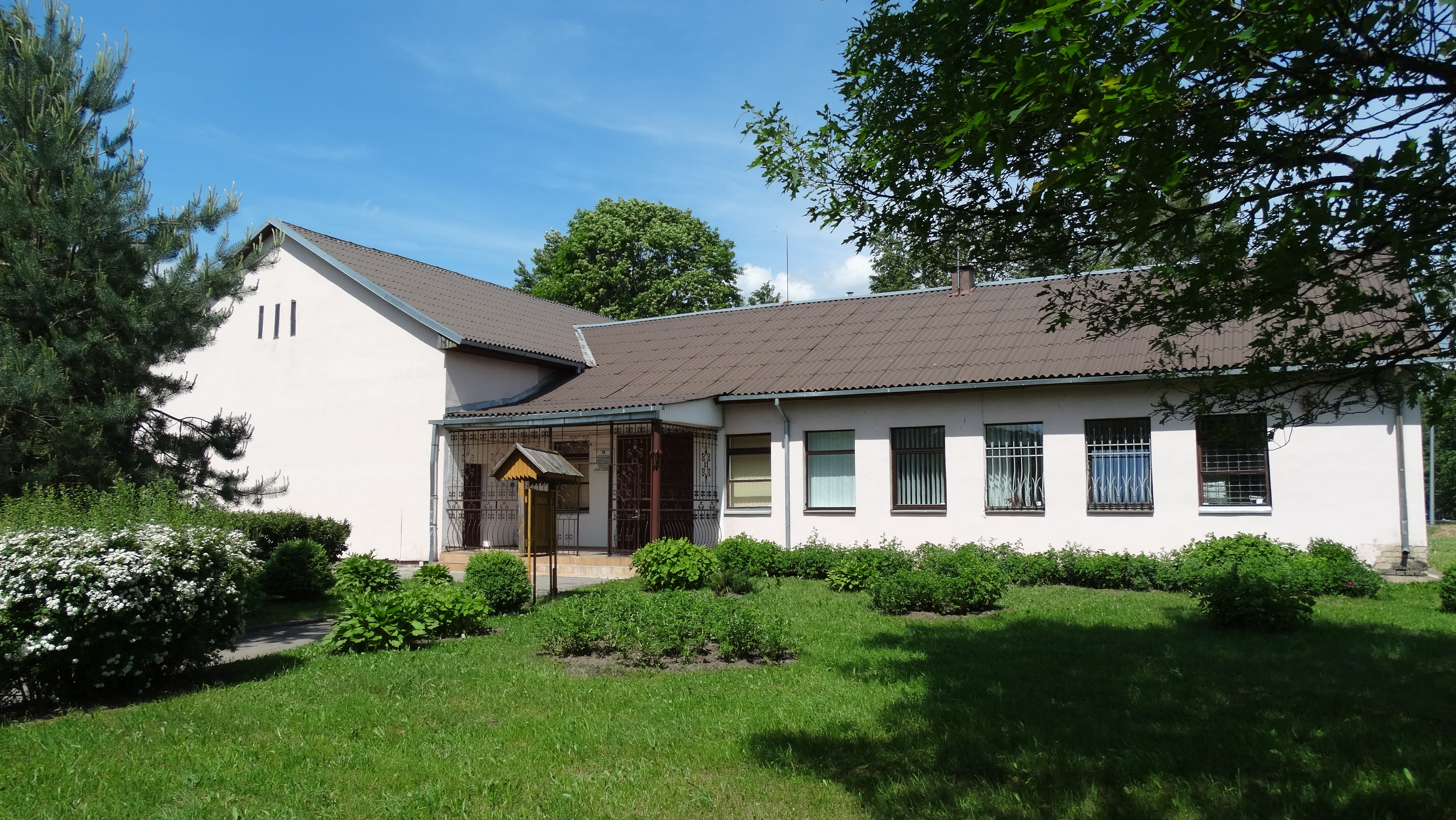
Eldership administrative building in Dūkštos, 2016

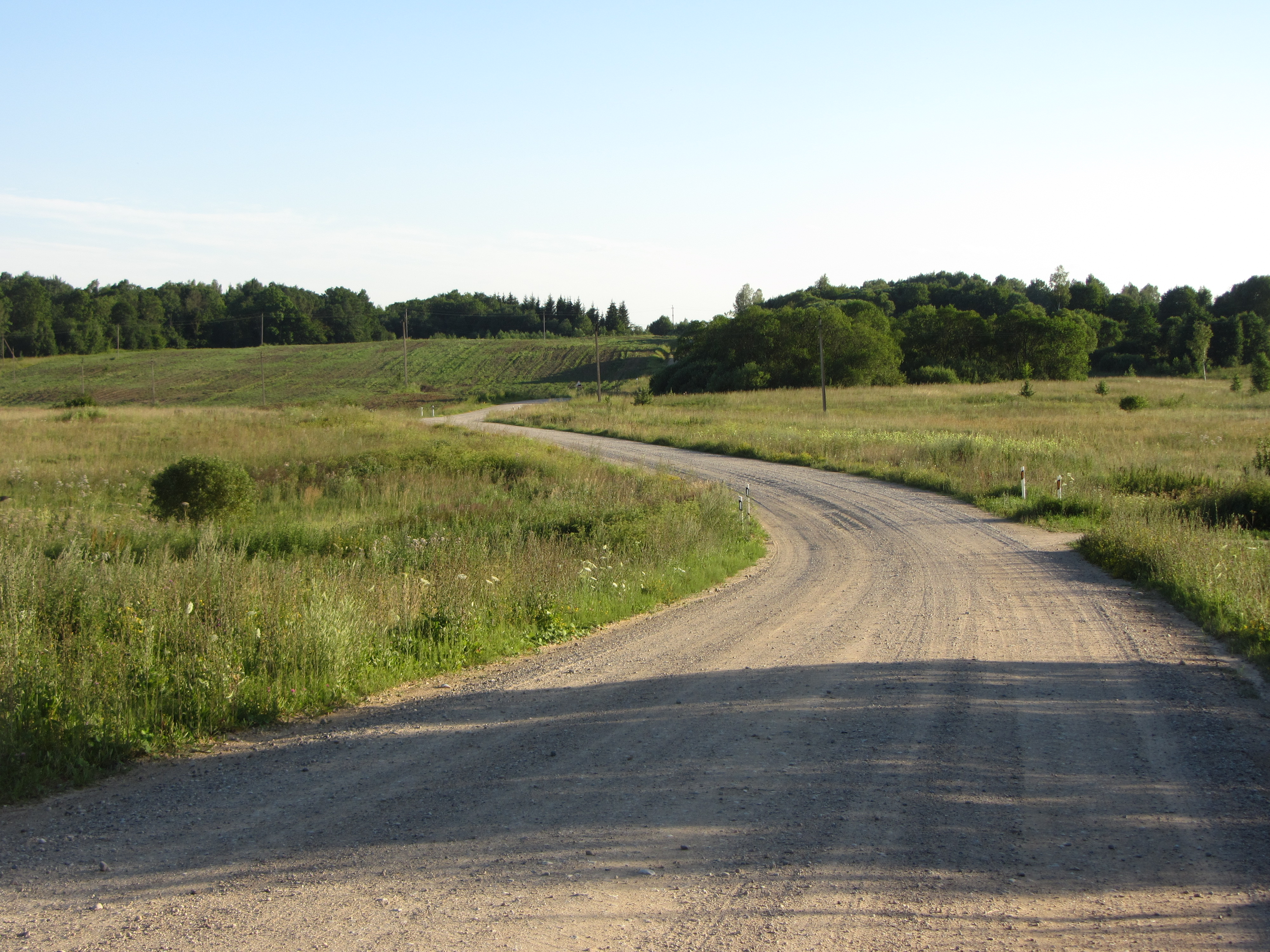
A rural road in the area

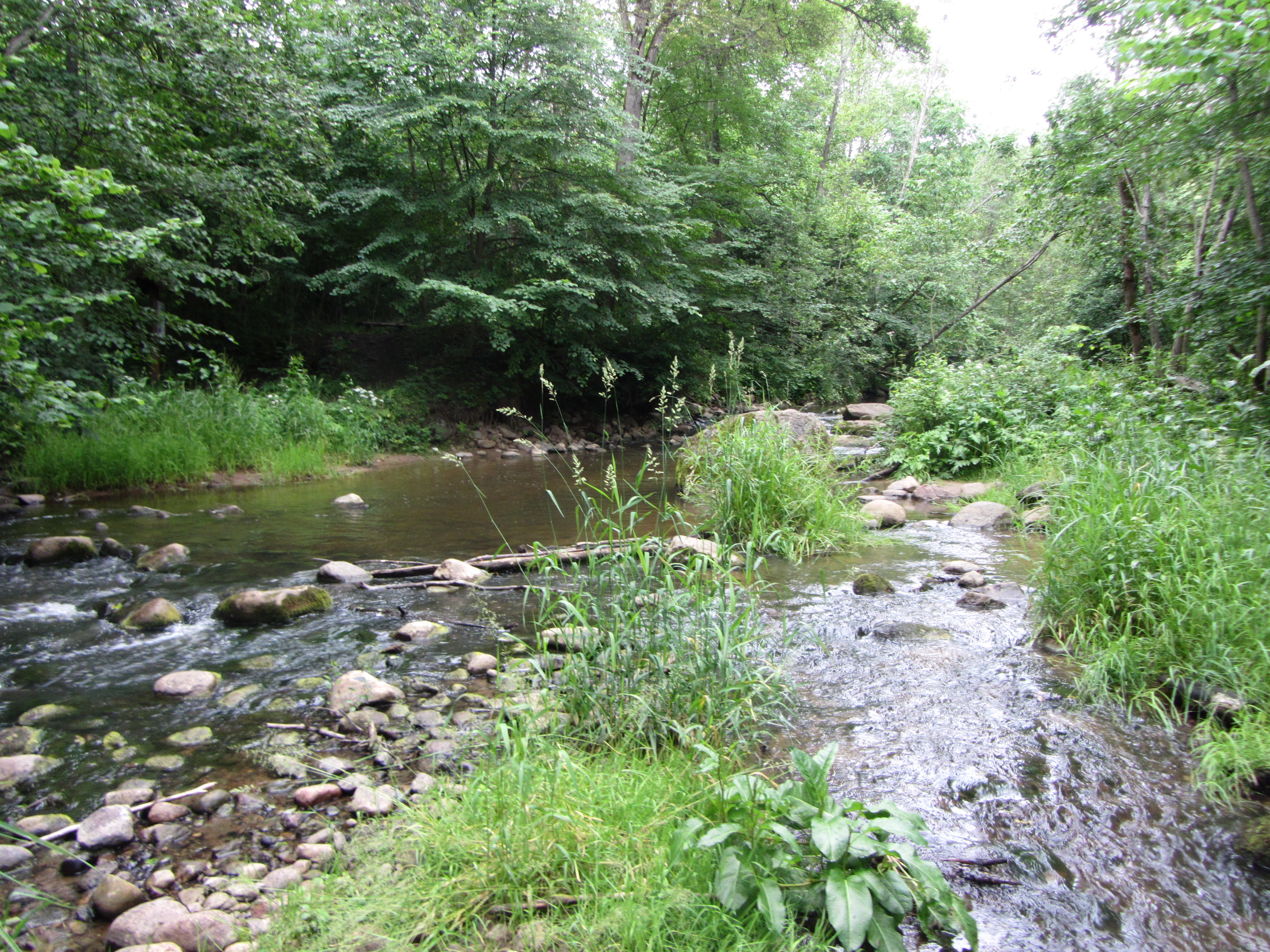
Dūkšta river

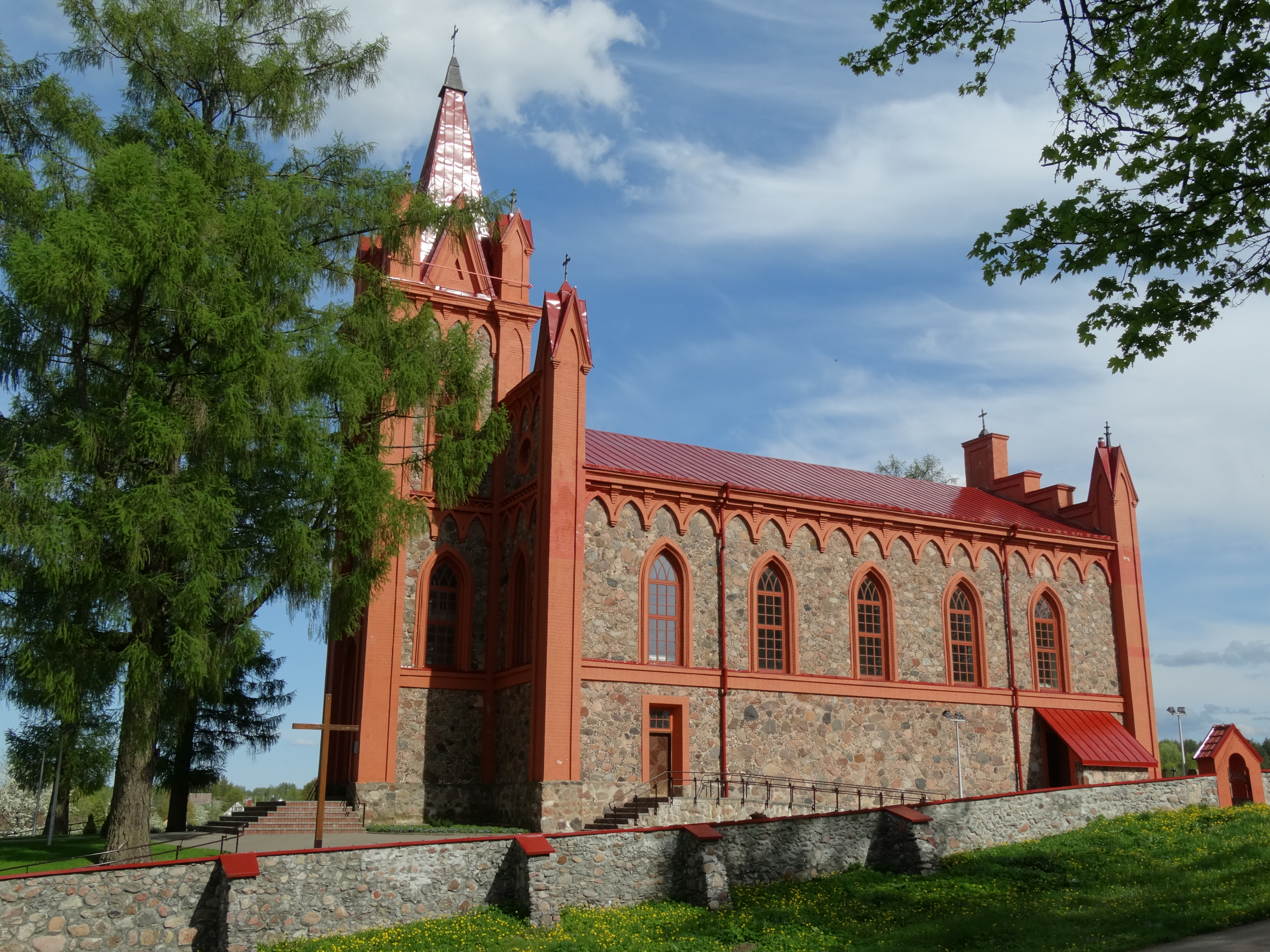
Church of Dūkštos

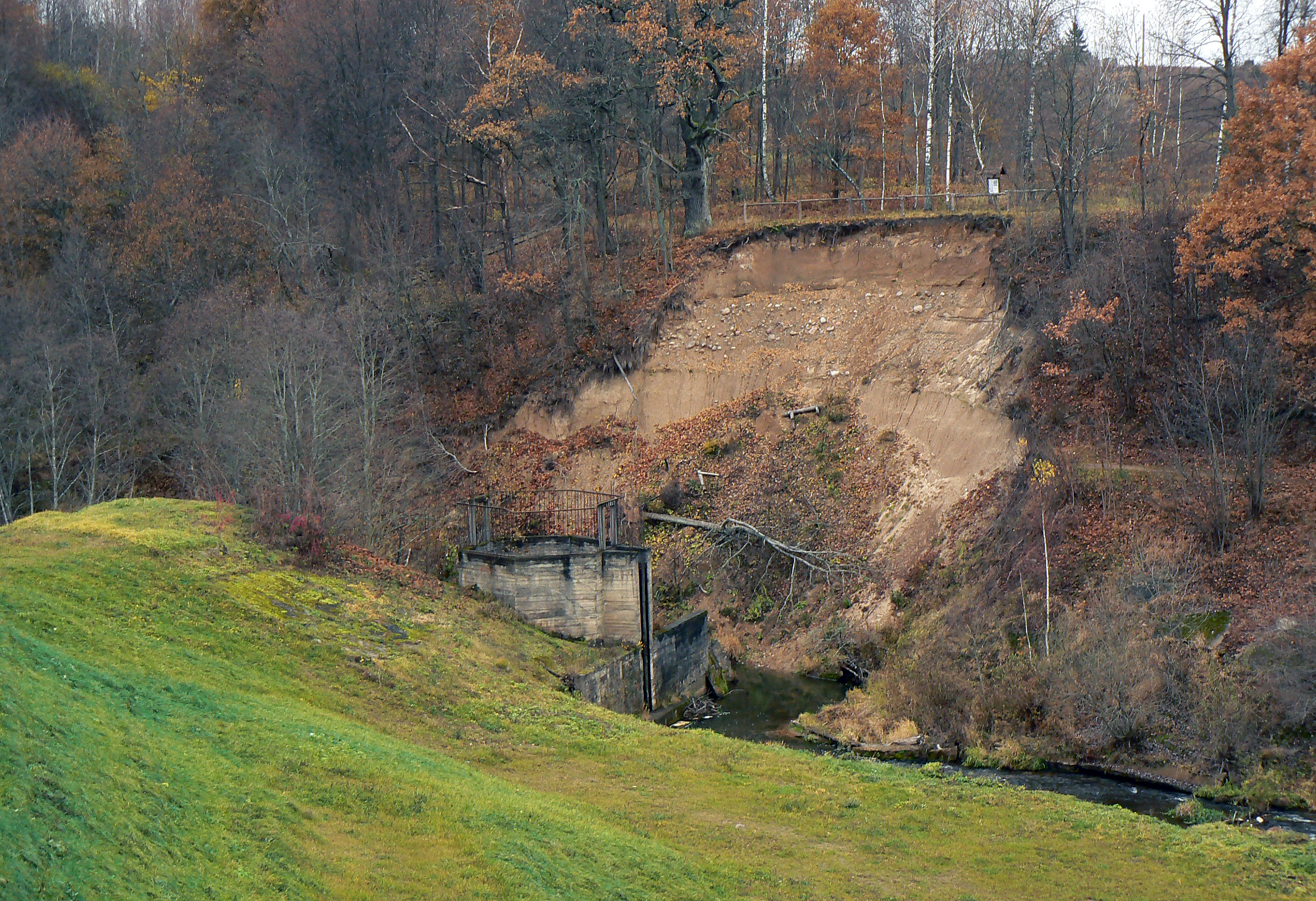
Dūkštos outcrop in 2011

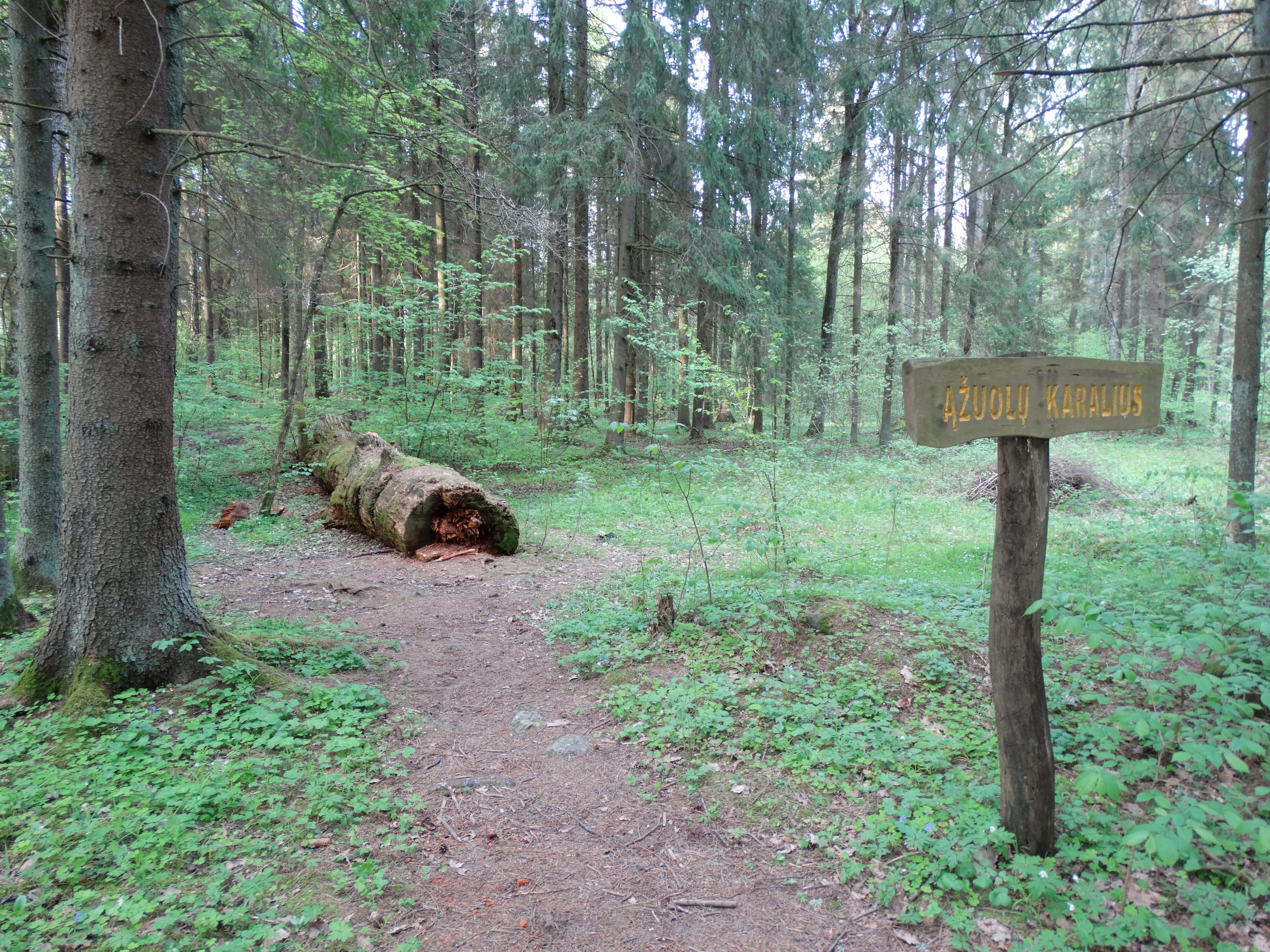
The King of Oaks in Dūkštos oak grove

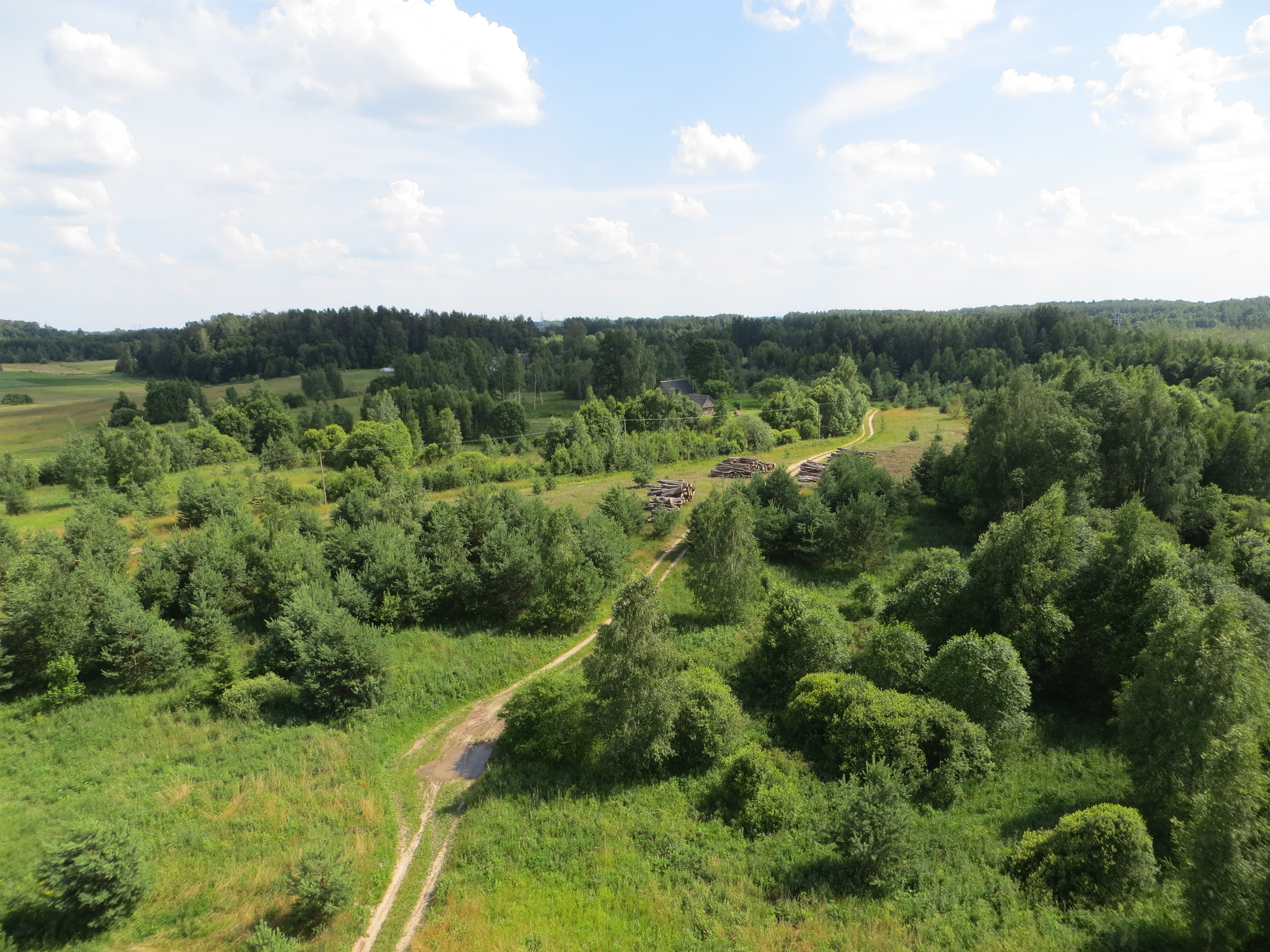
Dūkštos landscape

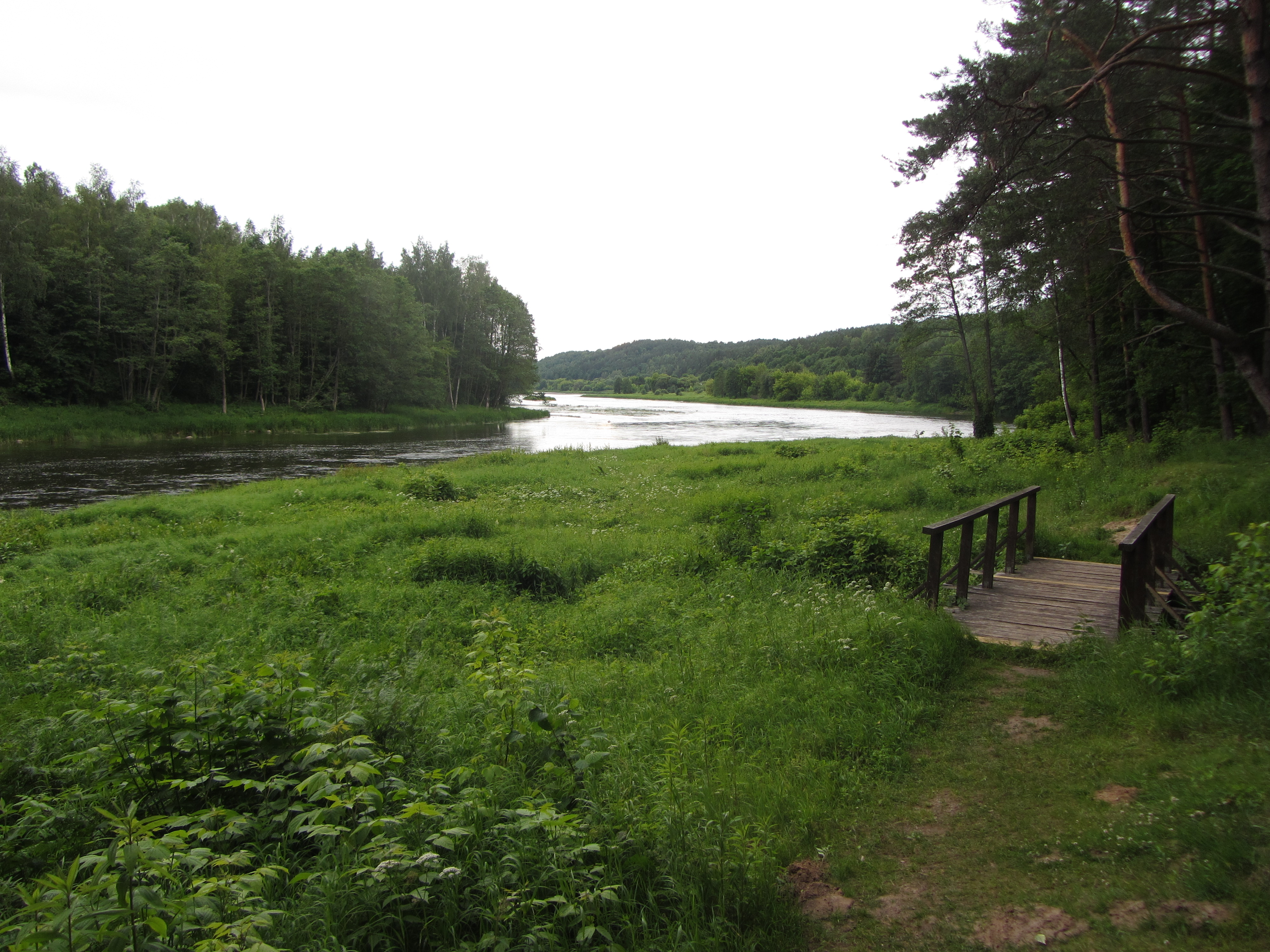
Neris in Neris Regional Park
