= Airėnai II =

- Village
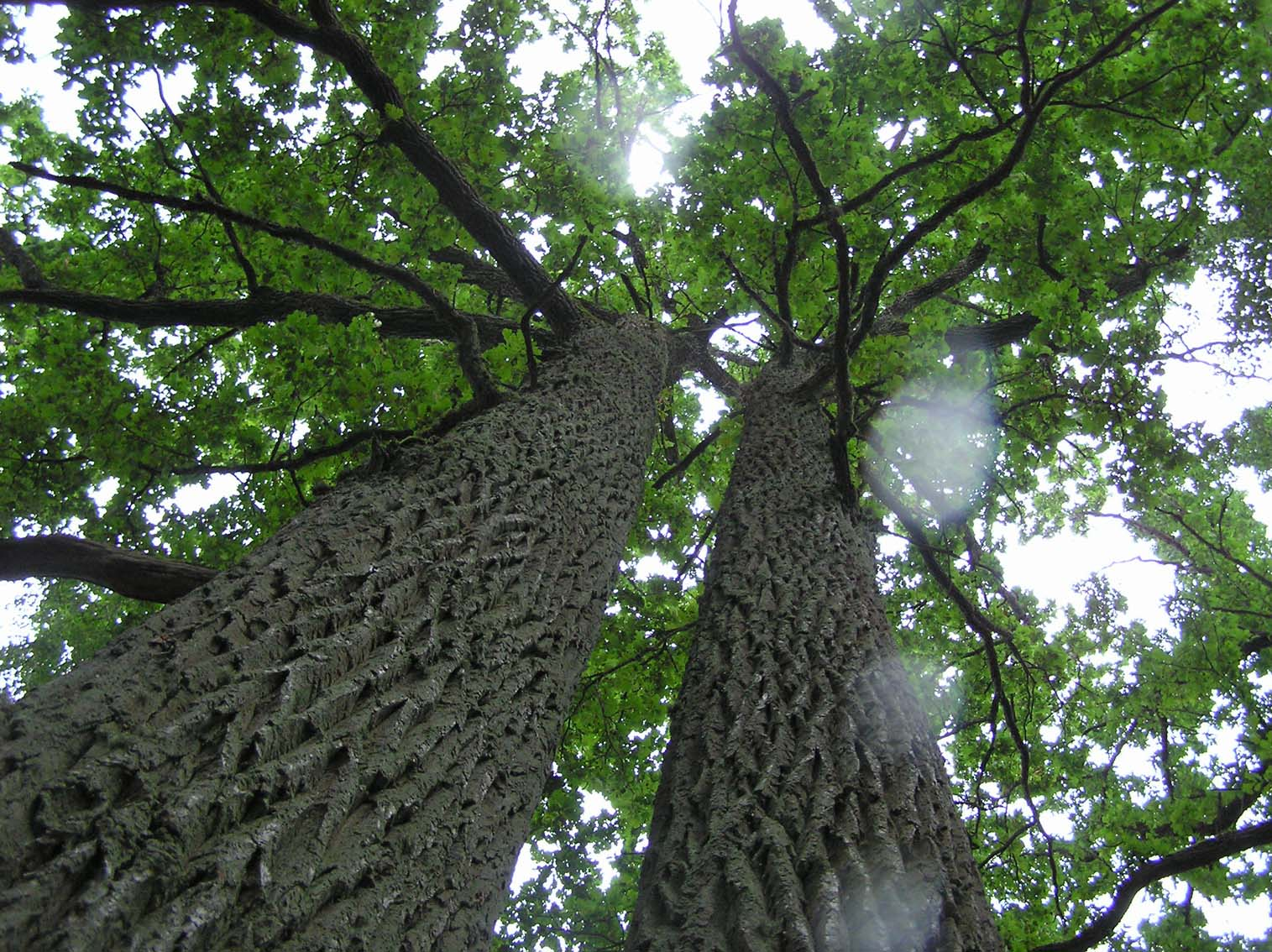
- Largest in Lithuania natural oak forest near Airėnai II

- Location of Airėnai II
- Coordinates: 54°51′00″N 24°57′00″E
- Country: Lithuania
- County: Vilnius County
- Municipality: Vilnius District Municipality
- Eldership: Dūkštos eldership

Population (2011)
  - Total: 83
- Time zone: UTC+2 (EET)
  - Summer (DST): UTC+3 (EEST)

Airėnai II is a village located in the Vilnius District Municipality. It is part of the Neris Regional Park. According to the census of 2011, the village has a population of 110, a decrease from 257 in 1959. Airėnai I village is located nearby.

== History ==
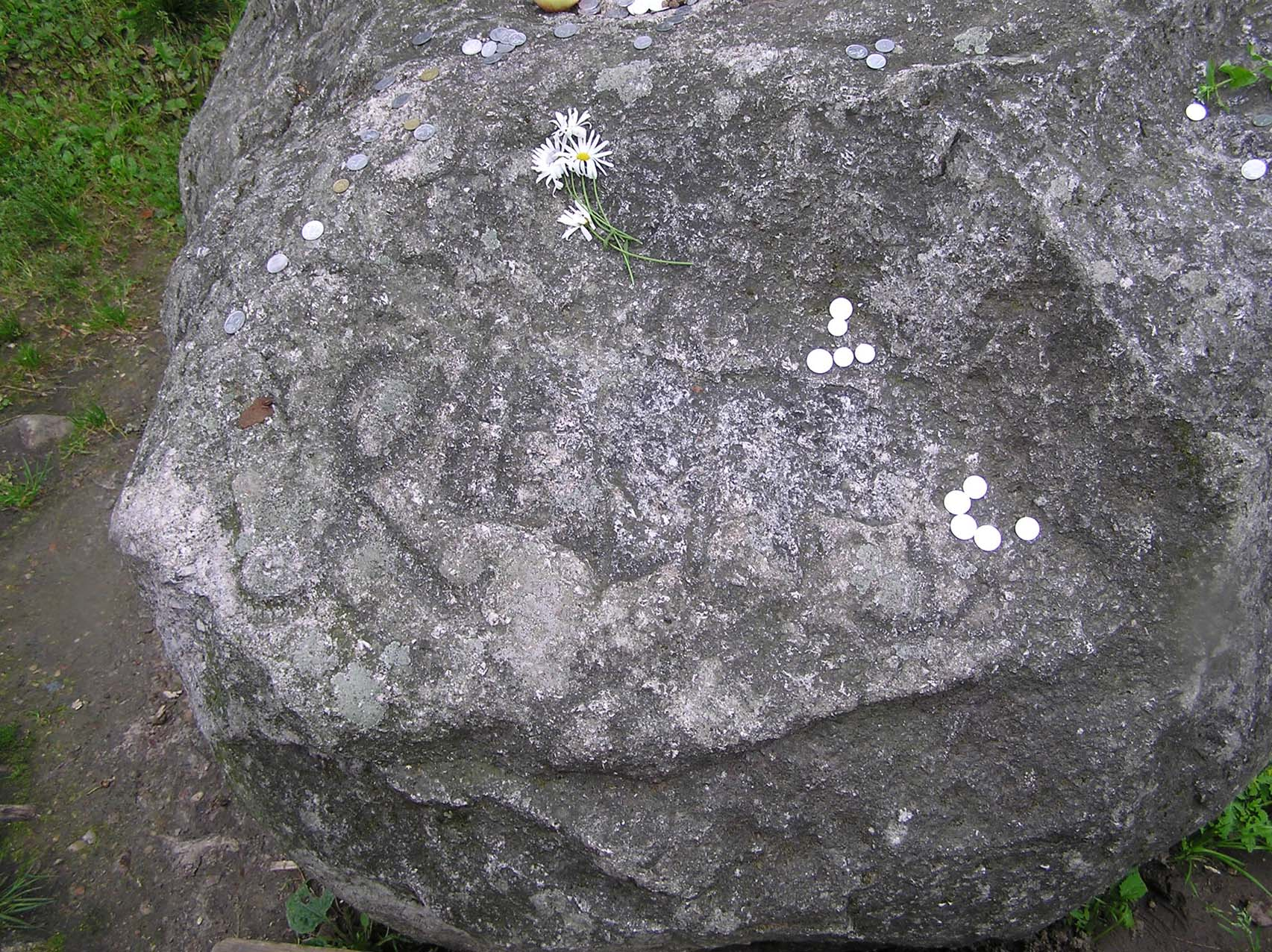
Airėnai runic stone with inscriptions

Airėnai II village was established in the early 20th century when Eastern Orthodox Ukrainians resettled in Airėnai I and Geisiškės. These Ukrainians were originally from Volhynia but moved to the vicinity of Brest in the second half of the 19th century (see Geisiškės for migration history). Dukštos oak forest with a 2.2-kilometre (1.4 mi) walkway and Bradeliškės or Airėnai stone with undecipherable runes is located near the village. In the Neris river, there is a conglomerate stone named after the village.
