= Airėnai I =

- Village
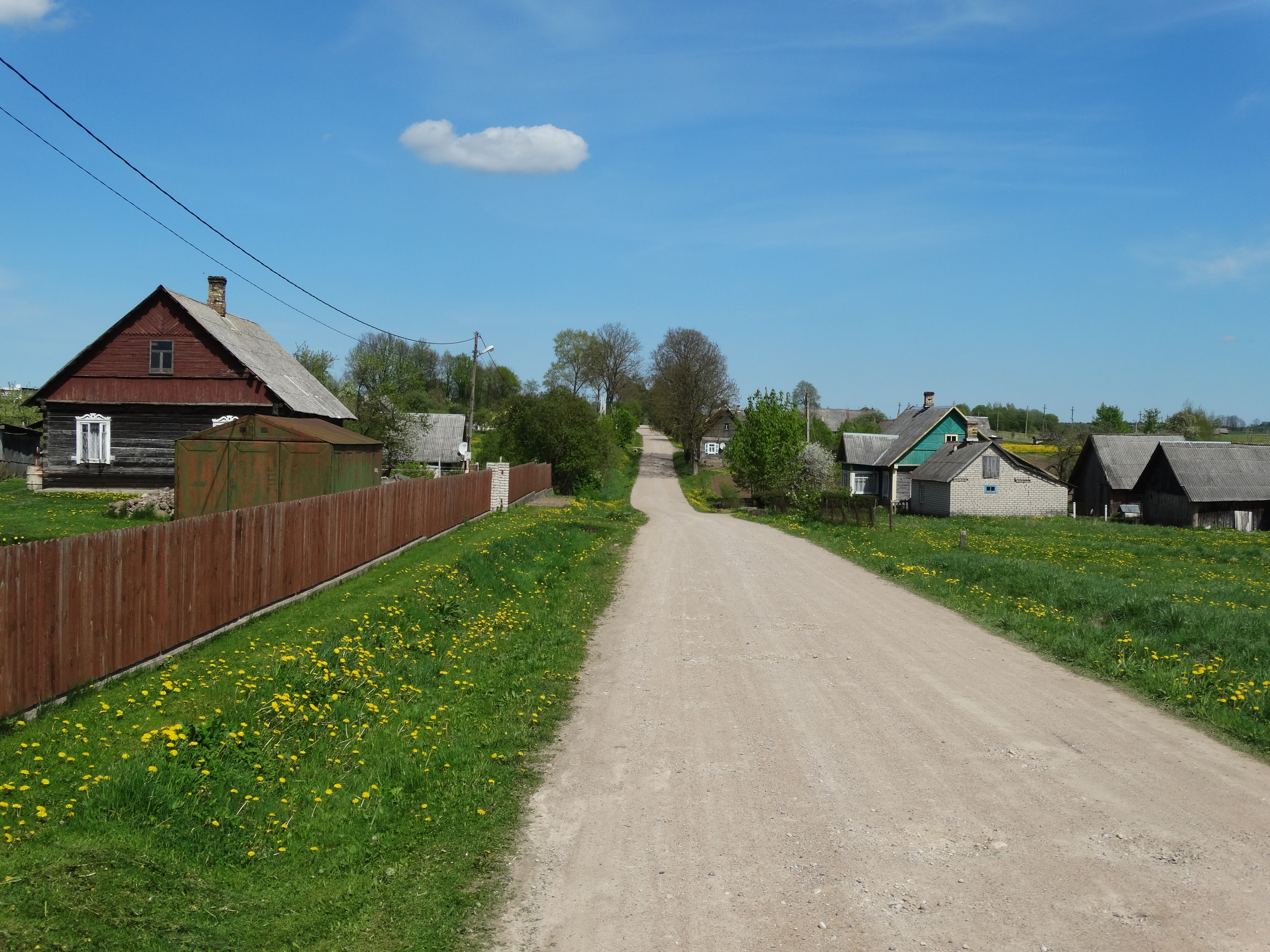
- Street in Airėnai

- Location of Airėnai I
- Coordinates: 54°50′20″N 24°55′19″E
- Country: Lithuania
- County: Vilnius County
- Municipality: Vilnius District Municipality
- Eldership: Dūkštos eldership

Population (2011)
  - Total: 83
- Time zone: UTC+2 (EET)
  - Summer (DST): UTC+3 (EEST)

Airėnai I is a village located in the Vilnius District Municipality. It is part of the Neris Regional Park. According to the census of 2011, the village has a population of 83, a decrease from 112 in 1984. Airėnai II village is located nearby.

== History ==
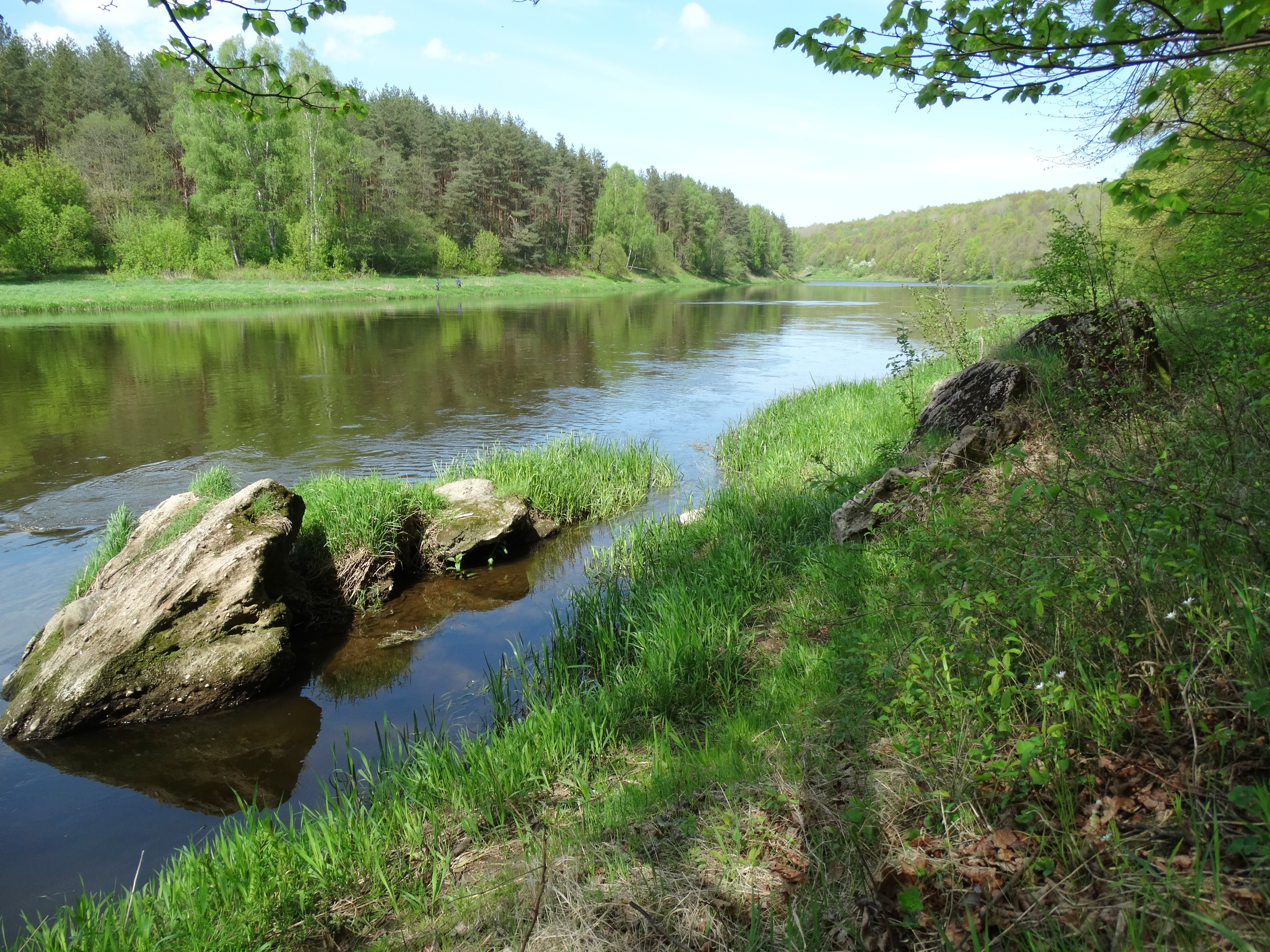
Airėnai conglomerate in Neris

In the early 19th century, Airėnai estate belonged to the Dukes Giedraičiai. In 1860, Airėnai was briefly described by Władysław Syrokomla in his ethnographic study of the environs of Vilnius city. He wrote:

Rich village houses, convenient tavern. People are well-off in this village.

— Władysław Syrokomla, Wycieczki po Litwie w promieniach od Wilna

In 1864, there were eight houses in Airėnai village and 44 inhabitants: eight were Eastern Orthodox (see Geisiškės for migration history) and 36 Catholics. Dukštos oak forest with a 2.2-kilometre (1.4 mi) walkway and Bradeliškės or Airėnai stone with undecipherable runes is located near the village. In the Neris river, there is a conglomerate stone named after the village.
