= Karmazinai =

- Village
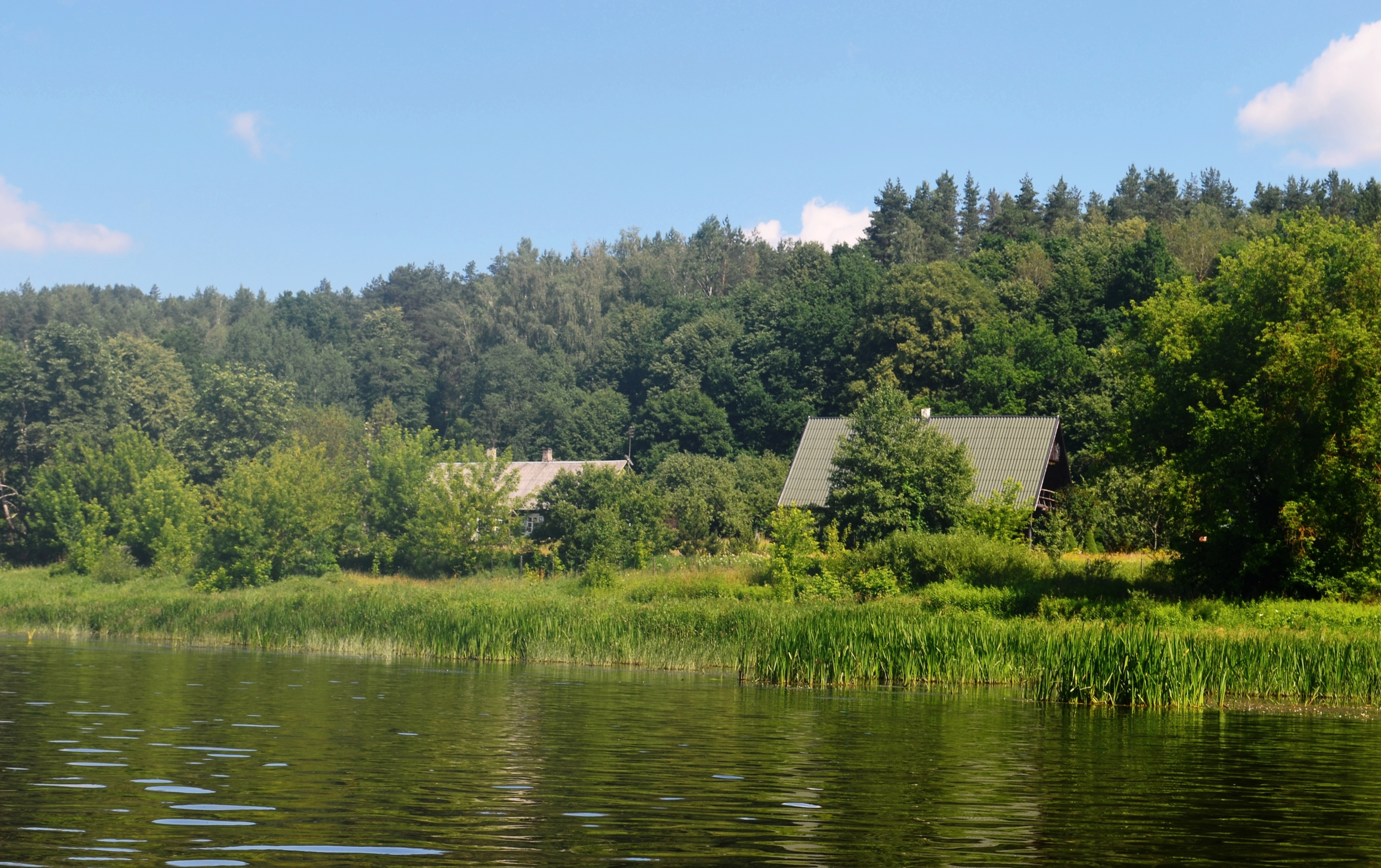

- Location within Lithuania
- Coordinates: 54°49′01″N 24°55′54″E
- Country: Lithuania
- Ethnographic region: Dzūkija
- County: Vilnius County
- Municipality: Vilnius district municipality
- Eldership: Dūkštas eldership

Population (2021)
  - Total: 4
- Time zone: UTC+2 (EET)
  - Summer (DST): UTC+3 (EEST)

Karmazinai is a village in Vilnius district municipality, Lithuania. It is situated on the right bank of Neris River, by forest, part of the Neris Regional Park. There is an ancient burial mound and hill fort (Karmazinai mound) about 0.8 km northwest of the village.
