= Bradeliškės Hillfort =

Bradeliškės hillfort
- Location within Lithuania
- Coordinates: 54°49′30″N 24°56′35″E
- Country: Lithuania
- Ethnographic region: Dzūkija
- County: Vilnius County
- Municipality: Vilnius district municipality
- Eldership: Dūkštos Eldership
- Time zone: UTC+2 (EET)
  - Summer (DST): UTC+3 (EEST)

The Bradeliškės hill fort (also called Pakilta ) is a hill fort (piliakalnis) in Vilnius district municipality, Lithuania.

== Details ==
The hill fort is situated near the Bradeliškės village and on the left bank of the Dūkšta River, close to its confluence with Neris. It is within the Neris Regional Park territory.

It was once a wooden castle with surrounding fortifications.

In June 2023, Bradeliškės hillfort was added to the national register as a protected area of national significance.

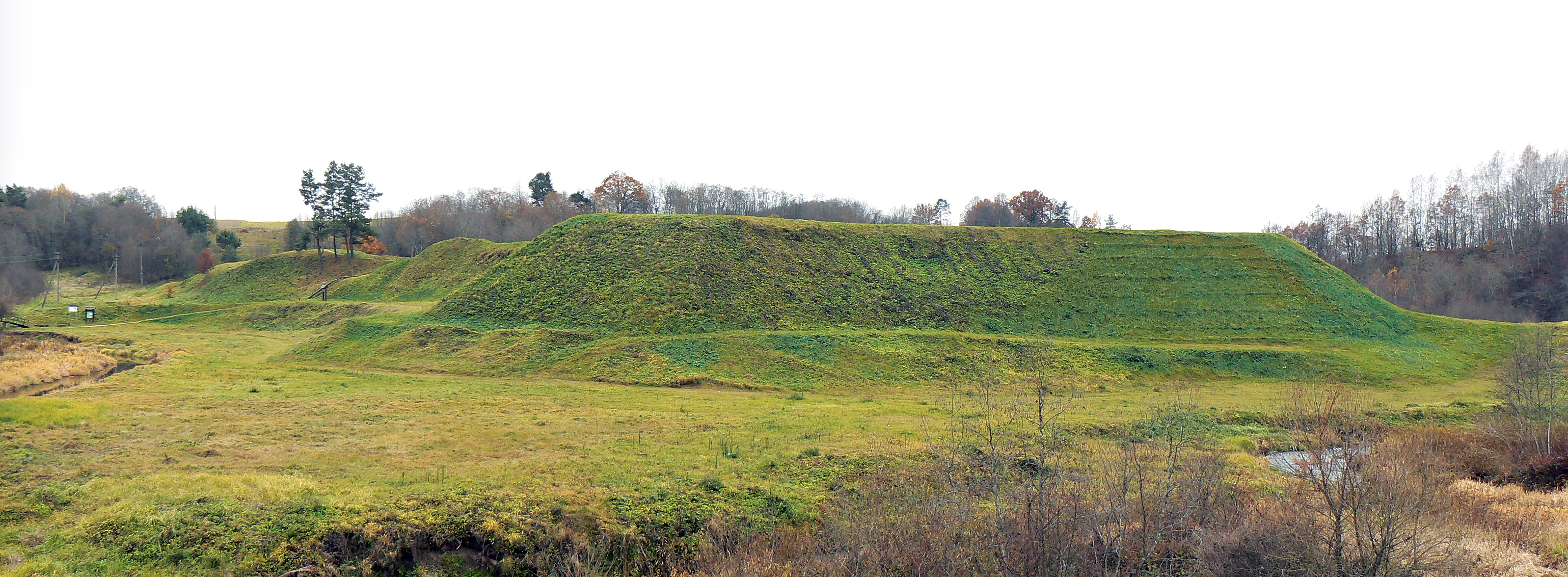
Bradeliškės hillfort from the north

== See also ==
- List of hillforts in Lithuania
