= Geisiškės =

- Village
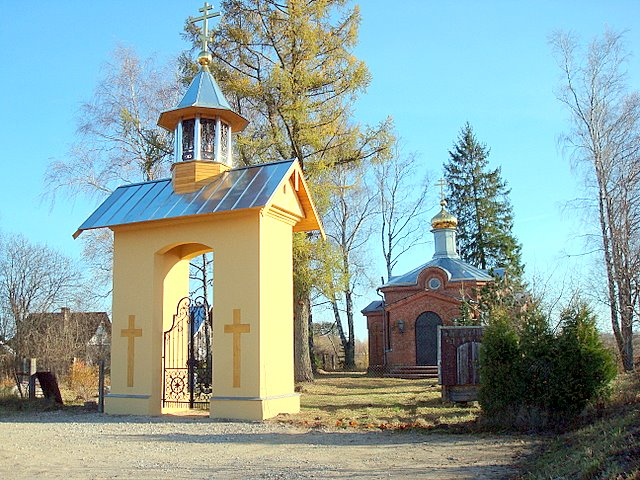
- Orthodox Church in Geisiškės

- Location of Geisiškės
- Coordinates: 54°43′55″N 25°02′46″E
- Country: Lithuania
- County: Vilnius County
- Municipality: Vilnius District Municipality
- Eldership: Dūkštos eldership

Population (2011)
  - Total: 286
- Time zone: UTC+2 (EET)
  - Summer (DST): UTC+3 (EEST)

Geisiškės is a village located near Kernavė town in the Vilnius District Municipality. According to the census of 2011, the village has a population of 286, an increase from 248, counted by the 2001 census. Most of the inhabitants of Geisiškės are of Ukrainian descent. Together with the nearby Airėnai I and Airėnai II villages, it forms an Eastern Orthodox enclave in a Catholic countryside.

== History ==
In 1860, Geisiškės was briefly described by Władysław Syrokomla in his ethnographic study of the environs of Vilnius city. He writes:

On the right, Geisiškės estate with a nice manor with Neo-Gothic features is seen – property of Dukes Giedraičiai. This manor as well as neighboring Europe estate now belongs to the Jesuits.

— Władysław Syrokomla, Wycieczki po Litwie w promieniach od Wilna

In the early 19th century, the first wave of Slavic migrants came to Geisiškės, who established an Orthodox community in 1839. In the middle of the 19th century, there were 30 families of Belarusian settlers from Grodno Governorate in Geisiškės. This community established an Eastern Orthodox church in 1865. In 1903, the second wave of Orthodox migrants came, when first 42 families from Brest settled in the village. These settlers came to Brest in the second half of the 19th century from Volhynia, Ukraine, but in 1900 Nicholas II of Russia ordered the construction of a new artillery bombing range for Brest Fortress, thus inhabitants of nearby villages had to be resettled. The Tsar offered for these Ukrainians return to Volhynia, relocate to Siberia or chose a place in Trakai County of the Vilnius Governorate, and they chose the latter. Before World War I, in Geisiškės, Airėnai I and Airėnai II there were 173 Ukrainian families of this second wave migration. In 1946, Geisiškės Orthodox parish counted 642 members. During the Soviet period, local kolkhoz was rich and advanced, compared to others and shown as exemplary. After a wave of migration of local inhabitants to Vilnius in the second half of the 20th century, Geisiškės benefits from its proximity to both Vilnius and touristic Kernavė.
