= Bareikiškės =

- Village
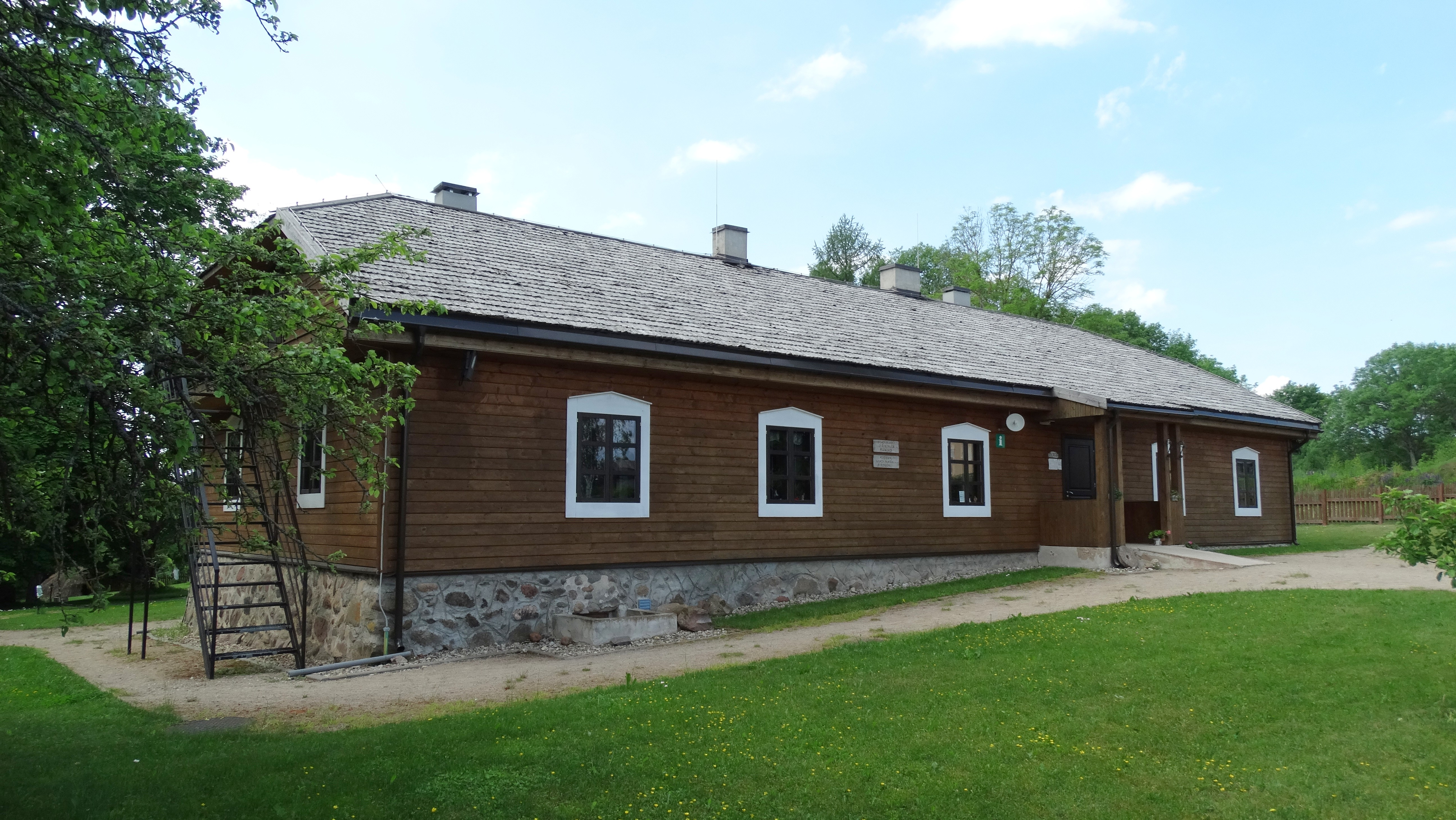
- A museum of Władysław Syrokomla

- Location of Bareikiškės
- Coordinates: 54°36′47″N 25°28′01″E
- Country: Lithuania
- County: Vilnius County
- Municipality: Vilnius district municipality
- Eldership: Rukainiai eldership

Population (2011)
  - Total: 78
- Time zone: UTC+2 (EET)
  - Summer (DST): UTC+3 (EEST)

Bareikiškės is a village in Vilnius district municipality, Lithuania. According to the 2011 census, it had population of 78. There is a library and cottage-like block of flats in Bareikiškės. A museum of Władysław Syrokomla in a manor, that belonged to him, is situated in Bareikiškės. Stanisław Moniuszko was a frequent visitor of Bareikiškės manor.
