= Karmazinai Hillfort =

Karmazinai mound
- Location within Lithuania
- Coordinates: 54°49′09″N 24°55′52″E
- Country: Lithuania
- Ethnographic region: Dzūkija
- County: Vilnius County
- Municipality: Vilnius district municipality
- Eldership: Dūkštos Eldership
- Time zone: UTC+2 (EET)
  - Summer (DST): UTC+3 (EEST)

The Karmazinai mound (also called Viršupis) is a hill fort (piliakalnis) in Vilnius district municipality, Lithuania. It is situated about 0.8 km northwest of the Karmazinai village, 40 m from the right bank of the Dūkšta River, close to its confluence with Neris. The Karmazinai burial mound is located some 1.8 km southeast of the hillfort, about 0.3 km northeast of the village, about 0.2 km northeast of the right bank of the Neris, in the forest.

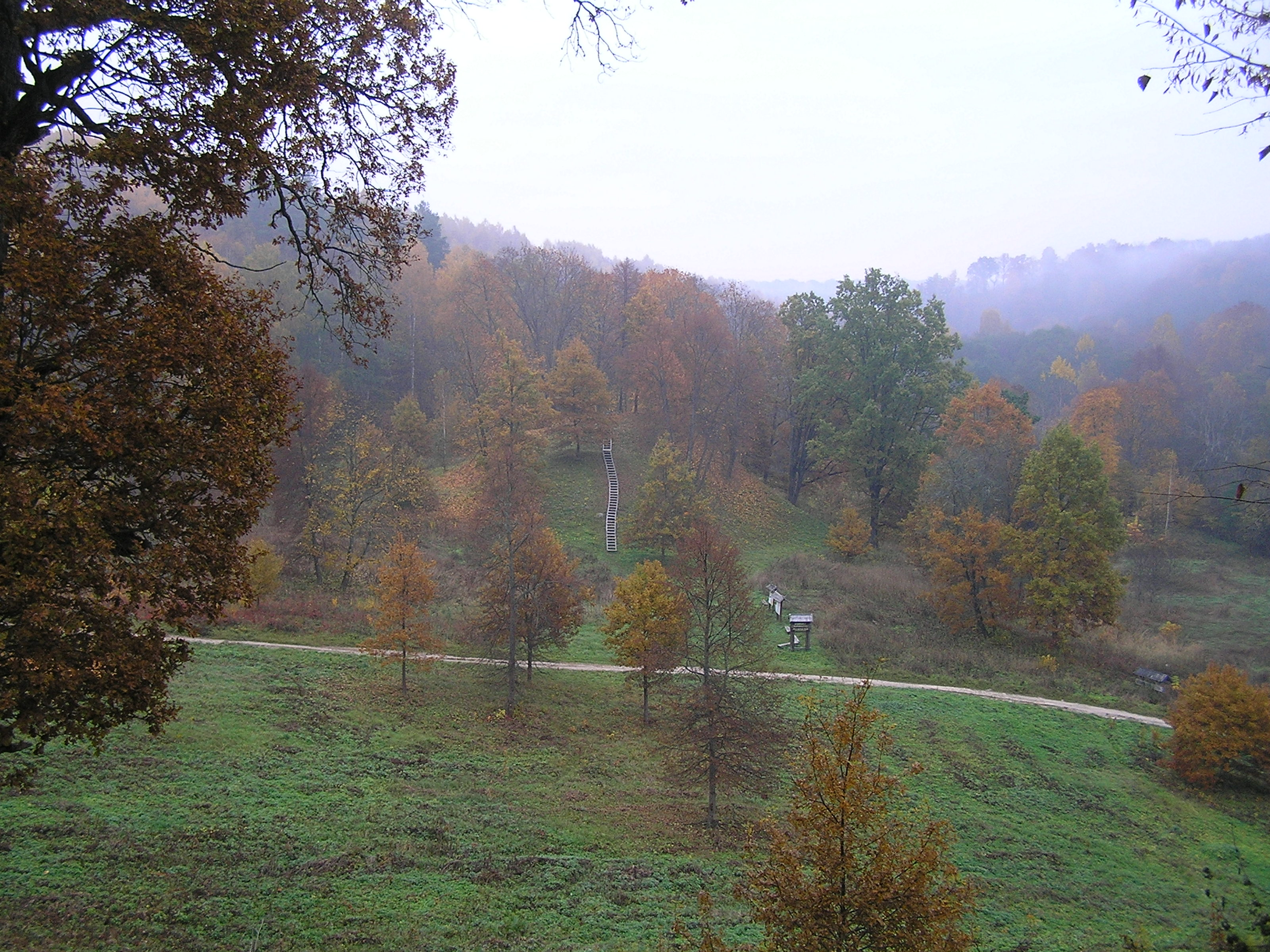
Karmazinai hillfort mound

== See also ==
- List of hillforts in Lithuania
