= Miežionys =

- Village
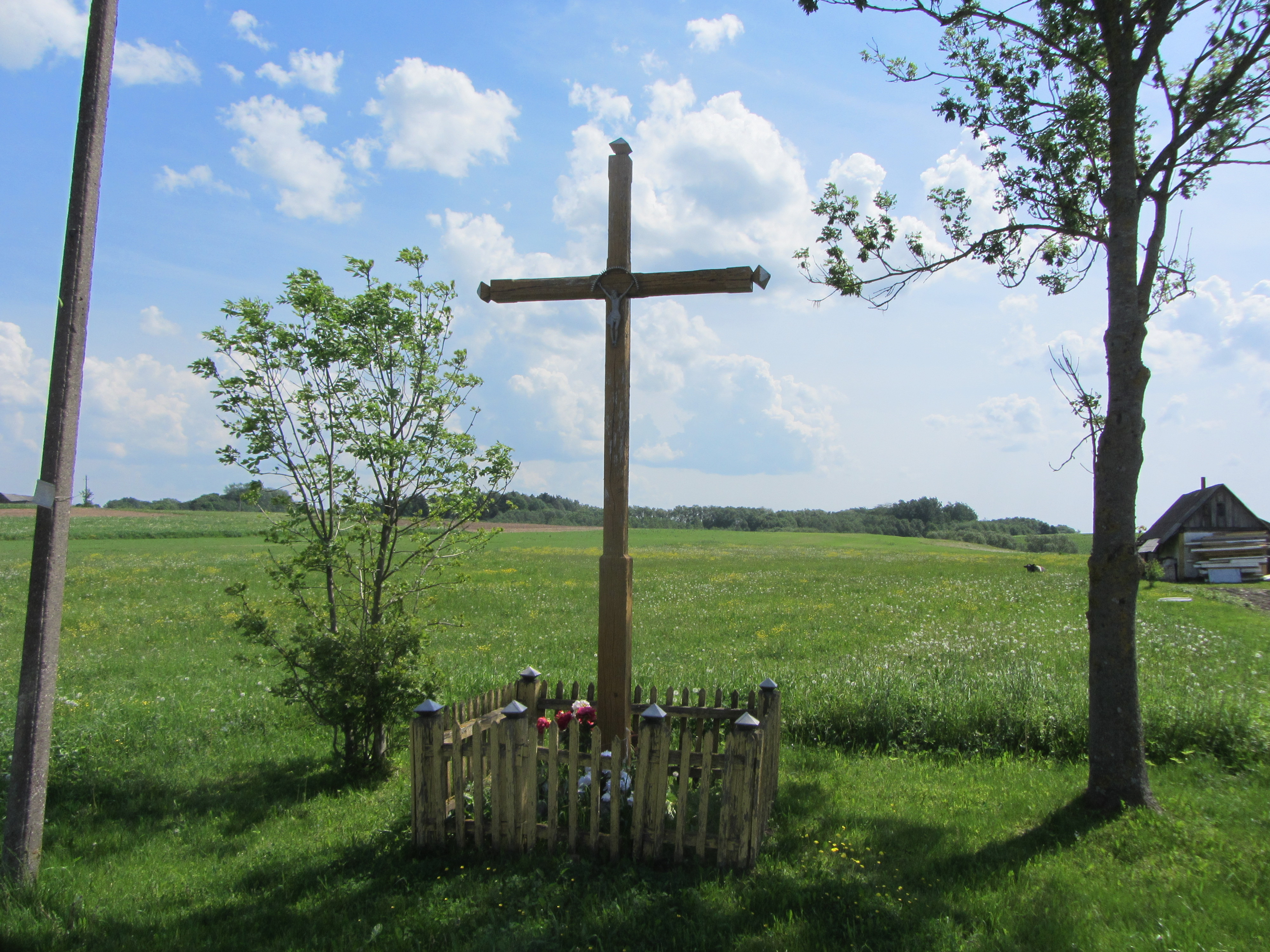

- Location of Miežionys
- Coordinates: 54°51′30″N 24°53′20″E
- Country: Lithuania
- Ethnographic region: Aukštaitija
- County: Vilnius County
- Municipality: Vilnius district municipality
- Eldership: Dūkštai eldership

Population (2011)
  - Total: 92
- Time zone: UTC+2 (EET)
  - Summer (DST): UTC+3 (EEST)

Miežionys (Polish: Mieżańce) is a village in the Vilnius district municipality, Lithuania. According to the 2011 census, its population was 92.

From 1923 to 1939 the village was located in Wilno Voivodeship, in the north-eastern part of the Second Polish Republic. After the Nazi German and Soviet invasions of Poland in September 1939, the village was transferred to Lithuania according to the Soviet–Lithuanian Mutual Assistance Treaty.

During the Nazi occupation in World War II, the village gave assistance to the Jews organised into food gathering groups sent from the Jewish ghetto in Radun, including those who escaped the German massacre of May 10, 1942. Among them was Leon Kahn, who appeared with his father in Mieżańce (Mizhantz) while wandering around the area. The villagers took them in and provided food and assistance. Sarah Fishkin of Rubieżewicze left a diary attesting to repeated acts of kindness by villagers in that area.
