= Dūkštos =

- Village
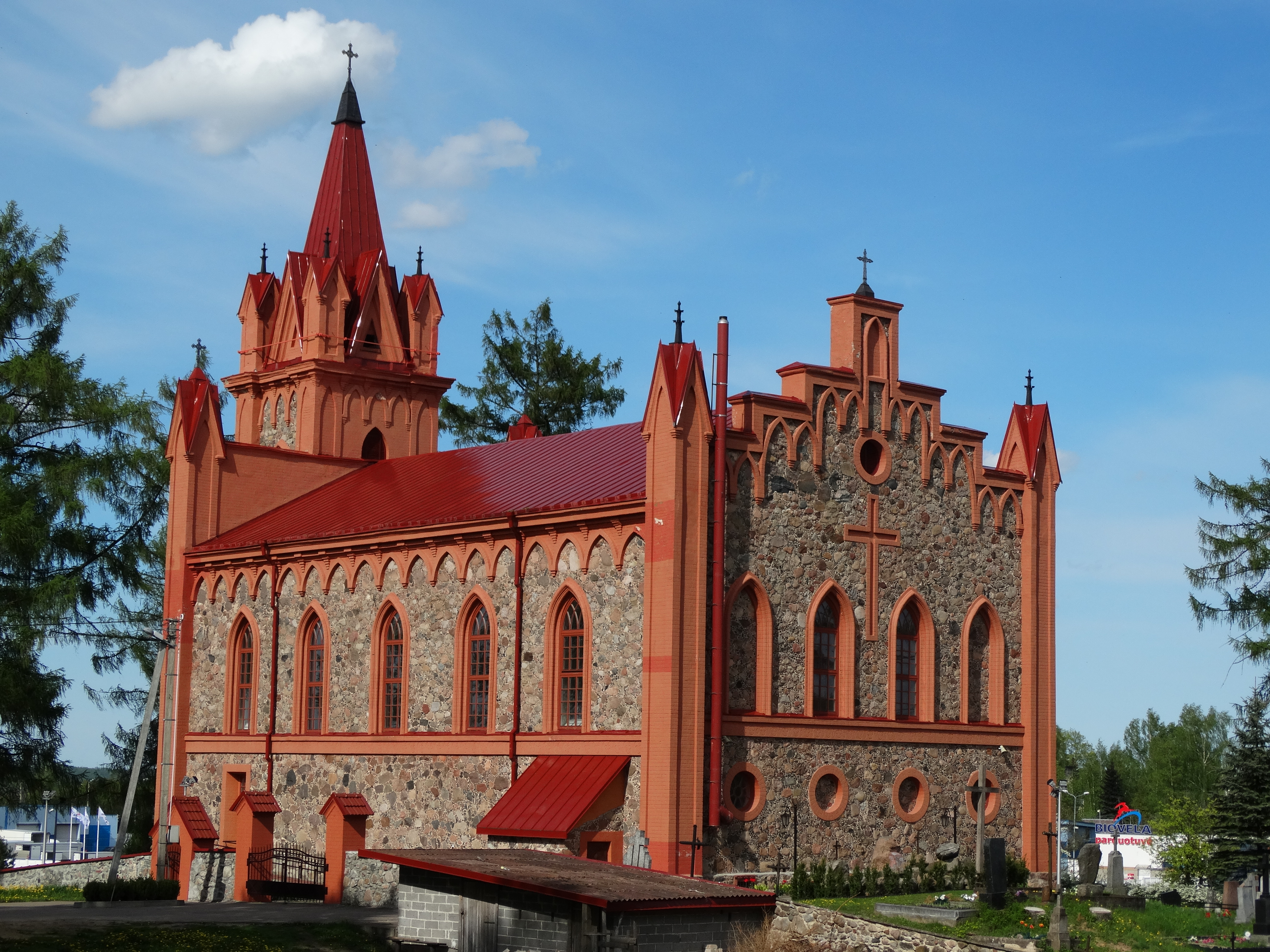
- Church of Dūkštos

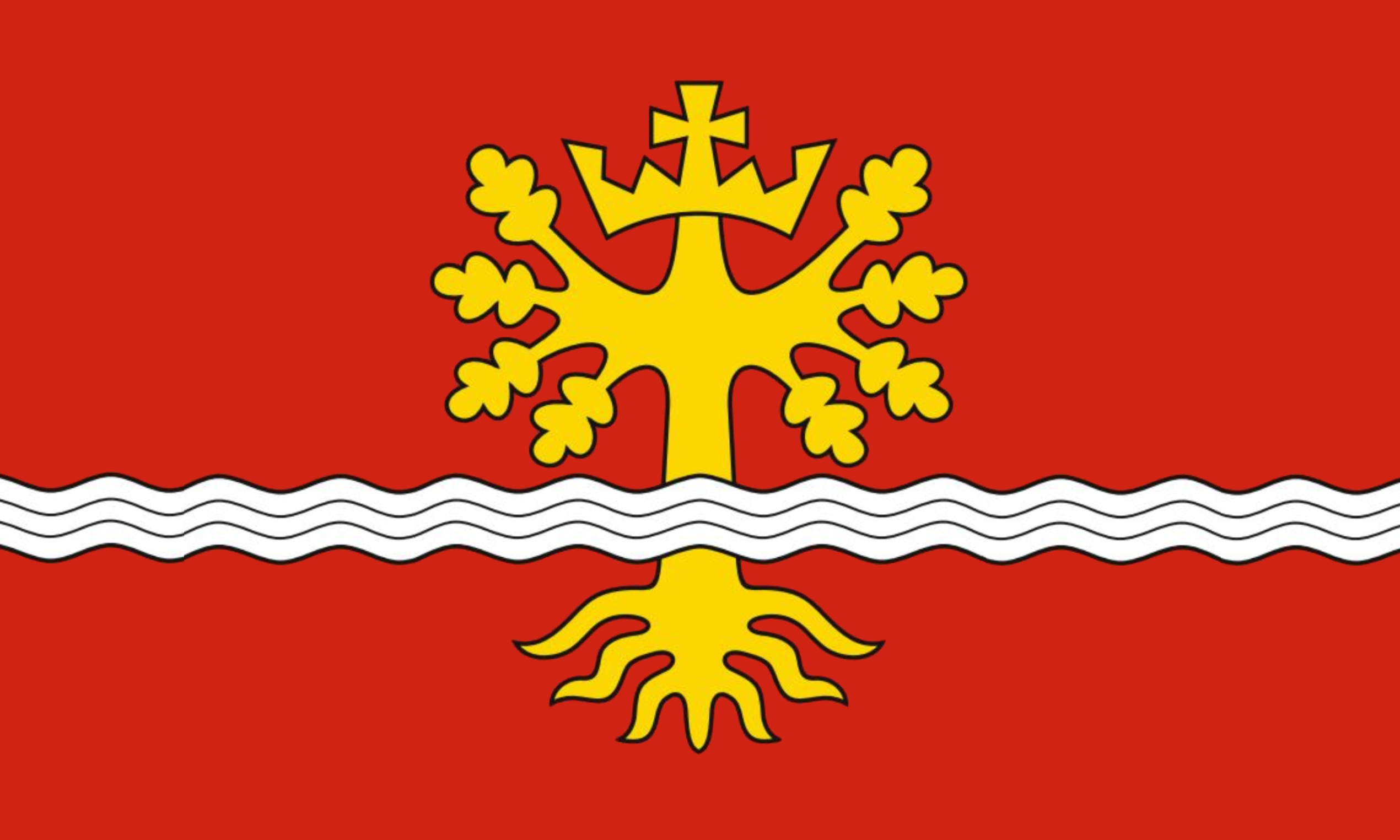
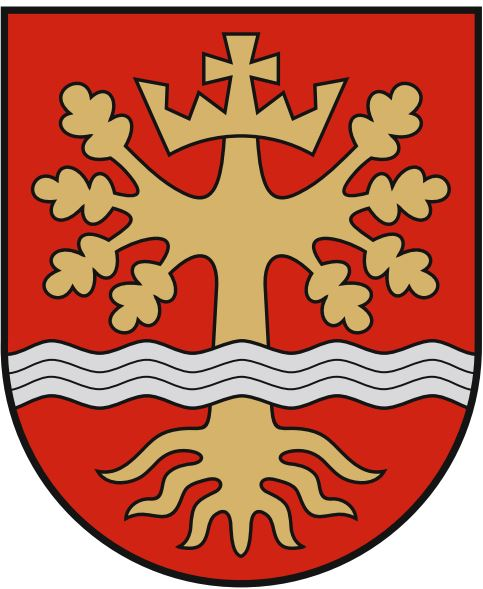
- Flag Seal

- Location within Lithuania
- Coordinates: 54°49′08″N 24°58′00″E
- Country: Lithuania
- County: Vilnius County
- Municipality: Vilnius District Municipality
- Eldership: Dūkštos Eldership
- Capital of: Dūkštos Eldership

Population (2021)
  - Total: 274
- Time zone: UTC+2 (EET)
  - Summer (DST): UTC+3 (EEST)

Dūkštos is a village in Vilnius District Municipality, Lithuania. According to the 2011 census, the village had a population of 311 people, up from 164 in 1979.

== History ==
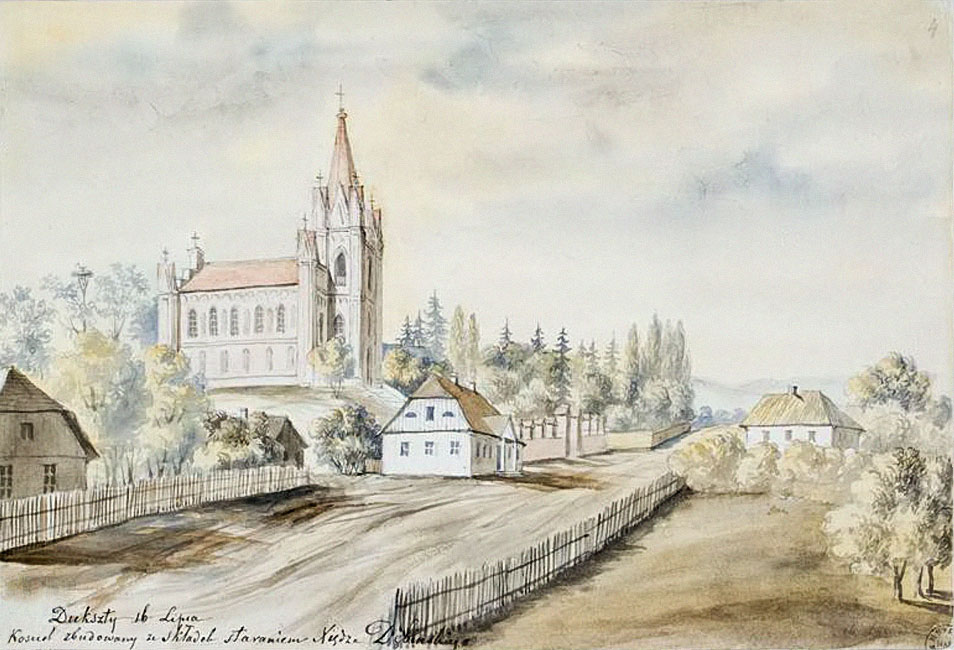
Dūkštos in 1875, a painting by Napoleon Orda

Dūkštos village was mentioned for the first time in 1365 when the Teutonic Order attacked nearby Kernavė and local inhabitants evacuated to Dūkštos. In 1647, a church was built, sponsored by a Lithuanian noblewoman Dorota Giedraitytė-Daubarienė. This church was transferred to the Piarists in 1750. From 1777 to 1939, Dūkštos was known as Piarists' Dūkštos as the village was a center of the Piarists, who established a monastery and a school there. Dūkštos was popular with the Lithuanian Piarists as a resort in the 18th century. Piarists together with the Jesuits were active in the education field, establishing schools and academies. After the closure of other Piarist churches, monasteries, and educational establishments in Lithuania by the authorities of the Russian Empire, the last Piarist provincial and rector moved to Dūkštos. The new Romanticism style Dūkštos stone church designed by Tomasz Tyszecki and Friedrich Gustav von Schacht was built in 1850–1856. Among sponsors of these construction works was the famous composer Stanisław Moniuszko. A painting, that once belonged to Adam Mickiewicz, was brought from Paris and donated to the church. A number of prominent 18th–19th-century Lithuanian Piarists and professors of Vilnius University were buried in the cemetery by the church.
