= Neris Regional Park =

Park in Vilnius County, Lithuania

Coordinates: 54°45′5.67″N 25°13′31.07″E

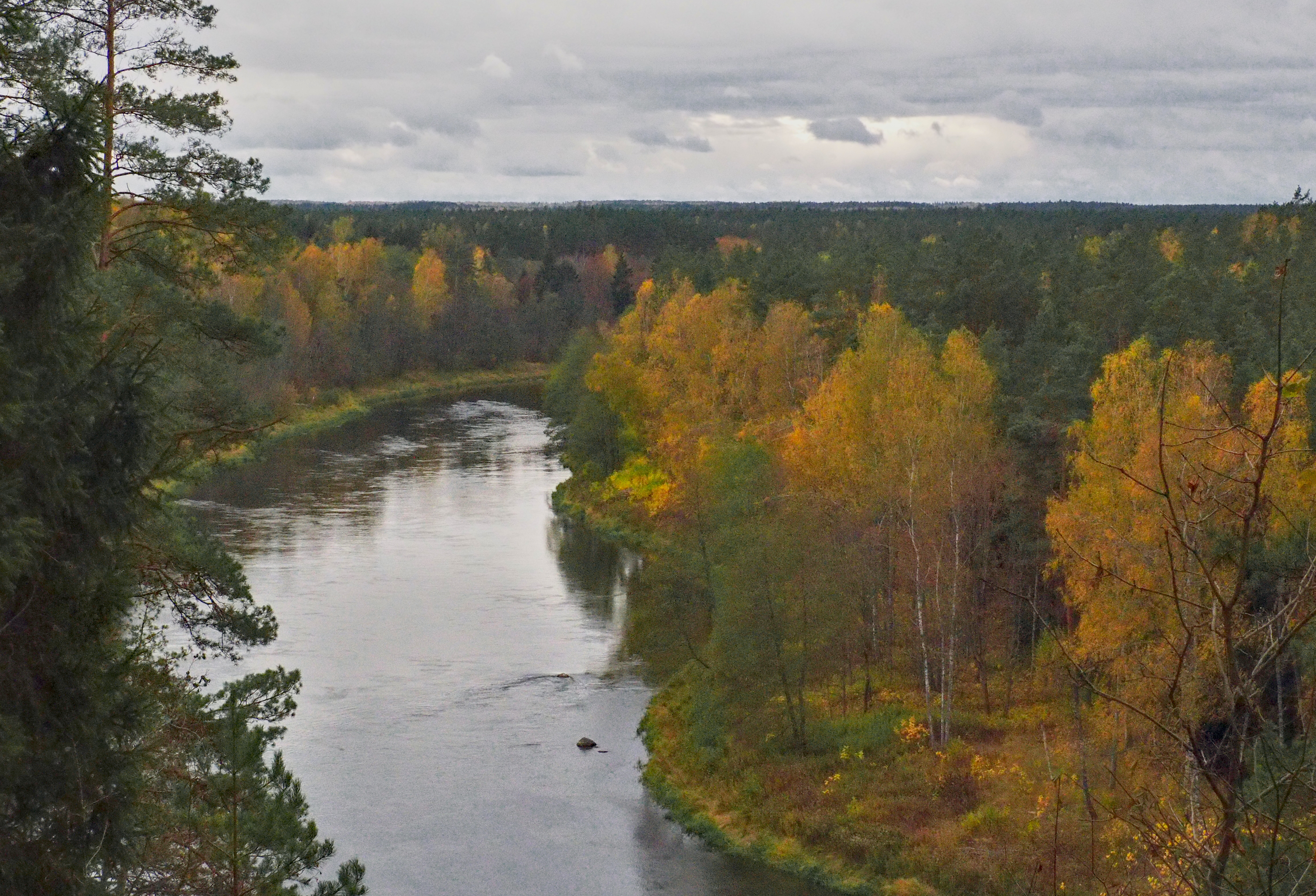

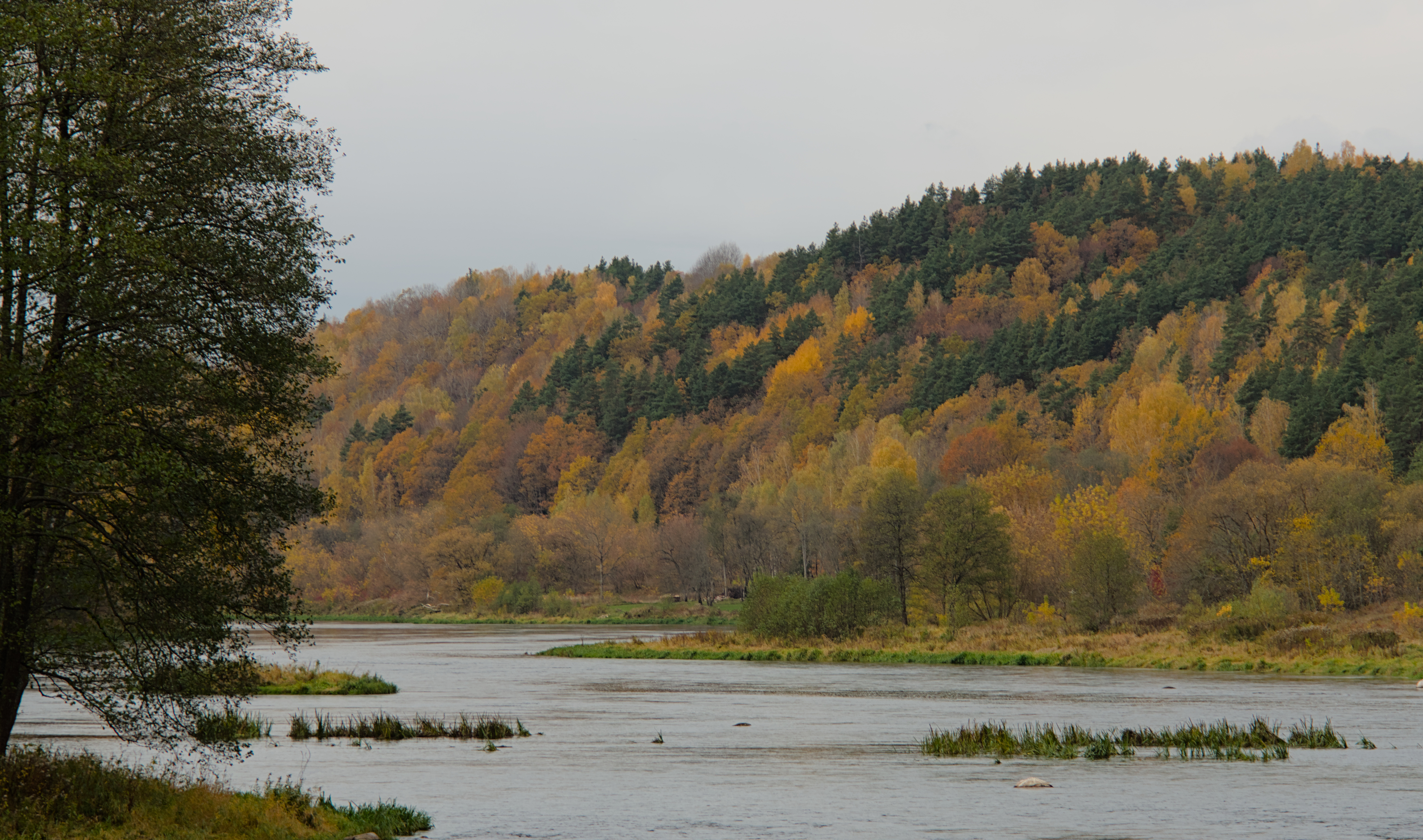

Neris Regional Park was established in 1992 and covers about 10,000 hectares in Lithuania. Its territory lies within the Vilnius district municipality, the Trakai district municipality, and the Elektrėnai municipality. Portions of the park are privately owned. 87% of the territory is covered in forests.

The park is divided into zones, including 11 restricted nature reserves and a cultural reserve. The most heavily wooded of Lithuania's regional parks, it includes one of the largest and oldest surviving stands of oak trees in the country.

The Neris Regional Park encompasses both sides of the river Neris. It is situated in a transition zone between two ecoregions: the Central European mixed forests (PA0412) in the southwest, and the Sarmatic mixed forests (PA0436) in the northeast.
