= Vilnius urban area =

Vilnius urban area Vilniaus aglomeracija
- Urban area
- Lithuanian: Vilniaus miesto tvarios plėtros strategijos įgyvendinimo teritorija
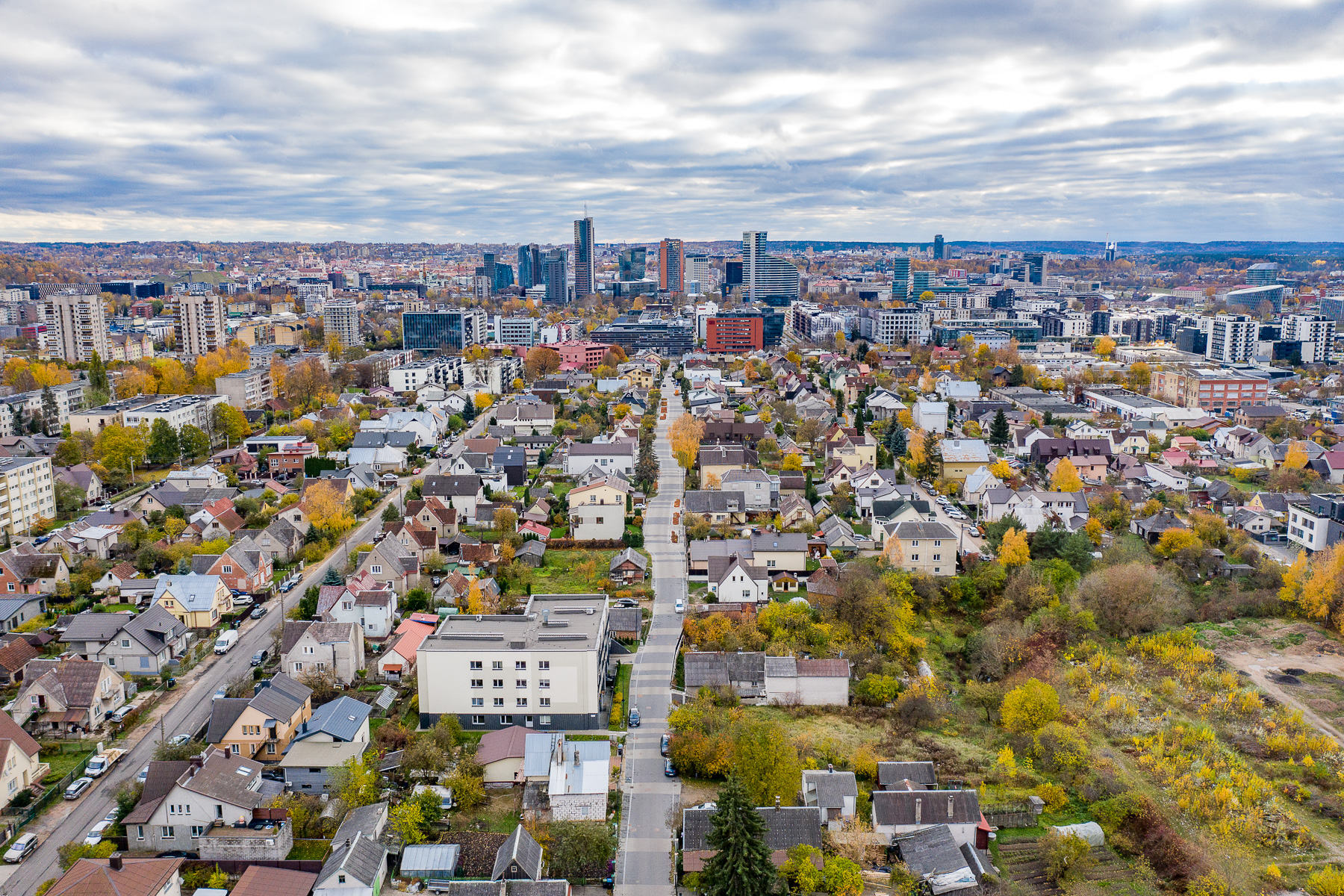
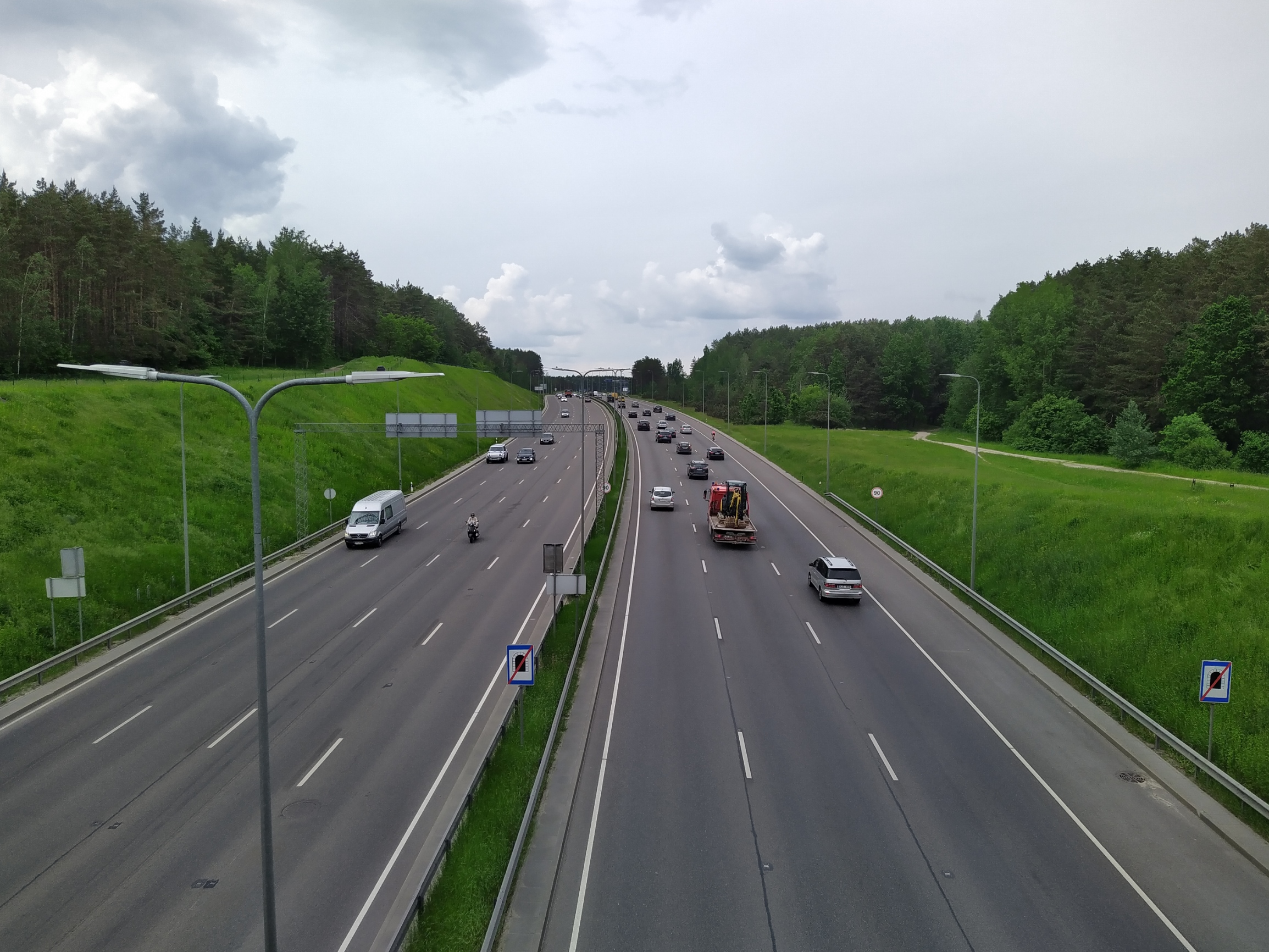
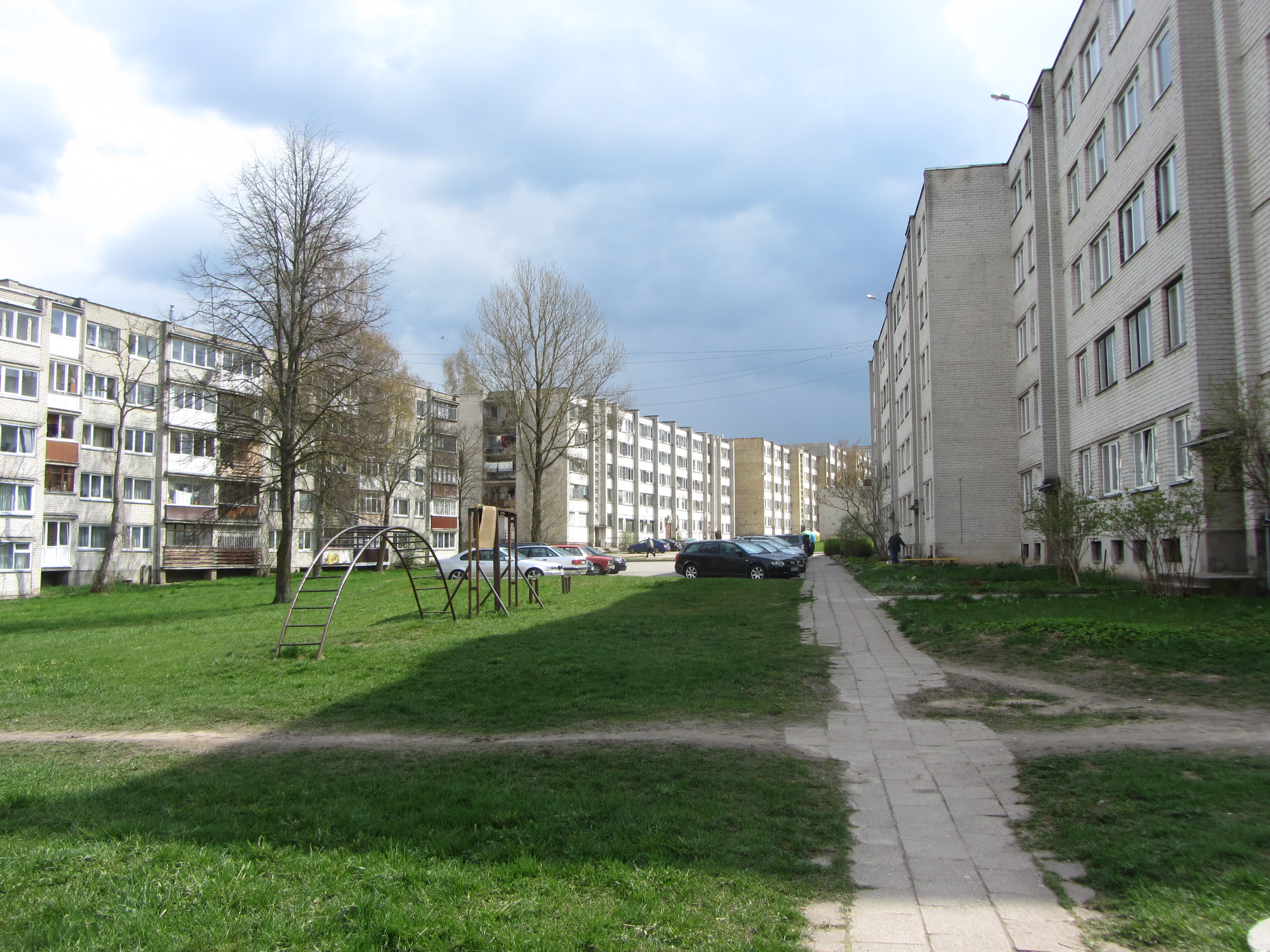
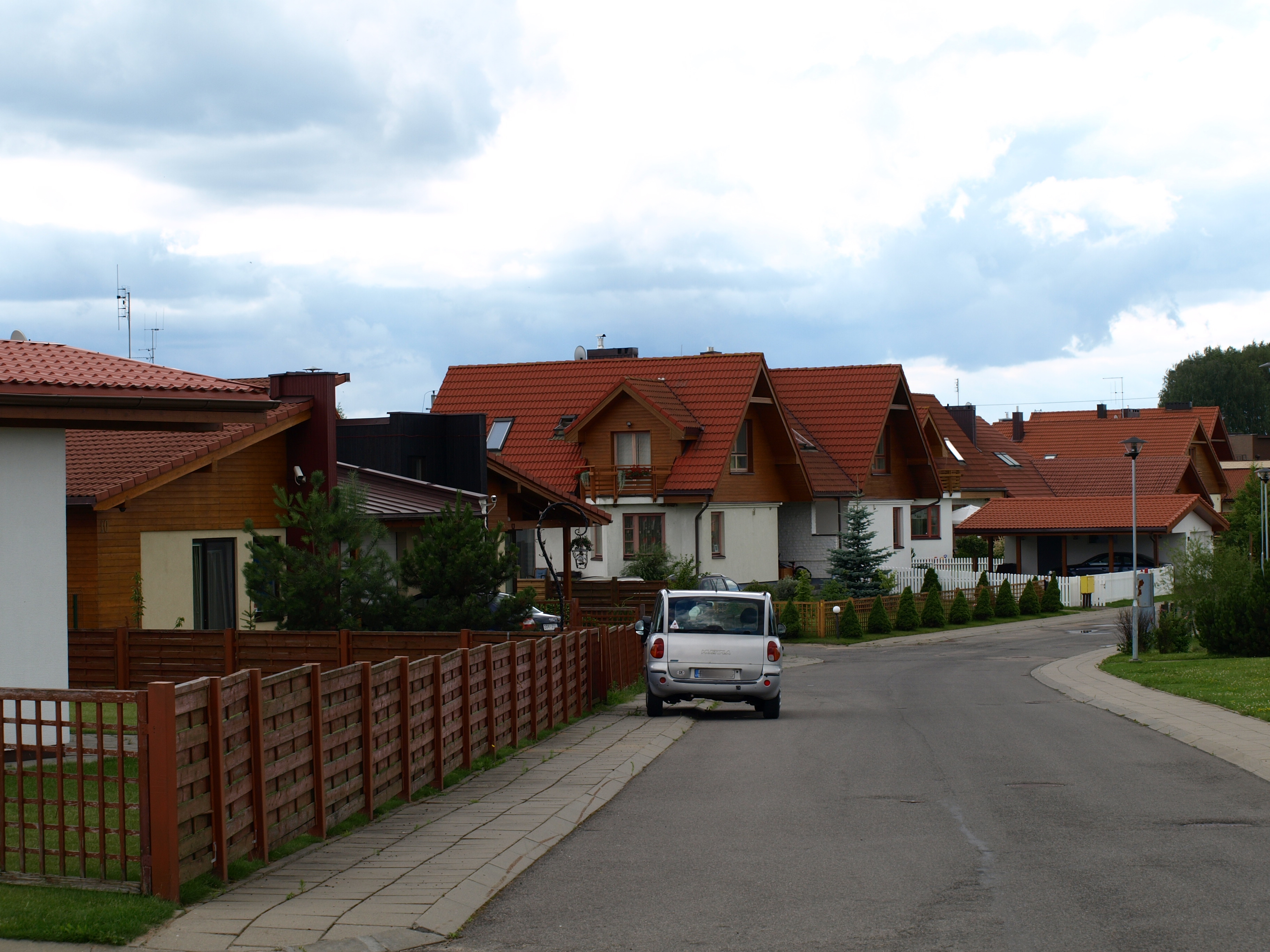
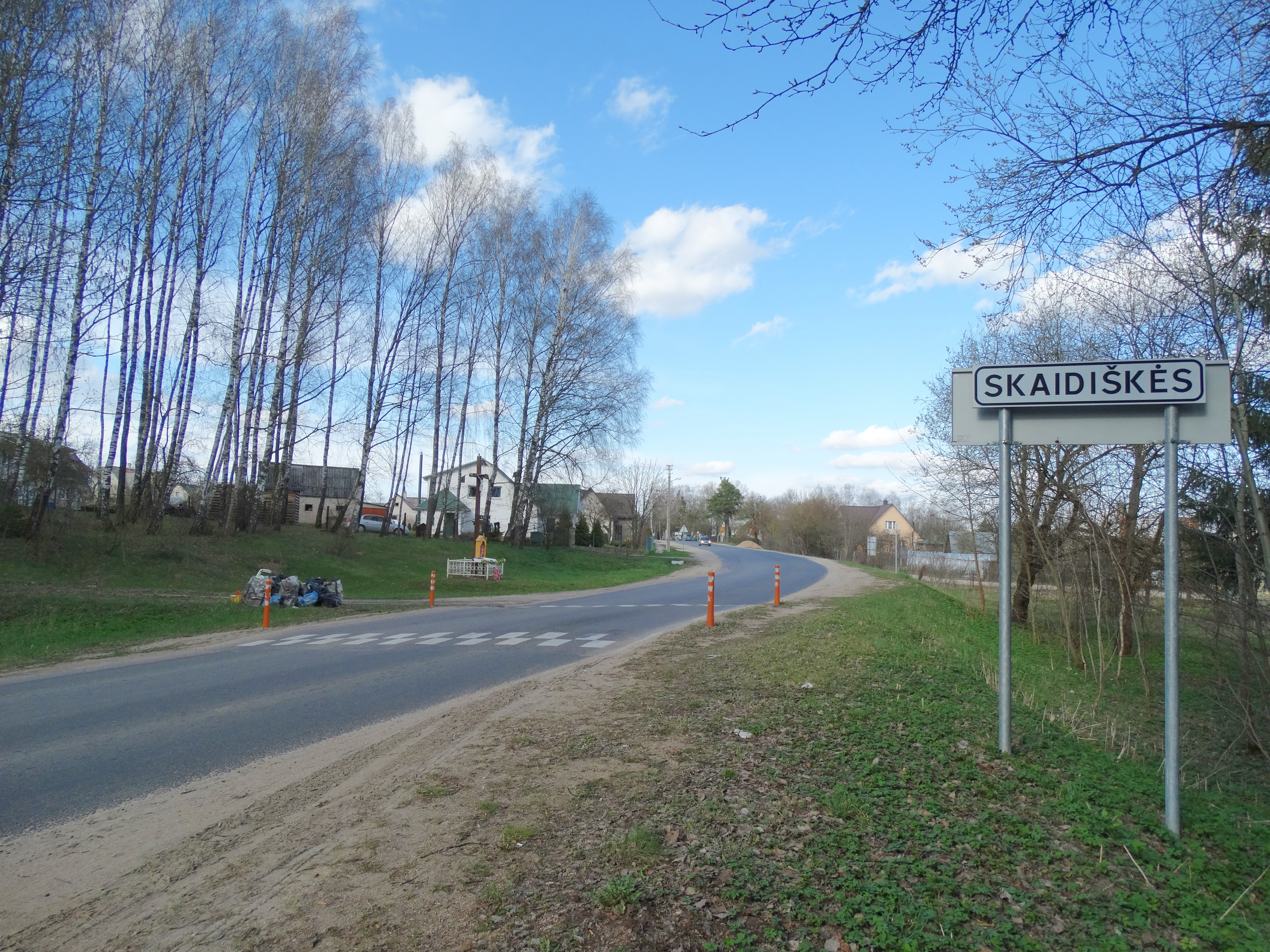
- From top, left to right: Šnipiškės; Vilnius western bypass; Lentvaris; Bendoriai; Skaidiškės

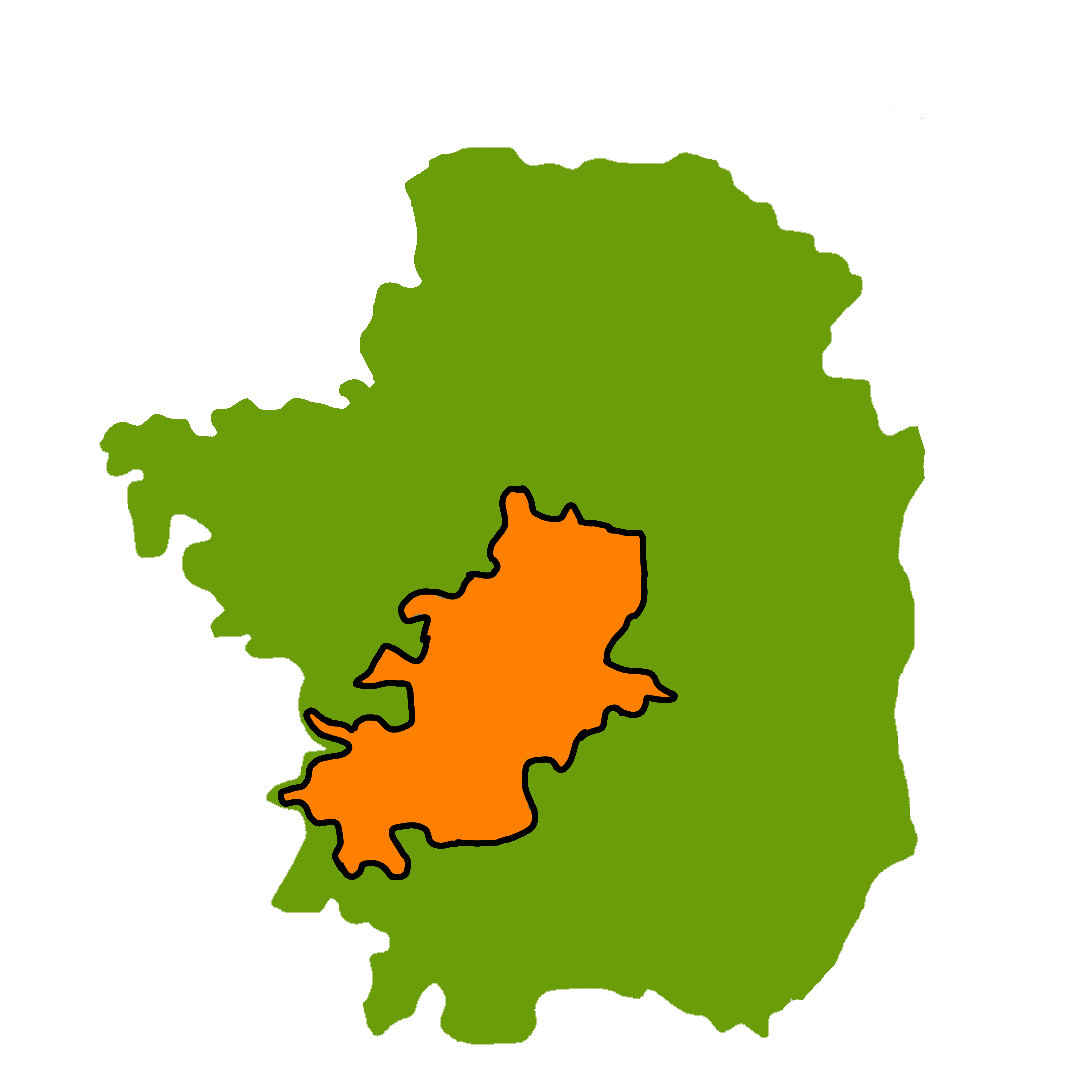
- Vilnius City (orange) and District (green) Municipalities
- Country: Lithuania
- Largest city: Vilnius

Area
  - Urban: 538 km^{2} (208 sq mi)
  - Metro: 9,730 km^{2} (3,760 sq mi)

Population (2023)
  - Urban: Nat: 649,328; EU: 767,907
  - Urban density: 1,207/km^{2} (3,130/sq mi)
  - Metro: 881,499

GDP (2024)
  - Metro: €36.2 billion (nominal); US$69 billion (2024, PPP)
  - Per capita: €41,500 (nominal); US$78,829 (2024, PPP)
- Time zone: UTC+2 (EET)

The Vilnius urban area (known in Lithuanian as: Vilniaus aglomeracija and legally as the Vilniaus miesto tvarios plėtros strategijos įgyvendinimo teritorija) is the functional urban area of Vilnius. The continuous built-up area is spread across three municipalities in Vilnius County, spanning for 538 km^{2}.

== Area ==
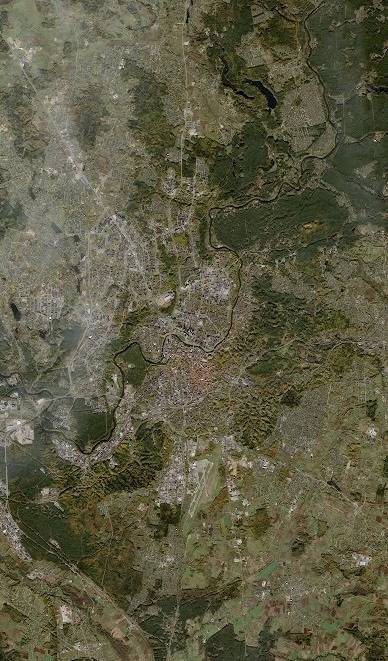
Vilnius urban sprawl from space, ESA

The continuous built-up area of Vilnius streches to 538 km^{2}. The area includes the 401 km^{2} Vilnius City Municipality, including cities of Vilnius and Grigiškės, and the surrounding suburbia: 121km^{2} of the Vilnius District Municipality, that had a population of 44,347 in July 2023, and 16 km^{2} of the Trakai District Municipality, including city of Lentvaris, with population of 11,545 people respectively.

== Demographics ==
The largest cities, towns or villages within the urban area are Vilnius, Lentvaris, Grigiškės, Skaidiškės.

Subdivision	Urban area (km^{2})	Urban population
Vilnius	401	593,436
Vilnius District Municipality	121	44,347
Trakai District Municipality	16	11,545
Vilnius urban area	538	649,328

== Definition ==
While Vilnius urban area occupies only most of Vilnius City and Vilnius District municipalities and a small part of Trakai District, Vilnius metropolitan region is a larger entity, occupying, depending on definition, most or all of Vilnius county, at some cases, stretching also well into Alytus and Utena counties.

== Dual-City (Dipolis) ==
Dual city of Vilnius and Kaunas (known in Lithuanian as: Vilniaus ir Kauno dvimiestis or dipolis) is an idea to combine resources of Vilnius and Kaunas to be able to compete with larger European cities like Warsaw, Budapest, Bucharest or Prague for Western investments. The plan, which includes various forms of collaboration and vocalizes the idea, among all the other projects,– of fast commuting between the two (most notably – the construction of high speed rail) is not fully realized but idea is slowly being implemented (see: Rail Baltica) and is brought up by politicians every year. Combined metropolitan area of both cities would have population of more than 1.5 million and would produce more than a half of Lithuania's total GDP.

== Economy ==
In 2024 Vilnius gross metropolitan product was around US$40 billion.

== Gallery ==
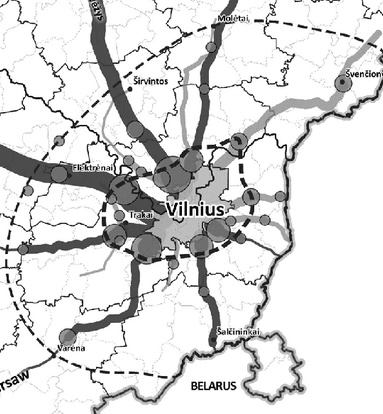
Limits of Vilnius city functional region according to intensity of traffic of daily commuters (the data of Lithuanian Road Administration under the Ministry of Transport and Communications)

Urban sprawl in Vilnius city and Vilnius district

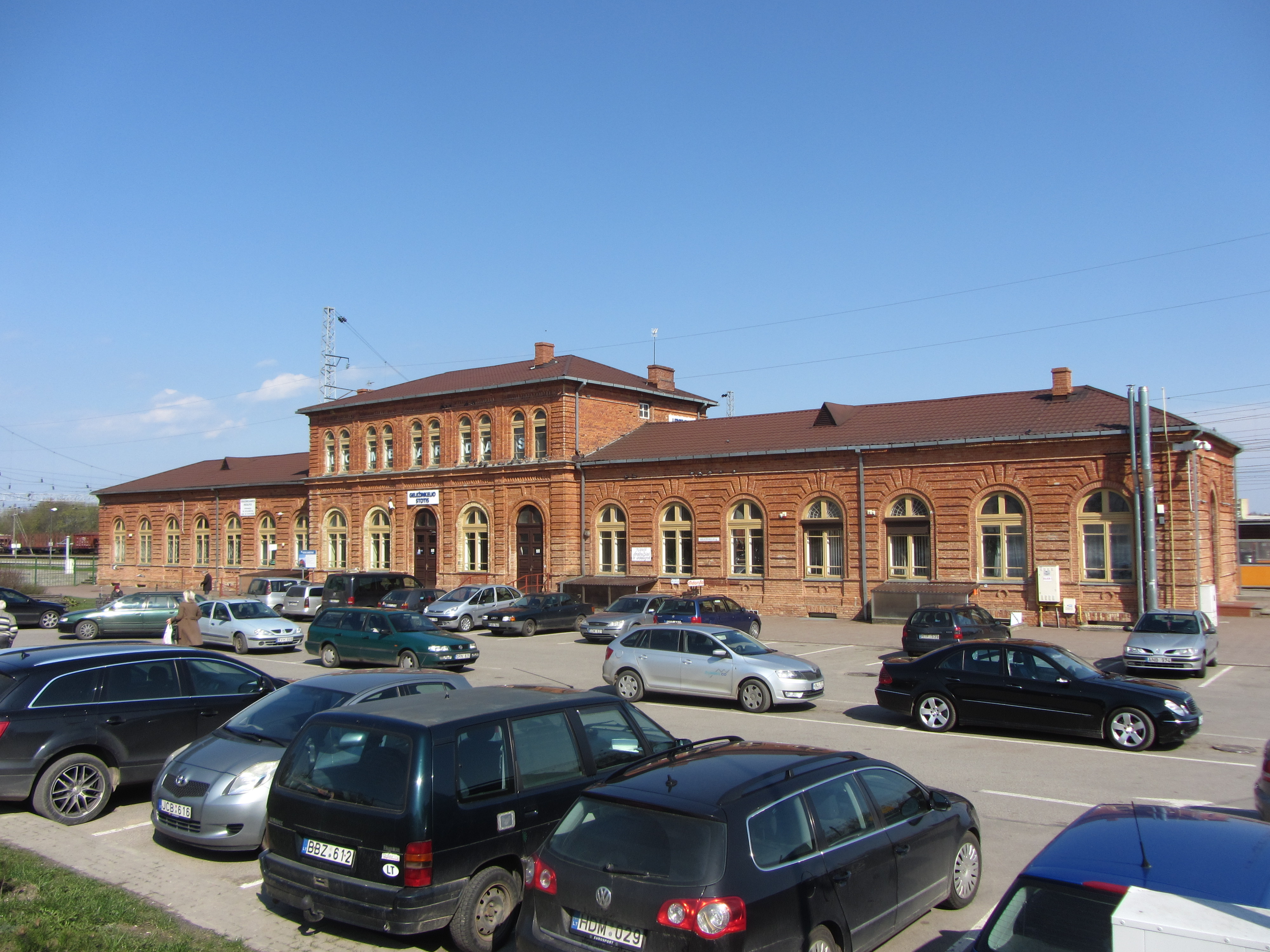
Lentvaris railway station. Commuting from the town to Vilnius is widespread via rail, road, and bus transport

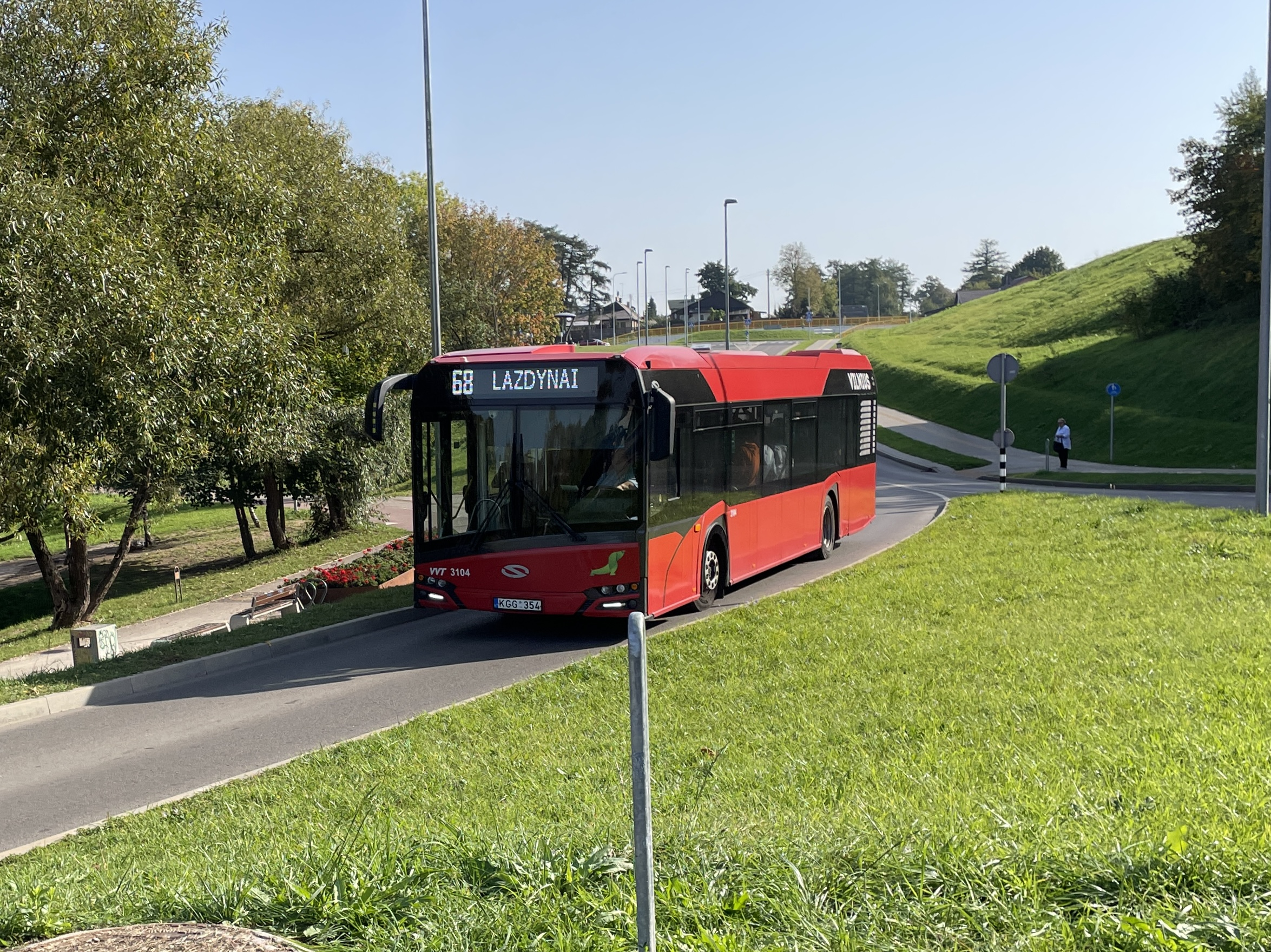
Vilnius city municipal bus in Lentvaris

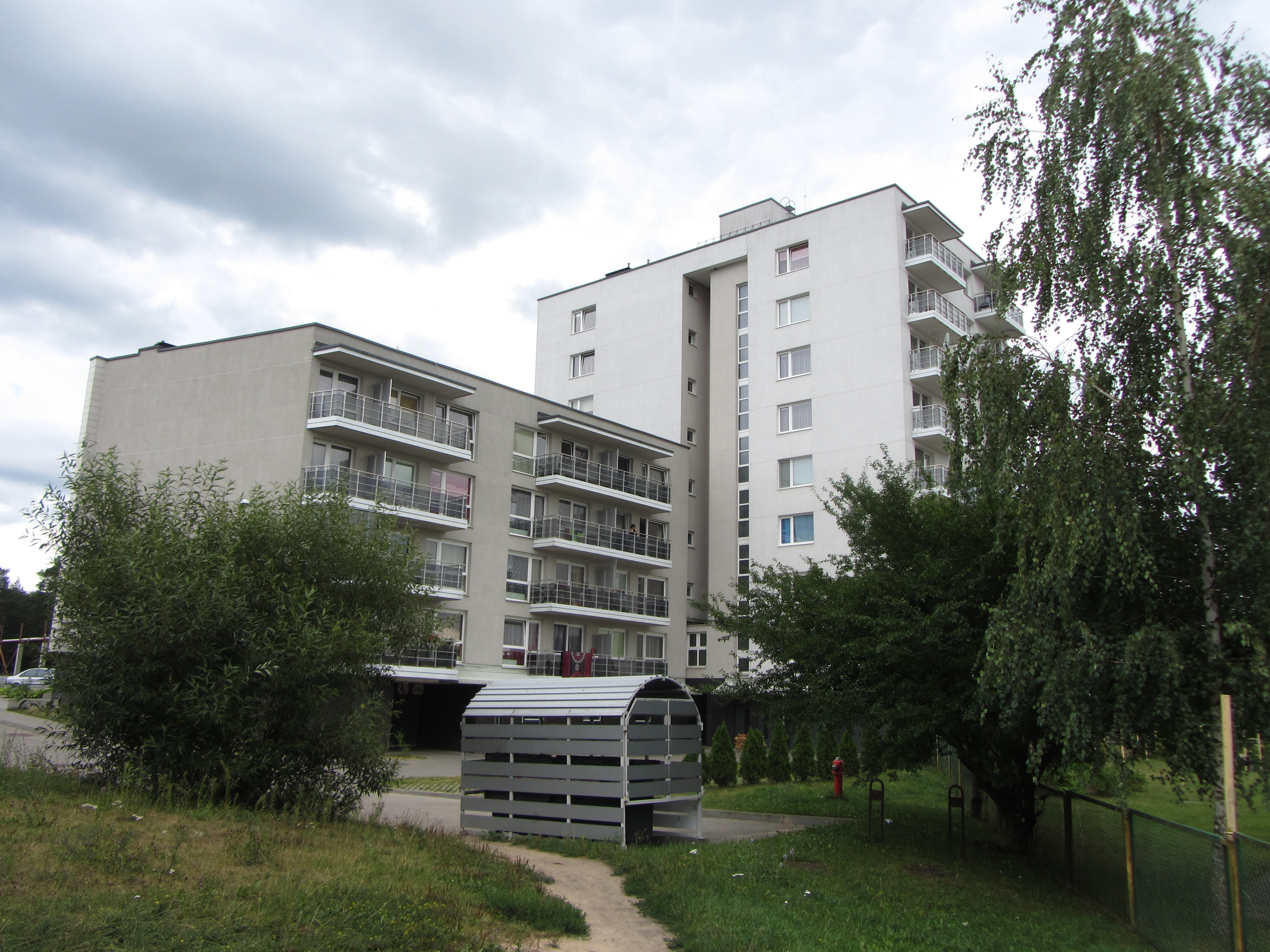
New multi-storey housing is being built outside Vilnius like this residential house in Grigiškės

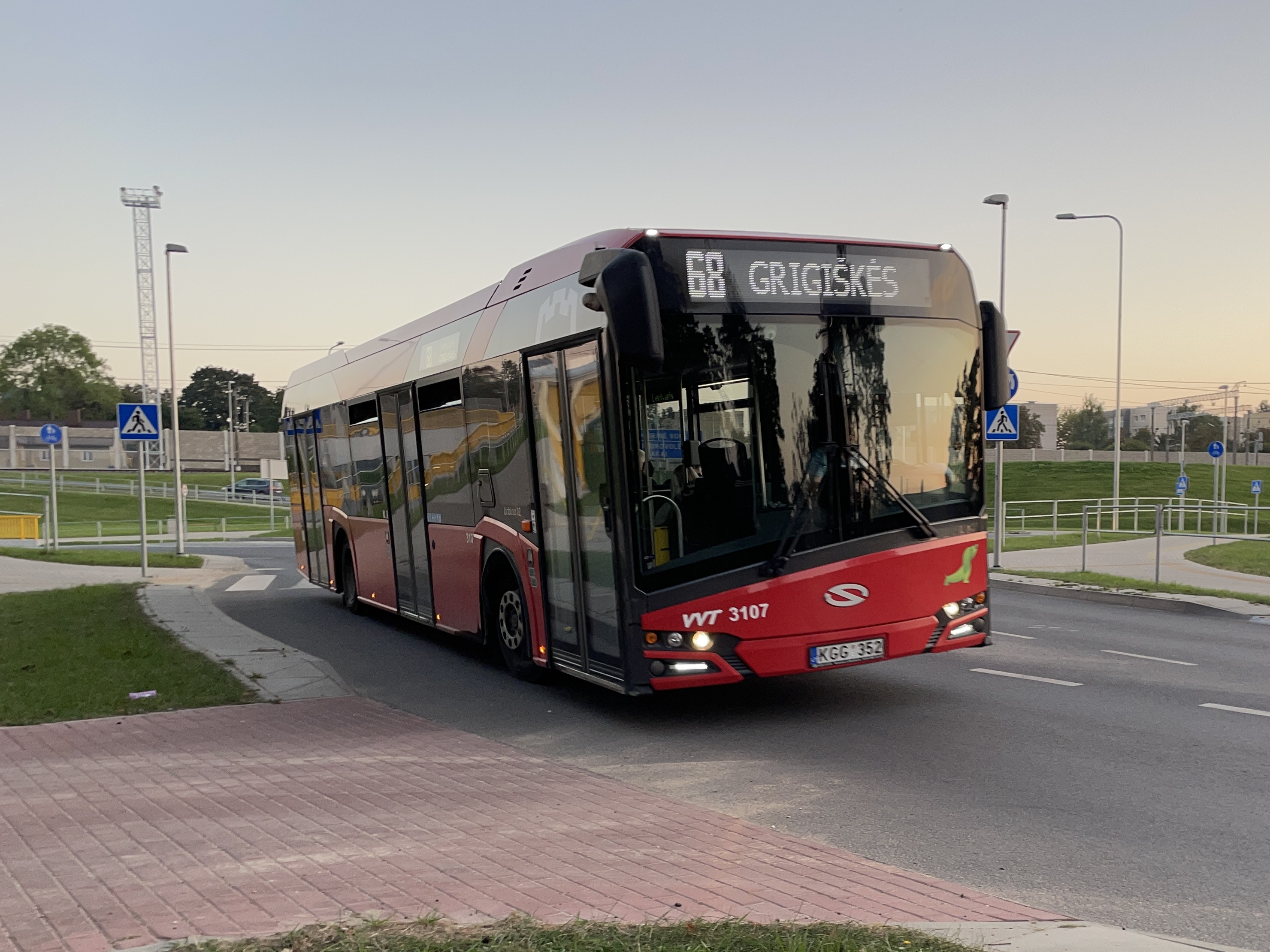
Some Vilnius city bus routes run through Grigiškės, Lentvaris, Klevinė, Bendoriai, Didžioji Riešė and other suburbs in Vilnius district and Trakai district municipalities

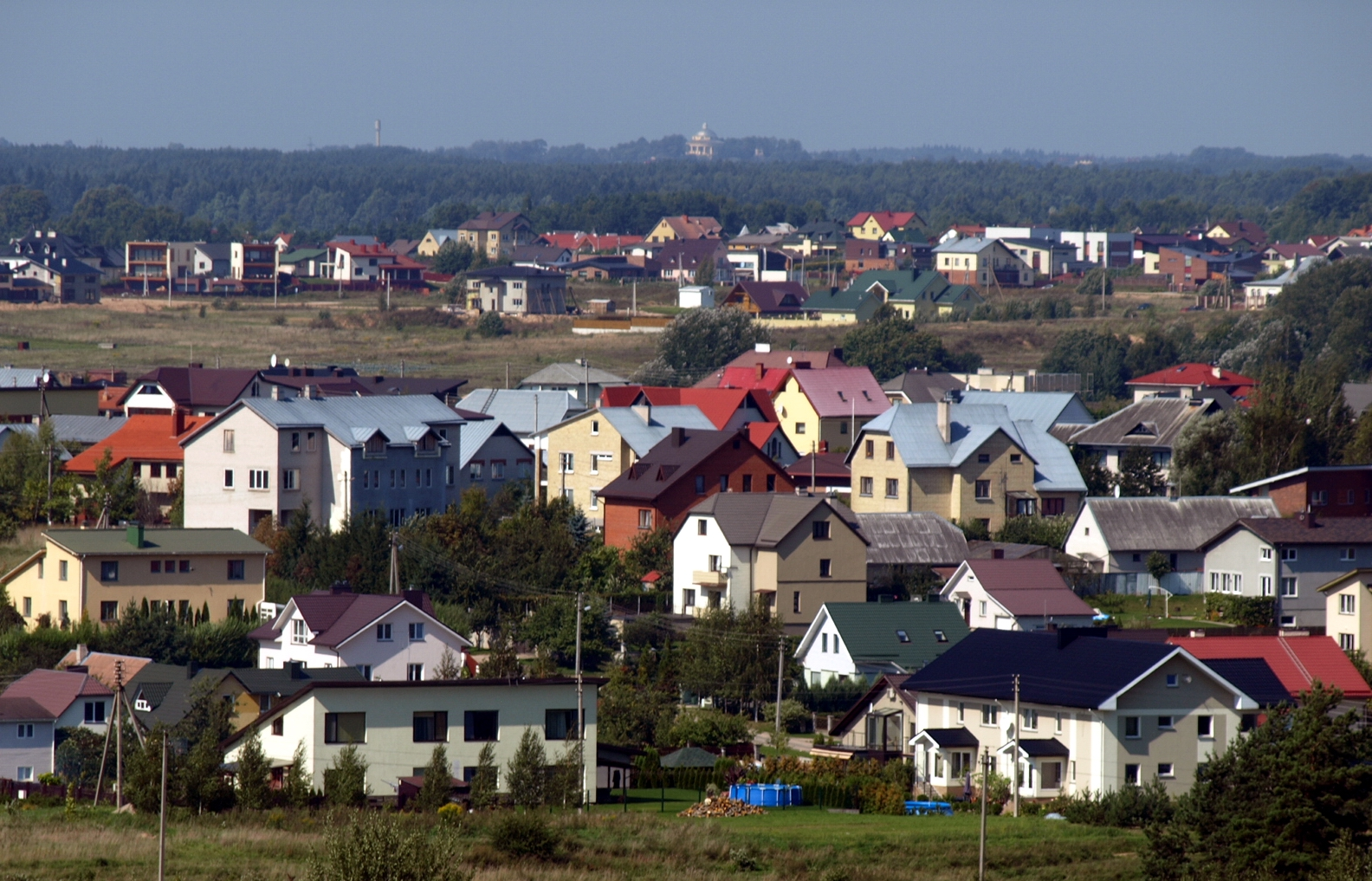
Zujūnai, one of suburbs of Vilnius

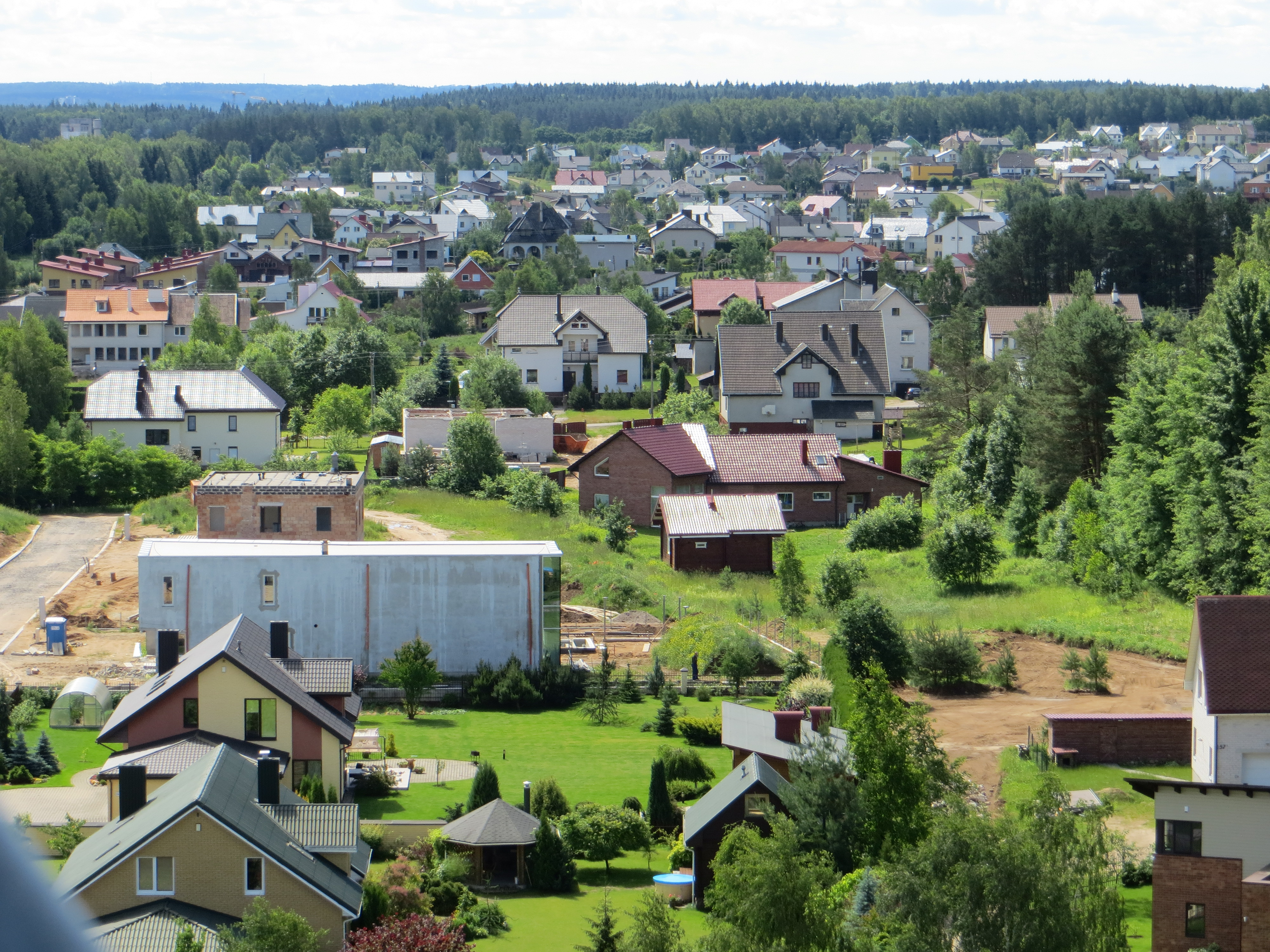
Suburban housing in Didžioji Riešė, an example of urban sprawl

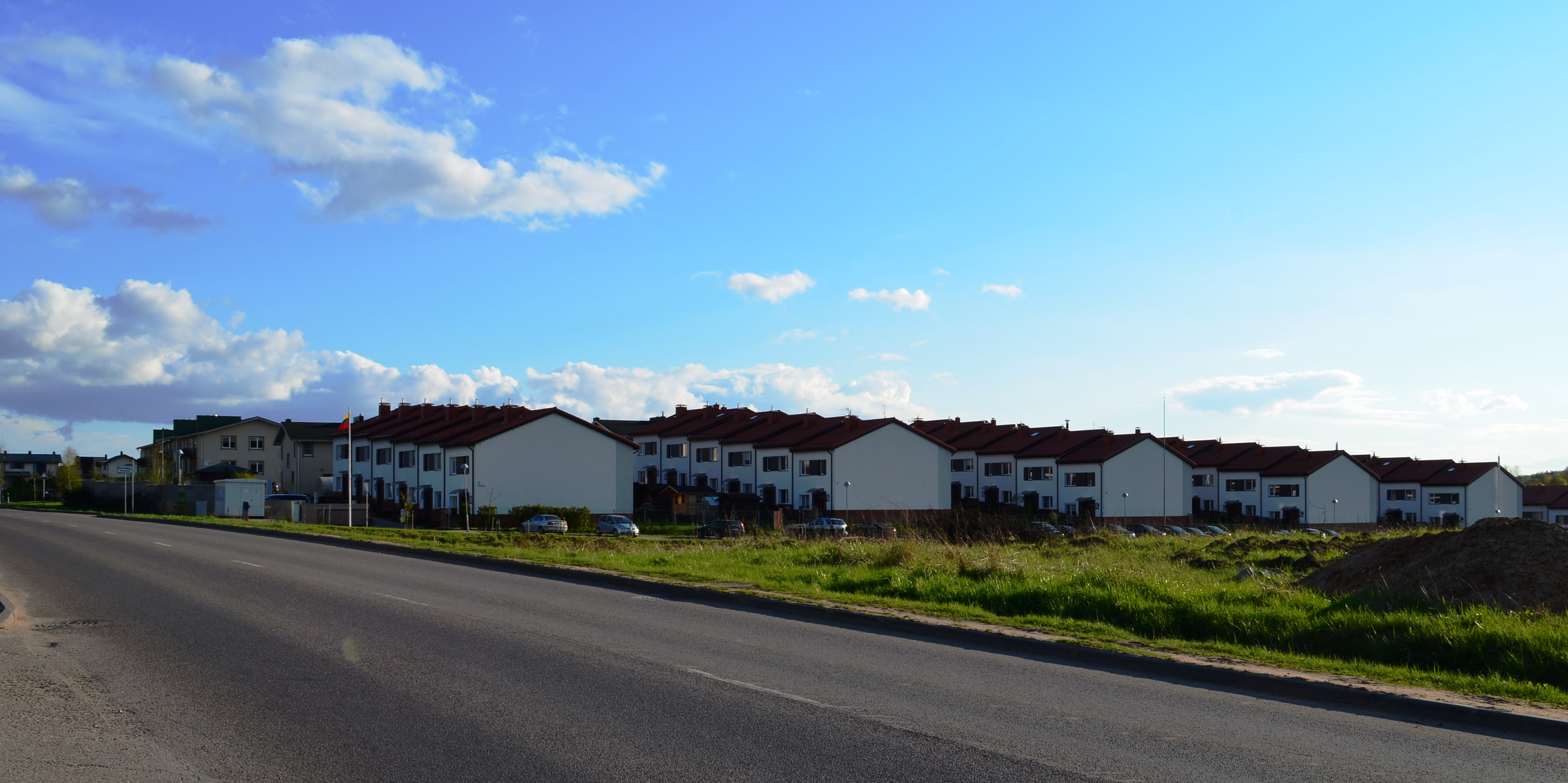
Rows of suburban housing outside Vilnius in Vilnius district municipality

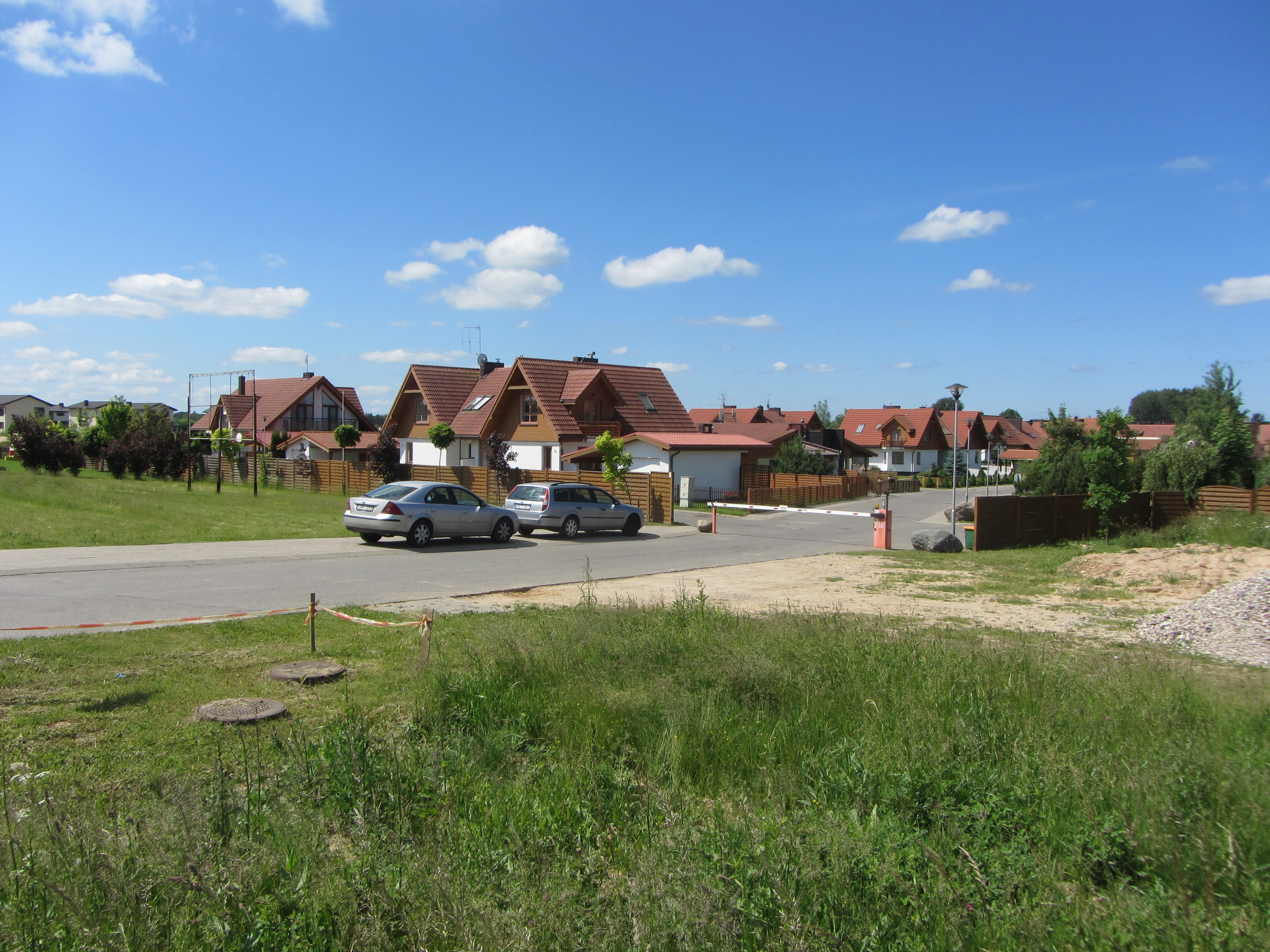
New housing some 6-7 km. to the north of the city border of Vilnius

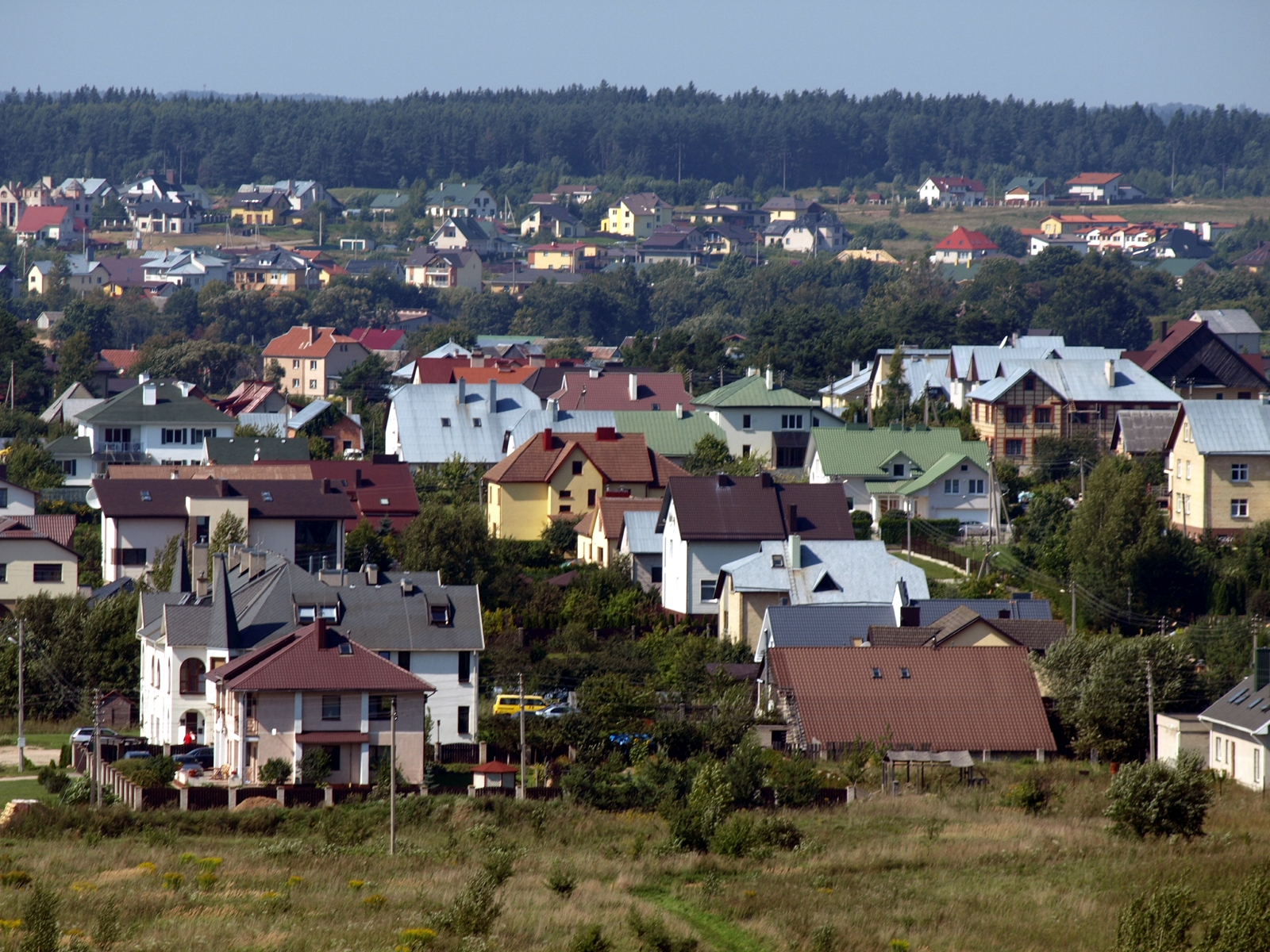
Residential houses, built after 1992 in Gineitiškės village as seen from Pašilaičiai apartment buildingss

== See also ==
- List of EU metropolitan areas by GDP
- List of metropolitan areas in Europe
- Kaunas urban area
