= Kaunas urban area =

Kaunas urban area Kauno aglomeracija
- Urban area
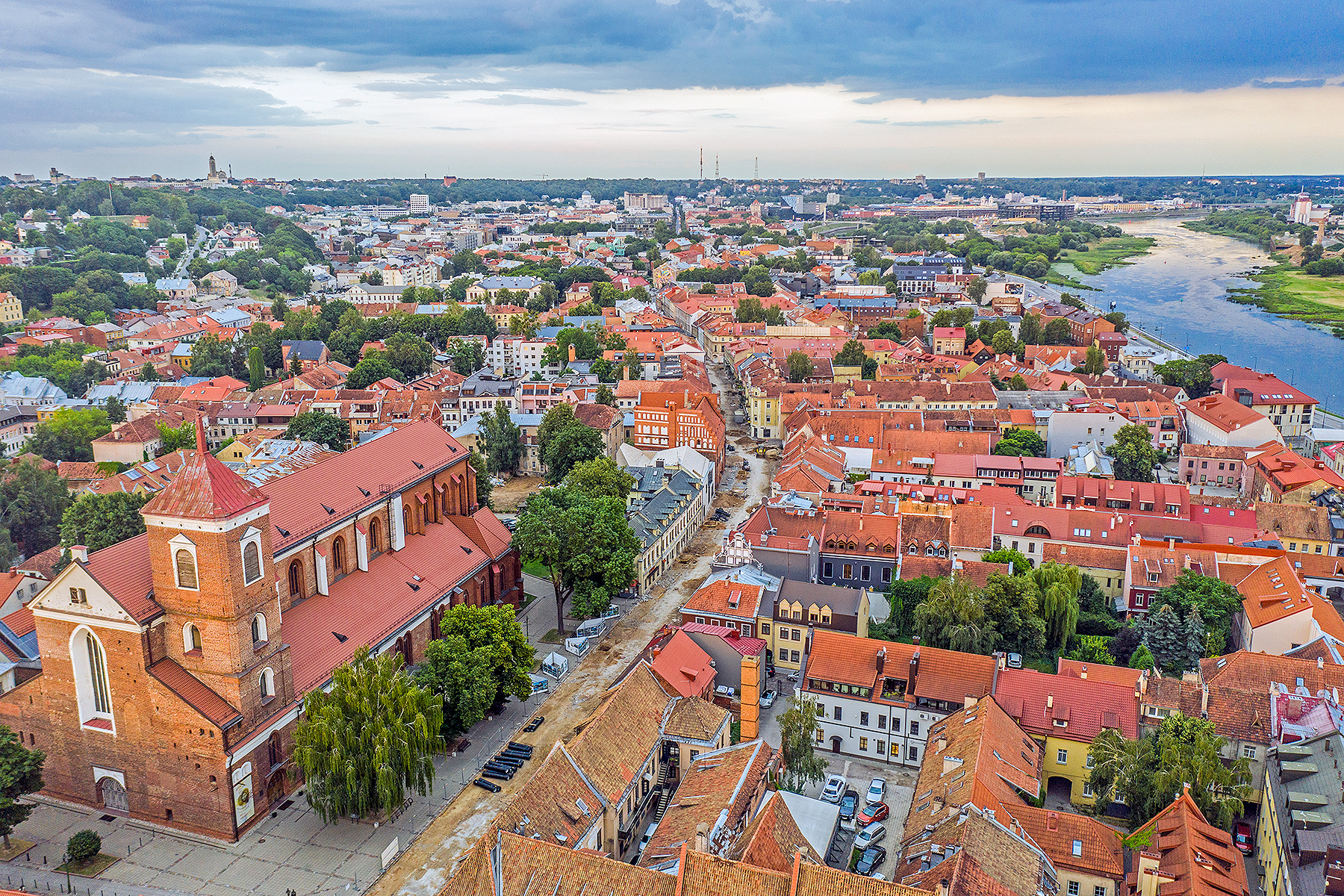
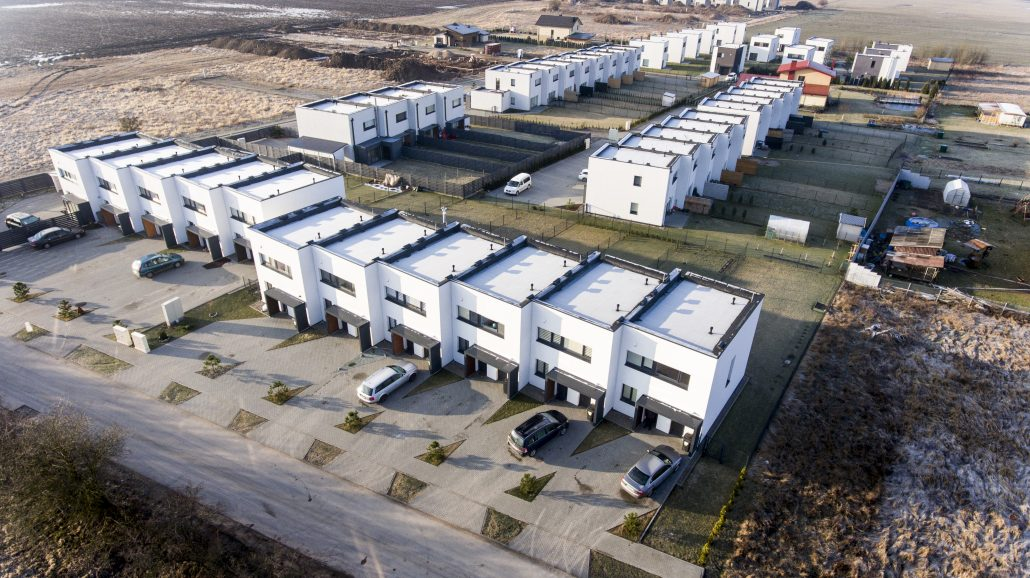
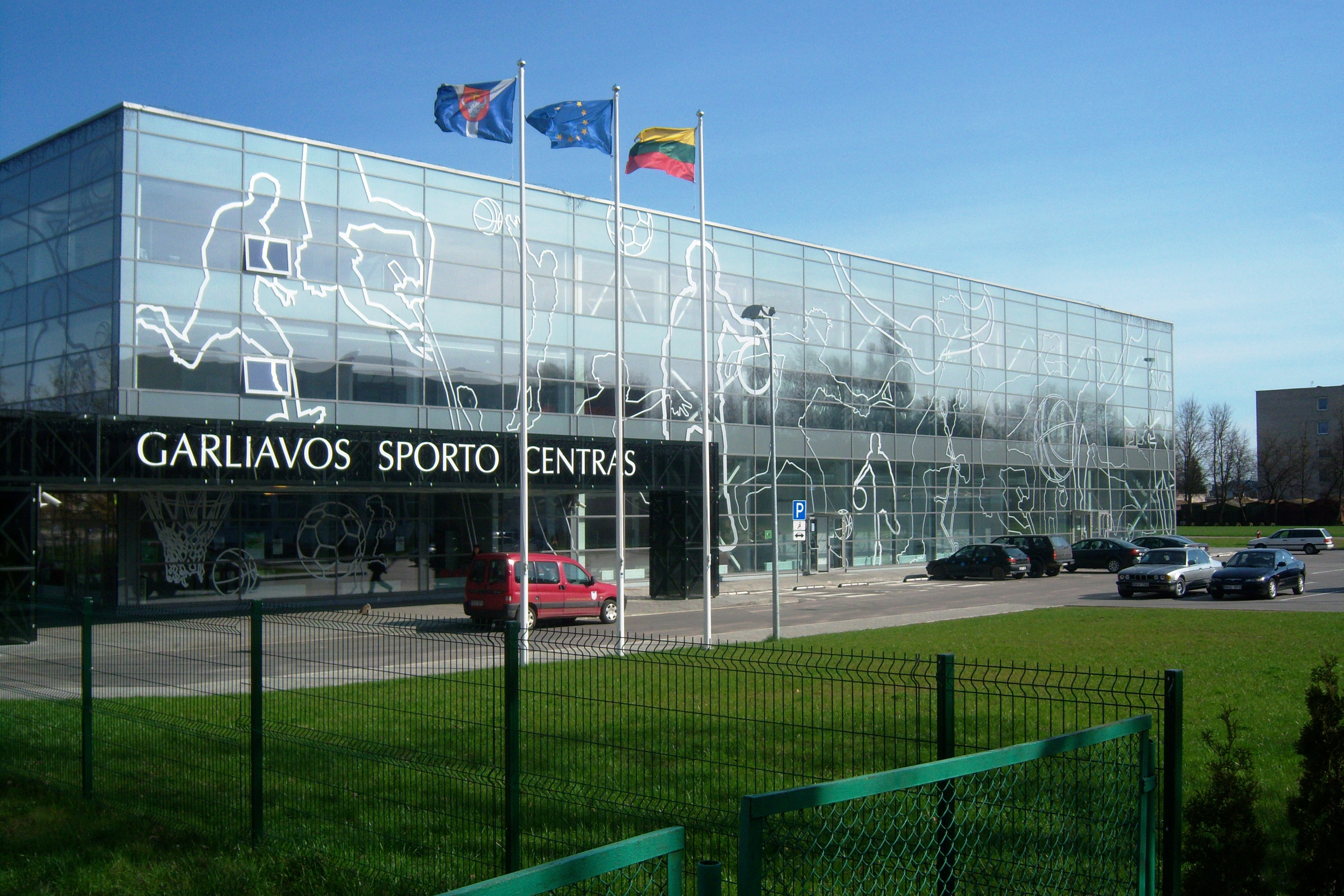
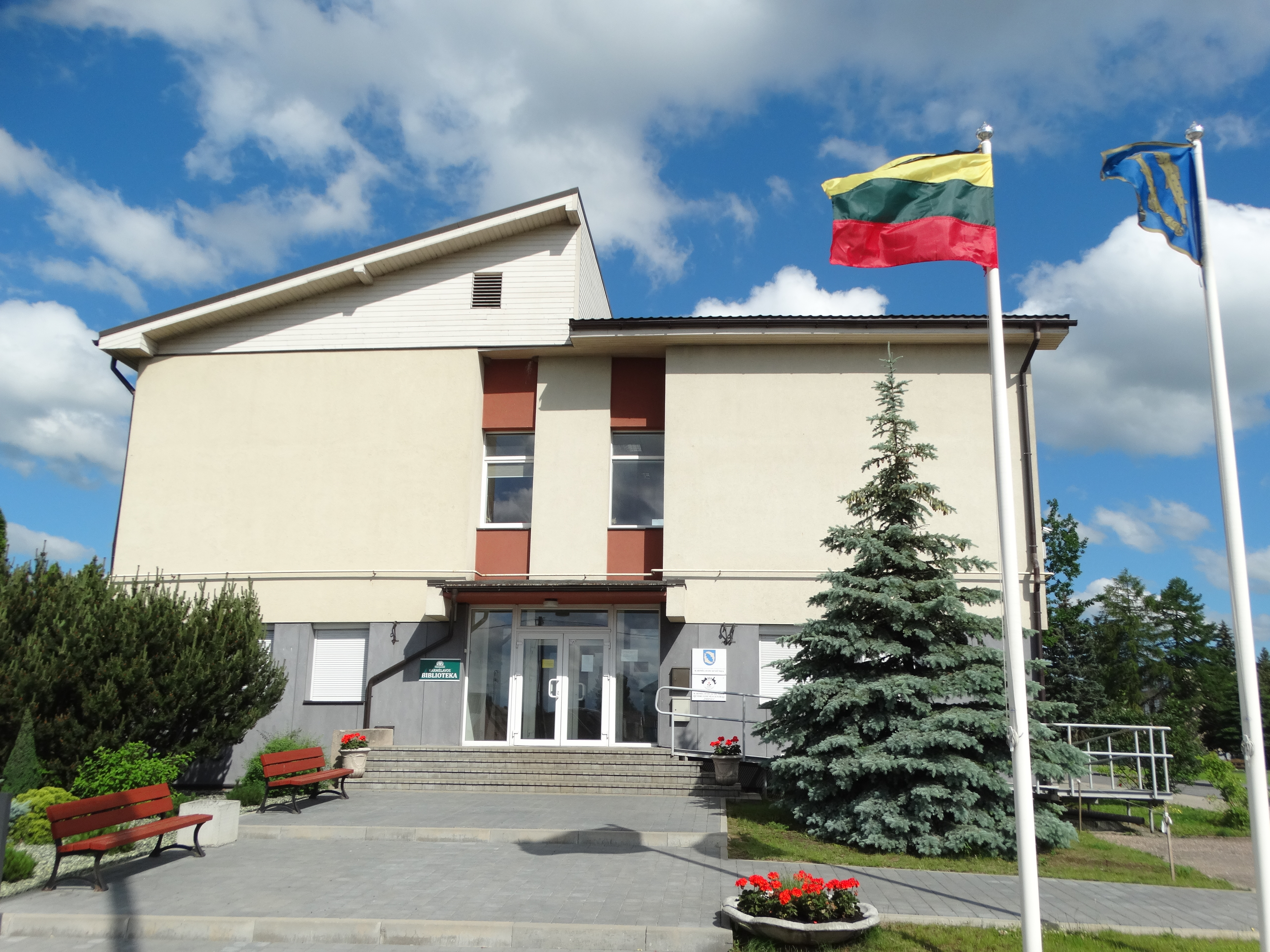
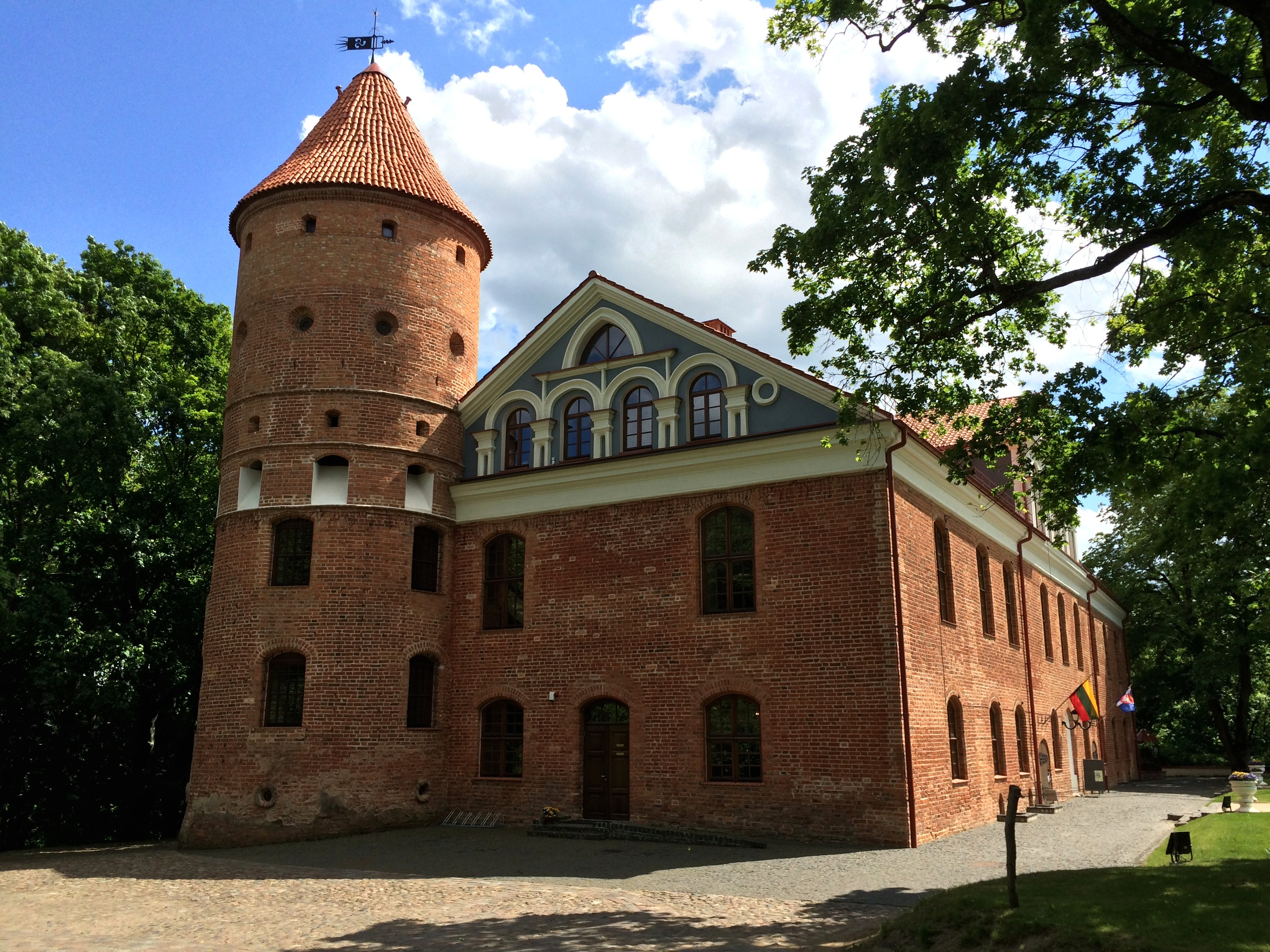
- From top, left to right: Kaunas Old Town; One of the new house complexes in Domeikava; Sports centre in Garliava; Karmėlava Eldership building; Raudondvaris Castle

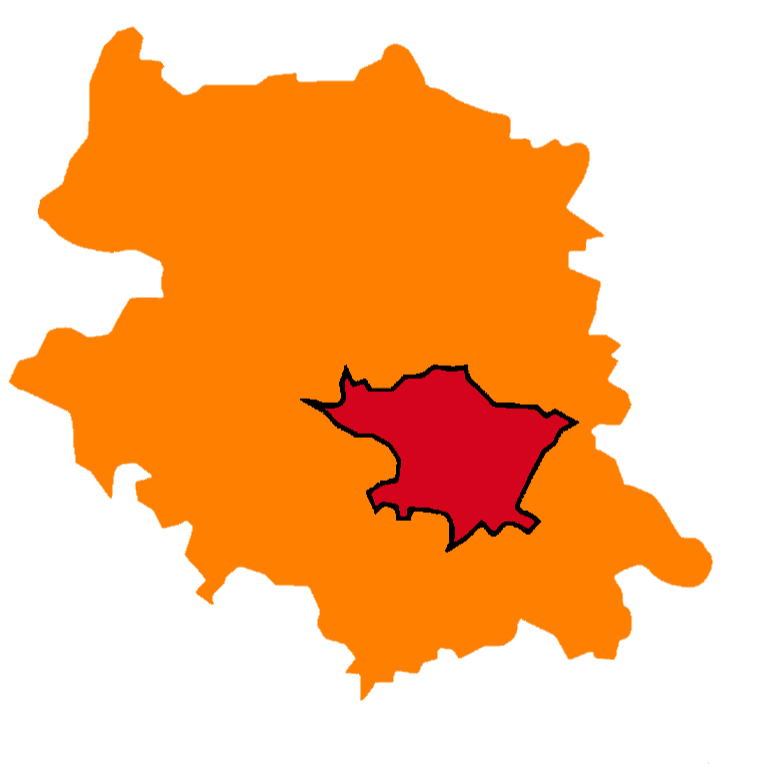
- Kaunas City (red) and District (orange) Municipalities
- Country: Lithuania
- Largest city: Kaunas

Area
  - Urban: 302 km^{2} (117 sq mi)

Population
  - Urban: 365,081
  - Urban density: 1,210/km^{2} (3,130/sq mi)

GDP
  - Metro: €15.860 billion (2024)
  - Per capita: €27,000 (2024)
- Time zone: UTC+2 (EET)

The Kaunas urban area (known in Lithuanian as Kauno aglomeracija) is the functional urban area of Kaunas. The area covers two municipalities in the Kaunas County, with a total built-up area of around 302 km^{2}.

== Area ==
The continuous built-up area of Kaunas streches to 302 km^{2}. The area includes the 158 km^{2} Kaunas City Municipality and the surrounding suburbia: 144 km^{2} of the Kaunas District Municipality, that had a population of 60,884 in 2024.

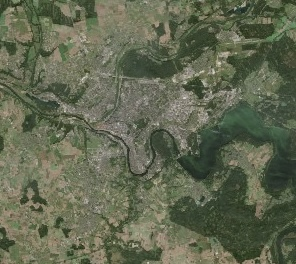
Kaunas urban sprawl from space, ESA

== Demographics ==
The largest cities or towns within the area are Kaunas, Garliava, Domeikava and Raudondvaris.

Subdivision	Urban area (km^{2})	Urban population
Kaunas	158	304,198
Kaunas District Municipality	144	60,883
Kaunas urban area	302	365,081

== Dual city ==
The dual city of Vilnius and Kaunas (known in Lithuanian as Vilniaus ir Kauno dvimiestis) is an idea to combine the resources of Vilnius and Kaunas in order to compete with larger European cities like Warsaw, Budapest, Bucharest and Prague for Western investments. The plan includes various forms of collaboration and vocalizes the idea (among other projects) of fast commuting between the two (most notably the construction of high speed rail). The plan has not been fully realized, but the idea is slowly being implemented (see: Rail Baltica) and is brought up by politicians every year. The combined metropolitan area of both cities would have a population of more than 1.5 million and would produce more than a half of Lithuania's total GDP.

== Economy ==
In 2024, Kaunas' gross metropolitan product was almost US$20 billion.

== See also ==
- List of EU metropolitan areas by GDP
- Vilnius urban area
