= Zujūnai Eldership =

Zujūnai Eldership Zujūnų seniūnija
- Eldership
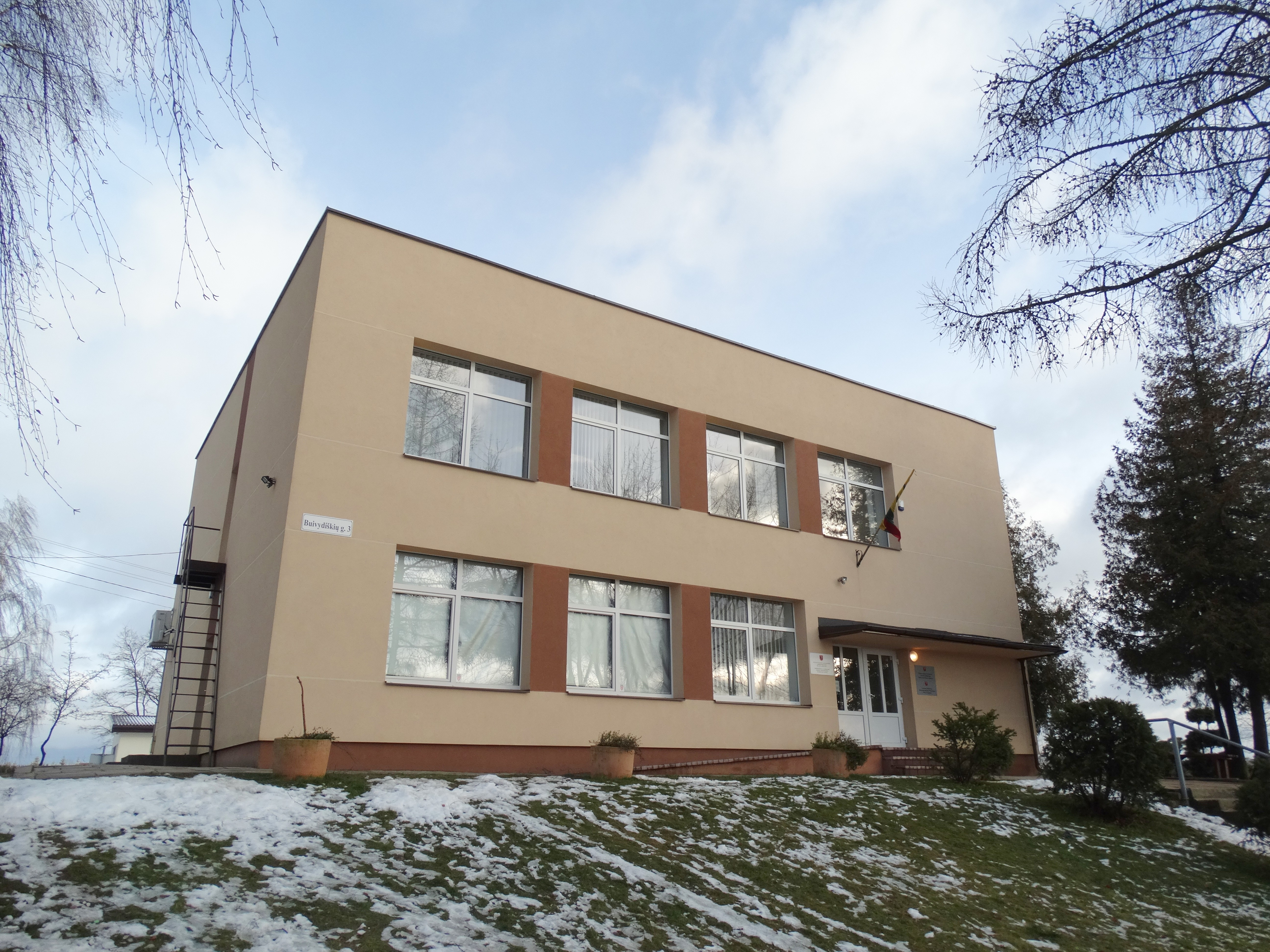
- Administration building

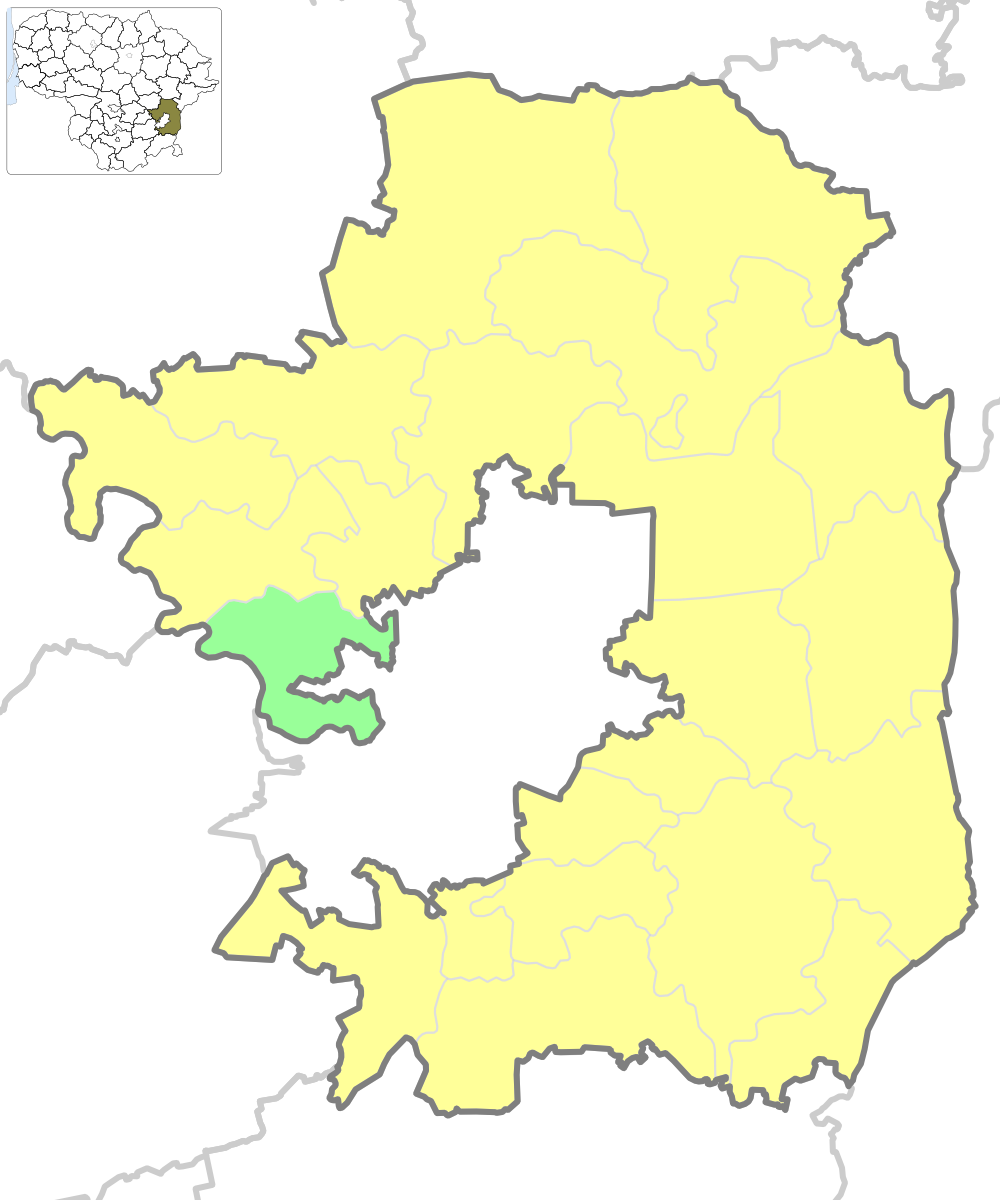
- Location of Zujūnai Eldership
- Country: Lithuania
- Ethnographic region: Dzūkija
- County: Vilnius County
- Municipality: Vilnius District Municipality
- Administrative centre: Zujūnai

Area
  - Total: 51 km^{2} (20 sq mi)

Population
  - Total: 7,311
  - Density: 140/km^{2} (370/sq mi)
- Time zone: UTC+2 (EET)
  - Summer (DST): UTC+3 (EEST)
- Website: https://www.vrsa.lt

Zujūnai Eldership (Lithuanian: Zujūnų seniūnija) is an eldership in Lithuania, located in Vilnius District Municipality, west of Vilnius. It is third most populous eldership in the municipality.

== Ethnic composition ==
According to 2021 National Census data, Zujūnai eldership with 7311 inhabitants was among the largest and fastest growing. The ethnic composition is as follows:

- Lithuanians - 59% (4312 inhabitants)
- Poles - 29.2% (2133 inhabitants)
- Russians - 6.3% (464 inhabitants)

According to 2011 National Census data, the ethnic composition is as follows:

- Poles - 52%
- Lithuanians - 40%
- Russians - 6%
