= Zujūnai =

- Village
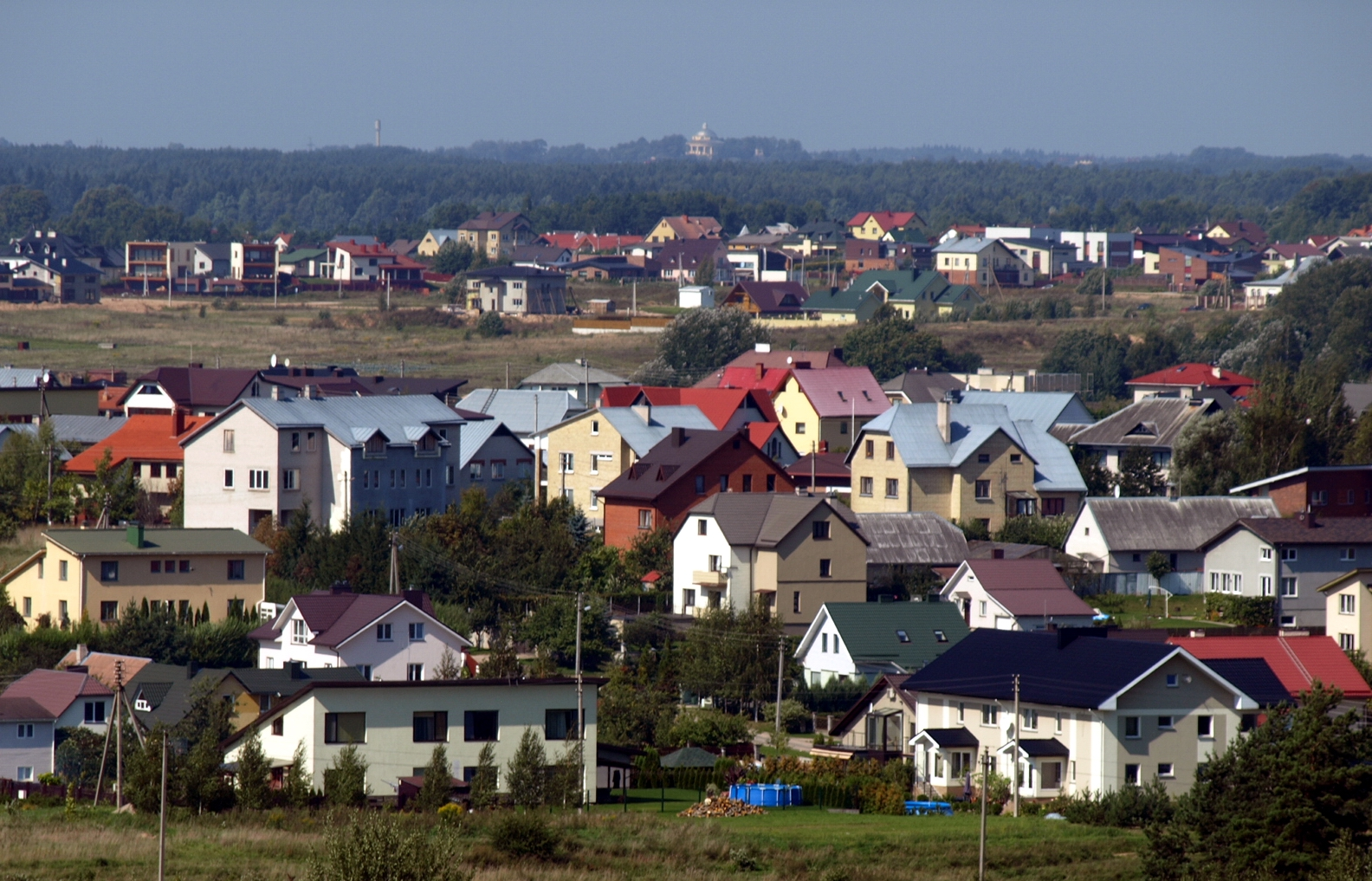
- Fragment of Zujūnai village as seen from Pašilaičiai tower blocks

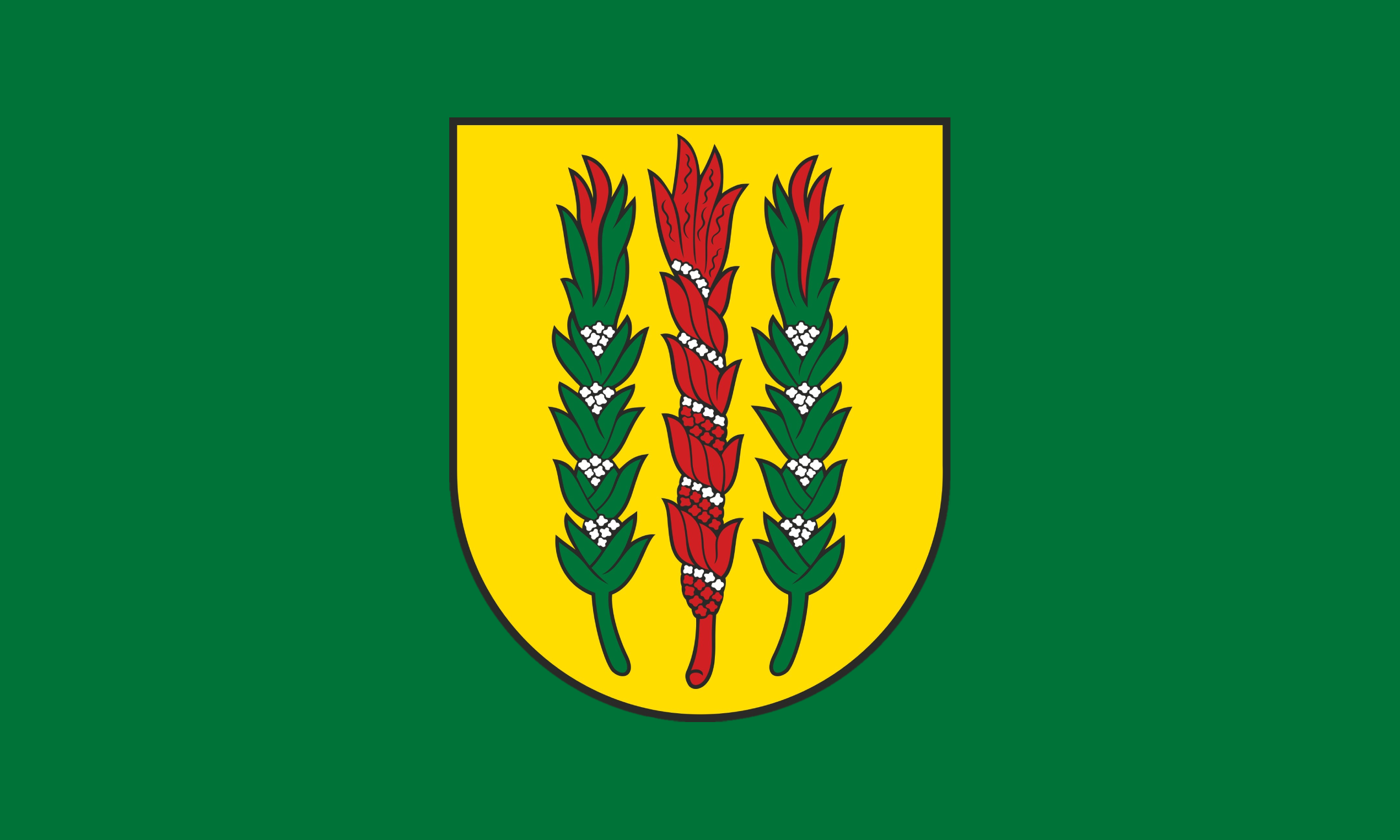
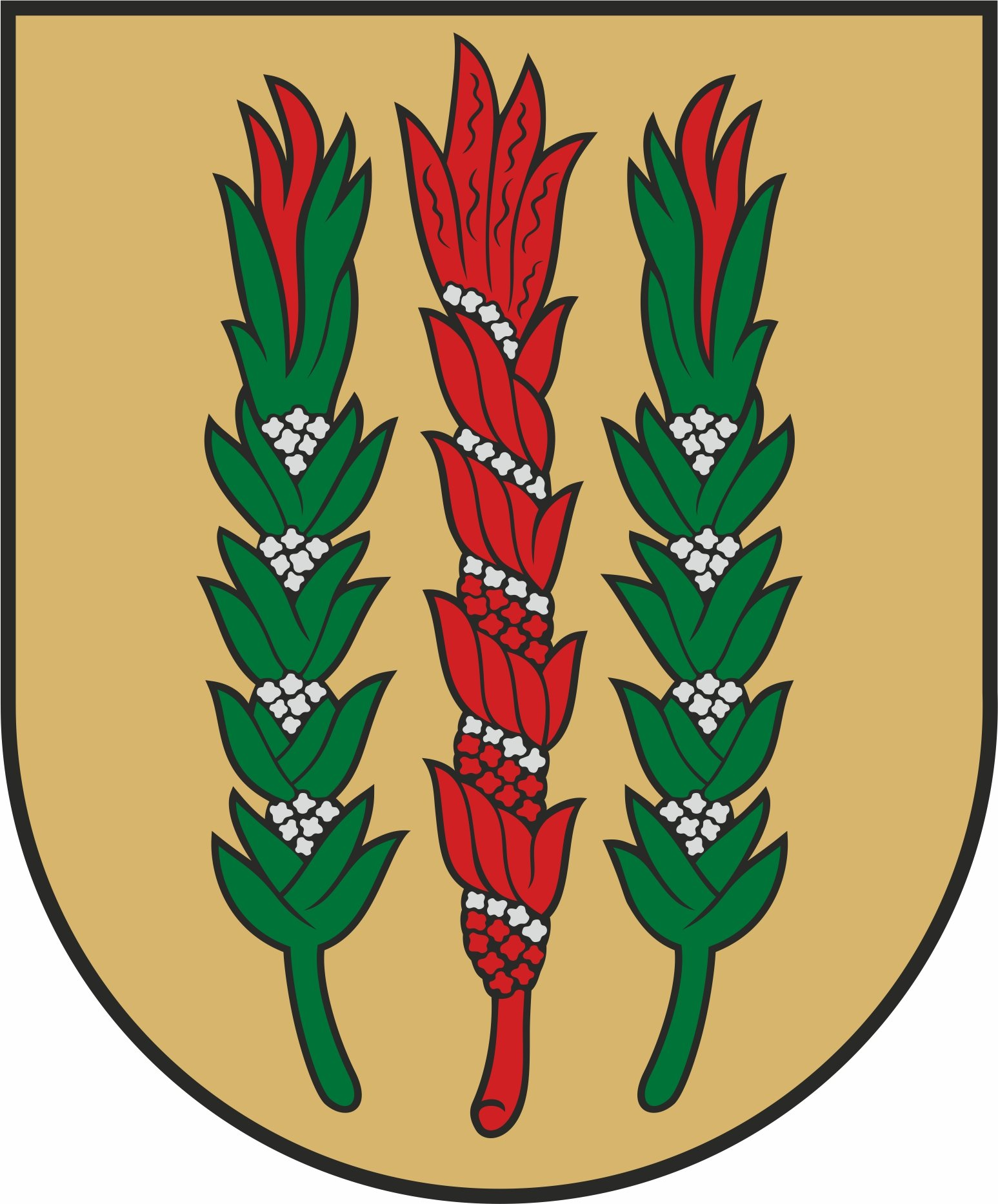
- Flag Coat of arms

- Location of Zujūnai
- Coordinates: 54°43′41″N 25°10′52″E
- Country: Lithuania
- County: Vilnius County
- Municipality: Vilnius district municipality
- Eldership: Zujūnai eldership
- Capital of: Zujūnai eldership

Population (2021)
  - Total: 1,539
- Time zone: UTC+2 (EET)
  - Summer (DST): UTC+3 (EEST)

Zujūnai is a village in Vilnius district municipality, Lithuania, it is located only about 1 kilometre (0.62 mi) east of Vilnius. According to the 2011 census, it had population of 1,660.

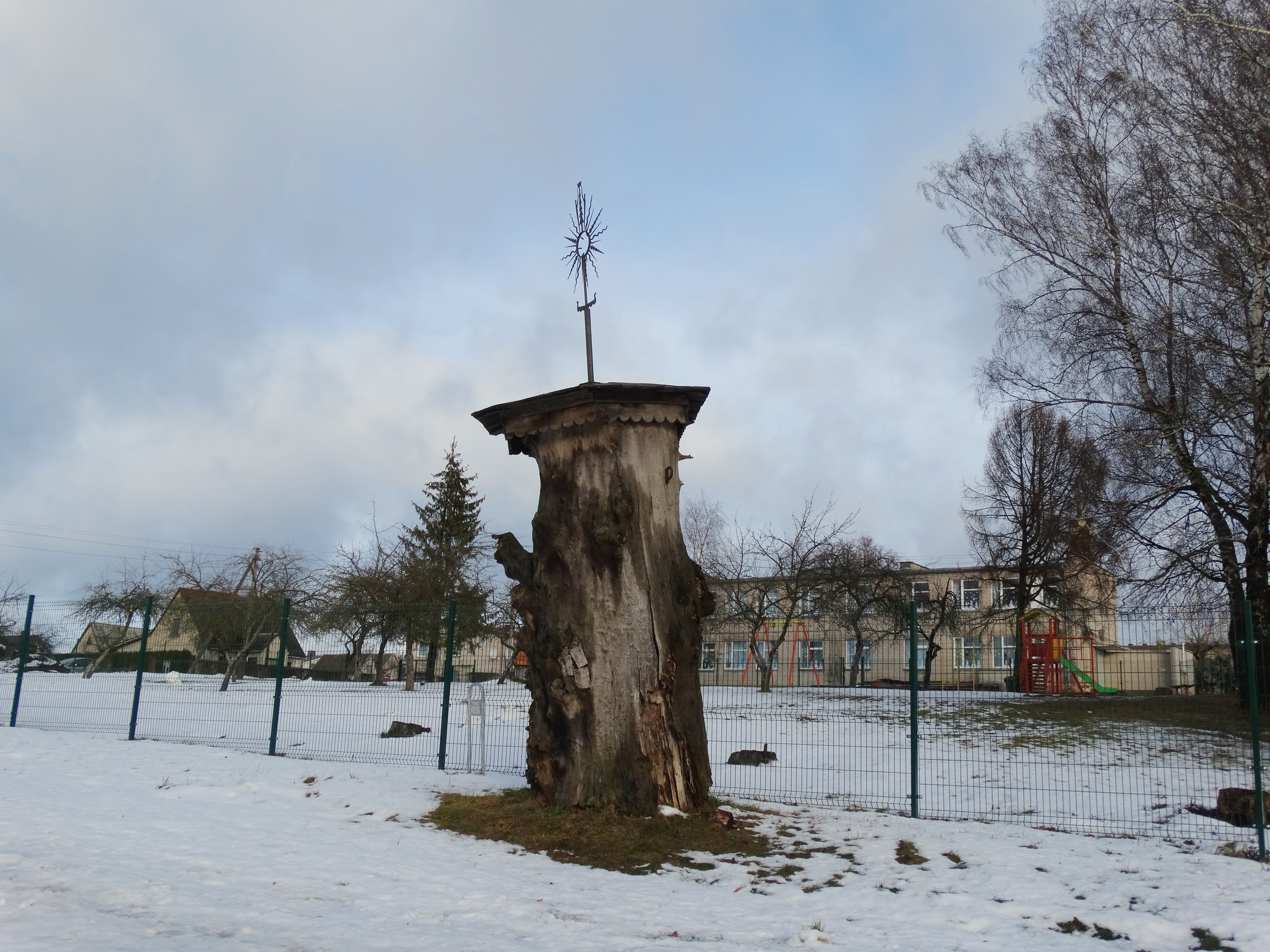
Baublys statue in Zujūnai.

== Demographics ==
According to the census of 2021, there were 7311 inhabitants in Zujūnai Eldership: 4,312 or 59% – Lithuanians, 2,133 or 29,2% – Poles, 464 or 6,3% – Russians, 88 or 1,2% – Belarusians, 43 – 0,6% Ukrainians and 272 or 3,7% – others.
