= Skaidiškės =

- City
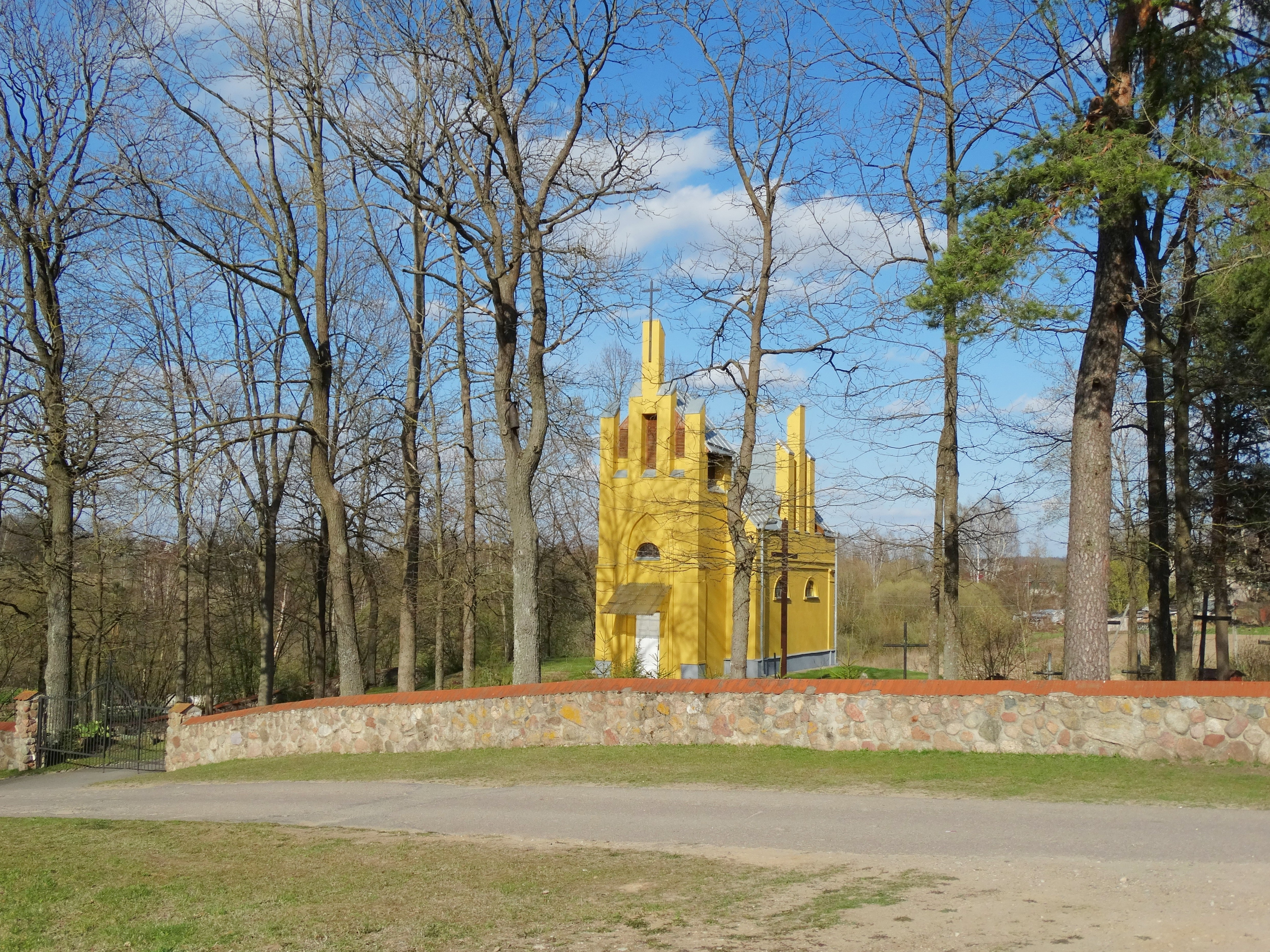
- Skaidiškės chapel in forms of Gediminas columns

- Location of Skaidiškės in Lithuania
- Coordinates: 54°36′29″N 25°23′10″E
- Country: Lithuania
- County: Vilnius County
- Municipality: Vilnius district municipality
- Eldership: Nemėžis eldership

Population (2021)
  - Total: 4,051
- Time zone: UTC+2 (EET)
  - Summer (DST): UTC+3 (EEST)

Skaidiškės is a small city in Vilnius district municipality, Vilnius County, east Lithuania.

== Geography ==
It is located about 8 kilometres (5.0 mi) east of Vilnius.

== Demographics ==
According to the Lithuanian census of 2021, the town has a population of 4051 people.
