= Medininkai =

- Village
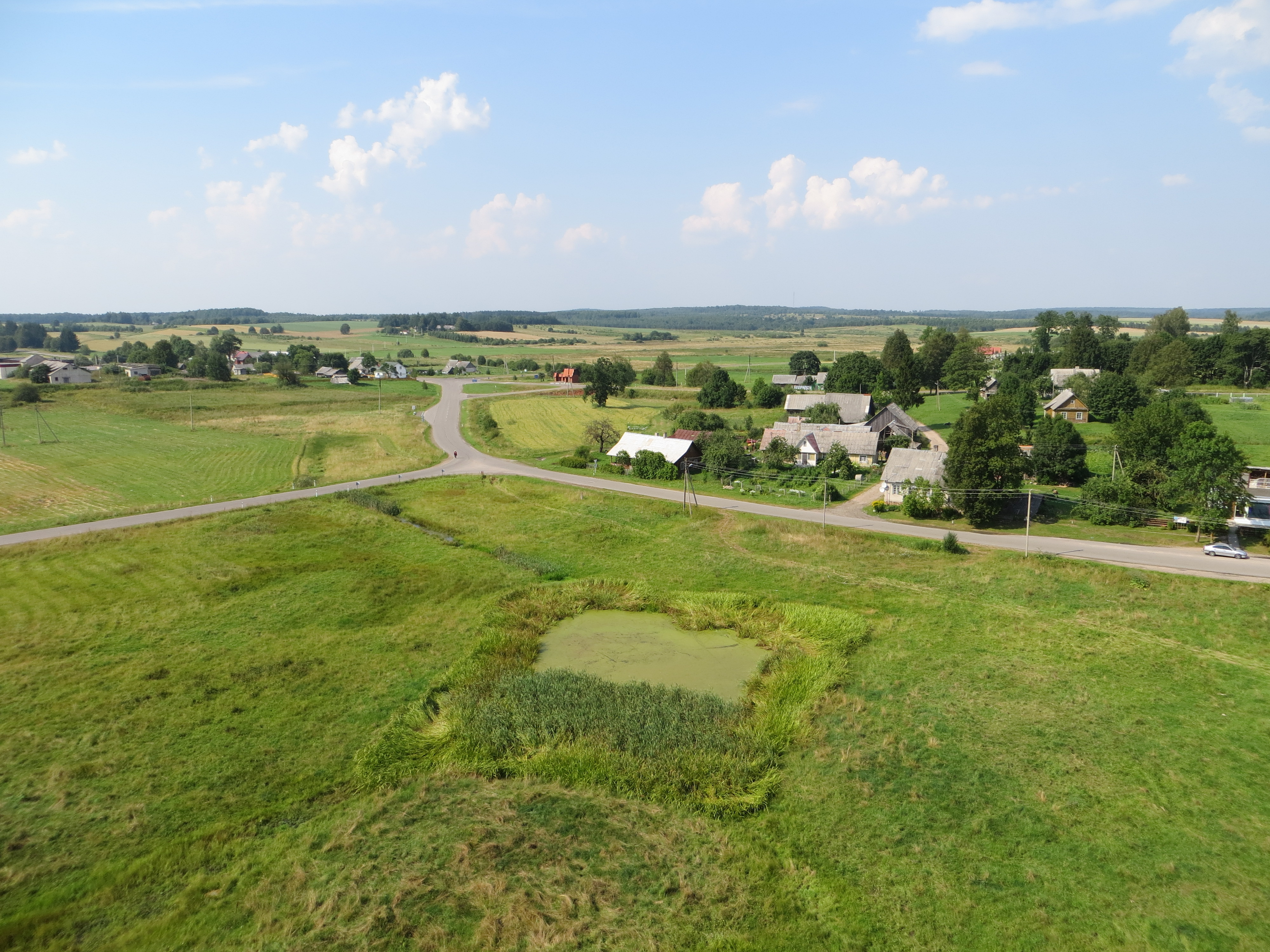
- Old centre of Medininkai

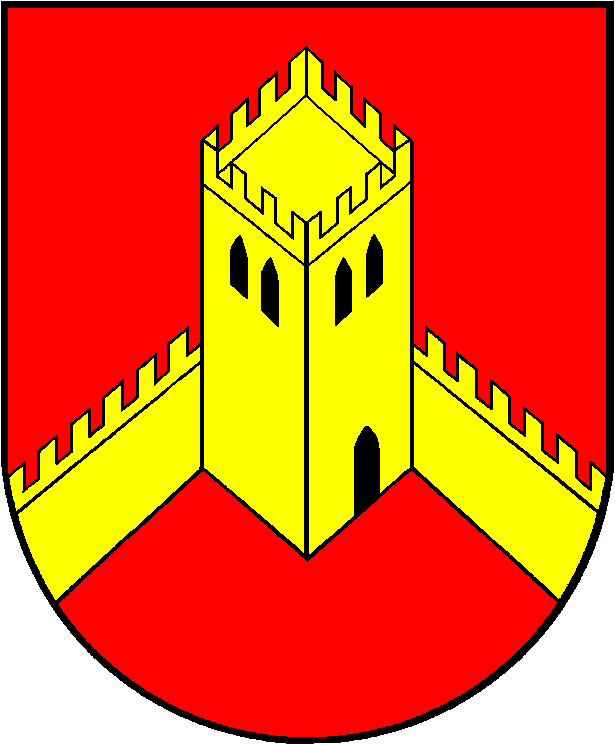
- Coat of arms

- Location of Medininkai
- Coordinates: 54°32′20″N 25°39′00″E
- Country: Lithuania
- County: Vilnius County
- Municipality: Vilnius district municipality
- Eldership: Medininkai eldership
- Capital of: Medininkai eldership

Population (2021)
  - Total: 413
- Time zone: UTC+2 (EET)
  - Summer (DST): UTC+3 (EEST)

Medininkai (Polish: Miedniki Królewskie; Belarusian: Меднікі; Russian: Ме́дники, old Russian: Мьдники) is a village in Lithuania. In terms of administration, it is centre to the Medininkai Eldership, which forms part of the Vilnius District Municipality; the district itself is in turn part of the Vilnius County. Beginnings of the village are related to the 14th century. The local castle was among the key ones in the Grand Duchy of Lithuania; in 1387, upon christening of the country, the grand duke Jogaila founded one of the first 7 churches here. Medininkai enjoyed its golden era in the late 15th century. In the early modern period the settlement reached the status of a town, but it failed to develop into a major urban centre. Over time the place was losing importance, and at the turn of the 19th and 20th centuries it was reduced to a village. The area has retained its traditionally rural character, though during recent decades it started to host transport and spedition businesses, related to the nearby Lithuania-Belarus border crossing at the Vilnius-Minsk highway. Since the early 21st century Medininkai is home to a major compound which educates border-control officials. The place enjoys some appeal among tourists; visitors are attracted by ruins of the castle, now turned into a museum, and the highest natural point in Lithuania, named Aukštojas. The village and the eldership are populated mostly by members of the Polish national minority.

== History ==
=== Beginnings (c. 13th–14th centuries) ===
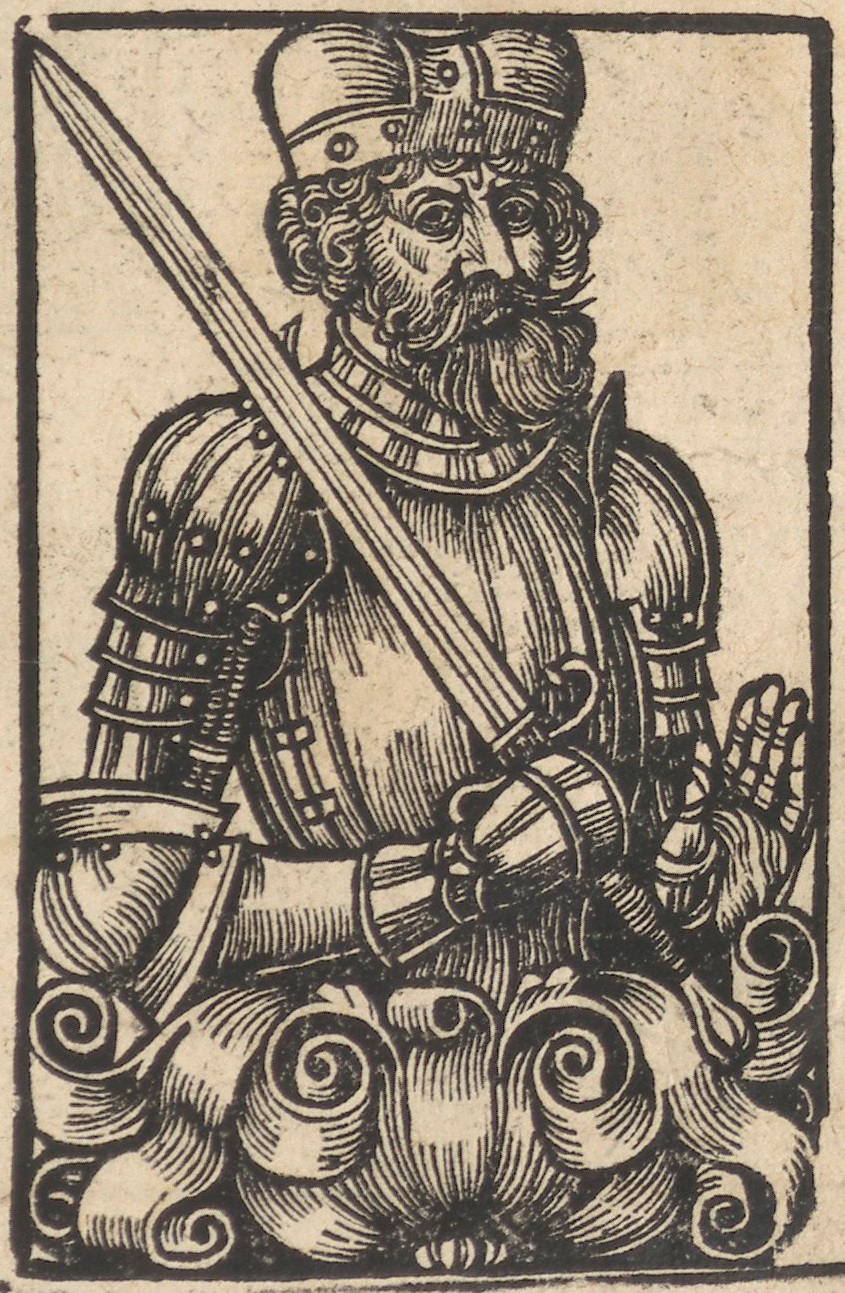
grand duke Algirdas

Beginnings of Medininkai are related to a fortress. According to some historians it might have been built already in the late 13th century, during the era of duke Traidenis; it was either him or one of minor local dukes who initiated the construction. An unclear and not necessarily reliable chronicle points rather to the early 14th century, i.e. the times of the grand duke Gedyminas. The most popular theory claims that the stronghold was built in the mid-14th century on orders of the grand duke Algirdas. It was located at the major Ashmyany route, though its exact role remains uncertain. Historiographic accounts from the 19th century, rooted in a somewhat loose interpretation of sources, advanced the theory that Algirdas and his wife were frequent visitors to the place. However, the first scientifically accepted note on the fortress is related to the year of 1385, when it was conquered by troops of the Teutonic Order, led by the grand master Konrad Zöllner von Rotenstein.

In 1387 the grand duke Jogaila abandoned paganism and adopted the Roman Catholic faith, which is usually considered as the christening of Lithuania. In an accompanying act he set up and endowed 7 churches, among them the one in Medininkai. According to historians it demonstrates that there was already some sort of settlement beyond the castle walls existent at the time. It proves also that Medininkai was among key points in the state infrastructure. The church has indeed been constructed. In 1391 Jogaila subordinated the shrine to the newly erected Bystritsa parish, where he set up the monastery of Canons of Penitence; it is most likely they who delivered religious service in the Medininkai church. The year of 1398 brings the first information about a representative of the grand duke and his powers in Medininkai; he is mentioned as a certain "Careybo" (Korejwo, Korejko). His rule was rather shaky, though; in 1402 another raid of Teutonic Order knights, this time commanded by Wilhelm von Helfenstein, seized and burnt the stronghold.

=== Development (early 15th century) ===
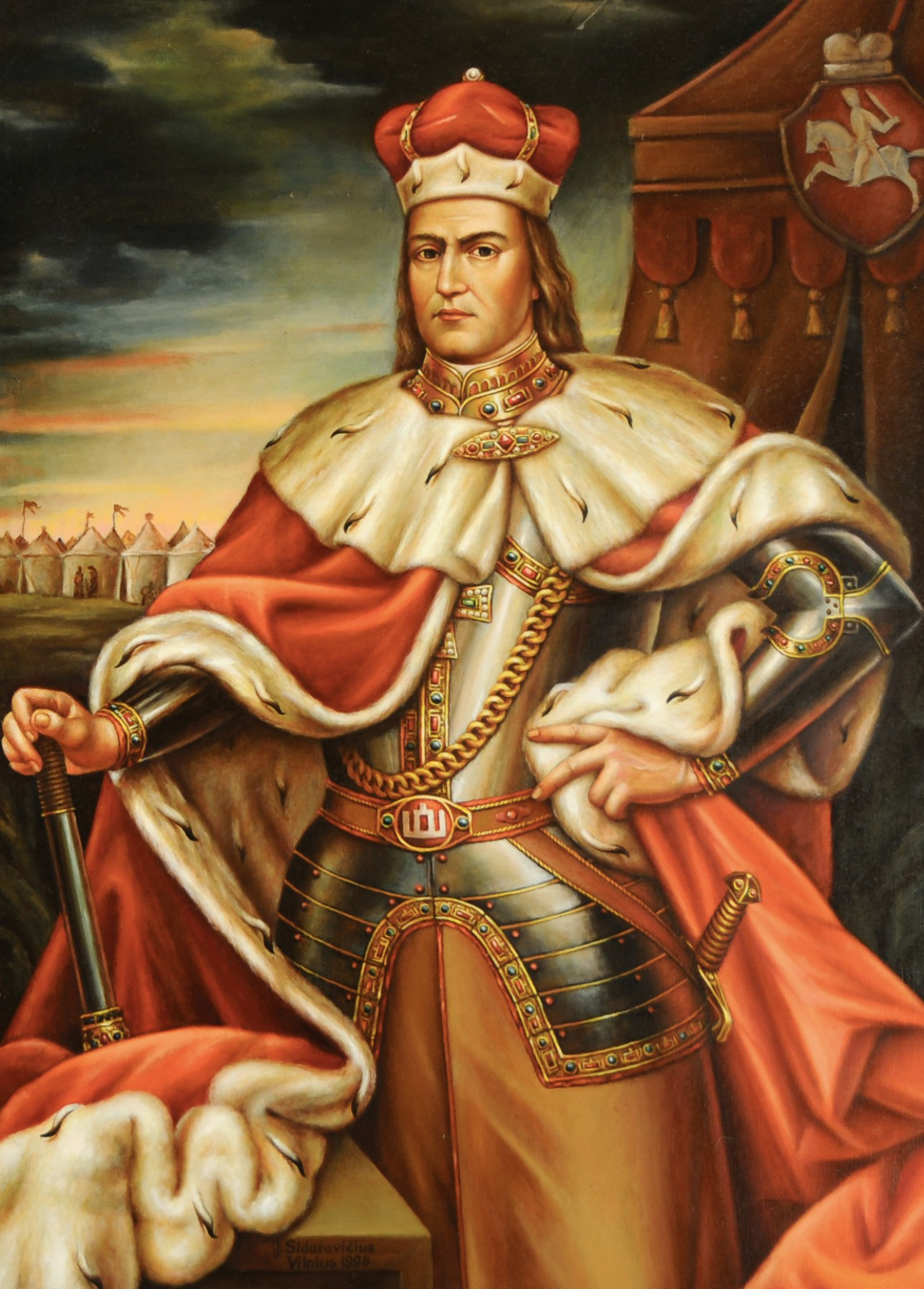
grand duke Vytautas

Since the early 15th century the rule of Lithuanian grand dukes became more stable, and the Medininkai fortress was gradually gaining importance. The grand duke Vytautas visited it a number of times, e.g. in 1415 it was there that he was writing a letter to master of the Teutonic Order, and when referring his 1426 stay a medieval chronicle notes "unsere husse Medniki". Most likely at the time the stronghold underwent major upgrade, and a previous earth-wooden structure was replaced with stone-and-brick walls with towers and bastions. In the first half of the 15th century, it was probably the largest construction of this type in Lithuania, by far larger even than the castle compound in Vilnius; its walls of 560 metres length embraced the internal yard of some 2 ha. It was then that the Medininkai boyars formed a separate military unit, named “chorągiew miednicka”; Jan Długosz noted its taking part during the Battle of Grunwald, and 4 of its commanders are known by name for the period until the mid-16th century.

The scale and character of the settlement behind the castle walls are not clear. At unspecified time a parish has been erected in Medininkai; in the mid-15th century the local church is referred to as a parish church and it is known that it operated a school for children. As the Catholic infrastructure in Lithuania was being gradually developed, the Medininkai church became one of 27 churches in the Vilnius diocese. Starting with a certain Gleb Andreevitsch, named in the document of 1453, there are 13 boyars listed as representatives of the grand duke until the mid-16th century; they were named "palatinus", "praefectus", "castellanus", or "tivunus". Usually they were holding tenures of land estates located around the castle and the settlement, though the estates remained the property of grand dukes. Feudal tenants are listed since the mid-15th century; it is known that there were 40 such tenures in the entire Vilnius voivodship.

=== Golden era (late 15th century) ===
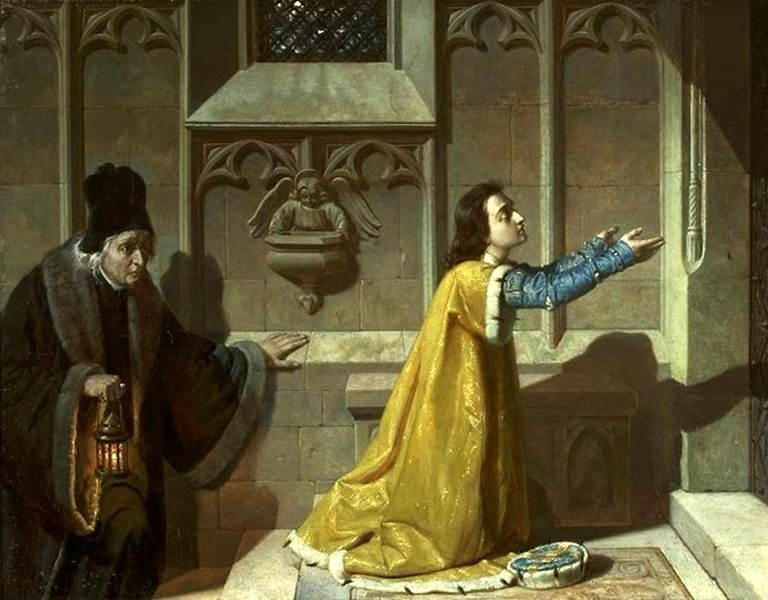
Dlugosz and prince Casimir

The second half of the 15th century marks Medininkai's golden era, the period when the place enjoyed the most prestigious status. During long strings the grand duke and the king of Poland Casimir resided in the castle “to breathe better air”; he was accompanied by his sons, especially the princes Casimir, Jan and Alexander. Their preceptor and mentor, who spent long months if not years in the castle, was Jan Długosz, a monumental figure in Polish medieval historiography. Following the death of Prince Casimir, who died already considered a quasi-saint in Lithuania, in 1484 his remnants were buried in the castle, though not clear whether in the walls or in a purpose-built sepulchral crypt; they would remain there during the following over 150 years. The place played also important ceremonial roles, e.g. in 1494 the Muscovite legacy which accompanied princess Helena, fiancé of grand duke Alexander travelling from Moscow to Vilnius, were pompously met by Lithuanian representatives in Medininkai.

The exact status of the settlement remains unclear. Some scholars claim that in the 15th century Medininkai was formally granted a borough charter, and few authors even point to the year of 1486 as the date, but details remain unknown and the reliability of this claim is disputed. Late medieval chronicles mention the place as "oppidum", which points to the castle and its military role rather than to a settlement of urban features. There is no source information on usual medieval urban self-governing bodies, like a town council or municipal judicature. It is known, though, that as the town was located on a major trade route, it was of fundamental financial importance for the dukes; a document from 1486 confirms that two inns in Medininkai were producing major gains both for the tenants and for the grand dukes. The first information on Tatars having been settled near the castle comes from the year of 1488; they inhabited the hamlet of Kurhany/Pilkapiai, later to become part of Medininkai.

=== Crisis (early 16th century) ===
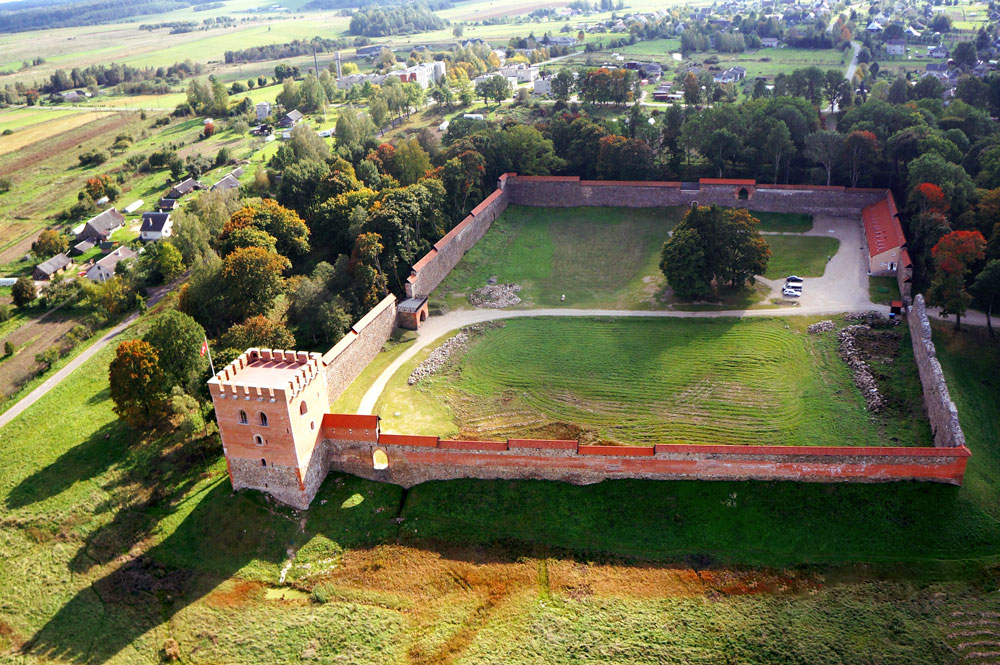
castle, present view

The Lithuanian-Muscovite war, which broke out in 1512, produced enemy incursions deep into central Lithuania. The imperial envoy Sigmund von Herberstein when coming back from Moscow in 1517 noted that he saw the Medininkai castle devastated; it is not clear whether this was the result of Muscovite troops having seized and routed the fortress or another cause, e.g. an accidental fire. None of the sources consulted mentioned that the castle performed any military role afterwards and it seems it was being gradually abandoned. Though at that time city walls were being built around Vilnius, there is no information about city walls being built around Medininkai. The local military unit continued to operate as a separate formation, e.g. on periodical review of local nobility of 1528 the boyars from the area were supposed to produce 138-men-strong cavalry detachment (out of nobility-raised 19,842 cavalry for the entire Grand Duchy); it was only in the 1560s that "chorąstwo miednickie" was incorporated into a unit raised in the entire Vilnius county, of which Medininkai formed part.

The first half of the 16th century spelled problems in terms of religious service, and it is despite the Medininkai-Bystritsa Augustians receiving new endowments and donations. The discipline within the monastery deteriorated; in 1523 the Canons left Bystritsa, and in 1528 they were removed from Medininkai for "non-compliance with rules of the order"; it was manifested e.g. by drunken episodes and dereliction of duty. Most likely at the time the church building ceased to exist; one historian speculates it might have been the result of fire. The Canons were re-established by a separate foundation in 1540 and it was then that the friars returned to the town. The new church of Holy Trinity was built centrally by the main road leading to Ashmyany, while the renewed parish and cloister received new donations from the grand duke Sigismund (1541) and his son (1560, 1562). Despite this, the parish was in legal dispute over property with local boyars.

=== Stagnation (1550 to 1650) ===
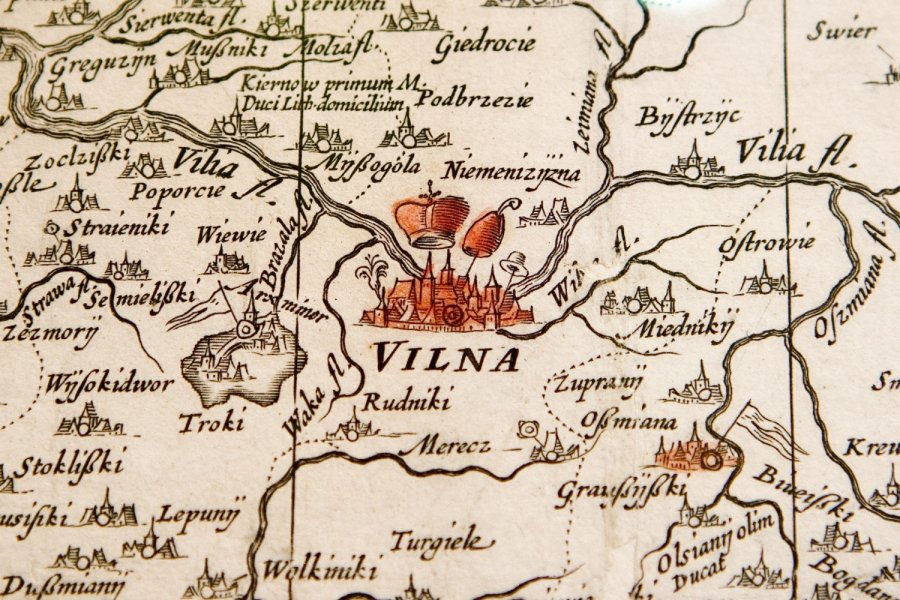
Medininkai on map, 1613

In the early modern era Medininkai was within a "fairly large, but rather poor group of towns", which evolved from medieval lower castle settlements. However, none of them developed towards a typical large urban format. On the one hand, Medininkai boasted of various privileges for the mayor and city-dwellers, e.g. these which exempted them from transportation services; on the other, none of the sources consulted contains information e.g. on staple right, and it is despite that the town was located on a busy commercial route from Vilnius eastwards. The town demonstrated some urban features like market square, castle or parish church, but it lacked city walls or bricked houses; there is neither any information on functioning of municipal self-government. The town owned some 1,250 ha, e.g. twice the amount owned by the monastery. It was also due to deliver numerous fiscal contributions, e.g. a document from 1594 lists them meticulously even for minor hamlets and settlements. It is known that Medininkai still counted among major places, e.g. the Vilnius diocese was composed of 5 so-called keys, corresponding to present-day decanates; one of them was the Medininkai key.

Extinction of the royal Yagiellonian line did not spell much change for Medininkai, except that the now electable Polish kings and Lithuanian dukes when residing in the Grand Duchy lived in Vilnius and no longer visited other locations, as was their habit before. The rule of grand duke Stephen Báthory produced further donations for the Medininkai boyars, but not for the town itself. As political and economic regime of the Duchy petrified, the landed nobility was getting increasingly influential. The 1620s are marked by expropriations and confiscations of municipal and religious estates by local boyars, which resulted in a spate of protests to the royal court. The Medininkai prestige suffered enormously in 1632, when remnants of prince Casimir, sanctified in 1602, were transferred from the castle to the newly built chapel in the Vilnius cathedral.

=== Disaster and rebirth (late 17th century) ===
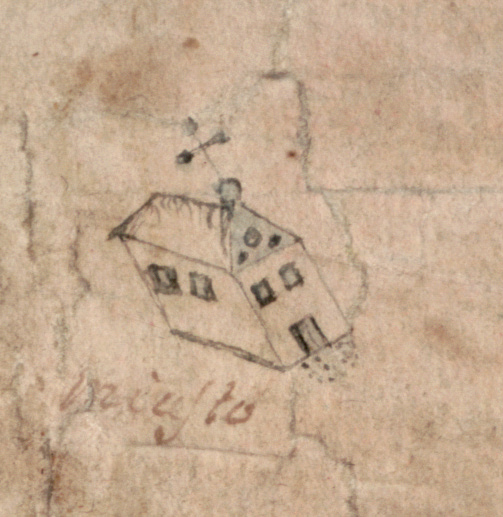
Medininkai church, 17th c.

In the early 1650s the church underwent major rehaul; it was financially supported by the royal secretary Dymitr Karp. In 1654 a rare away sitting of the Vilnius County sejmik took place in Medininkai. However, soon afterwards the town suffered the largest disaster until then. The war between the Lithuanian-Polish state and Muscovy broke out in 1654. In 1655 the Muscovite army seized most of eastern and central Lithuania and entered Vilnius; the occupation lasted until 1660. Its results were tragic; the Muscovite troops inflicted massive damage upon the area, not only by total destruction of numerous settlements, but also by abducting great share of the population into Russia. It is known that the population of Vilnius shrank from 40 to 5 thousand, though it is not clear what was the demographic loss suffered by Medininkai. It was probably enormous, as in the 1660s and 1670s there were very few children baptised in the parish church every year.

There is some statistical data available for the second half of the 17th century, based on evidence reported in the parish books. It is hence known that in 1690 Medininkai consisted of 39 houses; application of converters typical for the era suggests that the population was around 300. It was about 30% of the population of the entire parish, which comprised also neighboring villages; on its territory there were 137 households, with key villages having been Kiena/Kena (20) and Kosiny/Kuosinė (16). During half-a-century between the years of 1652 and 1702 there were 1,388 children baptised in the parish. Following demographic disaster related to the Muscovite invasion, Medininkai regained dynamics in the last two decades of the century, when on average there were 70-80 children baptised every year. However, the town has already lost its standing; a decree by grand duke Augustus II specifies some fiscal duties named podwody for every town of the Vilnius voivodship; Medininkai was obliged to pay 15 złoty per annum, the same amount as Niemenczyn/Nemenčinė; the neighboring Ashmyany was obliged to pay 30 złoty.

=== Last years of the Grand Duchy (18th century) ===
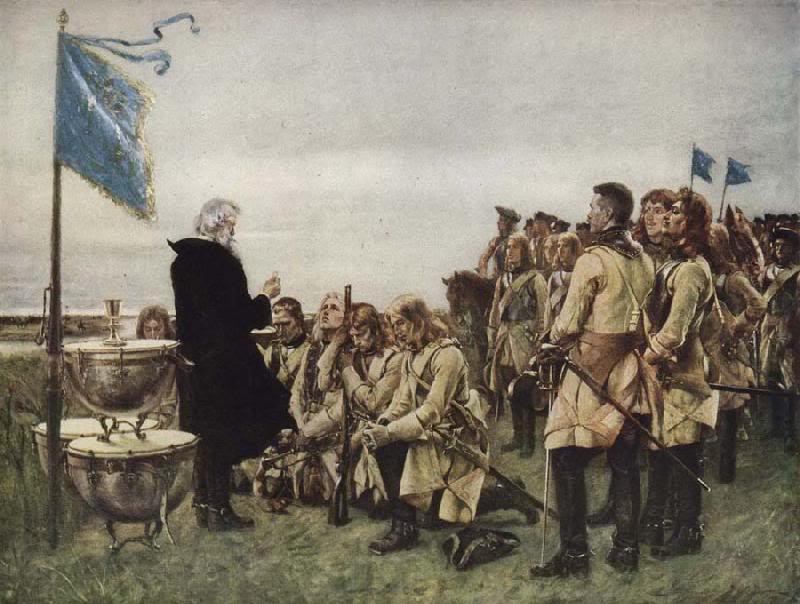
Swedish troops, Northern War

None of the sources consulted mentions the fate of Medininkai during the Northern War. In 1702 Vilnius was captured by the Swedish army, but it is not known whether the Swedes garrisoned the town before in 1708 the region was seized by Russian troops, theoretically allied with the grand duke Augustus. Medininkai was undergoing the period of moderate territorial growth; the 1730 inventory of municipal estates for the first time listed some new hamlets, like Kamienny Ług. In the Saxon times the parish also recorded demographic growth, as in the mid-18th century on average there were some 135 children baptised every year; such figures were recorded again only in the mid-1920s, once the parish would be re-erected. During the early rule of the grand duke Stanisław August Poniatowski the parish counted 367 houses, it is some 2.7 times more than the figure recorded 100 years earlier; the census from 1781 recorded 3.482 Catholics in the parish. The town consisted of a market square and 6 streets.

In 1778 the fire broke out in religious premises and the 250-year-old church was burnt down to the ground. Reconstruction works commenced a few years later and probably in 1788 a new, already third shrine, was completed; it was also a wooden building. For reasons which are not clear it got consecrated 3 years later, in 1791, again dedicated to the Holy Trinity. In the 1780s and 1790s the Canons monastery, still operational in the town, was running a primary school. Its books indicate that boys "of urban descent" prevailed, though there were also boys "of rural descent" and exceptionally also few "of noble descent". The Augustians were also running a small hospital for the poor, but for most of the 18th century the monastery was related to scandals resulting from lack of discipline. According to some sources Medininkai was "in the possessions of Duke Radziwiłł". Administrationwise until the third partition of the Lithuanian-Polish Commonwealth Medininkai formed part of the Vilnius county in the Vilnius voivodship; in 1795 with remnants of the Grand Duchy it was incorporated into the imperial Russia.

=== Post-partition and Napoleonic periods (early 19th century) ===
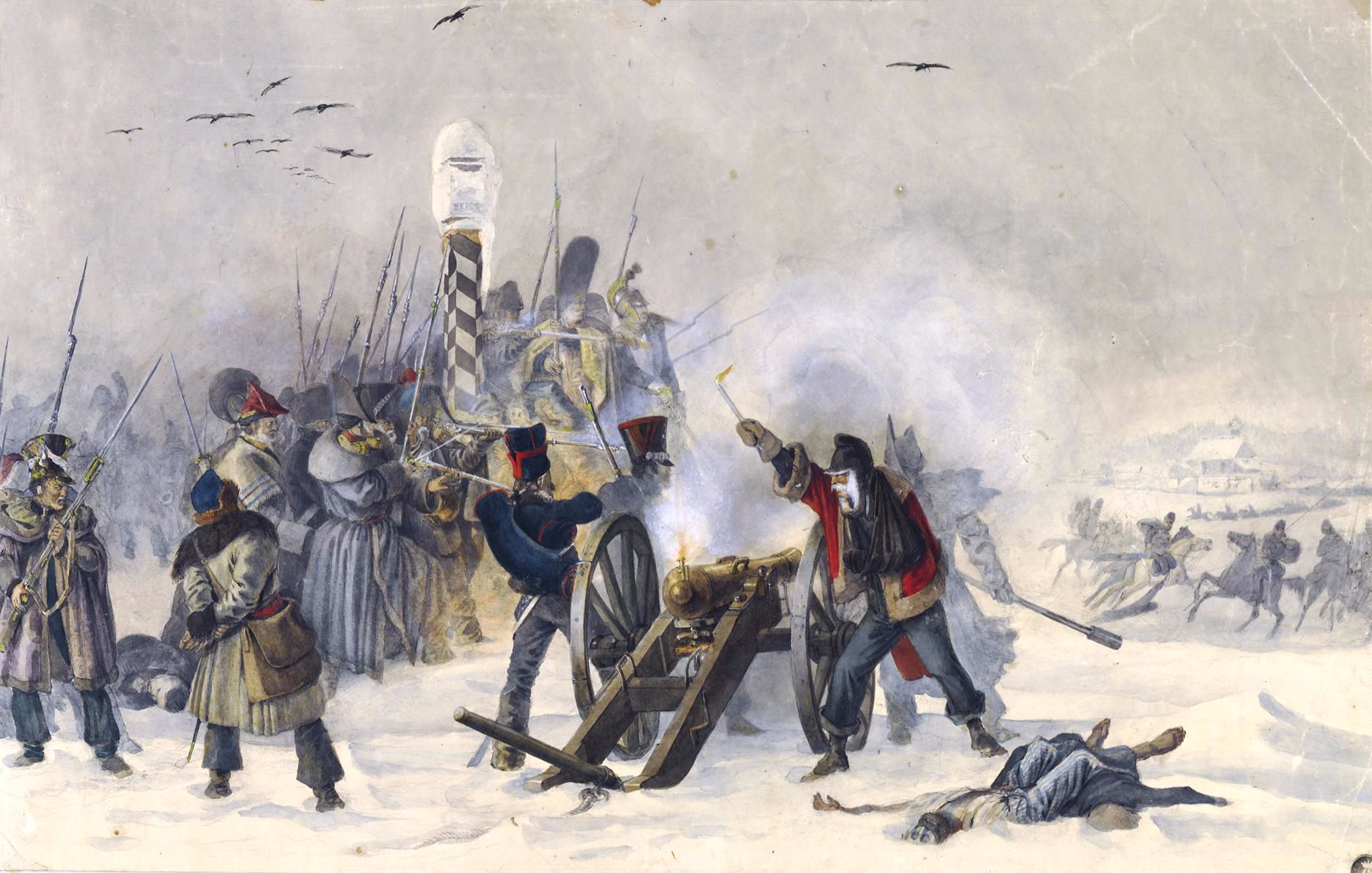
Grande Armée near Medininkai

In Russia Medininkai formed part of Ви́ленский уе́зд within the Виленская губерния. This period is marked by property transformations. Estates around the town, which until the end of the Commonwealth belonged to grand dukes, were seized by the imperial economy. Then they were put on sale and acquired by Ignacy Grabowski, previously a high functionary of the Grand Duchy Tribunal. When taking possession of his new property in 1796 he seized also the Augustian hospital, evicted the sick and took over the estate; the county court ordered him to give back the land and the premises, but it is not clear to what effect. Grabowski, who in new political conditions became counselor to His Imperial Majesty, kept harassing the town; as owner of the inn in 1802 he sent his men to assault the tenant of the competitive, Augustian inn.

Another disastrous year in the history of Medininkai was 1812. The French Grand Armee, during their withdrawal from Russia was back in central Lithuania. In extremely harsh winter conditions (on Dec 6 the temperature in Medininkai was -37,5 °C) when seeking wood to warm up, the troops stationed in the town burnt down all facilities within the castle and destroyed a large part of the town itself; the French also looted the place before withdrawing further west. Grabowski continued his private war; 1815 marks another assault of his men, who robbed municipal property and cut down much of the municipal forest. The same year the presbytery was destroyed by fire, it is not clear whether the result of arson or an accident. The parochial census of 1827 documents another period of demographic regress; it recorded 208 households and 1,386 faithful, merely 40% of the population listed in the census carried out 46 years earlier. Medininkai was not even marked on a Russian map from the 1820s, though it was located on a major route and though similar or minor neighboring locations, like Rukojnie/Rukainiai, Kiena/Kena or Turgiele/Turgeliai were marked; even the Kamienny Ług hamlet was acknowledged.

=== The Risings Period (mid-19th century) ===
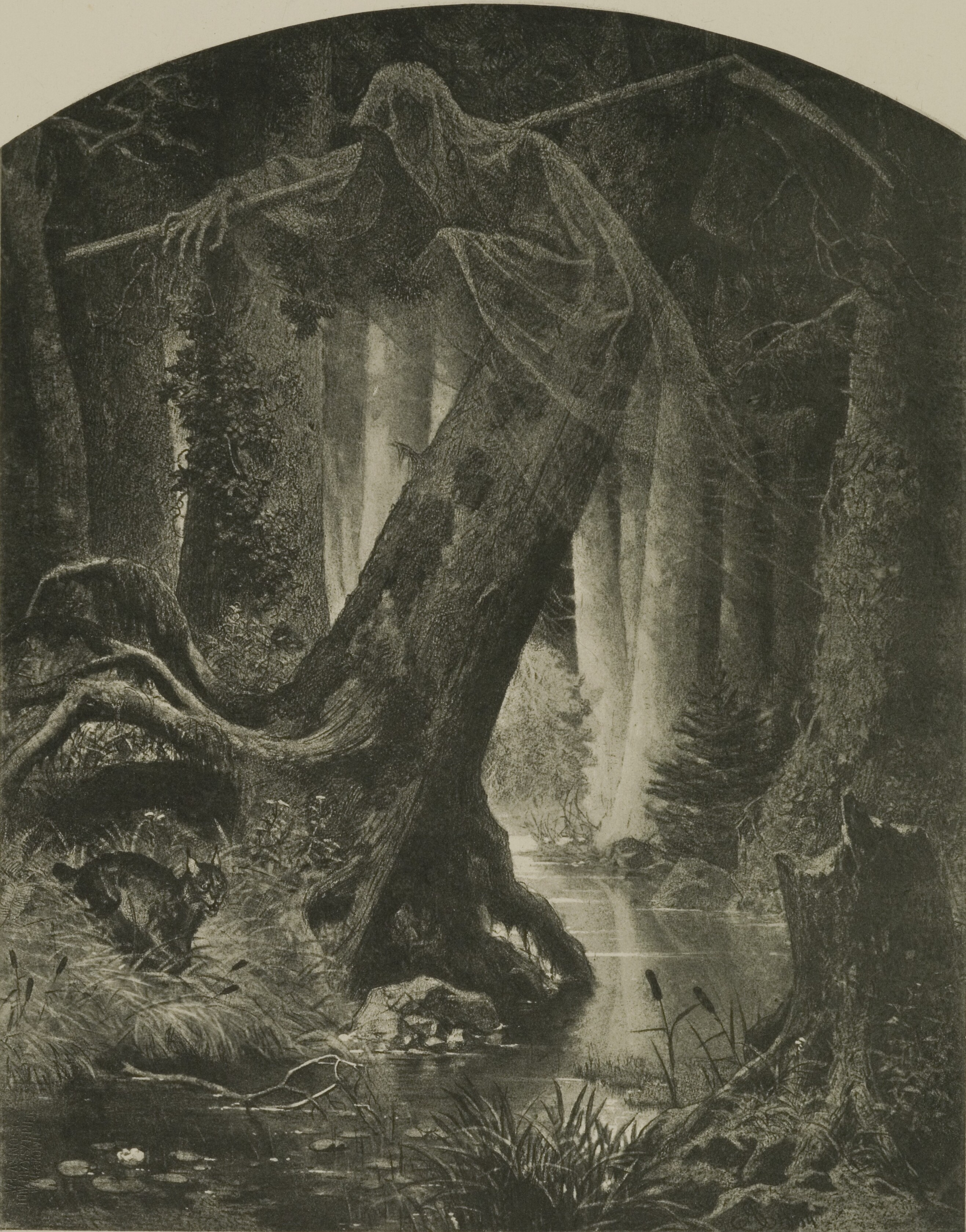
Lithuania by Grottger

During the November Rising the insurgents took control of the neighboring Ashmyany in the spring of 1831, but none of the sources consulted notes any rebel activity in Medininkai, except some insurgents receiving assistance in the nearby estate of the Koziełł-Poklewski family. Despite this, having re-taken control the Russian administration embarked on a repressive course. In late 1831 the Canons following some 400 years of service were forced to abandon the village. The full-scale drama unfolded in 1832, when the governorate officials closed down the church and declared the parish dissolved. The faithful were distributed among the neighboring parishes of Turgiele/Turgeliai, Taboryszki/Tabariškės and Rukojnie/Rukainiai; Medininkai was assigned to the Taboryszki parish. In 1834 the building of the closed church was disassembled and materiel was moved to the Soły/Salos village, where it was re-assembled as the new church of the local parish community.

At the time the owner of the Medininkai estate was first the son of Ignacy Grabowski, Józef and then his relative Apolinary Grabowski, major of the imperial Russian army and deputy chairman of the Vilnius county nobility. Under his rule the economy got heavily indebted; in the 1850s a certain Zofia Kamińska purchased Grabowski's payable notes and became the next owner. In 1857 she was permitted to build a small chapel, completed the same year near foundations of the disassembled church. Kamińska ensured also the religious service, though formal status of a priest saying the mass is not clarified. After 3 years and in unknown circumstances the priest was moved to the Carmelitan monastery in Vilnius; also in 1860 the chapel was demolished. At that time the town was visited by a Polish writer Władysław Syrokomla; his late-romantic account dedicated to ruins of the castle was published as part of a book, which went to print in 1860. During the January Rising in the spring of 1863 Medininkai proved a recruitment ground for an insurgent detachment of Józef Śniadecki.

=== Post-rising period (late 19th century) ===
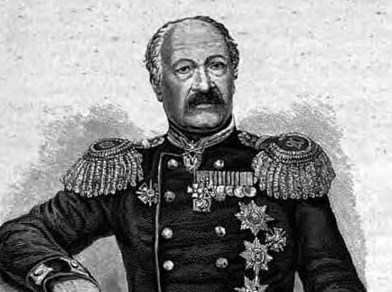
general Labyntsev

In the second half the 19th century Medininkai was getting furtherly marginalised. One of the reasons was the 1873-built railway line from Vilnius to Minsk; it bypassed the village running some 2 km north of the Ashmyany road, and the nearest station turned to be Kiena/Kena, some 12 km away. According to data from 1885 the Medininkai population was 297, mostly Catholics. At this time the estate again changed hands; after the Kamiński family, its new owner was general Ivan Mikhailovich Labyntsev; he took over also the former religious property, of unclear status since the parish and monastery had been closed down. Following the abolition of serfdom and gradual enfranchisment, estates started to become the property of local peasants, turning into independent farmers; documents from the 1880s note that the land near Medininkai was the property of „generała Łabińcowa i włościan”. It is not clear who inherited the estate once Labyntsev died; a document from 1897 notes as "the sole heir" his granddaughter Katarzyna Drohojowska née Komar, but later data lists as the owner her mother, Elżbieta Komarowa, daughter to general Labyntsev.

Following the administrative reform from the turn of the centuries Medininkai formed part of the Szumsk/Šumskas Commune (Шумская волость), which in turn formed part of the Vilnius County (Виленский уезд) in the Vilnius Governorate. The official census of 1905 lists 9 separate settlements named "Мьдники". Though at the turn of the centuries the place was still officially considered a town, in the census mentioned it is already categorized as "деревня" (village). The exact date when Medninkai lost its urban status is not known; most likely it was re-categorized with no tangible practical implications. The village listed consisted of 269 inhabitants. However, all settlements named Мьдники, in the census usually categorized as "усадьба" (hamlet), together numbered 415 inhabitants. The census listed separately hamlets and colonies which are now often considered parts of Medininkai, like Курганы (Kurhany, 222 inhabitants) or Язово (Józefowo, 34).

=== Crisis and war (early 20th century) ===
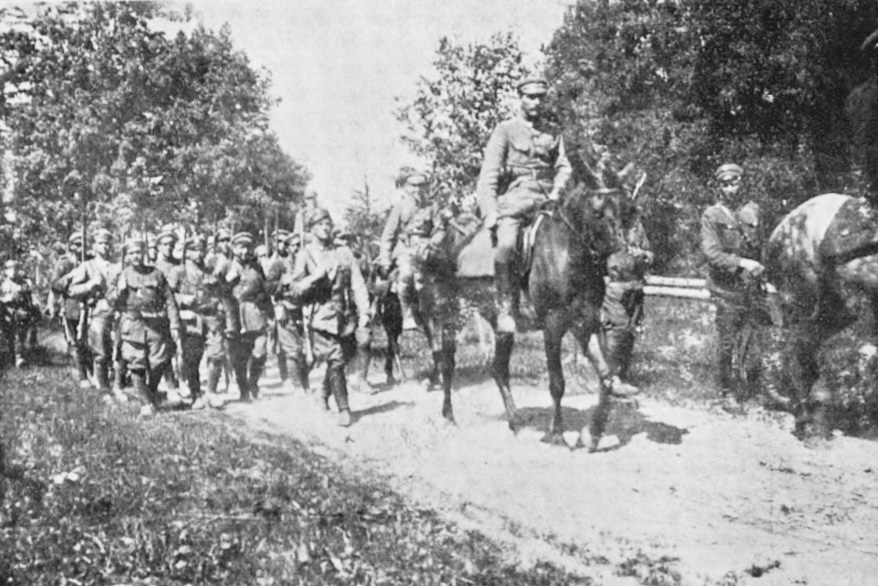
Polish eastern troops

In 1900–1902 the villagers tried to get the parish re-established; eventually the Russian administration did not consent. Already in 1905 the villagers resumed their efforts; this time they addressed the religious hierarchy; in a letter to the Vilnius bishop Edward Ropp they noted that there had been a new church constructed in Ławaryszki/Lavoriškės, so the old one might be moved to Medininkai. However, there were also other villages who set their eyes on the Ławaryszki/Lavoriškės building; the matter got stuck in the bishopic bureaucracy and has not been solved until the collapse of the Russian rule in the area. In the early 20th century there was a 3-grade Russian school operational in the village; in 1911 there were 34 boys attending the classes.

In September 1915 the Vilnius region was seized by the German army. In 1916 the bishop agreed to the parish having been re-established in the village and a church to be built. In 1917 a temporary chapel was constructed; the new parish accounted for 3,287 faithful, most of them taken over from the Taboryszki/Tabariškės parish. During the following few years the village changed hands a few times. In January 1919 the withdrawing Germans were replaced by the Bolsheviks; in April 1919 the Bolsheviks were driven away by the Polish army; in July 1920 the Poles were driven away by the Bolshevik troops; in August 1920 the Bolsheviks handed over to the newly born Lithuanian Republic; in October 1920 the area was seized by Polish units, who for the sake of international politics posed as in mutiny against the Warsaw government. None of the sources consulted provides information on the fate of Medininkai during these turbulent times. During elections to so-called Vilnius Parliament, organized under the provisional Polish rule within allegedly an independent state of Central Lithuania, Medininkai formed part of the Wilno Południe electoral district. Results below the district level are not known. In April 1922 Medininkai and the entire Vilnius region was incorporated into Poland.

=== In Poland (1922–1939) ===
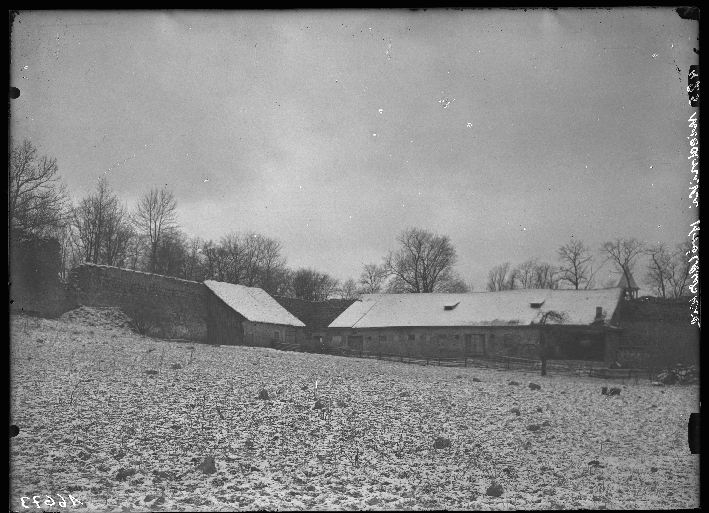
castle, interwar period

Within the Polish republic Medininkai formed part of the Szumsk/Šumskas Commune within the Vilnius County, itself part of the Vilnius Voivodeship. In the fall of 1921, during the first official census, the village was beyond the state frontiers; the following census, dated 1931, recorded 79 households and 504 inhabitants. It excluded minor colonies and settlements which are now de facto parts of Medininkai, like Kurhany/Pilkapiai (45 houses, 249 inhabitants) or Józefowo/Juozapinė (respectively 14 and 64) Religious statistics reveals similar data; in 1927 the entire parish amounted to 2,877 faithful, in 1931 to 3,017, and in 1934 to 3,287. The latter comprised 502 faithful in Medininkai alone; other major locations were Kurhany/Pilkapiai (294), Żemajtele/Žemaitėliai (223), Gudzie/Gudai (201), Podwarańce/Padvarionys (197), Dworce/Dvarčiai (181), Bojary/Bajorai (127) and Wołkogule/Valkagulia (116). The community was almost entirely Catholic; there were merely 3 Orthodox faithful and a handful of Jews recorded.

The overwhelming majority of the Medininkai neighbourhood residents were farmers or agricultural workers; apart from few small brickyards and sawmills there were no industrial facilities in the area. Migration to Vilnius and other urban centres was minor. Elżbieta Komarowa, who commenced parcelation of her possessions already in 1908, was anxious that implementation of agrarian reform might prove disastrous; she decided to sell the rest of her estates in advance, before the law comes into force. The process was marked by tension and conflict; when the villagers decided to purchase a plot for a future church, intervention of the official land estate office was needed to get the deal done. Location of the plot purchased was not very convenient, as it was placed somewhat away from the village, on the other side of the castle ruins. In 1927 the villagers purchased the closed church in Rukojnie/Rukainiai. It was disassembled and re-assembled in Medininkai, consecrated in 1929; it was the sixth subsequent shrine in the village. In the 1920s there were schools open in Medininkai (180 students), Podwarańce/Padvarionys, Żemajtele/Žemaitėliai and Nielidziszki/Nelidiskai; after the so-called Jędrzejewicz reform there was one 6-grade school in Medininkai.

=== Second World War (1939–1944) ===
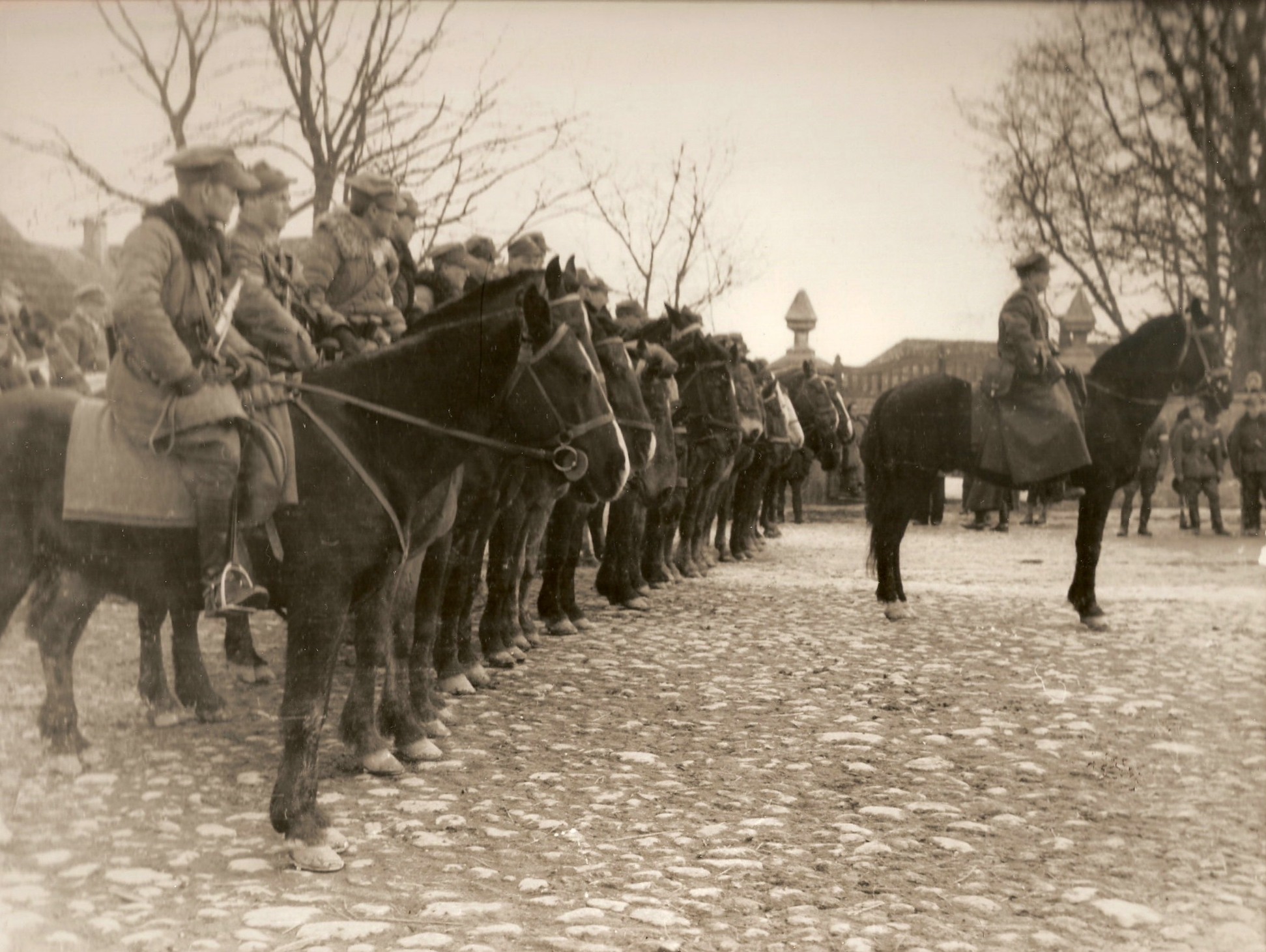
AK near Medininkai, 1944

Following the Soviet invasion of Poland on September 17, 1939, two days later Medininkai was seized by the Red Army with no combat recorded. After a month, in late October the area was ceded by the Soviets to the Republic of Lithuania. The newly established Lithuanian-Soviet frontier separated Medininkai from some of its remote settlements, e.g. Kamienny Ług as part of the Ashmyany County became part of the Byelorussian SSR; this was also the fate of some more distant fields, which belonged to Medininkai villagers. In June 1940 the village and the entire Lithuania was incorporated into the USSR as the Lithuanian Soviet Socialist Republic; administrationwise it formed part of the Szumsk/Šumskas Commune within the Vilnius County. In June 1941 Medininkai were seized by the Wehrmacht, which commenced over 3 years of German occupation.

Since 1943 the territory south-east of Vilnius as part of so-called Inspectorate A of the underground Home Army became operational area of Polish partisan units. In early 1944 they were developed into a battalion-size 3. Wileńska Brygada Armii Krajowej. It carried out a number of combat operations against the Germans and during brief spells controlled minor locations, like Szumsk/Šumskas or Turgiele/Turgeliai; it is known that on February 23, 1944, its sub-units mounted an ambush near Medininkai, but it is not clear whether the battalion has ever seized the village itself. In early July 1944 the joint command of Home Army units, assembled to capture Vilnius, was located in the village of Wołkorabiszki, some 8 km from Medininkai. Following a successful joint Home Army and Soviet operation the Red Army and the NKVD started to detain Polish combatants; they were held prisoners within the walls of the Medininkai castle ruins. It is estimated that on July 20 there were between 4 and 6 thousand disarmed Home Army POWs amassed in the yard of the castle. By August they were marched to the Kiena railway station, loaded into trains and transported to Kaluga.

=== Soviet Lithuania, early decades (1945–1965) ===
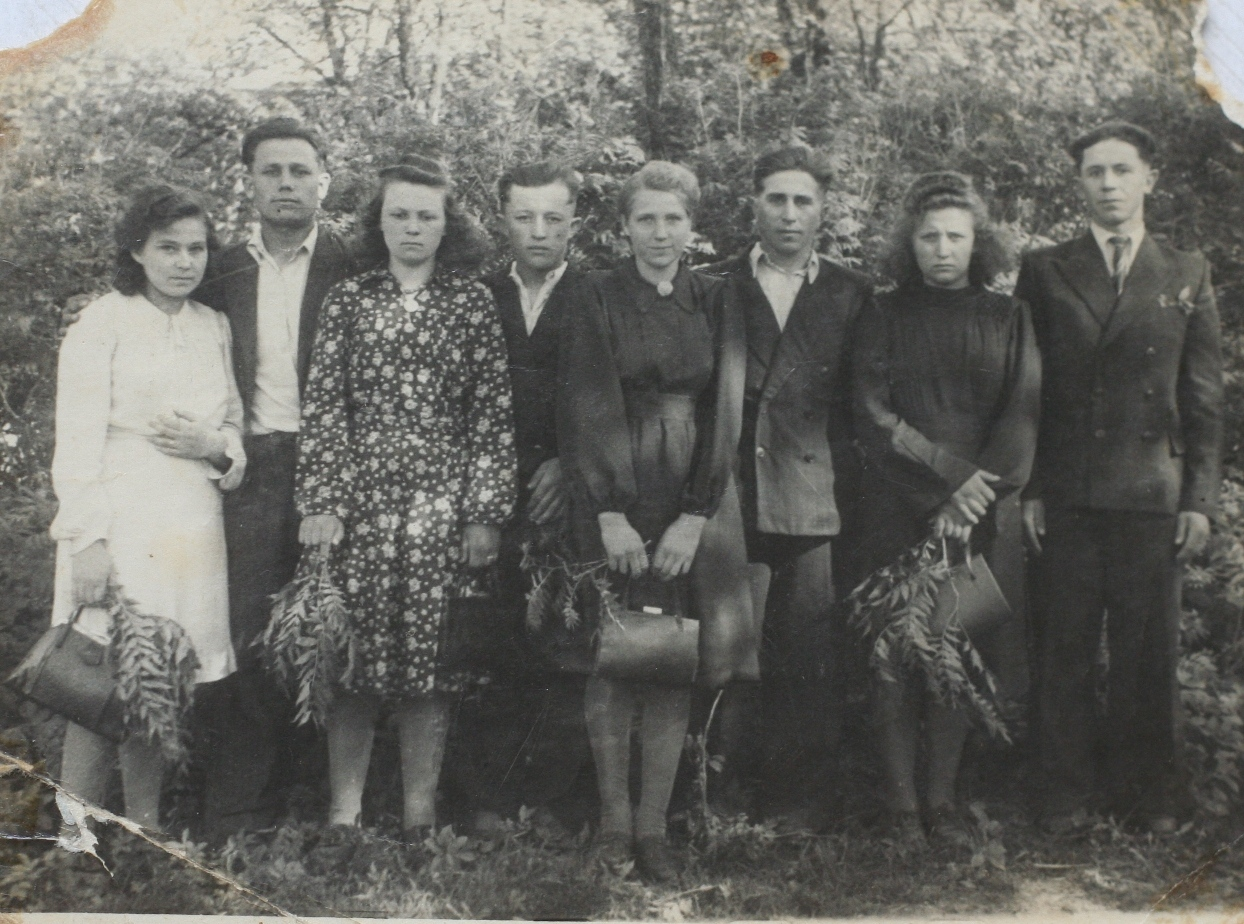
Medininkai youth, around 1950

Within the re-built Soviet Lithuanian structures Medininkai was again incorporated into the Szumsk/Šumskas Commune. Very few of its inhabitants decided to join the organized transfer of Poles into Poland, and almost all preferred to stay on their family economy. However some farmers, usually owners of larger properties who employed hired workforce, were dubbed kulaks and enemies of the working people. In 1948-1952 53 people, which was around 2% of the parish population, were sentenced to a penal settlement in Siberia (mostly in the Tomsk Oblast’). In case of some hamlets, like Józefowo/Juozapinė, the rate of the deported reached 11%. The deportees who survived returned to Medininkai or travelled further west to Poland, some as late as in the late 1950s. At the turn of the 1940s and 1950s the forced collectivisation began; the village started to host the “Red Banner” kolkhoz. Following the 1950 administrative reform Medininkai became the centre of the Medininkai Commune in the Nowa Wilejka/Naujoji Vilnia County.

According to the Soviet standard, theoretically the official languages in Medininkai were the republican one, i.e. Lithuanian, and the pan-Soviet Russian. In practice the Kolkhoz language was either Russian or "po prostemu", a rural mixture of Polish and Belarusian. The school, opened in the late 1940s, adopted Polish as the language of instruction, though the management layer was formed by Russians. Until the late 1950s the school educated students until late teenage; in 1956-8 there were 25 boys and girls who completed the curriculum. Later the school switched to 8th grade profile, and since then there was no school above the primary school level in Medininkai. In 1959 Nowa Wilejka/Naujoji Vilnia was incorporated into Vilnius; as a result, the Medininkai Commune was moved from the Naujoji Vilnia County to the Vilnius County. In 1963 the commune was dissolved and Medninkai was incorporated into the newly established Podwarance/Padvarionys Commune, but 1965 marked return to the old setup. What ratio of villagers were members of the Communist Party is unclear.

=== Soviet Lithuania, late decades (1965–1990) ===
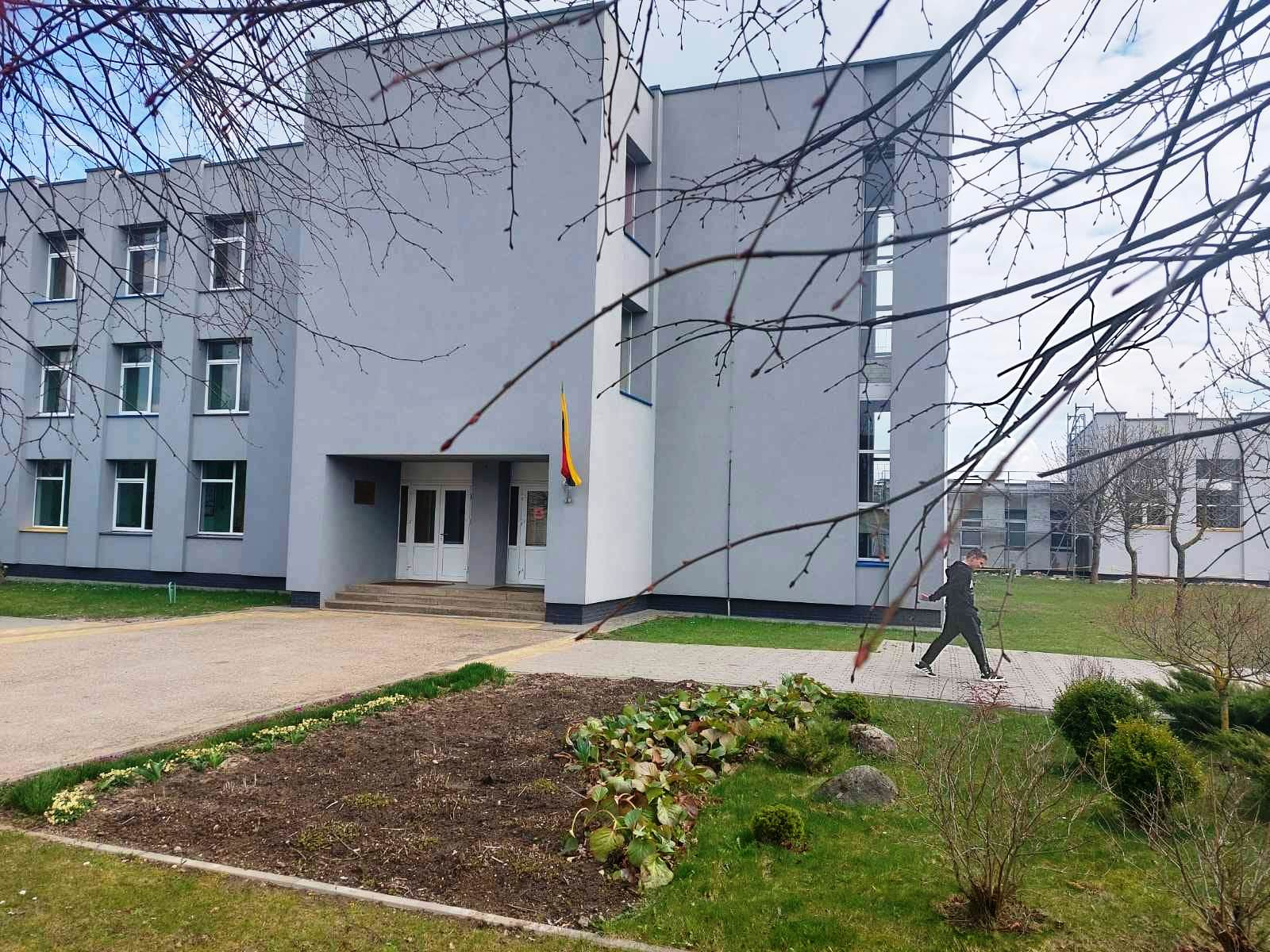
Medininkai school (present view)

Medininkai and surroundings remained a typical agricultural area, with no industrial facilities built. What change the village was a housing estate, developed by the Kolkhoz for its employees since the mid-1970s. Buildings were located along a network of streets south of the church. As a result, the historical west–east axis of the village, running below the castle, was reduced to secondary role; the centre of gravity moved above the ruins, along the north–south axis. Traditional centre of the village gradually became an empty crossroads also because of the major infrastructural investment in the region: the Vilnius-Minsk highway, completed in the late 1970s. It was some 2 km north and parallel to historical route from Medininkai to Ahmyeny. It spared the village the nuisance of growing heavy traffic, but on the other hand it turned Medininkai into a backwater spot with agricultural machinery and horse carts having been most or the only vehicles.

The village was plugged into the electric power grid in the early 1960s. Ruins of the Medininkai castle twice underwent some conservation works, for the first time at the turn of the 1950s and 1960s, and then in the early 1970s. In both cases there were minor excavation works carried out, while the major objective was ensuring that the crumbling walls would not decay further on. In 1967 a modern, large school building was completed. In 1981 there were new modules added: a gym hall, canteen and library; there was also an outdoor sport compound built. In the 1970s and 1980s some 40-50 students were completing education every year. Other investments visible until today are 4 residential multi-flat blocks, a large kindergarten, the community office and a shop. The less visible investments are the water supply network and the partially completed sewage system. Because of fairly decent public bus transport and 1-hour-commuting time more and more villagers decided to seek employment in Vilnius and commuted each day to and from the city. Except brief periods, religious service was continuously offered in the church every Sunday.

=== Reborn Lithuania (late 20th century) ===
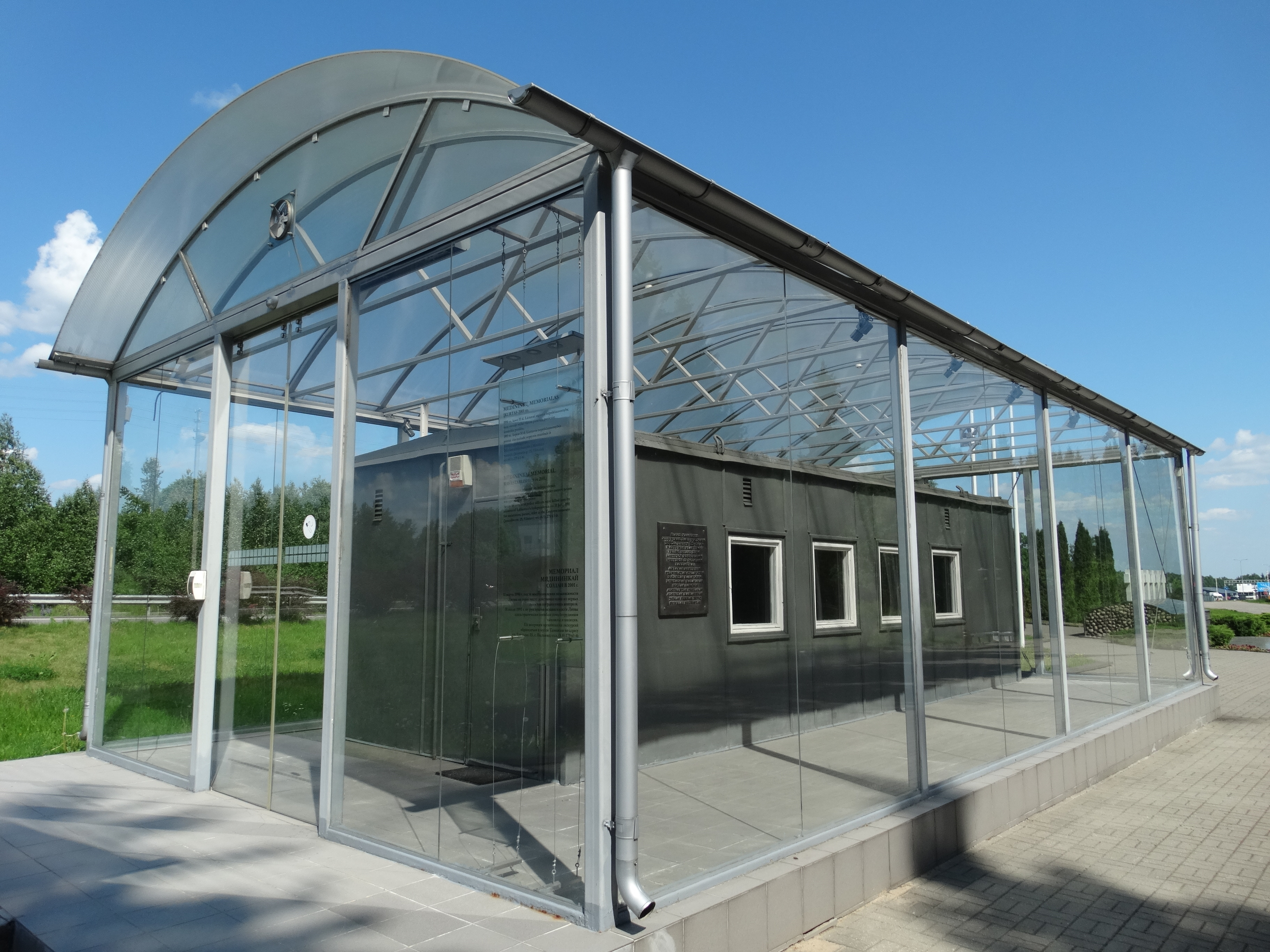
memorial to 1991 victims

In wake of decomposition of the USSR in 1988 the Medininkai Commune protested against planned legislation, which would strengthen position of the Lithuanian language; in 1989 the Supreme Soviet of LSRR ignored the protest. During emergence of the reborn Lithuanian state Medininkai was witness to an obscure episode, not fully explained until today; on July 31, 1991, 7 officials of the Lithuanian customs, border and security services were killed at the border crossing. According to Lithuanian juridical authorities, they were victims of the Soviet OMON troops. What used to be the internal Soviet border between the Byelorussian SRR and the Lithuanian SRR turned into a state frontier between the independent states of Lithuania and Belarus; it ran some 2 km from the centre of Medininkai. In 1994 the post-Soviet local self-government, Council of People's Deputies, was dissolved. In 1995 the third-level admin unit, the Medininkai Eldership (Medininkų seniūnija), was set up. Its headquarters was in Medininkai and the eldership formed part of the Vilnius Area County (Vilniaus rajono savivaldybė), which in turn formed part of the Vilnius Region (Vilniaus apskritis). The same year the first local elections were held; both at the commune level and at the county level the strongest part turned out to be the Electoral Action of Poles in Lithuania; the first elected mayor was Czesław Ancukiewicz.

In line with general political and economic change the "Red Banner" kolkhoz was disbanded, and its estates and properties were divided among local coopratives, enterprises and private individuals; some plots expropriated half a century earlier returned to heirs of the original owners. Nearby border crossing at the key highway between Vilnius and Minsk triggered emergence of business from logistics and transport sectors. In the early 1990s a member of the Polish branch of the Franciscan order settled in Medininkai; few others followed. In 1994 a small Franciscan monastery was set up in the village, the first one after the Augustians had been evicted 163 years earlier. Very briefly the monastery consisted also of a postulate and a novitiate, moved to Vilnius by the end of the decade.

== Present day ==
=== Administration and demography ===
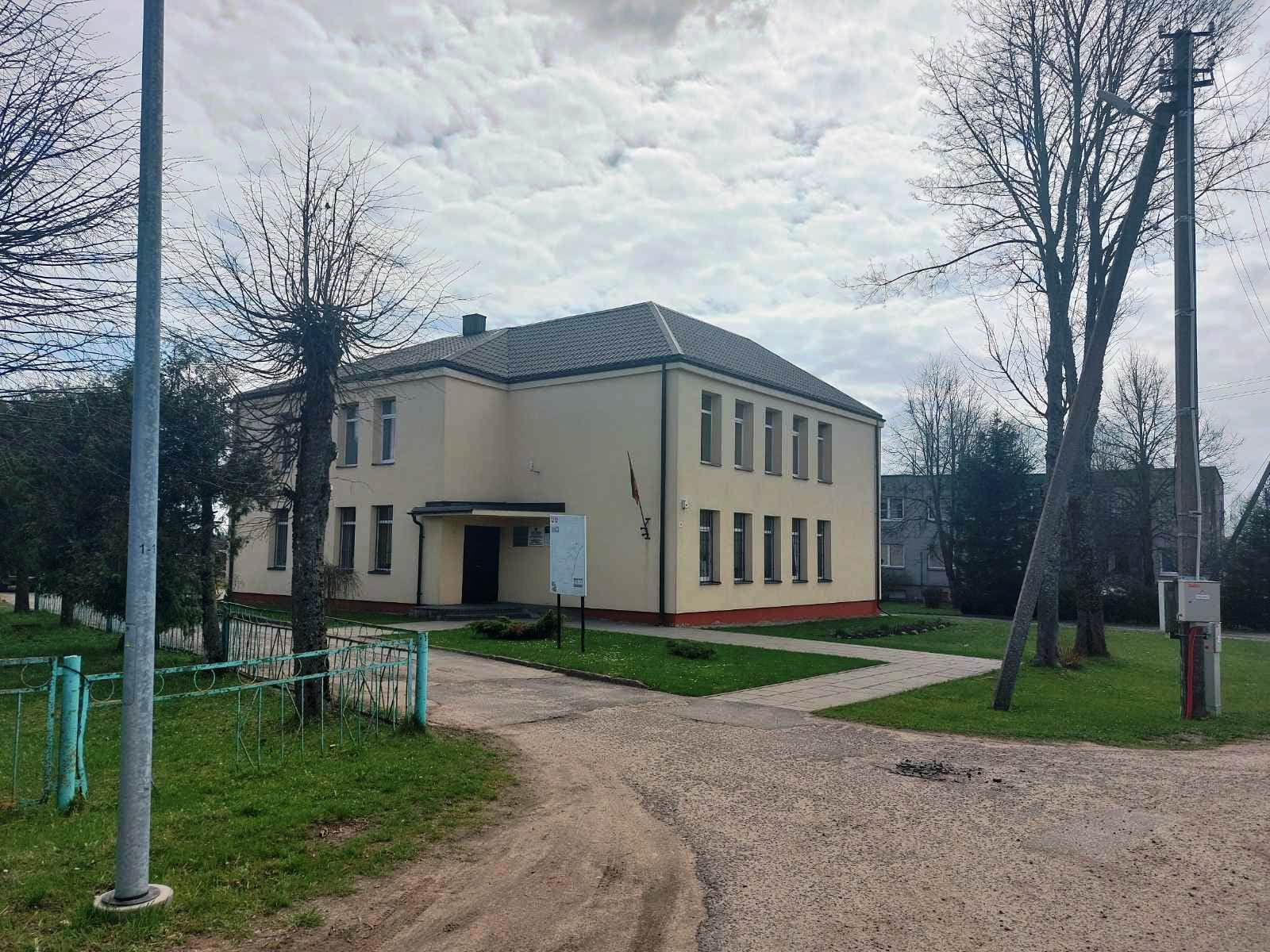
eldership office

Within the administrative structure of the country Medininkai is the centre of the Medininkai Eldership; it is one of 23 third-level units which form the Vilnius Area County, which in turn as one of 8 second-level units forms the Vilnius Region, one of 10 first-level administration units in Lithuania. According to the number of inhabitants recorded in 2011 (1,374), the eldership is among the least populated ones in the country and ranks 439. in Lithuania. According to territory (62.9 km^{2}) it is also one of smallest ones and ranks 404. in Lithuania. According to population density (22 persons per km^{2}) the eldership ranks approximately mid-table at position 255. Of the total eldersip surface some 50 km^{2} is cultivated agricultural area, 10.8 km^{2} is forest, and the rest is settlements, barren land and water (mostly small lakes and ponds). The eldership falls into 5 sub-elderships (lit. seniūnaitija), 4-level smallest admin units

According to the 2011 census there were 37 settlements in the eldership. Medininkai was inhabited by 580 people; other largest settlements were Podwarańce/Padvarionys (114), Łabiszki/Laibiškės (72), Kurhany/Pilkapiai (68) and Kosinka/Kuosinė (62), though borders between them are vague (e.g. the closest buildings in Medininkai and Pilkapiai are separated by some 500 metres). Both the Medininkai eldership and the Medininkai village are subject to ongoing population decline; since the fall of the USSR the number of villagers fell by 30%, and in 2021-2022 the eldership lost 43 people. Among the eldership population (no data for Medininkai separately) 63% are aged 18–65 (860 people), 21% are minors (284), and 17% are the retired (230). The eldership recorded the second lowest share of minors and the third highest share of retirees in the county. Medininkai is also one of the elderships with the lowest proportion of males vs females, the phenomenon typical for rural regions. Like in most elderships south-east of Vilnius, most of the population according to the 2011 census were Poles (79.6%). Largest national minorities are Belarusians (7.3%), Lithuanians (6.5%) and Russians (5.2%).

=== Economy ===
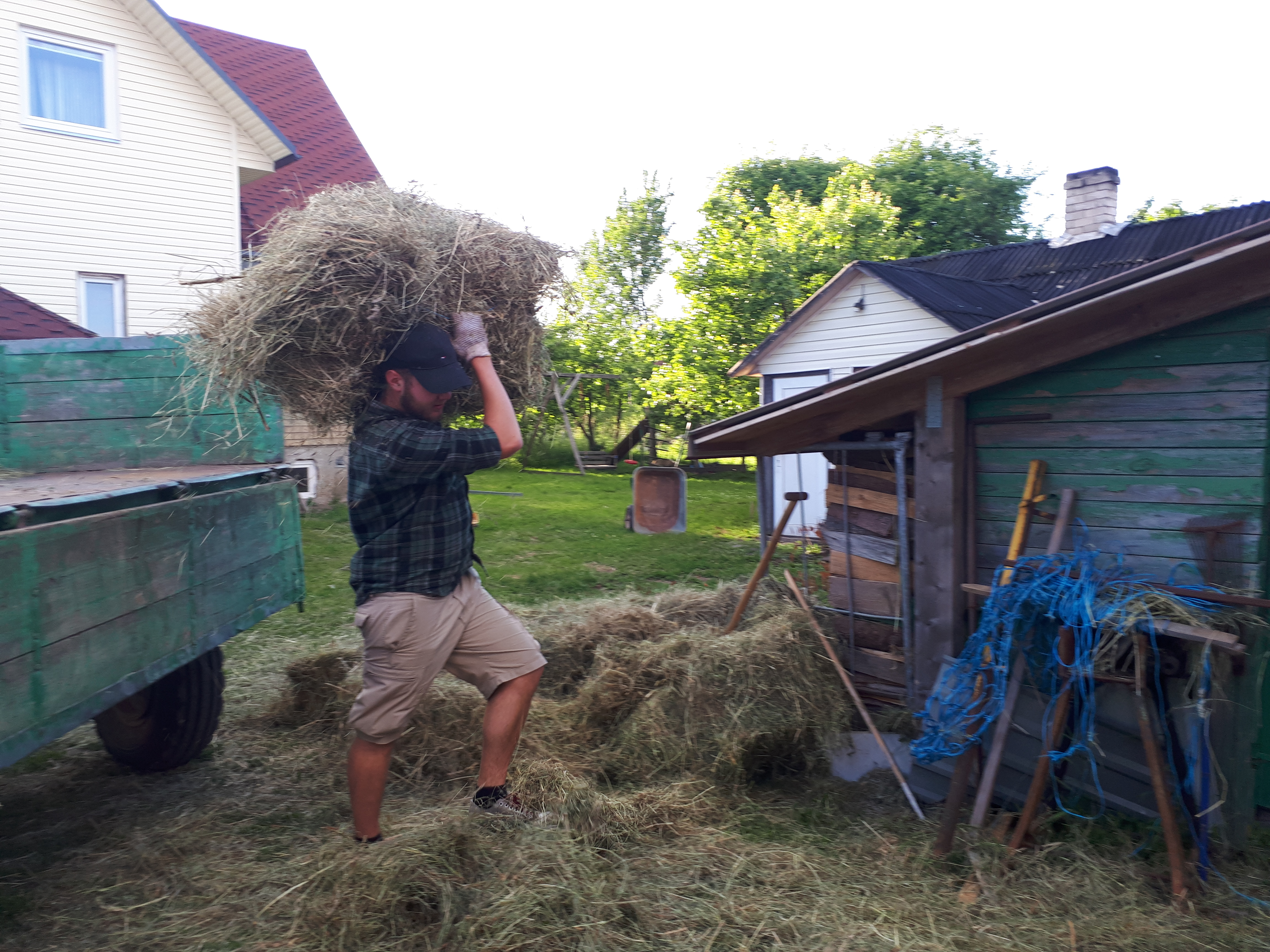
storing hay, Medininkai

Until the early 21st century most Medininkai villagers lived either exclusively or mostly off agriculture. Today there are still many households depending upon agrarian jobs, usually related to cereal and forage type of cultivation. Animal husbandry is in decline, and a cow or a horse on Medininkai pastures is becoming sort of a rarity. Many households still keep small gardens, orchards or cultivated plots, but usually for own consumption and only with minor or no part of the production intended for sale; the same applies to poultry and pigs. Single enterprises rely on activities which target the Vilnius consumer market, e.g. cultivating and trading in flowers.

For few decades the most dynamic Medininkai business is a variety of services related to long-distance road haulage. Trumtransa is a Medininkai-based company which runs consignement stocks, warehouses, workshops, sale of spare parts, renting semitrailers, brokerage and customs-related service. However, its core activity is road transport, mostly between the Baltic states and Belarus and/or Russia. A similar Medininkai company, Hegvita Agro, apart from activities listed also leases buses and specialised heavy equipment (snow ploughs, bulldozers, loaders, dump trucks) and offers services related to its operations. Highly diversified fleet of both companies ranges from mini-vans to road trains. Some companies like Durga are based elsewhere but they operate their offices in Medininkai, e.g. those which offer border-related services.

There are few rural retail trade outlets in Medininkai; their number differs depending upon business conditions, usually ranging from 2 to 3. Some services, e.g. barbers, operate bordering the grey economy or as neighbourhood mutual assistance. Some people take advantage of the nearby Lithuanian-Belarus border crossing and offer services related, like sale of insurance, highway vignettes, currency exchange etc. State employers are the local eldership office, the school and the kindergarten. A sizeable group of villagers, especially the young ones, commute to Vilnius and work there.

=== Official infrastructure ===
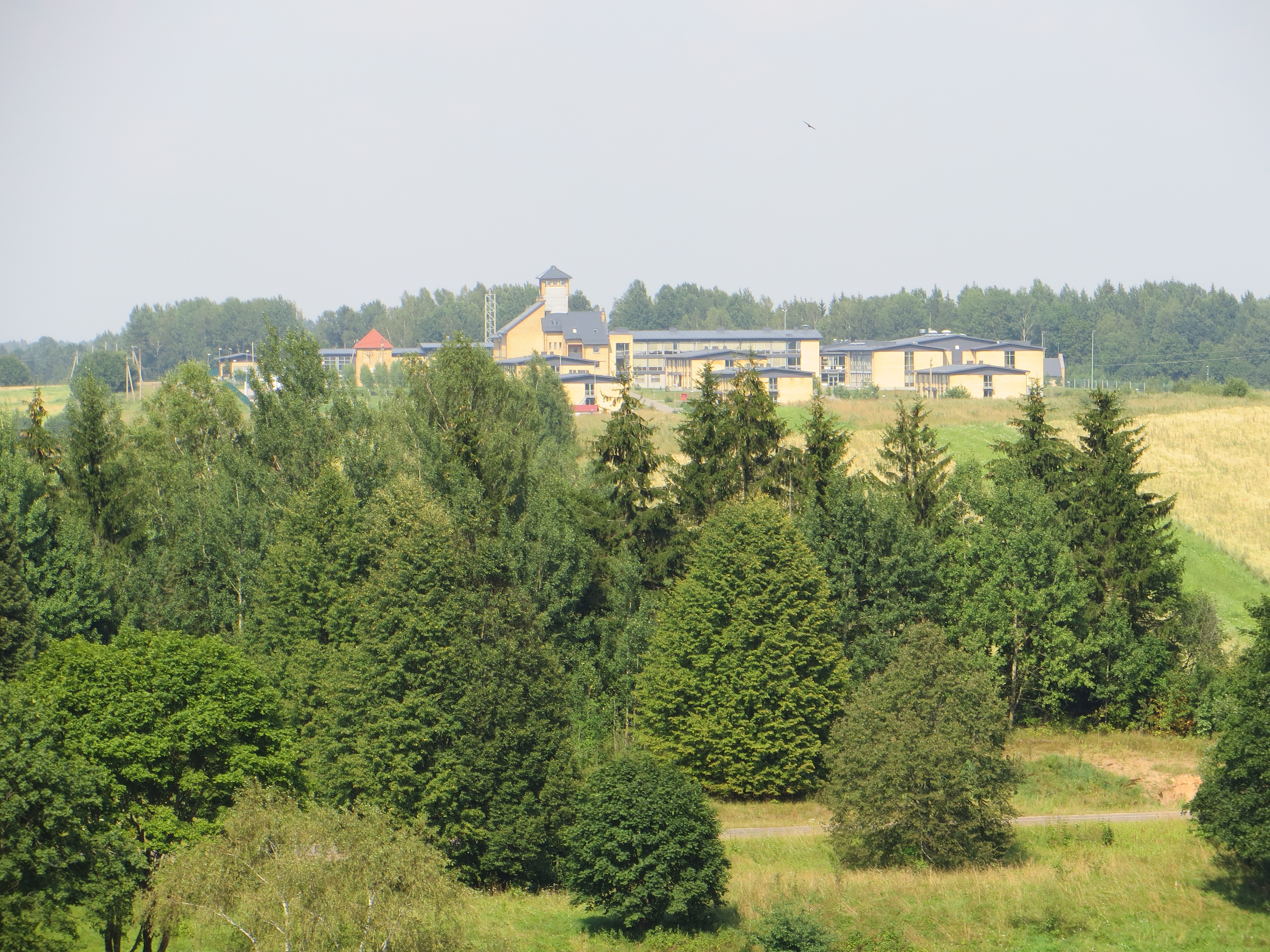
border guards school

Formally the key point of the official infrastructure is the eldership office, which hosts also scaled-down post services. The eldership is responsible for the Secondary School of St. Casimir. There were 15 teachers on the payroll in the schooling year of 2022/2023; on its website the school provides no information as to the number of class groups or students. The number of teenagers who completed the curriculum keeps falling; there were 40-50 graduates annually in the 1980s, but since the 1990s the figure is around 10. The language of instruction is Polish. Another facility of the educational infrastructure is the kindergarten. The eldership maintains a network of streets in the village; in the early 2020s there were 12 of them. It is also responsible for maintenance of 46.2 km local roads; 42 km of them are categorized as “hardened”. Some criticise the eldership for alleged lack of investment in cycling paths.

The eldership is not responsible for the A3 highway, running some 2 km away from the village centre; it is categorized as major road (magistralinis kelias) and forms part of the European E28 transport corridor, running from Berlin to Minsk. There are 3 state roads in Medininkai; 5358 runs north to Szumsk/Šumskas, 5213 runs south to Turgiele/Turgeliai, and 5258 runs west to Rukojnie/Rukainiai (its 2-km-long eastern sector ends at the Belarus frontier). There is no railway line in the eldership. On the distance of some 9 km the eastern border of the eldersip overlaps the state frontier between Lithuania and Belarus. The key state investment in Medininkai is the border guards school (Medininkų pasieniečių mokykla), previously located in Wisaginia/Visaginas. Following some 2 years of construction work, it was opened in 2007. The compound is located somewhat away from the village and consists of some 10 large buildings; students are hosted in barracks. Graduation is equal to obtaining a university diploma.

=== Politics ===
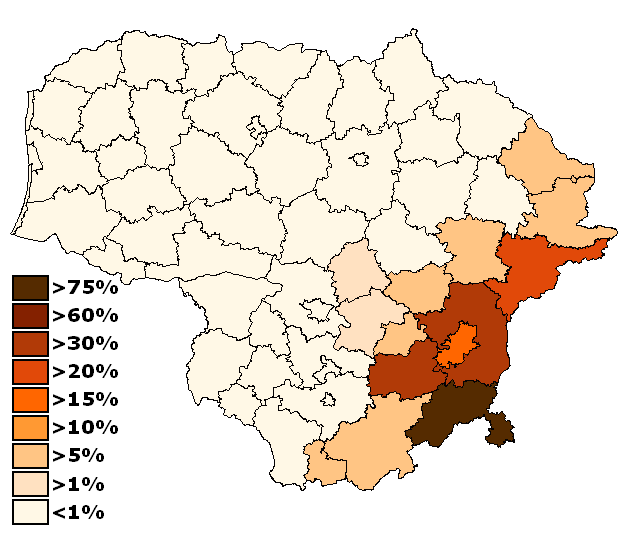
Poles in Lithuania

The key organisation active in Medininkai is Union of Poles in Lithuania (ZPL). Political life in the eldership has been for decades dominated by its political emanation, Electoral Action of Poles in Lithuania (AWPL), which keeps winning subsequent local elections. In the 2023 Lithuanian local elections in the Medininkai electoral district AWPL gathered 79% of all votes cast and it was the third best result of the party in the Vilnius County. Local ZPL and AWPL branches focus on raising living standards and maintaining the Polish identity of the population. However, efforts of local Polish councilors did not result in bi-lingual, Lithuanian and Polish placename signs, though there were efforts to bring the matter before the EU bodies. The ratio of Poles in the village is slowly but steadily decreasing. At times nationalist Lithuanian groupings and personalities advance threads, supposed to demonstrate Lithuanian character of the region.

In the late 2010s there was much anxiety in Lithuania, and in particular in regions bordering Belarus, related to construction of the Astravets Nuclear Power Plant, located 20 km away from Medininkai. Despite protests of the Lithuanian government the plant has been opened and remains operational. Another Lithuanian-Belarusian controversy turned out to be the migrant issue. Since the summer of 2021 the Belarus authorities launched the campaign of transferring Asian and African migrants across western borders of the country, to Poland and Lithuania. In order to accommodate migrants detained by Lithuanian border guards in the fall of 2021 the Vilnius government built a temporary site, named Foreigners Registration Centre. During the peak period it housed some 900 migrants. Soon media, including foreign news agencies, started to report discrimination of LGBT persons and sexual exploitation of women by Lithuanian servicemen, and Medininkai attracted attention of the EU representatives. Following media criticism in the fall of 2022 the migrants were moved to centres elsewhere and the Medininkai camp was dismantled. Some military plans envision Medininkai to be headquarters of one of rotating brigades from the Polish 12. Mechanised Division, as part of NATO troops supposed to flank would-be Russian advance corridor from Belarus to Poland.

=== Culture ===
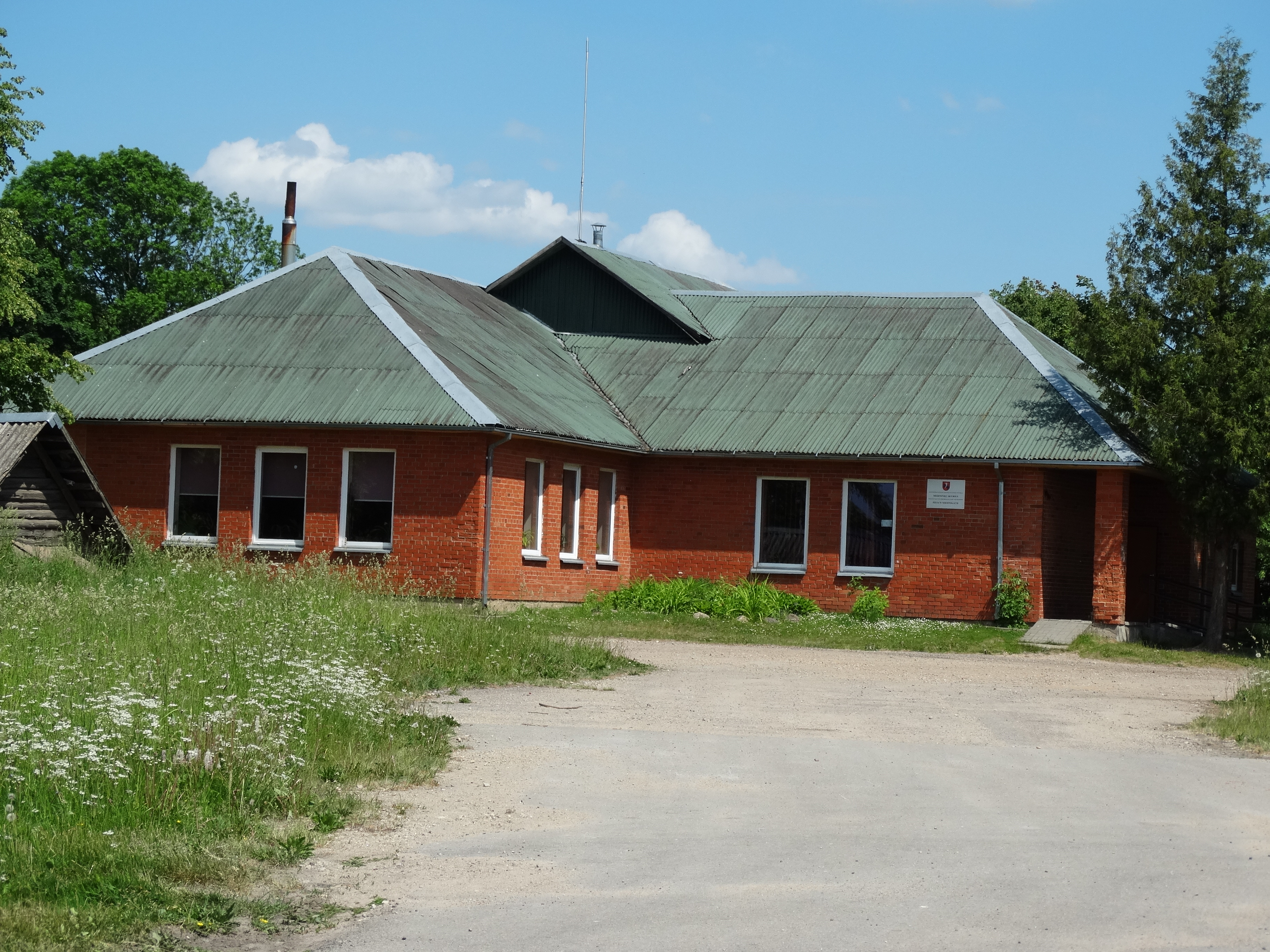
House of Culture, Medininkai

Theoretically the key cultural outpost in Medininkai is the local House of Culture, constructed already during the Soviet era. In the early 21st century its manager was Katažina Zvonkuvienė, later a dancer, singer and a Lithuanian show-business celebrity; recently the facility is mostly closed. Presently there are 4 local institutions which contribute to cultural life in the village: the local branch of Trakai Historical Museum (Trakų istorijos muziejus), the St. Casimir school, the Roman Catholic parish and the local branch of ZPL.

The museum focuses on organizing various types of events in the castle; they usually combine some popular education threads, related to its history, and entertainment. They might embrace historical reenactments, concertos, sport competitions, lectures, plays, workshops etc. In case of good weather they attract hundreds of visitors, including many travelling from Vilnius.

Students from the St. Casimir School since 2007 have been issuing a local bulletin, named Echo. The school is housing so-called Museum of Local History, founded by a teacher Aleksander Olenkowicz; it is dedicated to Medininkai and its environs. There is also a Memory Room, which presents the history of the institution, a library and a local folk group, which used to perform also beyond Lithuania.

One of statutory ZPL activities is contributing to Polish culture in Lithuania. Its Medininkai branch is co-organising various competitions for children and teenagers, sight-seeing tours across Lithuania, journeys in footsteps of Polish history in Vilnius and elsewhere, and excursions to Poland, including taking part in nationwide events like Narodowy Dzień Pamięci Żołnierzy Wyklętych. ZPL is also supporting sports activities and co-financing the annual harvest festival.

Sort of cultural activity is carried out by the Medininkai parish and the Franciscan monastery. It is calibrated along religious lines and related to the liturgical timeline, including lectures preceding the Lent, Christmas concertos or events accompanying Corpus Christi. The Medininkai monastery is also co-organizing meditations and debates in the Franciscan Spiritual Centre in Vilnius.

=== Religion ===
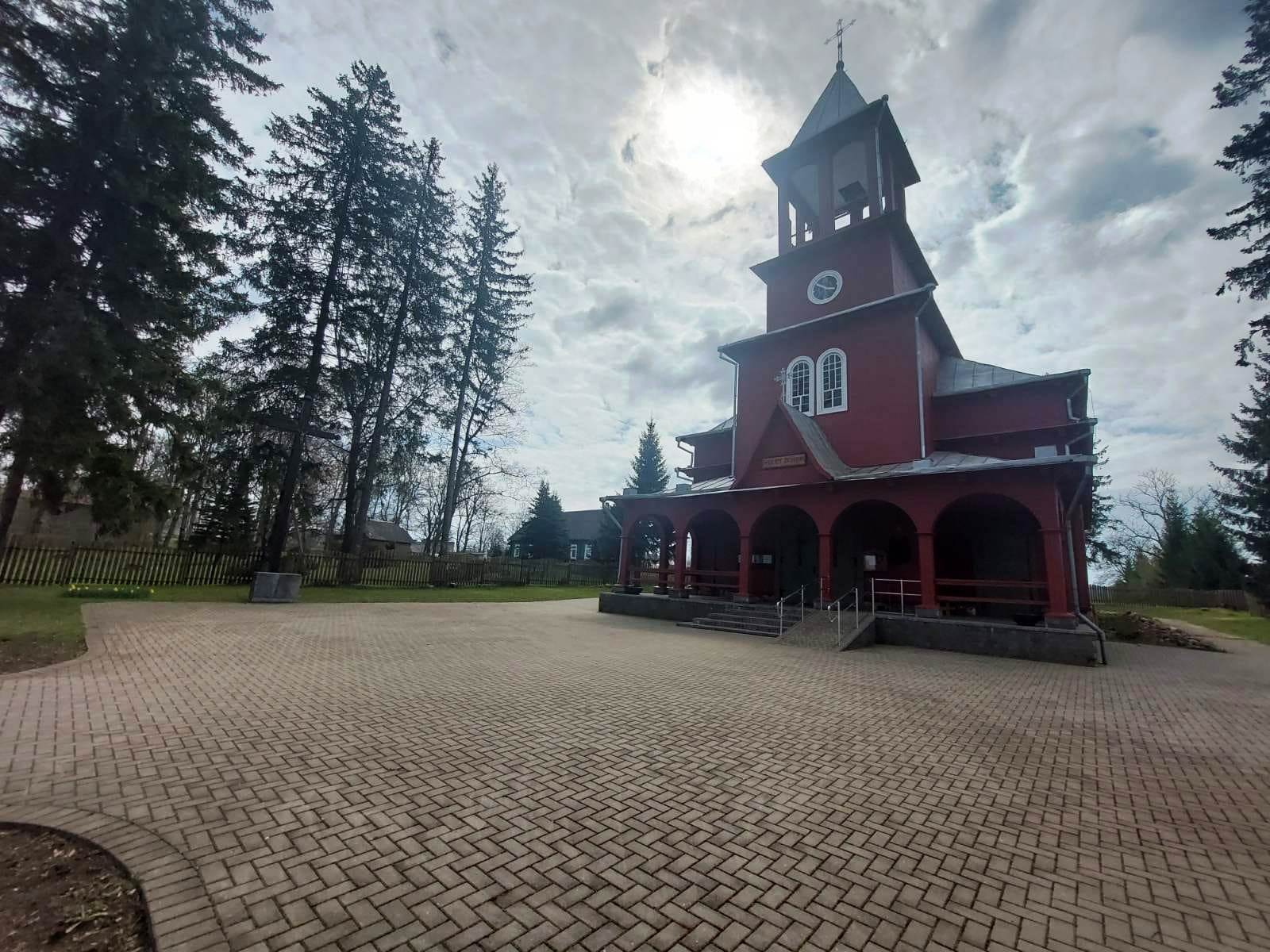
church in Medininkai

Medininkai is the centre of the Holy Trinity and St. Casimir parish, organized around the 1929-built church. In case the 1916-erected parish is considered continuation of the 1832-abolished parish, it is now over 600-year old and counts among the oldest ones on the territory of the former Grand Duchy of Lithuania. The parish forms part of the Naujosios Vilnios decanate, which in turns is part of the Vilnius archdiocese. On working days the service is held once, on Sundays and religious holidays three times a day. Religious service is only in Polish. The villagers remain fairly religious; the annual pastoral visit, which takes place around Christmas, is admitted by 70-80% of households. The most important day in a year, the Harvest Festival, is partially a religious event, strongly marked by the Catholic spirit.

Religious service in the parish is held by the Franciscans from the 1994-established Medininkai monastery. Since then there have been 7 guardians, who in parallel headed the parish; until 2020 they appeared as pastoral administrators, later as a parish priests. In 2023 this role was performed by Józef Makarczyk, the guardian but also a scientist and scholar in history of the Church, especially in the Grand Duchy. The Medininkai monastery is very compact; in the 21st century there have been usually no more than 5 friars hosted at the premises. At the turn of the centuries it was the centre of Franciscan rebirth in Lithuania; currently it is one of 3 Franciscan monasteries in the country. The parish and the monastery take care of the cemetery, located near the plot where the old, pre-1834 church used to stand. The oldest existing graves come from the 1860s; it is still where the defunct villagers are laid to rest. There are few private cemeteries on the parish territory (Czapuniszki, Gudzie, Koleśniki, Kule, Małyniszki, Tumasy, Żemły); last burials took place there in the 1960s.

=== Tourist attractions ===
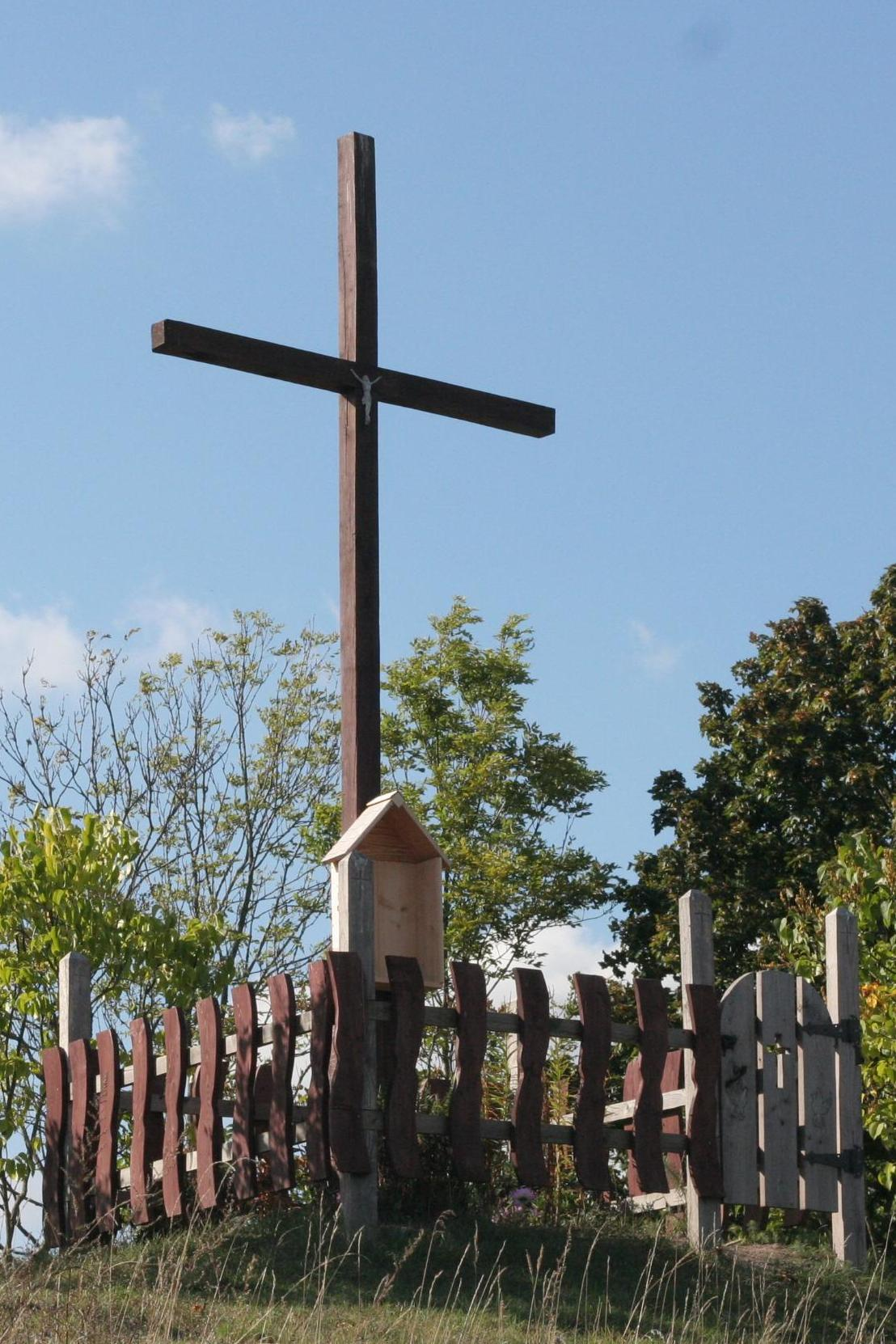
Juozapinė summit

One of two major tourist attractions of Medininkai is the castle. Since regaining independence it has become a piece of the politically loaded national historiographic narrative, supposed to demonstrate the ancient grandeur of Lithuania and glory of the Lithuanian nation. Hence, in the 21st century it was subject to far-reaching works going far beyond conservation of the ruins; on basis of historian's idea of the original construction the decayed walls were subject to major overhaul. They were heightened, reinforced and leveled; a tower, supposed to be the reconstruction of the original, has been constructed in the north-eastern corner. Its lower floors currently host an exposition; apart from models and drawings it contains artefacts from the medieval history of Lithuania. As a result, an opened dilapidating ruin became a closed museum, subject to entry fee. The castle periodically is location to theme festivals, related to medieval history of Lithuania.

Another magnet attracting tourists to Medninkai is a hill, declared the highest natural point in the country. Until the early 21st century it was believed that it is located at Juozapinė Hill, a culmination some 1.5 km from the castle. Traditionally it hosted a rural cross with the pictore of Our Madonna from Ostra Brama; in the 1990s the authorities mounted atop also a large boulder with inscription honoring Mendogas the king and a wooden totem, styled after the old pagan symbols. For some time the objects were subject to controversy; unknown perpetrators used to vandalise the place, e.g. by pouring paint on the rock. New measurement works of 2004 revealed that the actual height of Juozapinė Hill is lower than believed (292.7 instead of 293.6 metres); the highest point was found to be a nameless hill located some 500 metres south; it was named Aukštojas Hill and declared to be 293.8 metres high. A stone circle-shaped ring referring to monarchic Lithuanian mythology has been mounted on top of it; also, an observation tower has been constructed; the entrance is free.

== Notable people ==
- Francišak Bahuševič (1840-1900), Belarusian author and lawyer, born in Świrany near Medininkai
- Józef Łukaszewicz (1863-1928), Polish conspirator, physicist and geographer, born in Bykówka near Medininkai
- Medard Czobot (1928-2000), Polish doctor and activist, born in Medininkai
- lt:Katažina Zvonkuvienė (b. 1980), Polish-Lithuanian singer and media celebrity, born in Medininkai

== See also ==
- Medininkai Castle
- Soviet OMON assaults on Lithuanian border posts
