= Kruopinė Hill =

Hill in Lithuania

Coordinates: 54°32′N 25°29′E

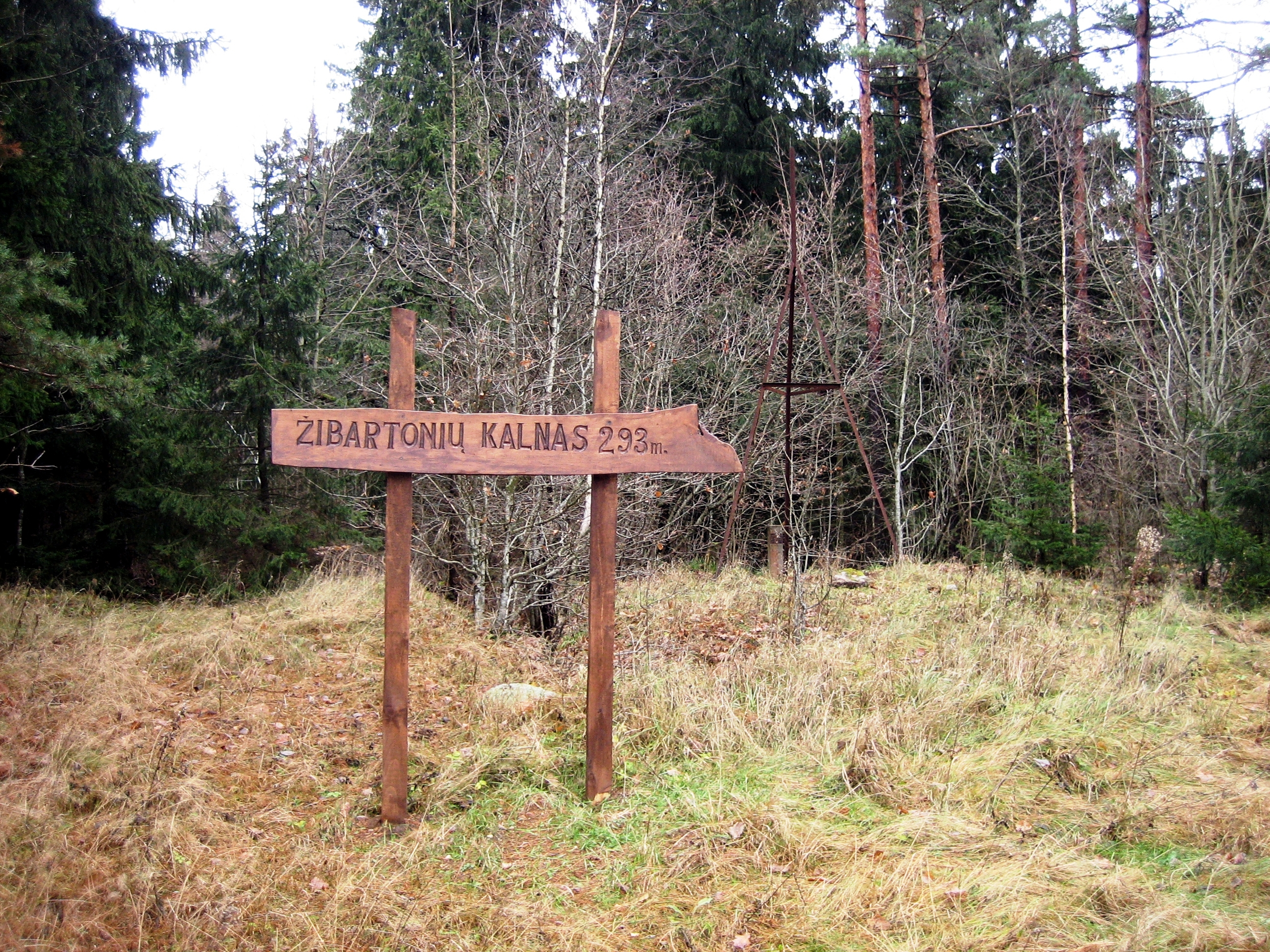
Sign at the peak of the hill

Kruopinė (Žybartonys) Hill is a hill near Vilnius which is the second-highest point in Lithuania. Its elevation is 293.65 metres.

It was formerly believed to be highest point in Lithuania. However, in 2007 the peaks were remeasured by staff at Vilnius Gediminas Technical University, using GPS technology. The status of highest elevation in Lithuania is now considered to be Aukštojas Hill, at 293.84 metres, approximately 10 km away.

== See also ==
- Aukštojas Hill, the actual highest point in Lithuania
- Juozapinė Hill, also formerly stated to be the highest point
