= Aukštojas Hill =

Hill in Lithuania

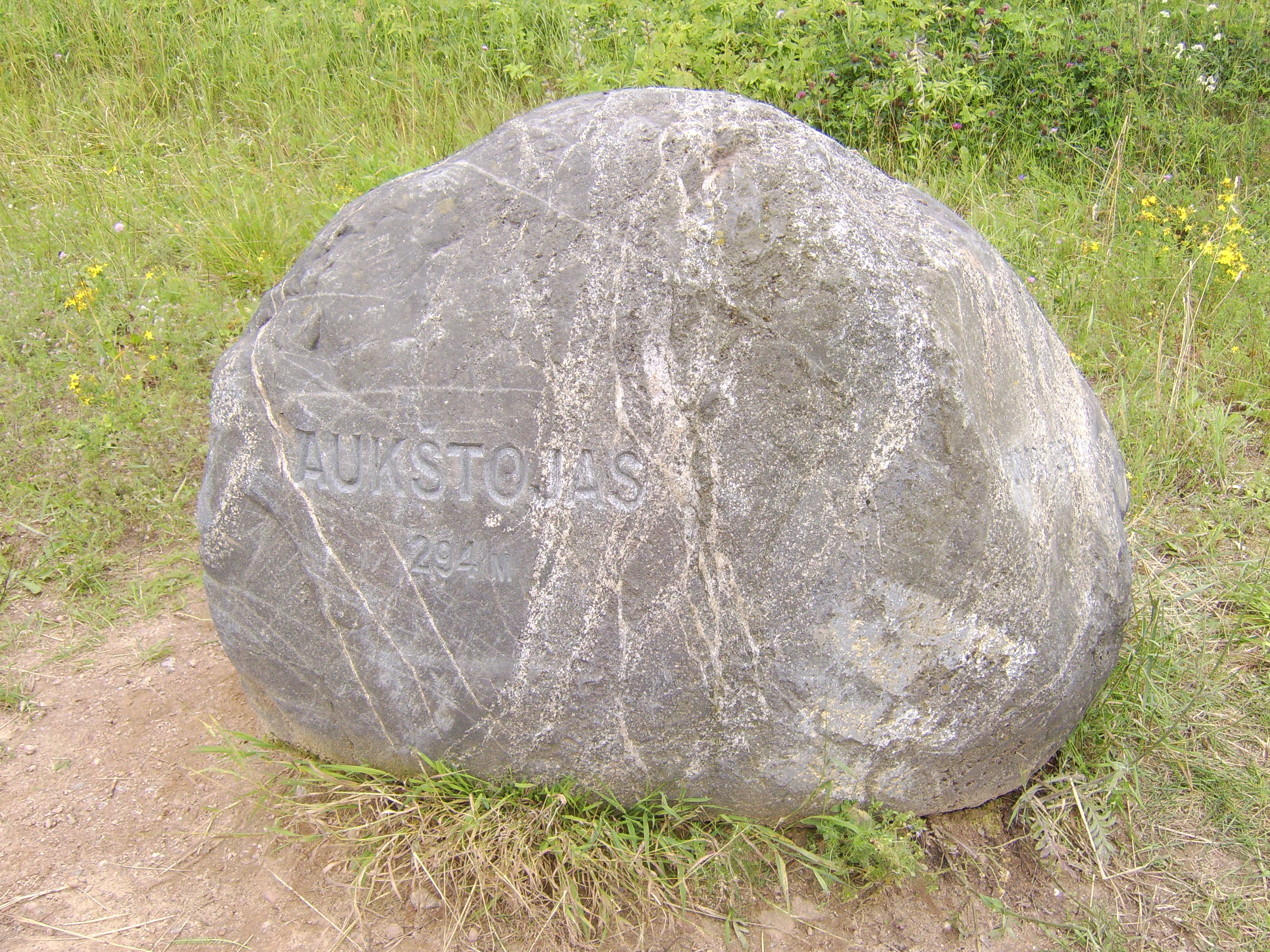
- Stone on summit inscribed with revised elevation of 294 m.

Highest point
- Elevation: 293.84 m (964.0 ft)
- Listing: Country high point
- Coordinates: 54°31′37.5″N 25°37′33.8″E

Geography
- Location within Lithuania
- Location: Medininkai, Lithuania
- Parent range: Medininkai Highlands

Geology
- Mountain type: Hill

Aukštojas Hill is the highest point of Lithuania. It is located in the Medininkai Highlands, Migūnai forestry, approximately 24 kilometres (15 mi) southeast of the capital city of Vilnius. Its elevation was measured in 2004 at 293.84 metres (964.0 feet) by specialists at the Institute of Geodesy at Vilnius Gediminas Technical University, using GPS technology. Previously, Juozapinė Hill, at 292.7 metres (960 feet), had been considered as the highest point in Lithuania. Aukštojas and Juozapinė are located approximately 500 metres (1,600 feet) from one another.

The designated use of the land where Aukštojas Hill is situated has been changed by the Vilnius county governor from agricultural to tourism and cultural. The summit of the hill features a grove of pine trees, characteristic of the Medininkai region as whole.

The name "Aukštojas" was suggested by Libertas Klimka, a professor of history at the Vilnius Pedagogical University, and was the winner of a contest to decide the best name for the newly discovered elevation. Aukštėjas (Aukštojas, Aukštujis) was one of the epithets for the supreme deity, Dievas, in ancient Lithuanian mythology; he was considered the creator of the world. The hill was 'baptised' on June 20, 2005, during an unofficial ceremony. The name was officially approved by the Vilnius Region Municipality Council on November 18, 2005.

An alternate name, 'Aukštėjas Hill', was discarded as a nominee by the State Commission on the Lithuanian language, on the grounds that its suffix ("-ėj-") was not standard usage for a place-name.

== See also ==
- Kruopinė Hill, also formerly stated to be the highest point
