= Medininkai Castle =

Medieval castle in eastern Lithuania

- Medininkų pilis (Lithuanian)
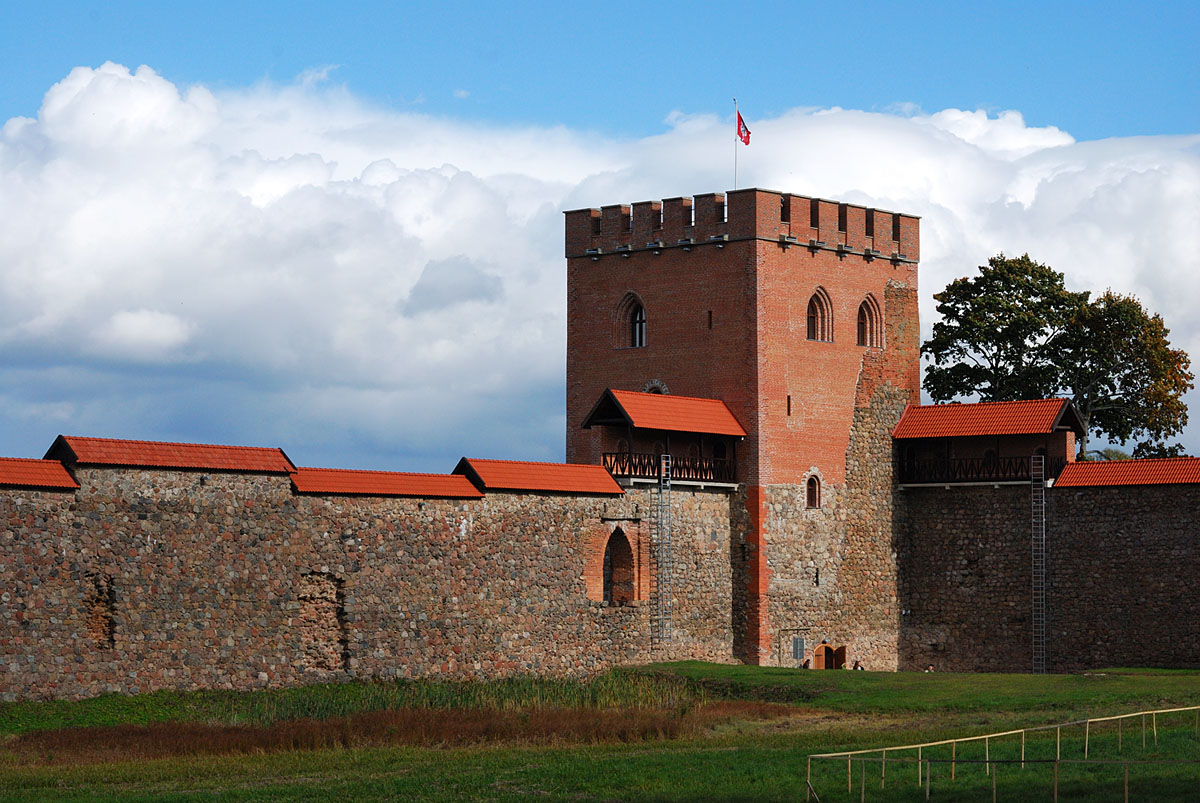
- Restored tower of the castle

- Location within Lithuania
- Interactive map of Medininkai Castle
- 54°32′20″N 25°39′00″E
- Type: Castle
- Location: Medininkai, Lithuania

History
- Built: 14th century
- Built for: Grand Duke of Lithuania Algirdas

Site notes
- Architectural style: Brick Gothic
- Restored: 1961-present
- Owner: Trakai History Museum

Cultural Monuments of Lithuania
- Type: National
- Designated: 12 June 1998
- Reference no.: 1030

Medininkai Castle (Lithuanian: Medininkų pilis), a medieval castle in Vilnius district, eastern Lithuania. Castle was built in the first half of the 14th century. The defensive perimeter of the castle was 6.5 ha; it is the largest enclosure type castle in Lithuania, and one of the largest castles in Central and North-Eastern Europe.

== Architecture ==
It was built on plain ground and was designed for flank defence. The rectangular castle's yard covered approximately 1.8 hectares and was protected by walls 15 metres high and 2 metres thick. The castle had 4 gates and towers. The main tower (donjon), about 30 metres high, was used for residential quarters. The walls and towers of the shell structure are made of field stones and bricks in the Baltic brick bonding method. The castle's structure is similar to that of the castles of Lida, Kreva and Kaunas.

== History ==
Castle walls and tower drawn in the 19th century by Napoleon Orda

The origins of Medininkai Castle date back to 1311 as mentioned in the Chronicon terrae Prussiae chronicle. It is likely that the castle was originally built from timber and was adapted for frontal defence. The current brick and stone castle was built in the late 14th century likely by the Grand Duke Algirdas, during this period, the castle served as a refuge for the local population during attacks by the Tatars and the Teutonic Knights. However, it was later besieged and burnt down by the forces of the Teutonic Knights, together with the future Grand Duke of Lithuania Švitrigaila in 1402, following which it fell into disuse as a defensive structure, although Grand Duke Vytautas the Great did not abandon the castle outright and later visited it several times. The castle was used as the summer residence of the Grand Duke of Lithuania and the King of Poland, Casimir IV Jagiellon. The children of the monarch and their tutor, Jan Dlugosz, often visited Medininkai as well.

From the late 15th century onwards, the castle was gradually abandoned following a series of fires, the most significant of which occurred in the early 16th century. Because of the increased use of firearms, this type of castle was no longer suited for defensive purposes and was later used as a residential castle. During the 17th–18th centuries it was reorganized into a farm and a bakery. The wooden structures that comprised the Medininkai Manor were relocated to the castle courtyard, where they remained until the early 20th century. In 1665 the castle was captured by Swedish Army during the Swedish Deluge of Polish-Lithuanian Commonwealth. In 1812, Medininkai Castle was occupied by the Grande Armée retreating from Moscow, during the failed French invasion of Russia. The wooden buildings were demolished and burned in the winter to provide warmth for the French troops.

The Medniki estate passed into the hands of the Goštautas family in the sixteenth century, and later to the Ogiński family. It changed owners several times thereafter, eventually becoming the property of the Drohojowski family in the nineteenth century. In July 1944, the Soviets held approximately 6,000 soldiers within the castle grounds after they had been captured following the joint liberation of Vilnius from German occupation.

== Restoration ==
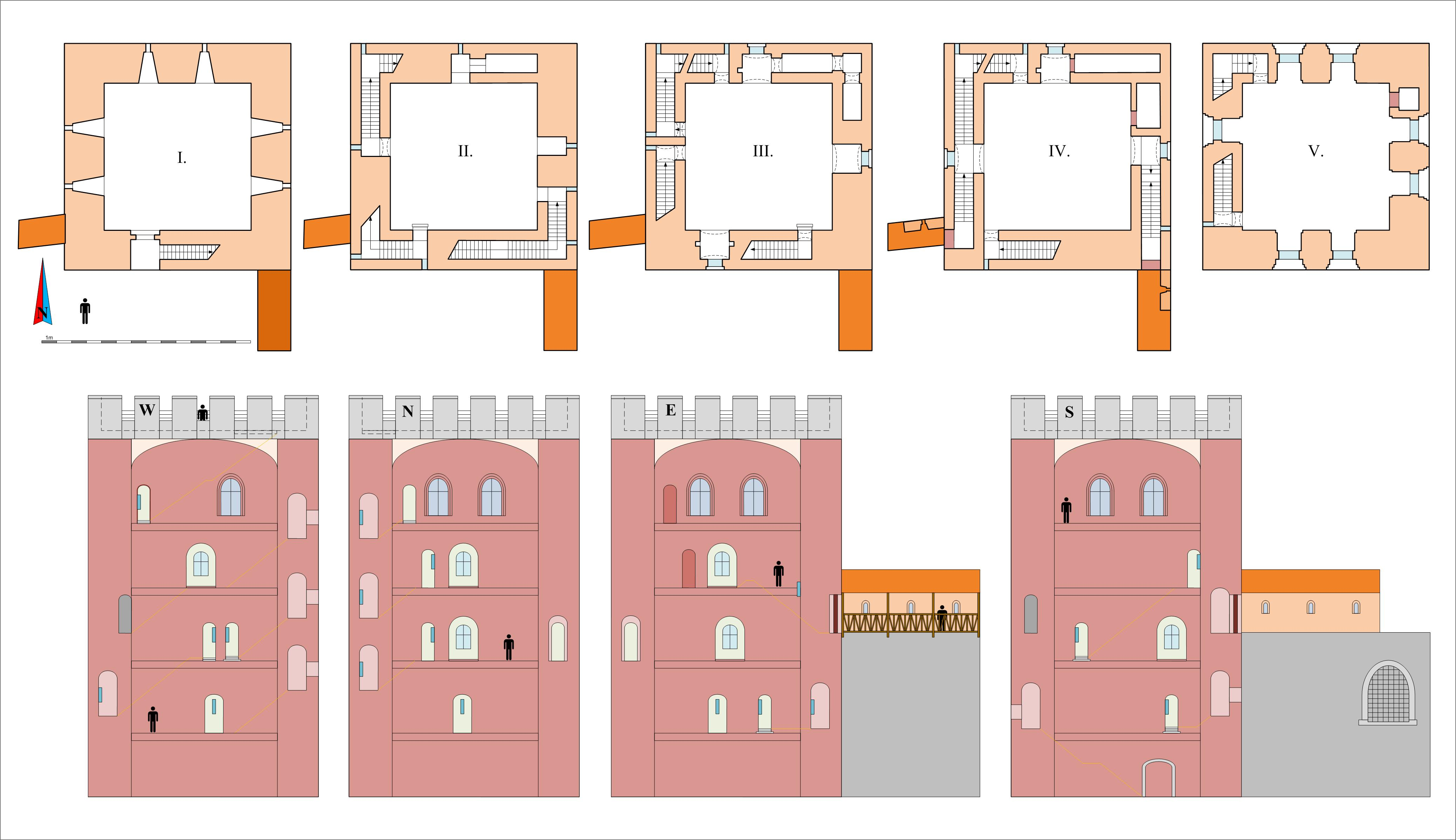
Plan of Medininkai castle northeastern tower

In the middle of the 20th century, the architect Sigitas Benjaminas Lasavickas and the archaeologist Karolis Mekas investigated the castle. Between 1961 and 1963, the castle underwent conservation, with the openings of the three gates being restored. Between 1970 and 1973, the western wall was subject to conservation and restoration works as part of a project overseen by architect Evaldas Purlys. In 1979, further restoration work was undertaken on the brickwork of the outer walls. During this period, the castle, recognised as an architectural and archaeological monument, was under the administration of the National Museum of Lithuania. In 1974, the castle was utilised as an exhibition space to showcase the historical development of Medininkai Castle. In 1992, the initiative to restore the castle was launched by the Department of Cultural Heritage and the Foundation of Lithuanian Culture. Between 1994 and 2000, the castle's donjon underwent reconstruction, the defensive walls were restored, part of the 13th-century brickwork was restored, and the walls were covered with protective tiled canopies. The reconstruction of the donjon was supported by the Lithuanian-American Society of Engineering Architects (PLIAS). After the castle's restoration, its museum currently exhibits large collection of items made from silver by artisans of the Grand Duchy of Lithuania, and collection of hunting trophies and hunting knives of President Algirdas Brazauskas.

== Gallery ==
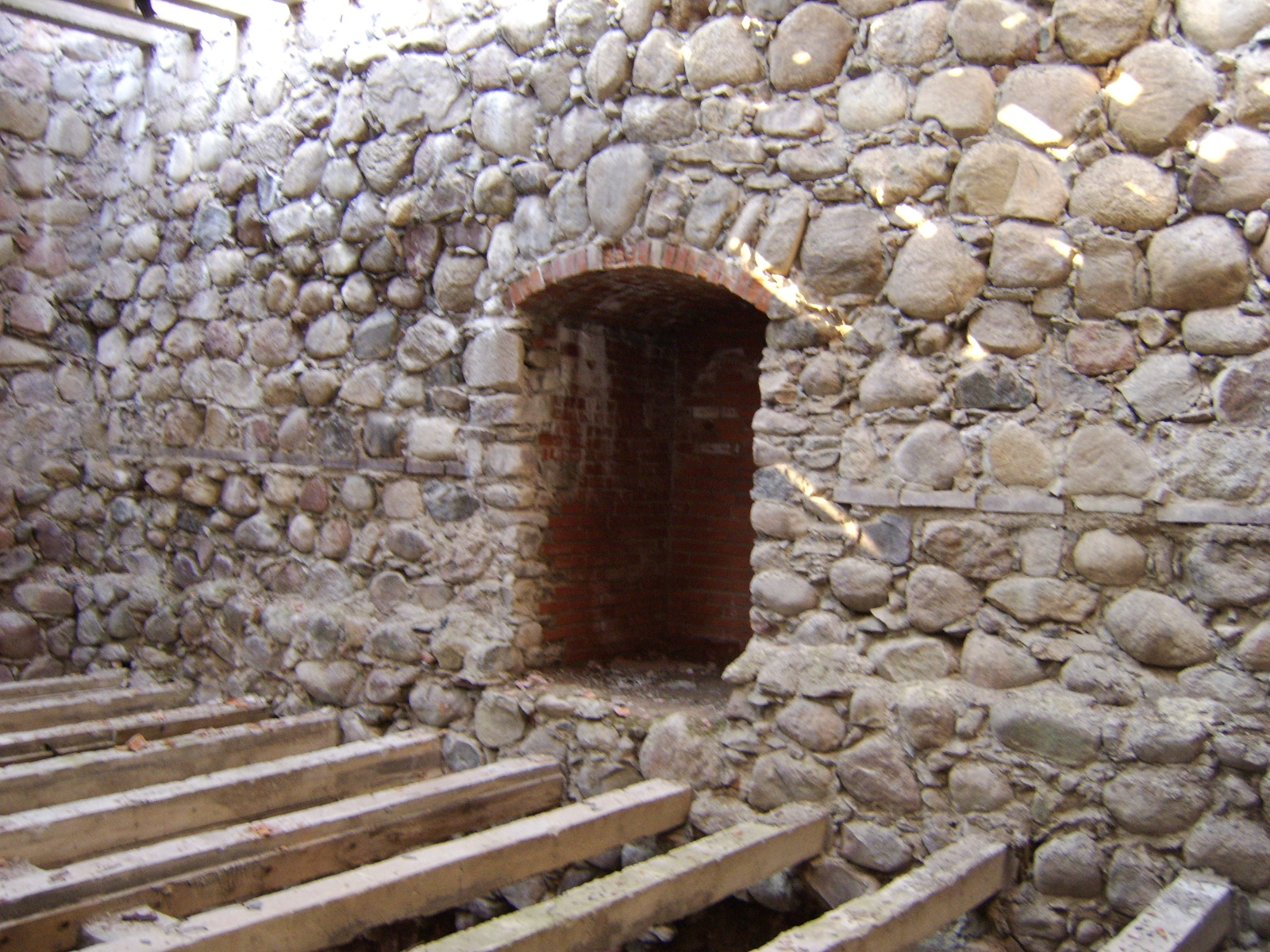
Inside of the keep

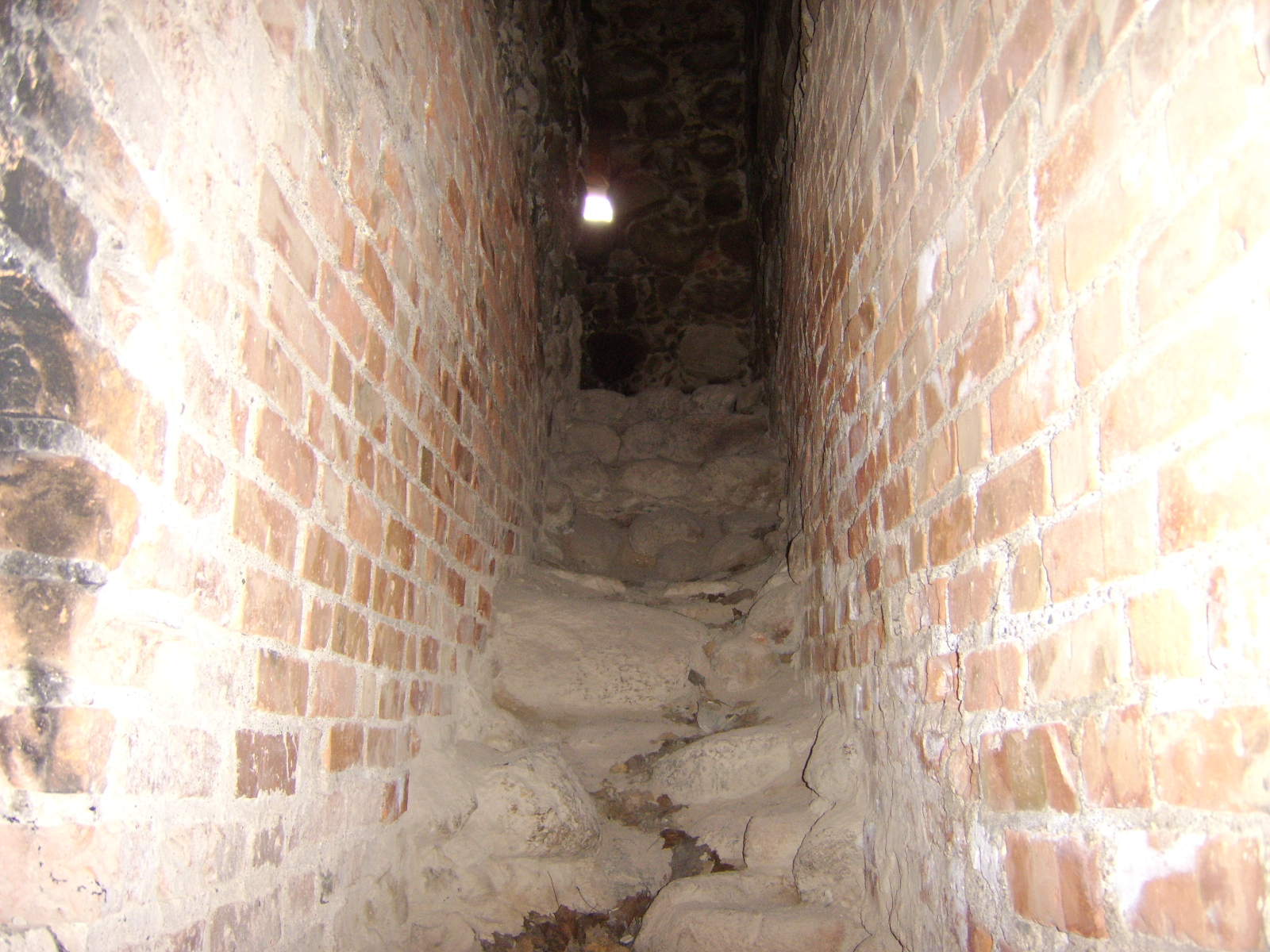
Entrance into the keep

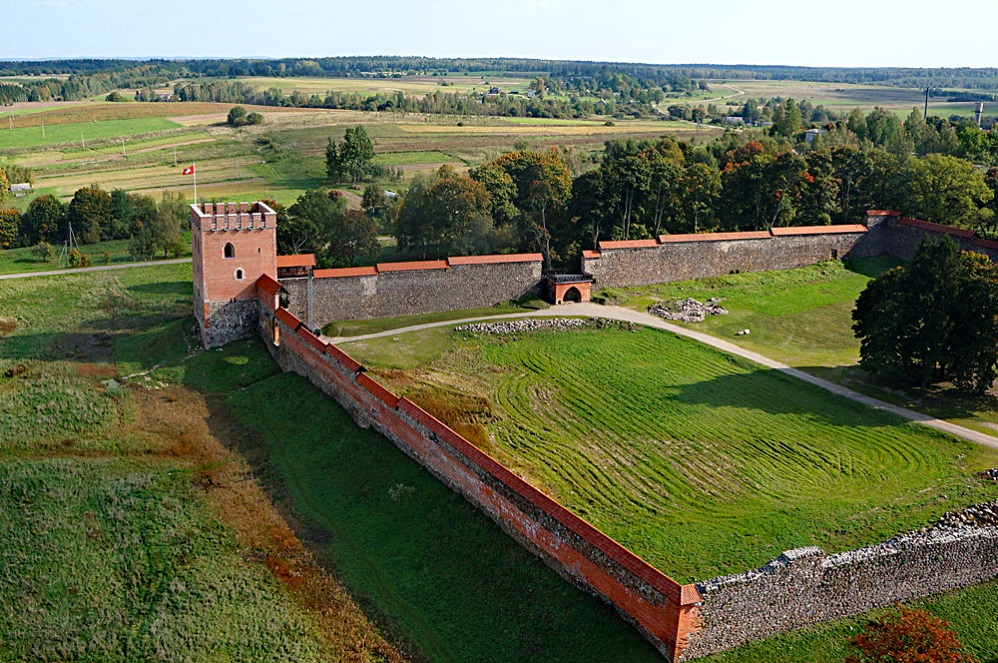
Aerial view of the castle

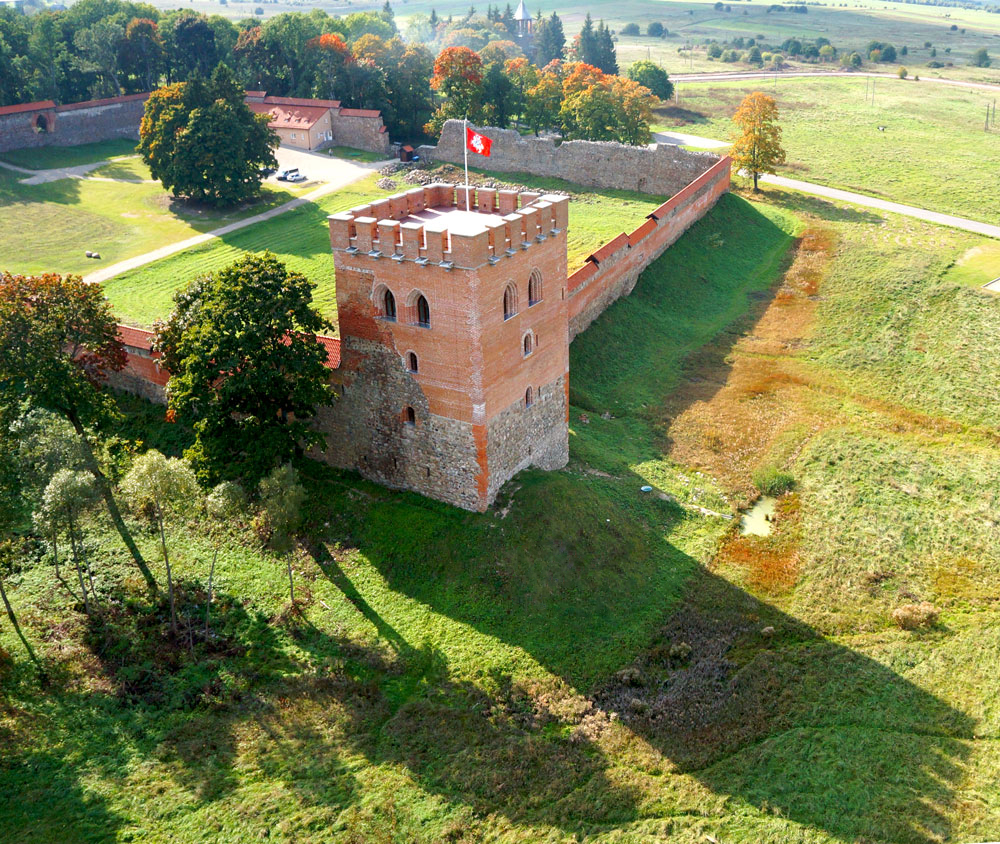
Aerial view of the main tower

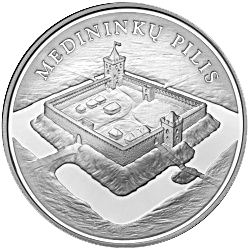
Litas commemorative coin dedicated to the Medininkai Castle

== See also ==
- Castles in Lithuania

== Bibliography ==
- Rąkowski, Grzegorz (2017). Kresowe rezydencje. Zamki, pałace i dwory na dawnych ziemiach wschodnich II RP (in Polish). Vol. 1. Warsaw.
