= Medardas Čobotas =

Polish-Lithuanian politician

Medardas Čobotas pol. Medard Czobot (born 26 May 1928 in Medininkai - died 30 August 2009 in Vilnius) was a Polish-Lithuanian politician. In 1990 he was among those who signed the Act of the Re-Establishment of the State of Lithuania.
