= Juozapinė Hill =

Mountain in Lithuania

Coordinates: 54°31′38″N 25°37′10″E

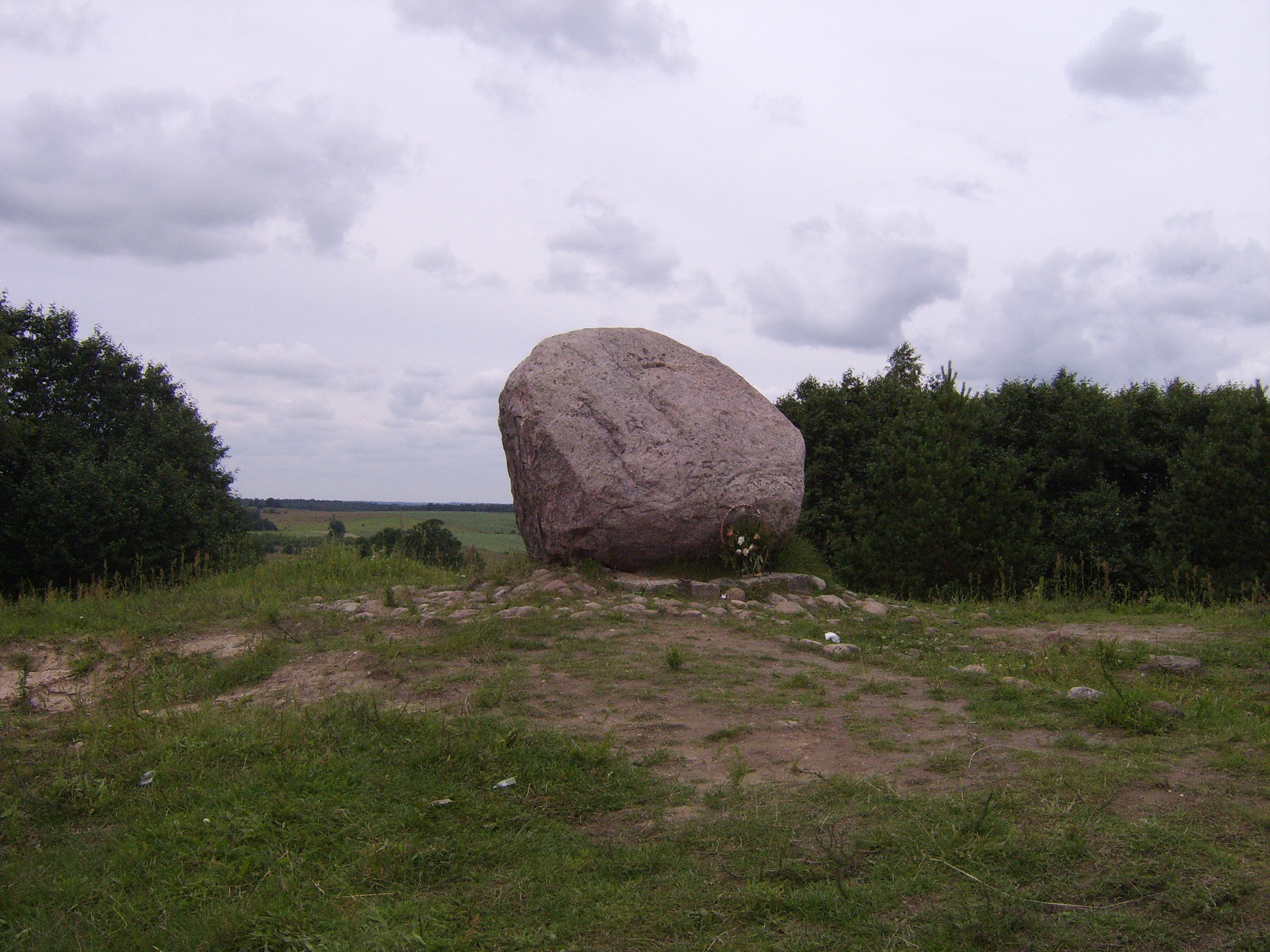
Juozapinė Hill

Juozapinė Hill is a hill located near Vilnius. It was formerly believed to be highest point in Lithuania. However, in 2007 the peaks were remeasured by staff at Vilnius Gediminas Technical University, using GPS technology. They found its elevation to be 292.7 metres (957 feet). The actual highest point in Lithuania is the nearby Aukštojas Hill (293.84 m). Juozapinė Hill is in fact only the third highest elevation in Lithuania, the second being Kruopinė (Žybartonys) Hill (293.65 m) situated approximately 10 km west of Juozapinė Hill.

Juozapinė Hill has a monument to King Mindaugas at the top.

== See also ==
- Aukštojas Hill, the actual highest point in Lithuania
- Kruopinė Hill, also formerly stated to be the highest point
