= Soviet OMON assaults on Lithuanian border posts =

1990–1991 assaults on the Lithuanian border

Assaults on border posts
- Part of Singing Revolution, January Events (Lithuania), and Dissolution of the Soviet Union
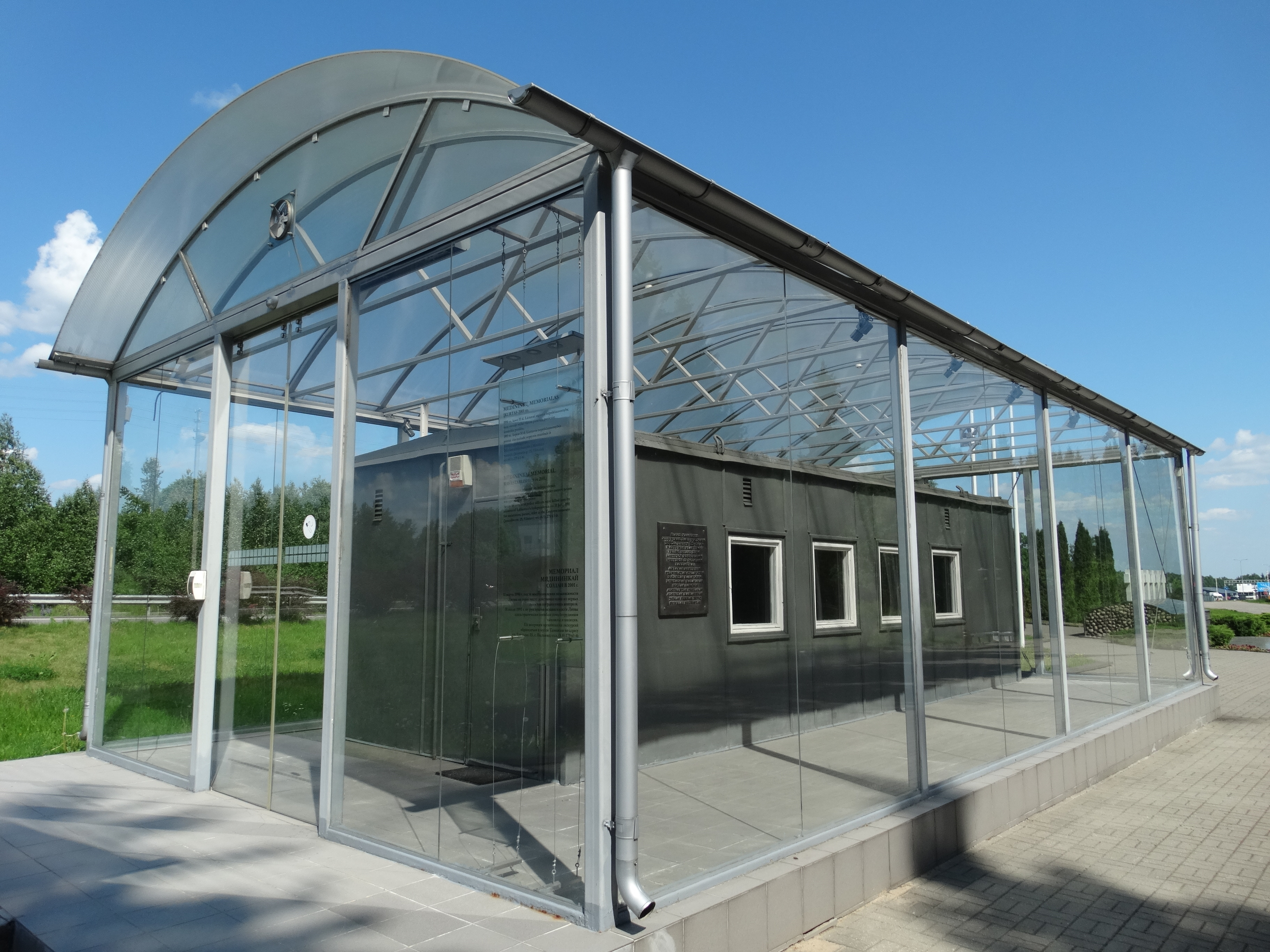
- Memorial customs wagon in a transparent enclosure in Medininkai, where seven Lithuanian officers were killed
Date	17 December 1990 – 22 August 1991
Location	Lithuania
Result	Lithuanian victory: Lithuanian statehood preserved

Belligerents
Lithuania: State Border Guard Service; Riflemen's Union	Soviet Union: OMON

Commanders and leaders
(Lithuania) Vytautas Landsbergis (Lithuania) Audrius Butkevičius	(Soviet Union) Mikhail Gorbachev (Soviet Union) Dmitry Yazov

Casualties and losses
8 killed 60 injured	1 killed

Several Soviet OMON (Special Purpose Police Unit) assaults on Lithuanian border posts occurred after Lithuania declared its independence from the Soviet Union on 11 March 1990. As a Soviet republic, the Lithuanian SSR did not have a state border with customs or checkpoints. The newly declared Republic of Lithuania began establishing the State Border Guard Service, before it was internationally recognized on 27 August 1991 by the states of the European Community. These posts also became a symbol of its struggle for independence. The Soviet government viewed the customs posts as illegal and sent the OMON troops to harass the posts, especially those along the eastern border with Byelorussian SSR. The unarmed customs officers and armed policemen were intimidated, beaten or killed, their cars were stolen or bombed, the posts were burned down or wrecked, and work of the checkpoints was otherwise disrupted. Two of the incidents resulted in the deaths of a total of eight Lithuanian citizens. In total, about 60 officers were attacked and injured, and 23 border posts were burned or destroyed.

== Early attacks ==
The first incident occurred on 17 December 1990 in Eišiškės. Shift leader Petras Pumputis was beaten, lost consciousness, and was taken to a hospital with a cerebral hemorrhage. The first organized attacks were organized following the events of 11–13 January 1991 in Vilnius when 14 civilians were killed near the Vilnius TV Tower. Soviet troops attacked and burned border posts in Medininkai and Lavoriškės on 27 January. On 1 March, OMON troops fired at a border guard bus returning from Vilnius. Three Lithuanian guards were injured.

In mid-May 1991, various incidents were reported almost daily. On 18 May, Belarusian police captain A. Fiyaz fired at a Lithuanian post in Šalčininkai with a TT pistol; Fiyaz was killed when a Lithuanian officer returned fire with a hunting rifle. Fearing retaliation, the Lithuanian officers were ordered to leave their posts. Officer Gintaras Žagunis did not leave his station in Krakūnai and was killed on 19 May. Žagunis was given a public funeral in the Antakalnis Cemetery. The same night two other posts were burned down. On 23 May, OMON troops from Riga assaulted border posts on the Lithuanian–Latvian border in Vegeriai, Mažeikiai, Germaniškis, Saločiai, and Smėlynė. Five Latvian posts were also attacked. The attack on Smėlynė was filmed by Alexander Nevzorov and later shown on Leningrad TV.

Following these attacks, Lithuanian Prime Minister Gediminas Vagnorius officially complained to Boris Pugo, Soviet Minister of Internal Affairs in charge of OMON troops. Moscow denied responsibility for the attacks and claimed that the OMON troops acted without their approval. Mikhail Gorbachev disclaimed any knowledge of the attacks and ordered Pugo to investigate. However, on 24 and 25 May five more posts were assaulted. Lithuania appealed to western countries asking to protest about the actions of the Soviet government. Moscow continued to deny responsibility, but admitted that the actions of OMON troops were criminal. Despite promises to intervene, the attacks continued through mid-June. On 28 June, Moscow took the first actions to discipline OMON – its leaders were called to explain themselves and were reassigned.

== Medininkai incident ==
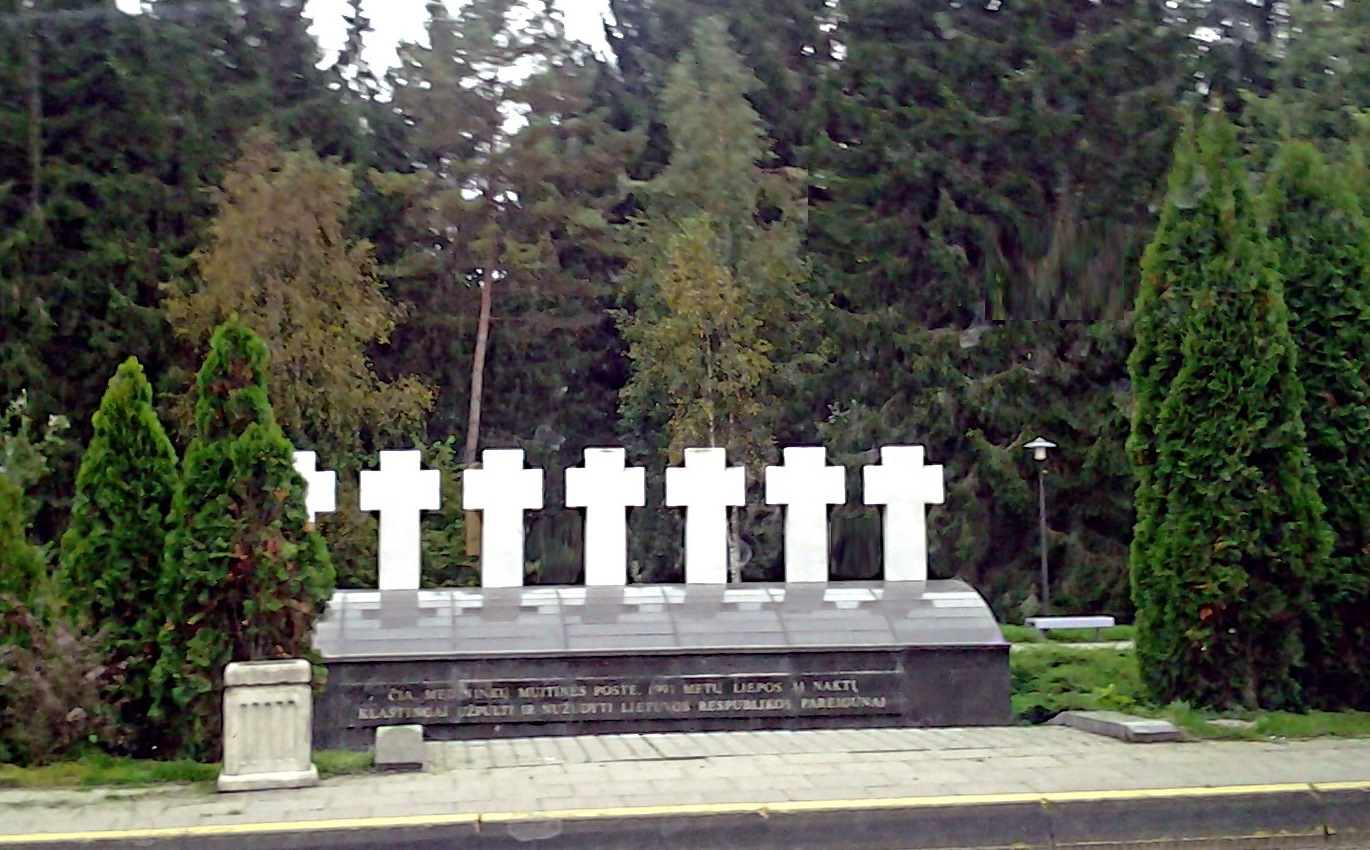
Monument to the seven Lithuanian customs officers killed on 31 July 1991 in Medininkai

The most serious attack occurred when OMON troops from Riga attacked the Lithuanian customs post in Medininkai on the Vilnius–Minsk highway on 31 July 1991. It is thought that the attack took place around 04:00, because a watch belonging to one of the victims stopped at this hour. Seven officers were shot and killed: Mindaugas Balavakas and Algimantas Juozakas (officers of the Special Division ARAS), Juozas Janonis and Algirdas Kazlauskas (officers of the highway police), Antanas Musteikis, Stanislovas Orlavičius and Ričardas Rabavičius (customs officers). Rabavičius died on 2 August in hospital. The only survivor, customs officer Tomas Šernas, suffered severe brain damage and became disabled. The ARAS officers were supposed to provide protection to the post and were armed. However, their weapons were missing from the scene and there were no signs of returned fire. The Lithuanian officers were forced to lie down on the ground and then shot in the head, execution style. Those killed were buried in the Antakalnis Cemetery. The victims were awarded the Cross of Vytis (6 September 1991) and the Medal of 13 January (9 January 1992).

The incident occurred during US President George H. W. Bush's two-day visit in Moscow. Bush specifically addressed the incident in one of the press conferences, but downplayed its importance in the Lithuanian struggle for international recognition and shielded Gorbachev from responsibility. It was speculated that the assailants wanted to embarrass Gorbachev showcasing his inability to control the situation in the collapsing Soviet Union. The attack might have been a response to a treaty between Lithuania and Boris Yeltsin, newly elected President of Russian SFSR. The treaty established formal diplomatic relations and addressed economic and cultural issues between Lithuania and Russia; it was seen as an important step towards recognition of Lithuania's independence. Another version claims that the guards discovered a large smuggling operation.

== Investigation and trials ==
The attacks stopped after the executions in Medininkai, save for an attack on a post in Kybartai on 22 August 1991 during the August Coup in Moscow. After the coup failed, the Soviet Union disintegrated. Members of OMON dispersed throughout the former union, many of them becoming citizens of the Russia Federation. The Lithuanian government attempted to investigate the attacks and prosecute the suspects, but the efforts were hindered by complex extradition requests. In December 1991, the Lithuanians presented to Russia a list of more than 20 people wanted for their involvement in January Events and Medininkai incident. However, the Lithuanians were refused even requests to question witnesses.

=== Trial of Konstantin Mikhailov ===
In December 2006, the Lithuanian prosecutors issued a European Arrest Warrant for Latvian citizen Konstantin Nikulin, a suspect in the Medininkai killings. He was arrested by Latvian police on 28 November 2007. Nikulin had already been tried and received a suspended sentence of 2.5 years in 2004 for his involvement in the January 1991 events in Latvia. After the trial, Nikulin became a key witness to an unrelated murder and changed his surname to Konstantin Mikhailov (Konstantinas Michailovas) as part of a witness protection program. On 28 January 2008, the Supreme Court of Latvia decided to extradite Mikhailov to Lithuania, and he was jailed in the Lukiškės Prison awaiting trial. The case has some 220 witnesses and volumes of written material. The statute of limitations for murder is 20 years; thus the expiration date would be July 2011. On 11 May 2011, Mikhailov was found guilty of murder and sentenced to life imprisonment. Mikhailov appealed against the decision claiming innocence while Lithuanian prosecutors appealed against the decision hoping to convict Mikhailov of crimes against humanity. On 6 June 2016, the Appeals Court upheld the life imprisonment sentence and reclassified the crime from murder to "acts against people prohibited by international law" (Article 100 of the Criminal Code of Lithuania). Mikhailov appealed the decision to the Supreme Court of Lithuania which started its proceedings on 11 January 2017. The Supreme Court upheld the conviction on 28 February, but Mikhailov submitted an appeal to the European Court of Human Rights.

=== In absentia trials ===
Other suspects in the Medininkai case, namely commander Czeslaw Mlynnik (Česlavas Mlinykas), Alexander Ryzhov (Aleksandras Ryžovas), and Andrei Laktionov (Andrejus Laktionovas), are citizens of Russia and have not been extradited. In 2009, Ryzhov was tried for organized crime and armed robbery in Saint Petersburg, and in June 2011 he received a 15-year sentence. In December 2010, Lithuania amended its Criminal Code to allow in absentia trials in cases of crimes against humanity. In June 2013, the Lithuanians completed pre-trial procedures in absentia for a trial of the three men for crimes against humanity. Lithuania has issued European Arrest Warrants for the three men. All three were sentenced in absentia to life imprisonment in October 2016; they are also liable to pay 653,850 euros to the state to cover expenses of state funerals, benefits and pensions to relatives, medical expenses of the survivors, etc. as well as a further 100,000 euros in compensation to each parent, spouse, and child of the killed men. Another suspect, Igor Gorban, was identified by the only survivor Tomas Šernas during Gorban's 2004 trial in Riga. However, Gorban was not charged due to lack of evidence.

Another in absentia trial concerns Vilnius OMON commanders Boleslav Makutynovich (Boleslavas Makutynovičius) and Vladimir Razvodov (Vladimiras Razvodovas). They are not implicated in the Medininkai massacre, but are accused of ordering assaults on other border posts and other actions aimed at intimidating the public (in total, 15 specific instances). In July 2015, Vilnius District Court found them not guilty. The decision was appealed by Lithuanian prosecutors. According to unconfirmed reports, Makutynovich died in November 2015. On 24 January 2017, the Appeals Court ruled that the District Court improperly interpreted that crimes against humanity could be committed only in a time of war or other armed conflict and sentenced Razvodov to 12 years imprisonment and 14,000 euros in compensation for damages. Razvodov is believed to live in Russia, and Lithuania has issued a European Arrest Warrant for him.
