= Belarus–Lithuania border =

International border

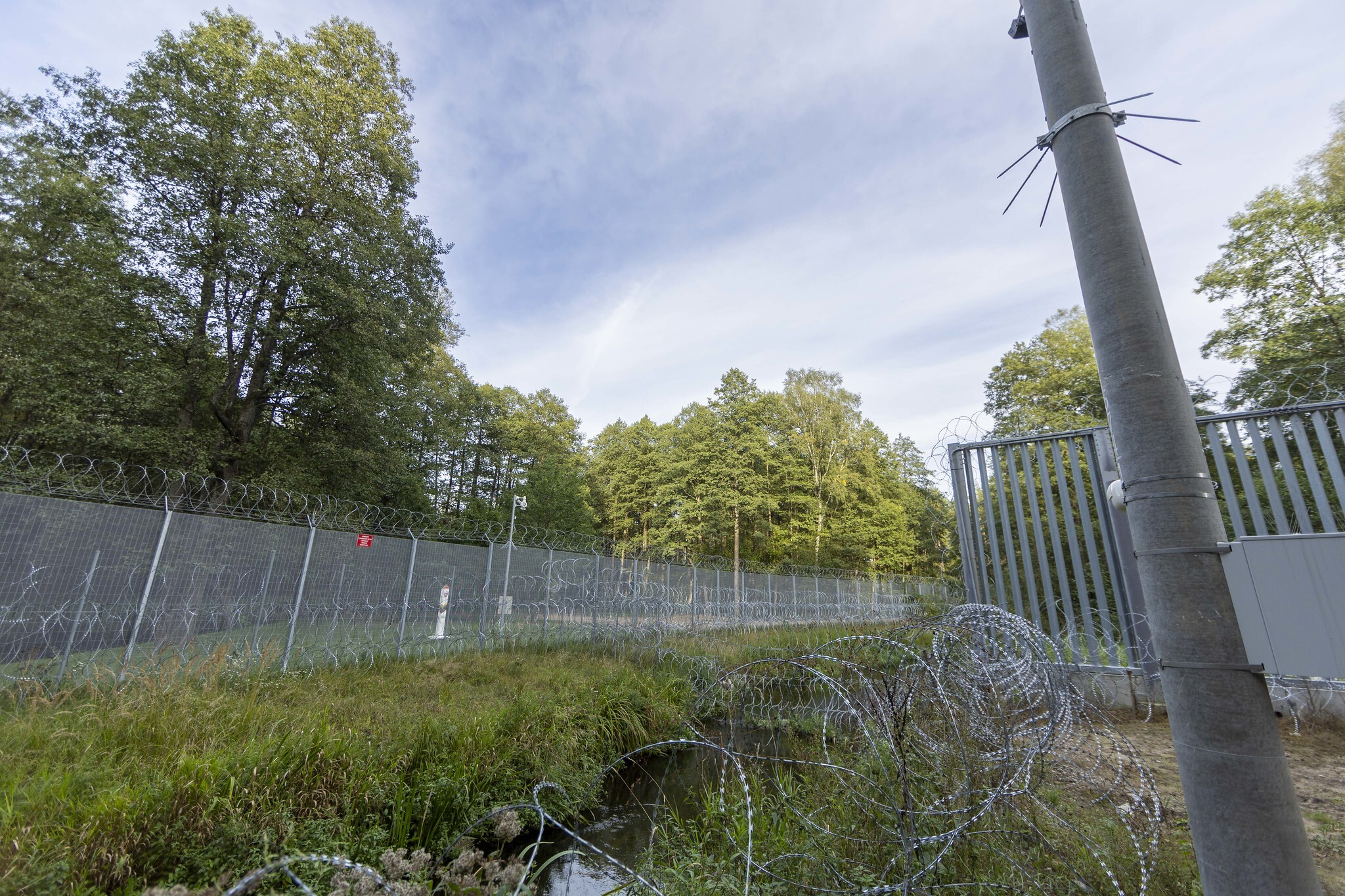
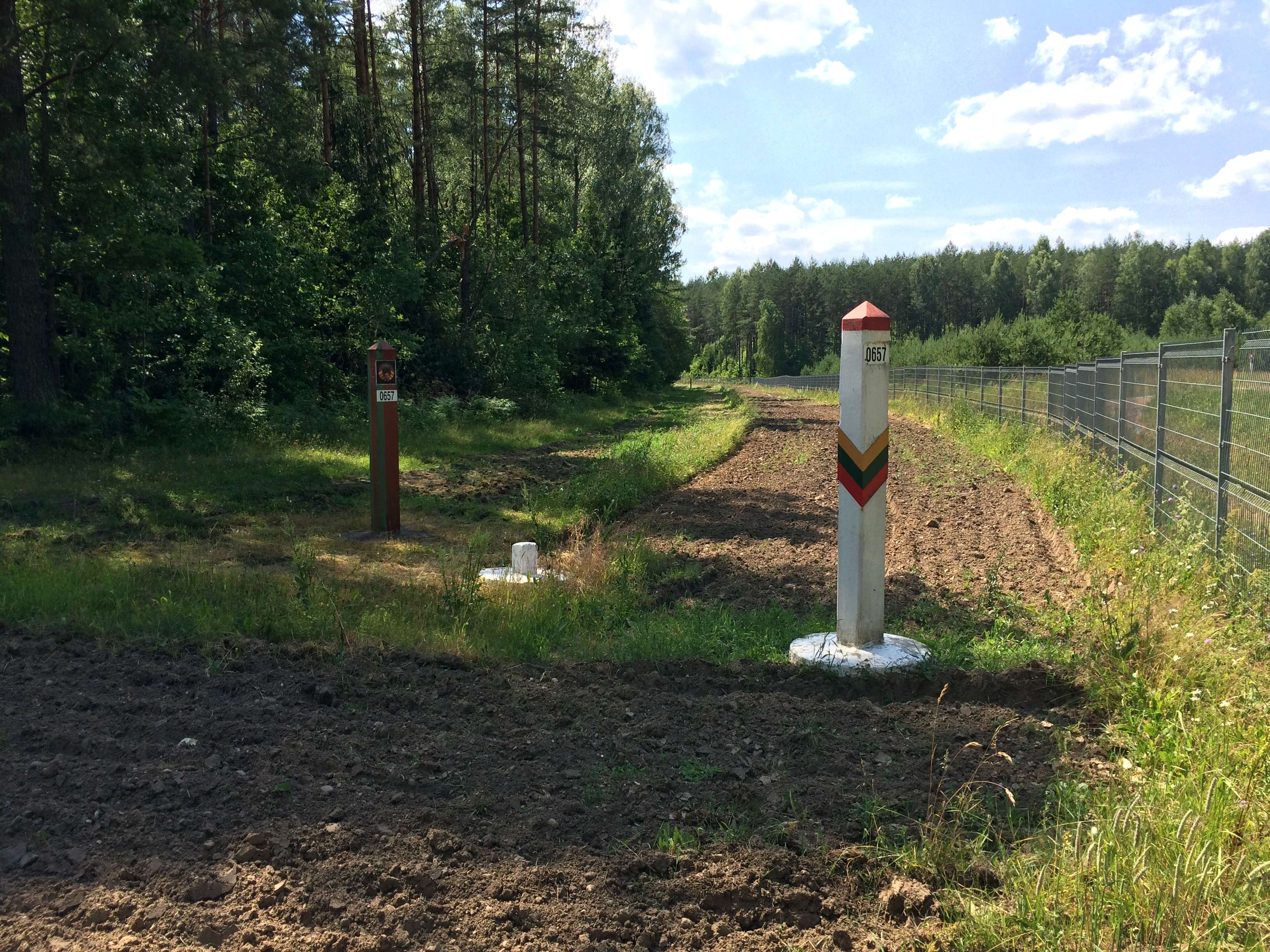
- Border barrier built by Lithuania in 2022 (top); Border markers with the old fence in 2015 (bottom)

Characteristics
- Entities: Belarus Lithuania
- Length: 678.8 km (421.8 mi)

History
- Established: 1920; 1940
- Current shape: 6 February 1995
- Treaties: Soviet–Lithuanian Peace Treaty (1920); Agreement between the Republic of Lithuania and the Republic of Belarus concerning the State Border between Lithuania and Belarus (1995)

Belarusian and Lithuanian boundary markers

The Belarus–Lithuania border is an international border almost 678.8 km (421.8 mi) in length between the Republic of Belarus (CIS member) and the Republic of Lithuania (EU member). It is an external border of the European Union as well as the western border of the Commonwealth of Independent States. 379.9 km (236.1 mi) of the border is on land, while 298.9 km (185.7 mi) are on water, crossing lakes, e.g. Lake Drūkšiai and following some rivers, e.g. Dysna River and Neman River.

In August 2022, Lithuania completed the construction of a new border barrier to stop illegal migration. On 18 January 2023, the Lithuanian government renounced the agreement signed with Belarus 16 years ago on the principles of cross-border cooperation.

== History ==
The historical borders of the Grand Duchy of Lithuania and later, following the partitions of the Polish–Lithuanian Commonwealth, governorates of the Russian Empire varied significantly throughout the history and at times bore little resemblance to the modern borders. The formation of the current border began after the World War I, following the establishment of the Republic of Lithuania and the Lithuanian–Soviet War. The Soviet-Lithuanian Peace Treaty was signed on 12 July 1920, defining and recognizing the eastern border of Lithuania, even though it was de facto controlled by Poland due to the Polish–Lithuanian War and Polish–Soviet War. It was similar to the present border, but the Vilnius region was de facto controlled by Second Polish Republic. Following the World War II and the Soviet occupation of the Baltic states, a new border was established between the Lithuanian Soviet Socialist Republic and Byelorussian Soviet Socialist Republic within the Soviet Union. It is the basis of the current border which had remained largely stable since 1940.

The border is defined by the treaty of 6 February 1995 between the two countries. The demarcation of the border was completed in 2007. Since 2004 the border has served as the external border of the European Union and, since 2007, the Schengen Area. These developments brought increased border controls and stricter visa requirements for crossing between the two countries. An agreement signed in 2010 aims to implement simplified traveling for people living within 50 km (31 mi) of the border.

== Definition of the border ==
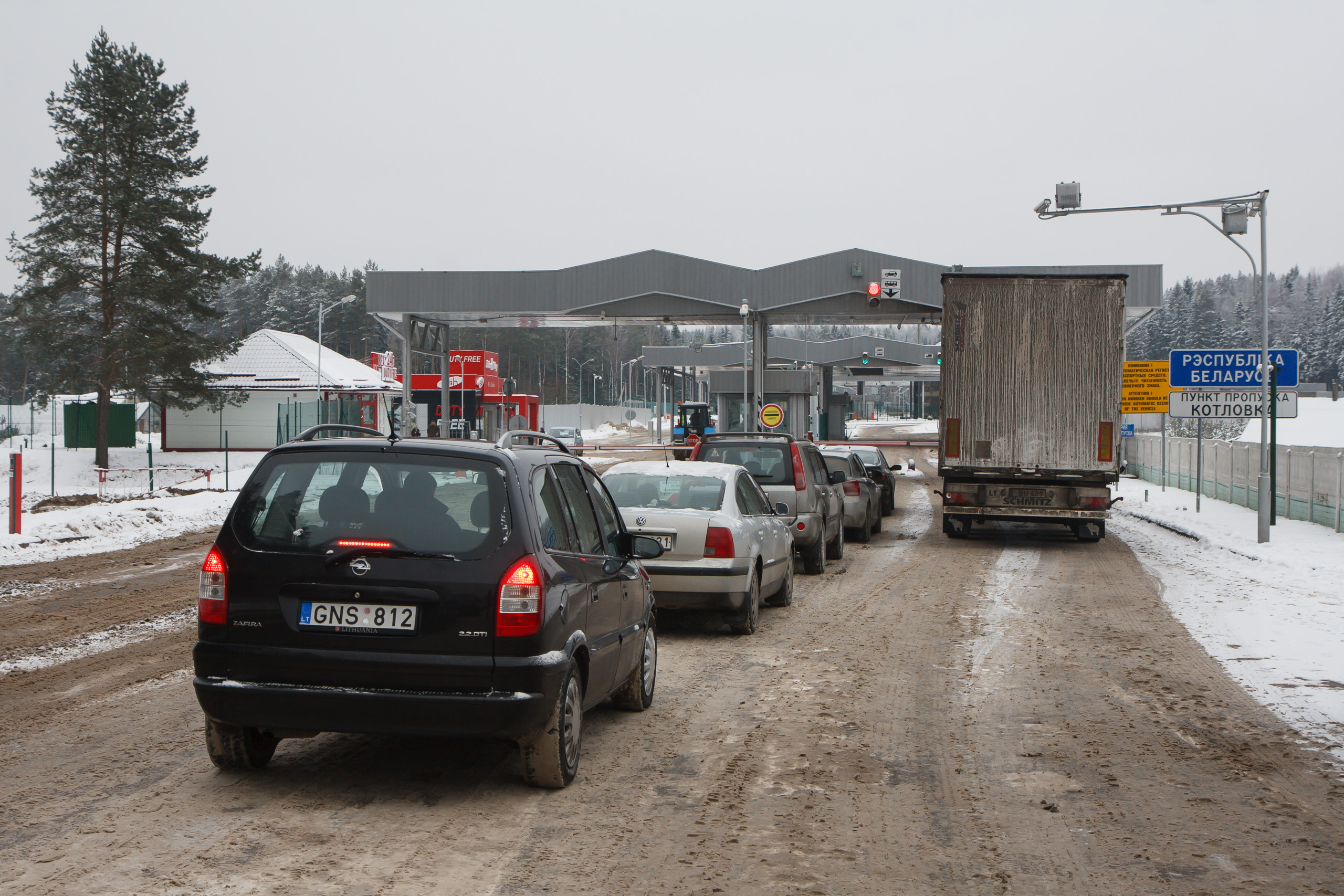
Lavoriškės — Kotlovka border point.

The treaty defines the border as starting at the border tripoint of Lithuania, Latvia and Belarus (the Soviet-built 'Friendship Kurgan' monument, 55°40′50″N 26°37′48″E). It goes southeast across Lake Drūkšiai, following river Apyvardė, across lakes Apvardai and Prūtas, further following Dysna River to the east, and further to Adutiškis railway station. It further goes north of Belarusian settlement Lyntupy, east of the Lithuanian settlement Šumskas, across the road Vilnius – Maladzyechna, goes around the area of Lithuanian settlement Dieveniškės from the east, south and west, goes to the North of Belarusian settlement Bieniakoni, crosses the road Vilnius-Lida and further follows Šalčia river. It further continues to the south of Lithuanian city Eišiškės, follows Načia river, goes to the south of Lithuanian settlement Dubičiai, reaches the source of Kotra River and further follows this river, then across lakes Grūda ir Dubas. It further crosses the railroad Vilnius-Grodno next to the stop Senovė, and the railroad to Druskininkai to the north of the stop Pariečė, continuing west towards Neman river and up against the current, and further following Mara river to the border tripoint of Belarus, Lithuania and Poland (53°57′22″N 23°30′54″E).

On 18 January 2023, Lithuanian government renounced the agreement signed with Belarus on the principles of cross-border cooperation. The bill terminated the agreement signed by the governments of Lithuania and Belarus in Vilnius on 1 June 2006, to set out areas of cross-border cooperation between the two neighbouring countries.

== Incidents ==
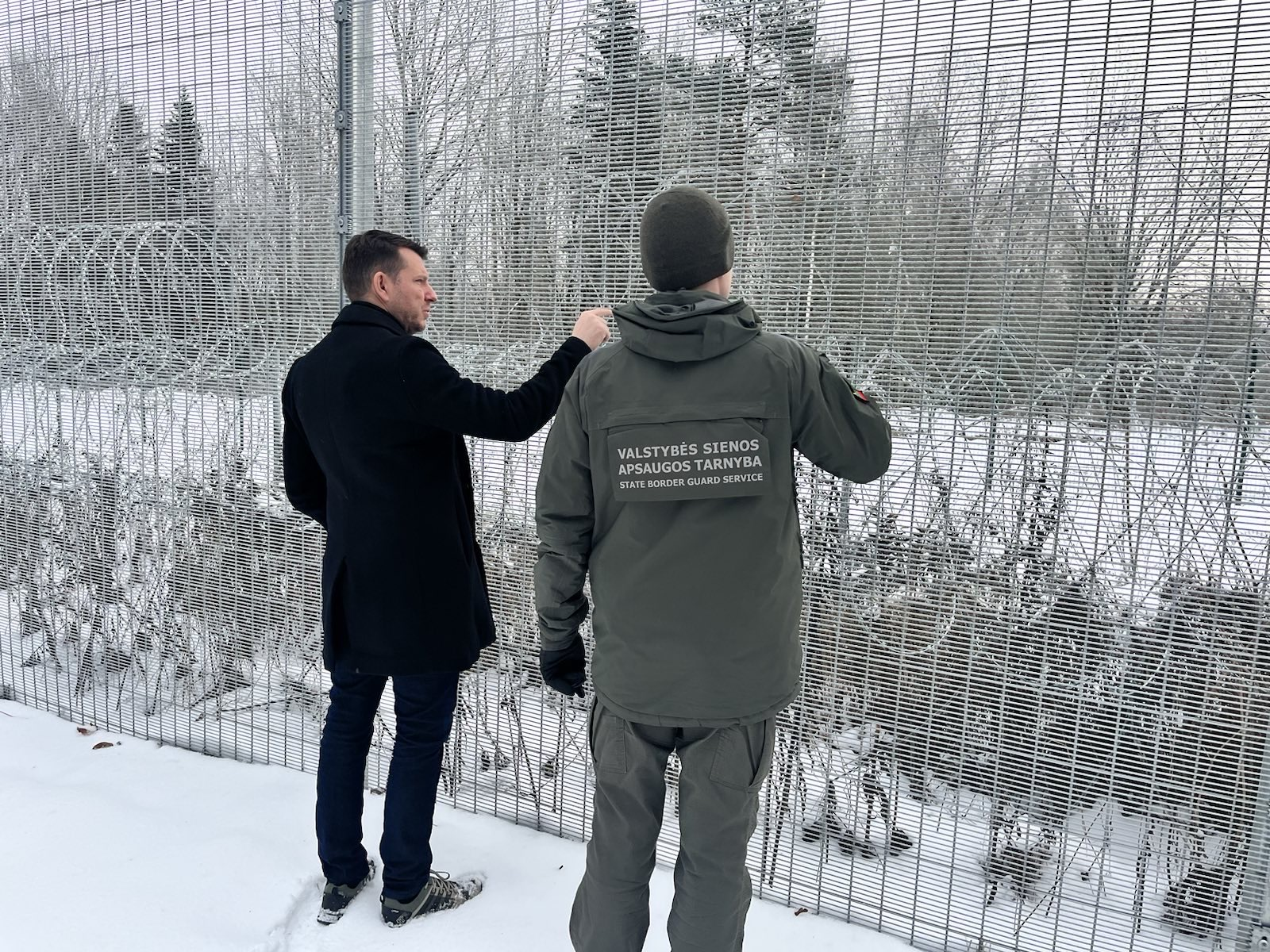
Lithuanian State Border Guard Service official shows the barrier with the Concertina wire

In June 2021, Lithuanian officials claimed that Belarusian authorities could encourage illegal migration from Iraq and Syria to Lithuania by organizing groups of refugees and helping them to cross the Belarusian-Lithuanian border. It was assumed that the state support of illegal migration could be carried out for political reasons. Illegal migration from Belarus forced Lithuania to declare state of emergency on 7 July 2021.

Year	Number of illegal migrants crossed Belarus—Lithuania border
2017	72
2018	104
2019	46
2020	81
2021–present	4,613

== Border barrier ==
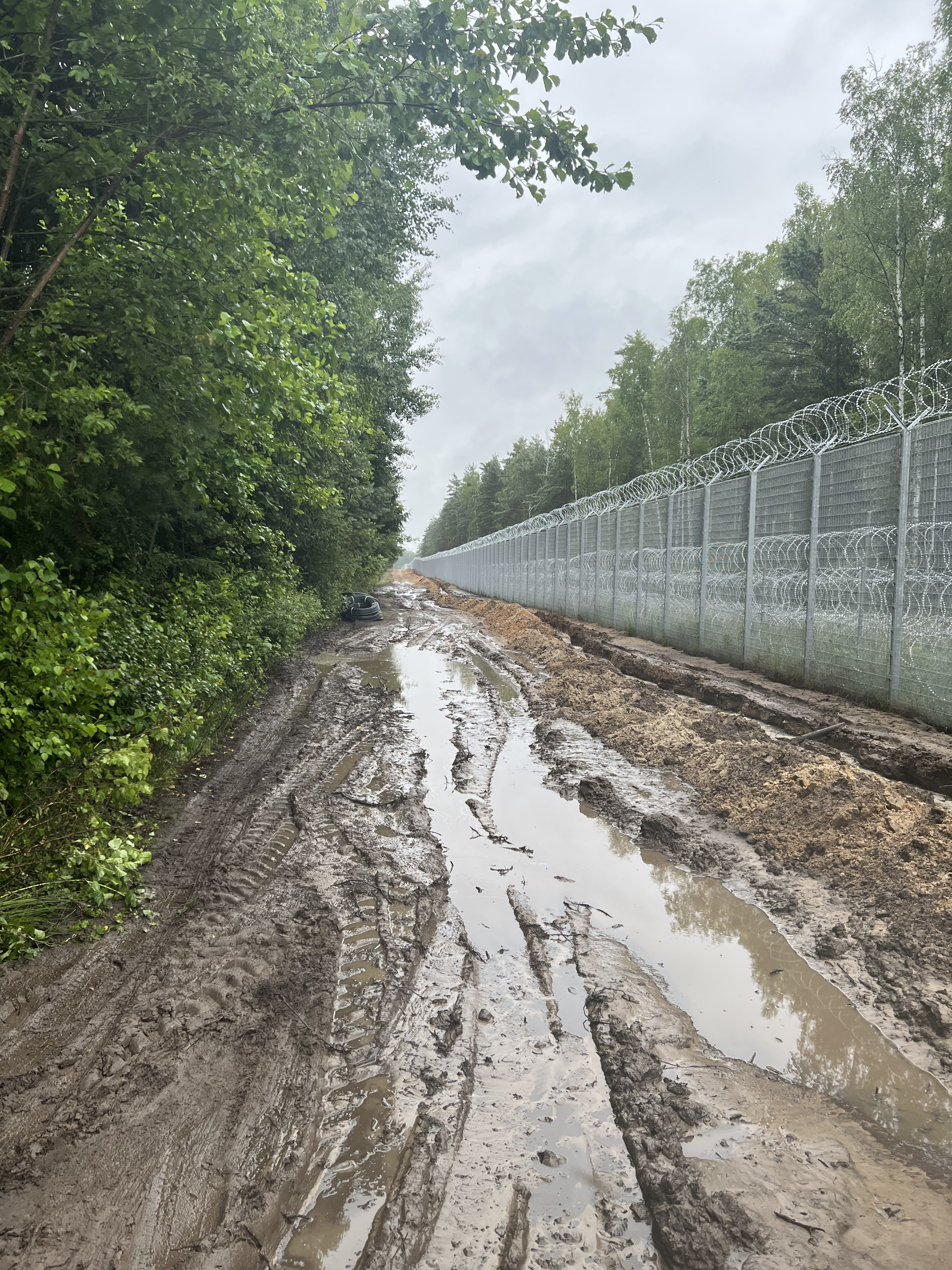
Barrier with the Concertina wire near Ašašninkai village, Lithuania

Lithuania decided to build a border barrier to stem the flow of illegal crossings. On 5 August 2021, the chief of the Lithuanian State Border Guard Service presented a project of the proposed barrier for the entire Belarus-Lithuania border which would be 4 m (13 ft) high and would use multiple layers of the Concertina wire. The cost of the project was estimated at €150 million and the Lithuanian parliament approved it as a matter of urgency. Lithuania completed the 502 km (312 mi) barrier in August 2022 and the modern surveillance equipment was installed by the end of the year. In March 2023, the Lithuanian authorities announced that 100% of the border is surveilled.

== Border crossings ==
This table lists the road border crossings between Belarus and Lithuania (from north to south):

Belarus checkpoint	BY road	status	Lithuanian checkpoint	LT road	Position	Ref
Vidzy		closed	Tverečius	4402	55.3235972°N 26.6349069°E	
Moldevichi		closed	Adutiškis	110	55.1493410°N 26.6251620°E	
Lyntupy	P110	closed	Papelekis	109	55.0847043°N 26.259973°E	
Kotlovka (Katlouka)	P45	closed	Lavoriškės	103	54.7187436°N 25.7453341°E	
Losha	P48	closed	Šumskas	101	54.5916067°N 25.7575301°E	
Kamenny Log (Kamenny Loh)		open	Medininkai		54.544278°N 25.6996741°E	
Klyavitsa	P145	closed	Ureliai	3904	54.2750691°N 25.7294309°E	
Hutishki	P89	closed	Krakūnai	104	54.1458836°N 25.6017109°E	
Benyakoni (Beniakoni)		open	Šalčininkai		54.2728164°N 25.3763888°E	
Dotshki	P145	closed	Eišiškės	105	54.1384831°N 25.0132969°E	
Petiulevtsy	H6255	closed	Rakai	5008	53.9650688°N 24.7030114°E	
Parečča	P41	closed	Latežeris	5006	53.9373491°N 24.0800799°E	
Privalka	P42	closed	Raigardas		53.9415762°N 23.9705317°E	
Kadish	H6054	closed	Kapčiamiestis	2204	53.9317555°N 23.6822789°E	

As of February 2025, only two border crossing are open. Two border crossings, Šumskas and Tverečius, were closed by Lithuania on 18 August 2023 due to concerns over Wagner Group mercenaries and smuggling. In January 2024, Lithuania decided to impose movement restrictions and close two more border crossings, Lavoriškės and Raigardas, effective 1 March 2024. It was also decided to suspend pedestrian and cyclist crossings through the Medininkai and Šalčininkai border checkpoints, and to prohibit passenger boarding and disembarkation at the Kena railway border checkpoint and the Kybartai railway border checkpoint. The Lithuanian government cited national security concerns, smuggling and violations of international sanctions as the reasons behind the decision.

On October 28, 2025, by decision of the Lithuanian government, all Lithuania–Belarus border checkpoints were closed for at least one month due to repeated shipments of contraband balloons from that country. The border checkpoints were reopened on November 20, 2025. In response, Belarus banned Lithuanian trucks from leaving the country. The vehicles were directed to special parking lots, and the drivers were released to go home. On 10 March 2026, the majority of the trucks were returned to Lithuania.

== Former border crossings ==
The following two border crossings are listed by the European Union as legal crossings for local border traffic, but were closed even before the current crisis.

Belarus checkpoint	BY road	status	Lithuanian checkpoint	LT road	Position	Ref
Kamelishki (Kemelishki)		closed	Prienai		54.8717373°N 25.8097727°E	
Petskuny		closed	Norviliškės		54.2320197°N 25.7800765°E	

== See also ==
- Baltic Defence Line
- Belarus–Lithuania relations
