= Slabada (Lavoriškės) =

- Village
- Location of Slabada
- Coordinates: 54°42′40″N 25°37′08″E
- Country: Lithuania
- County: Vilnius County
- Municipality: Vilnius District Municipality
- Eldership: Lavoriškės Eldership

Population (2021)
  - Total: 165
- Time zone: UTC+2 (EET)
  - Summer (DST): UTC+3 (EEST)

Slabada is a village in Vilnius District Municipality, Lithuania. According to the 2021 census, it had population of 165.
