= Tomas Šernas =

Lithuanian customs officer

Tomas Šernas (born 28 April 1962 in Vilnius) is a former Lithuanian customs officer and the only survivor of the Medininkai Massacre on 31 July 1991. He survived the point-blank shot to his head, but became disabled. After extensive medical treatment and rehabilitation, Šernas graduated from theological studies at Klaipėda University and joined the Reformed churches as a parson of the Vilnius parish. In 2010, he was elected for a three-year term as the General Superintendent of the Evangelical Reformed Church of Lithuania.

== Biography ==
Šernas is a relative of signatory Jokūbas Šernas (1888–1926) and General Superintendent Adomas Šernas (1884–1965). Born to a family of music teachers, Šernas studied veterinary in Buivydiškės. After graduation in 1983, he was drafted to the Soviet army and served two years in aviation security in Caucasus. After the army he enrolled into the Lithuanian Veterinary Academy and worked at Kaunas Zoo.

In 1990, he volunteered for pro-independence Sąjūdis and joined newly established State Border Guard Service. After Lithuania declared independence from the Soviet Union in March 1990, newly built border posts became a symbol of independence. These posts were targeted by Soviet OMON forces – custom officers and policemen were harassed or beaten, cars were stolen or bombed, the posts were burned down or wrecked. On 31 July 1991 OMON troops from Riga executed seven officers in Medininkai checkpoint on the Lithuanian–Belarusian border. Severely injured Šernas was the only survivor. He suffered brain damage and became disabled. After several years of intense therapy, he regained speech and body movement, even though he still uses a wheelchair.

In 1997, he enrolled into Klaipėda University and received a bachelor's degree in evangelical theology. He continued the religious studies at Vilnius University, earning a master's degree in 2002. On 30 June 2002 he was ordained as a priest in Vilnius and headed the Vilnius parish. Several times he was elected as vice-superintendent of the Evangelical Reformed Church of Lithuania. In June 2010 he was elected as General Superintendent for a three-year term.
