= Lavoriškės Eldership =

Lavoriškės Eldership Lavoriškių seniūnija
- Eldership
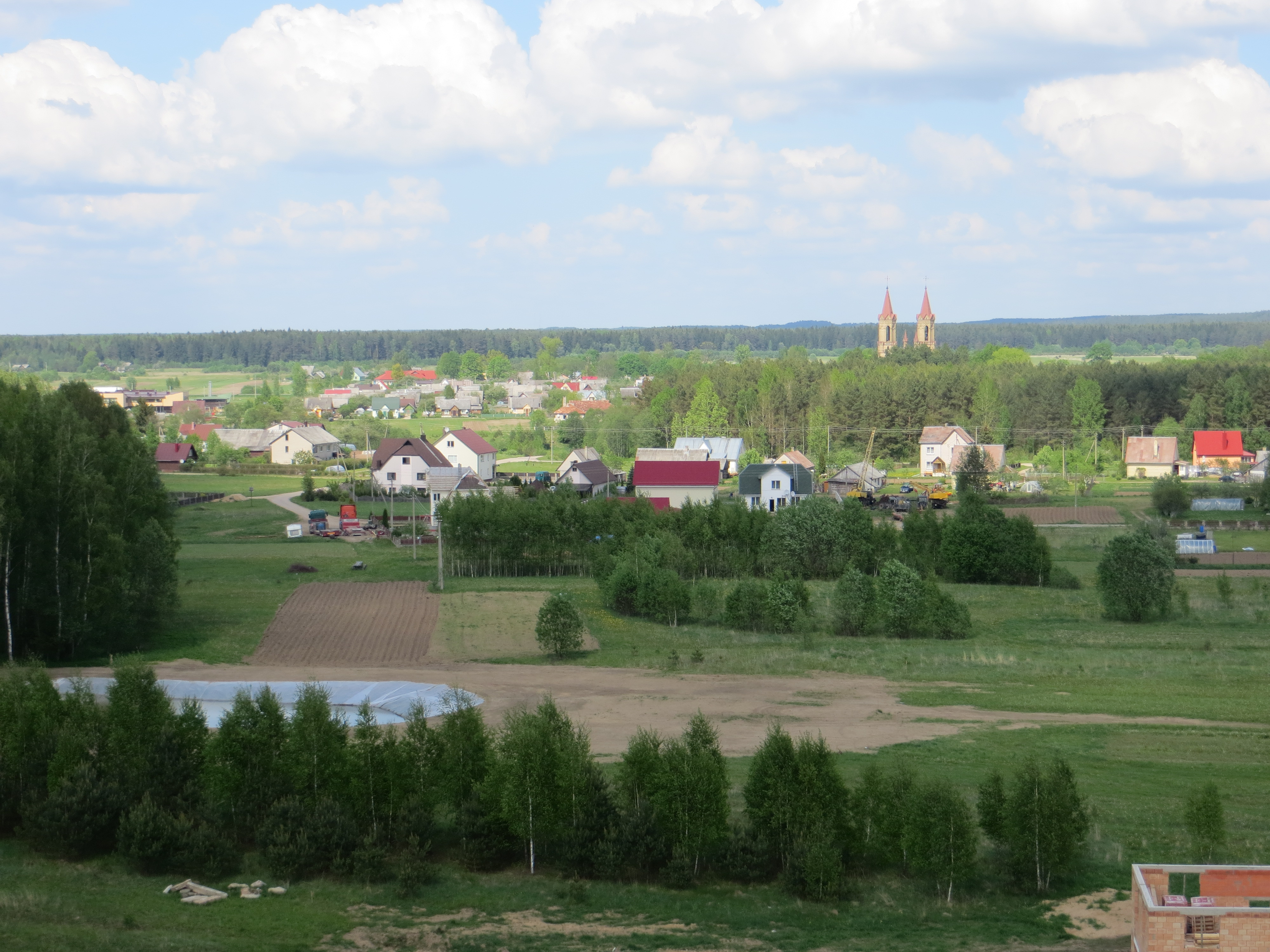
- Panorama of Lavoriškės

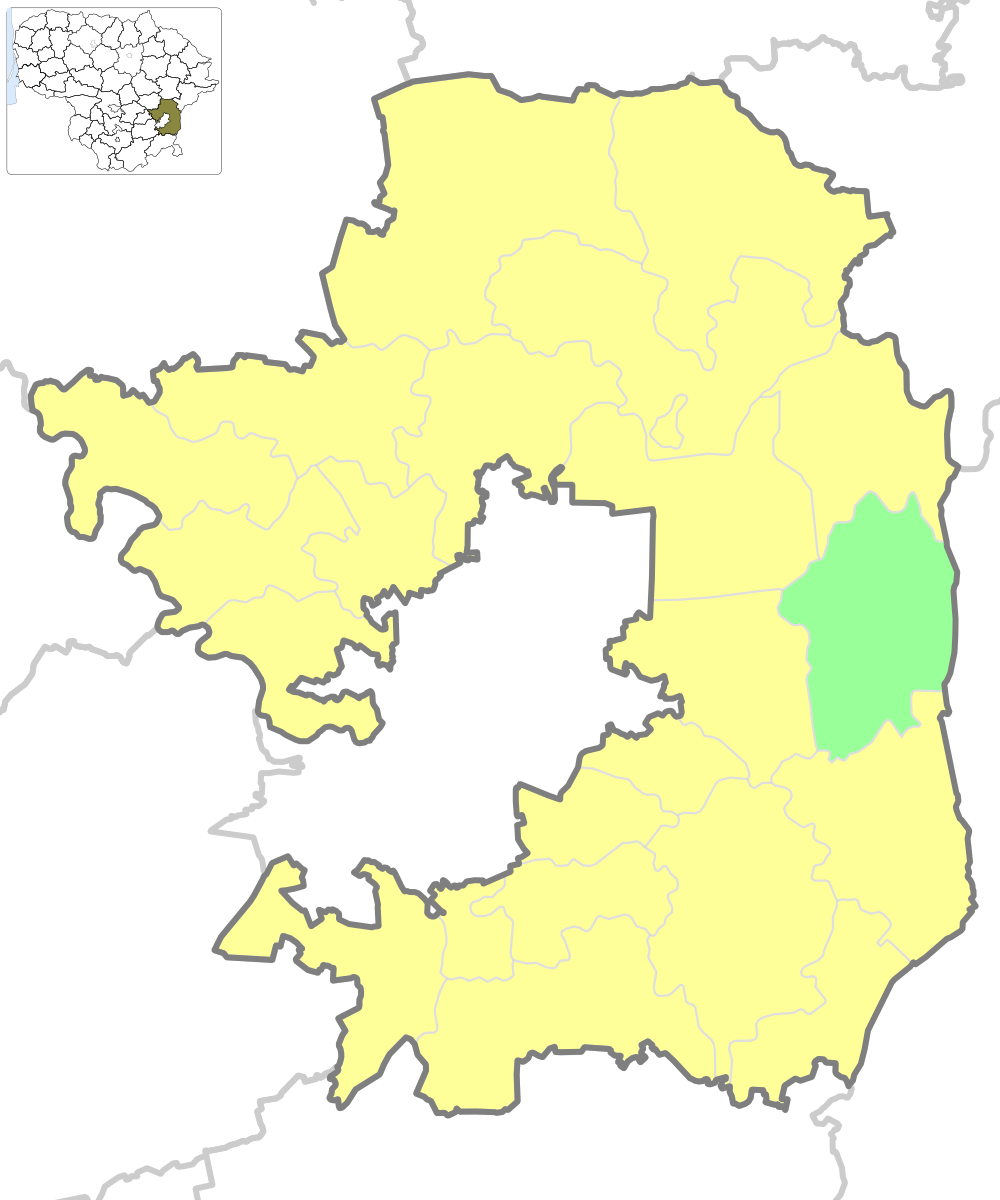
- Location of Lavoriškės Eldership
- Country: Lithuania
- Ethnographic region: Dzūkija
- County: Vilnius County
- Municipality: Vilnius District Municipality
- Administrative centre: Lavoriškės

Area
  - Total: 123 km^{2} (47 sq mi)

Population (2020)
  - Total: 2,400
  - Density: 20/km^{2} (51/sq mi)
- Time zone: UTC+2 (EET)
  - Summer (DST): UTC+3 (EEST)
- Website: https://www.vrsa.lt

Lavoriškės Eldership (Lithuanian: Lavoriškių seniūnija) is an eldership in Lithuania, located in Vilnius District Municipality.

== Populated places ==
Settlement	Status	Population (2011)	Footnotes
Adomaičiai	k	77	
Aleksandriškės	vs	0	
Alponiškė	vs	0	
Avietynė	k	0	
Bagdoniškės	vs	0	
Baravykinė	k	0	
Beržininkai	k	7	
Beržytė	k	0	
Bildžiai	k	46	
Bogudienkai	vs	0	
Budreliškės	k	7	
Bukiškės	k	24	
Burniškės	k	15	
Černuliškės	k	12	
Červiškės	k	0	
Čiriškės	vs	1	
Dekaniškės	k	65	
Dembina	k	2	
Ferma	k	56	
Galkiškės	k	4	
Gražuliškės	k	15	
Grigiškės	vs	0	
Juozapinė	k	1	
Jurzdika	vs	0	
Kaponiškės	k	2	
Karoliškės	k	10	
Kazimieriškės	k	0	
Kirtimai	k	106	
Krūminė	vs	0	
Kuleliškės	k	8	
Kuželiškės	k	5	
Labaniškės	k	12	
Lauryninkai	k	2	
Lavoriškės	k	621	
Liesiškės	k	17	
Lobiniai	k	0	
Lokinė	k	0	
Mačiuliškės	k	10	
Makovščizna	k	0	
Mandutiškės	k	0	
Margiai	vs	0	
Markiškės	k	5	
Mažiuliai	k	7	
Mostiškės	k	631	
Nevieriškės	k	99	
Pabražuolė	k	0	
Paežeriai	vs	1	
Pamiškiai	k	43	
Pauliukiškės	k	24	
Pečiulinė	vs	16	
Petruliškės	k	123	
Pridotkai	k	0	
Pukštėnai	k	0	
Puntuzai	k	18	
Putinai	k	6	
Saidotiškės	k	18	
Santaka	k	2	
Skynimai	k	51	
Slabada	k	178	
Sodybos	k	11	
Šakališkės	k	8	
Šalkiškės	k	0	
Šarkiškės	k	3	
Šniūrai	k	2	
Tvankiškės	k	39	
Vilkabrastis	vs	0	
Vitkiškės	k	0	
Vyžiškės	k	23	
Žaliašilis	k	4	

== Ethnic composition ==
According to the 2021 census, out of 2070 inhabitants:

- Poles - 78.1% (1616)
- Lithuanians - 9.8% (203)
- Belarusians - 5.9% (123)
- Russians - 4.0% (83)

According to the 2011 census:

- Poles - 81.6%
- Belarusians - 6.5%
- Lithuanians - 5.8%
- Russians - 4.5%

Lavoriškės eldership has one of the smallest numbers of Lithuanians of any eldership in Lithuania, but the overall level of the population is low as the eldership is sparsely populated and shrinking.
