= Lithuanian State Border Guard Service =

State Border Guard Service Valstybės sienos apsaugos tarnyba
- Insignia

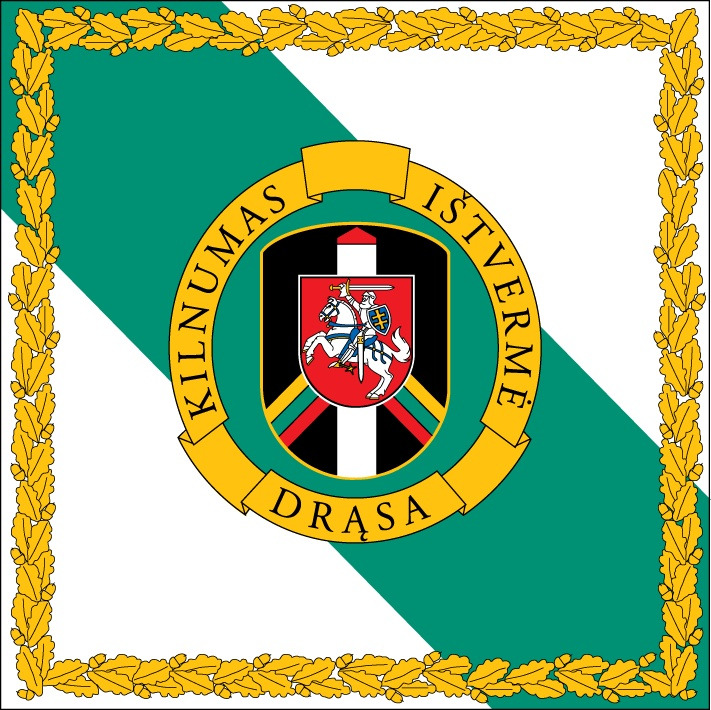
- Border guard flag
- Abbreviation: VSAT

Agency overview
- Formed: 1 May 2001
- Preceding agency: Border Police (1994–2001)
- Employees: >5,000
- Annual budget: €135.3 million (2024)

Jurisdictional structure
- National agency: Lithuania
- Operations jurisdiction: Lithuania
- Governing body: Ministry of the Interior
- Specialist jurisdictions: National border patrol, security, integrity; Coastal patrol, marine border protection, marine search and rescue

Operational structure
- Headquarters: Vilnius
- Minister responsible: Vladislav Kondratovič
- Agency executive: Gen. Rustamas Liubajevas, Commander of the State Border Guard Service
- Border Guards: 4: Border Guard School; Foreigners Registration Centre; Aviation Unit; Special Tasks Unit
- Districts: 4: Vilnius Frontier District; Varėna Frontier District; Pagėgiai Frontier District; Coast Guard District

Website
- vsat.lrv.lt

The State Border Guard Service or VSAT (Lithuanian: Valstybės sienos apsaugos tarnyba) is a border control institution under the Ministry of the Interior of Lithuania charged with controlling and maintaining the security of the Lithuanian borders on land, in the Baltic Sea and the Curonian Lagoon. VSAT is a member of the EU Frontex and is responsible for the security of about 1,070 kilometres (660 mi) of the external border of the European Union with Kaliningrad Oblast (exclave of Russia) and Belarus.

== History ==
=== 1920–1940 ===
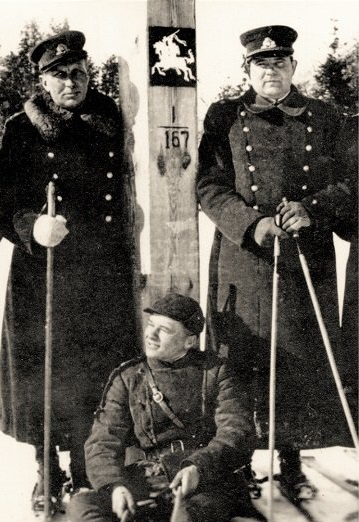
Lithuanian border guards in the Vilnius region in 1939-1940.

Following the declaration of independence on 16 February 1918, Lithuania had to ensure its border protection. This was a difficult task to fulfill, because the borders were changing (Lithuania took over the Klaipėda Region in 1923 and was in a perpetual dispute with Poland over the Vilnius Region), and the bodies protecting the border were changing as well (the customs and patrol guards, militia and army).

The formation of the 1st Border Regiment was started on 1 February 1920. On 26 January 1922, the Lithuanian defence minister, Jonas Šimkus, issued an order designating 29 June as Border Regiment Day. At that time, border regiments protected the border, and the State Border Police was formed in the Klaipėda Region on 18 June 1923. Later, border regiments, units of the Ministry of Defence, were disbanded, and the border police of the Ministry of the Interior took over the protection of the state border on 1 January 1924.

Before the first Soviet occupation, the number of Lithuanian border police was not large: 1,656 policemen in 1931 and 1,934 in 1933.

This strength was maintained until June 1940 when the Soviet Union invaded and occupied Lithuania. After that, some border guards were subject to political persecution, the border police was disbanded, and the Red Army took control of the Lithuanian border with Nazi Germany. Near the end of World War II, the Soviets occupied Lithuania for the second time. Throughout their rule, they were concerned only with the Lithuanian border with the People's Republic of Poland.

=== Restoration ===
After Lithuania restored its independence on 11 March 1990, it had to ensure the protection and inviolability of its borders. By a resolution of 3 April 1990, the Supreme Council (Lithuanian parliament) assigned the Council of Ministers the task of establishing the Department of Defence thus initiating the formation of new state border guards. On 10 September 1990, the Government adopted a resolution with a view to forming services at the Ministry of Defence that were to ensure the economic protection of the Lithuanian borders. On 10 October 1990, the Government adopted a resolution to establish 61 border posts. These posts were to begin operation by 19 November, but due to lack of resources and personnel not all of them operated as intended.

Soviet security forces, mainly OMON, carried out a campaign against unarmed Lithuanian border guards: border guards' premises were burnt and wrecked, cars stolen and bombed, and guards were beaten and harassed. On 19 May 1991, Gintaras Žagunis, an officer at the Krakūnai border crossing point at the Lithuania–Belarus border, was shot dead while on duty. On 31 July 1991, seven Lithuanian officers were killed in Medininkai border point. The only survivor, Tomas Šernas, became disabled. The attacks on Lithuanian border posts continued until the attempted August Coup in Moscow on 23 August 1991.

=== 1990s ===
The Ministry of Defence issued an order by which the Frontier Guard Service was renamed as the State Border Guard Service, starting 6 August 1992. When the last Soviet soldier left Lithuania on 31 August 1993, the State Border Guard Service was already well established. On 18 July 1994, the Government adopted a resolution that restructured the State Border Guard Service at the Ministry of Defence into the Border Police Department at the Ministry of the Interior. As during the interwar period, guarding of the Lithuanian borders became the duty of a border police.

After the system of border guarding was restored, the legal status of the state border had to be defined and the border itself demarcated. The Treaty on Restoration of the State Border between Lithuania and Latvia was signed on 29 June 1993. It required a considerable diplomatic effort to conclude and sign a treaty on the state border with Belarus on 6 February 1995. A similar treaty was signed with Poland the same year. The treaty on delimitation of the state border between Lithuania and the Russian Federation was signed during a summit in Moscow on 24 October 1997.

The border police was re-structured in 1997, 2000 and on 22 February 2001, when the government decided to re-organise the Border Police Department into the State Border Guard Service at the Ministry of the Interior. When preparing for the re-organisation, a large number of legal acts were adopted which regulate the activity of the State Border Guard Service. Of these, the most prominent are the Law on the State Border Guard Service and the Law on the State Border and Protection Thereof. Prior to the re-organisation, the status of the Border Police Department and service in the border police were regulated by the laws on the police, on state service and others as well as by the Statute of Service in the System of the Interior. These legal acts were more about the general activity of the police. After the re-organisation was complete, the State Border Guard Service began to perform its border guard functions starting 1 May 2001.

=== 2000s and later ===
Lithuania became a member of the European Union on 1 May 2004 and of the Schengen Area on 21 December 2007. The Lithuanian border with Kaliningrad Oblast (Russia) and Belarus became the external border of the EU and the Schengen Area. The passport control on the Latvian and Polish borders was eliminated while the checks on the Russian and Belarusian borders was strengthened.

In 2021, during the Belarus–European Union border crisis, Lithuania experienced a large influx of illegal migrants trying to enter the country. Illegal migration from Belarus forced the Lithuanian government to declare a state-level "extraordinary situation" (similar but weaker legal regime than the state of emergency) in July 2021 to enable the border guards better protect the border. In August 2021, the State Border Guard Service presented a project of the proposed barrier for the entire Belarus–Lithuania border which would be 4 m (13 ft) high and would use multiple layers of the Concertina wire. The Lithuanian parliament approved it as a matter of urgency. Meanwhile, by the end of July, EU Frontex deployed 100 officers, 30 patrol cars and 2 helicopters to support the border protection.

In 2024, taking into account the lessons from the Russian invasion of Ukraine, the government decided to equip the border guards with the heavy weapons. As of late 2024, the border guards were equipped with Heckler & Koch G36 assault rifles and FN Minimi machine guns.

== Structure ==
=== Districts ===
VSAT is divided into the following districts:

- Vilnius Frontier District operates 415km boder section with Belarus
- Varėna Frontier District operates along a 207km border section of the border with Belarus
- Pagėgiai Frontier District 178km border section with Russia
- Coast Guard District

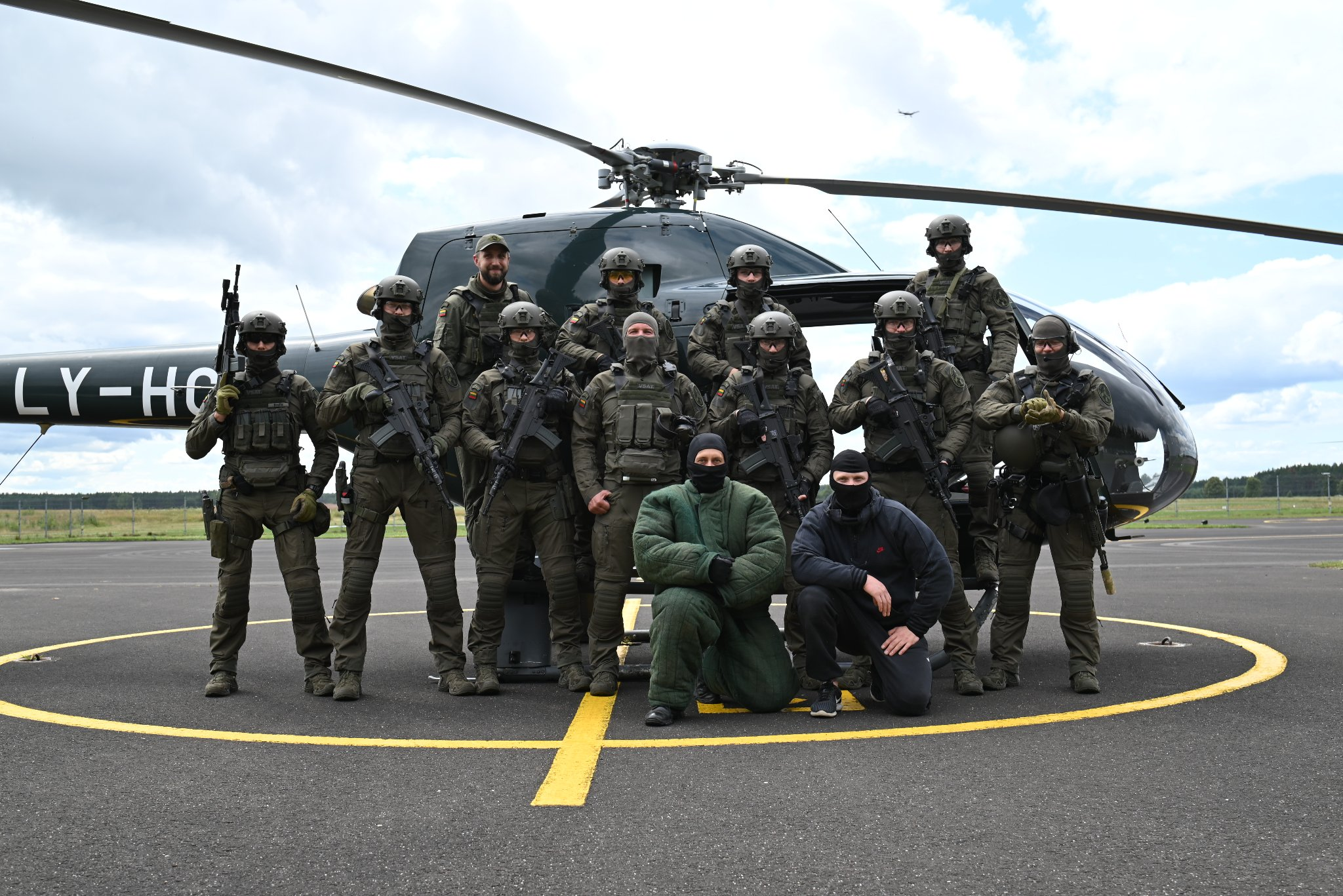
Vilnius "Perkūnas" Special Purpose Team

=== Special unit ===
Special Purpose Command "Kovas" was formed in 2025 by expanding Special Purpose Unit (SPS). May be deployed to support border guard officers in unusual situations. Performs raids and ambushes, criminal and military surveillance, and convoys with the Criminal Department of the State Border Guard Service. It operates in border areas, within the country, and abroad. There are known cases of the unit being used for riot control.

The command includes the following units:

- West Special Purpose Unit
- East Special Purpose Unit

=== Aviation unit ===
The Aviation Unit of the Lithuanian State Border Guard Service received new helicopters to patrol the European Union external border. Available aircraft in service:

Aircraft	Origin	Type	Entered service	Versions	In service
Eurocopter EC 120	Europe	single-engine light utility helicopter	2002	EC 120B	2
Eurocopter EC 135	Europe	twin-engine light utility helicopter	2006	EC 135T2+	2
Eurocopter EC 145	Europe	twin-engine light utility helicopter	2006		1
Eurocopter EC 145	Europe	twin-engine light utility helicopter	2025	H145M D3 variants	3

=== Border Guards School ===
Border Guards School tasked with provides training for border guards personnel

== Ranks ==
Commissioned officer ranks

NATO code	OF-10	OF-9	OF-8	OF-7	OF-6	OF-5	OF-4	OF-3	OF-2	OF-1
Lithuanian State Border Guard Service
Lithuanian State Border Guard Service					Generolas	Pulkininkas	Pulkininkas leitenantas	Majoras	Kapitonas	Vyresnysis leitenantas	Leitenantas

Other ranks

NATO code	OR-9	OR-8	OR-7	OR-6	OR-5	OR-4	OR-3	OR-2	OR-1
Lithuanian State Border Guard Service
Lithuanian State Border Guard Service			Vyresnysis puskarininkis	Puskarininkis	Jaunesnysis puskarininkis	Grandinis

== Gallery ==
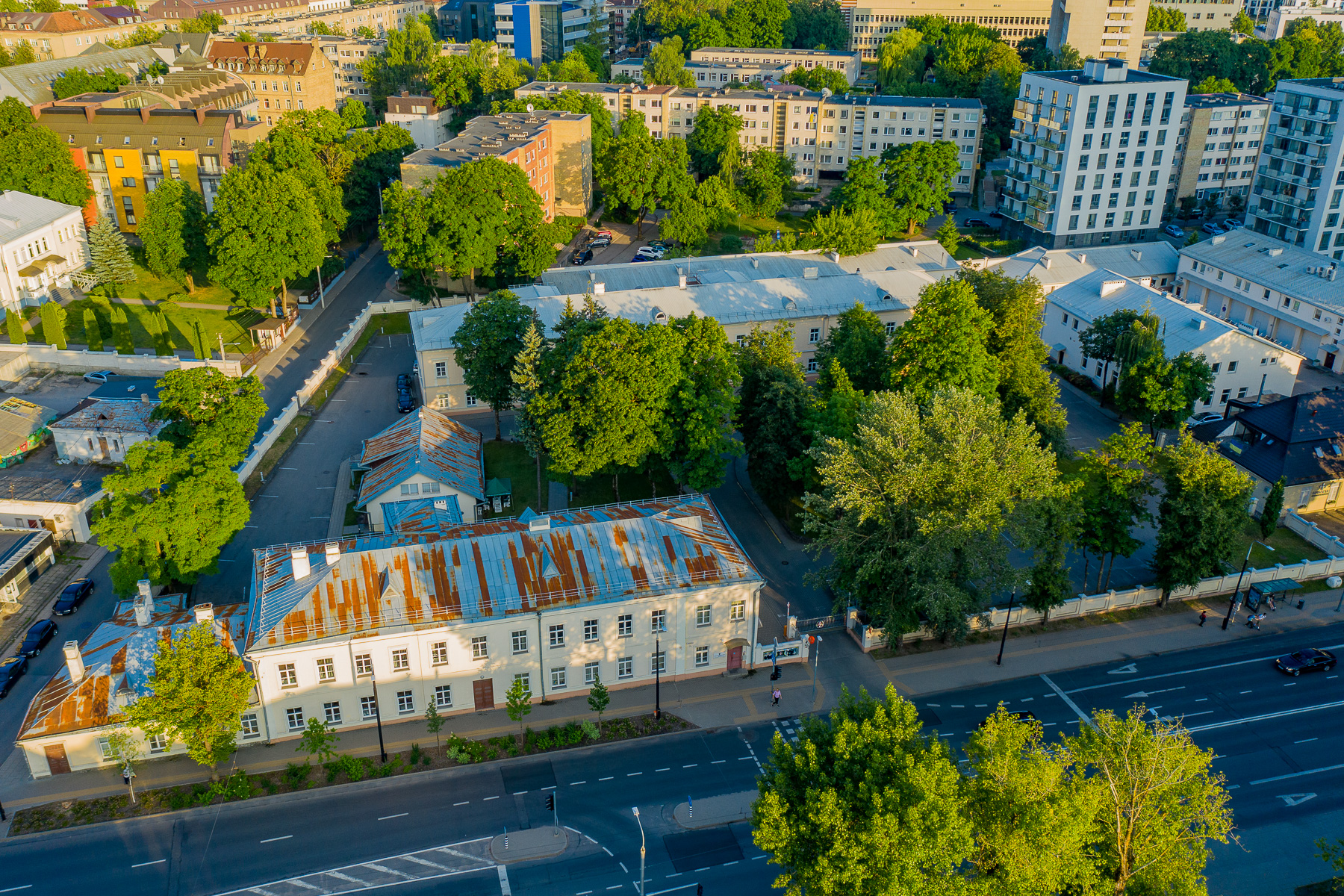
Headquarters

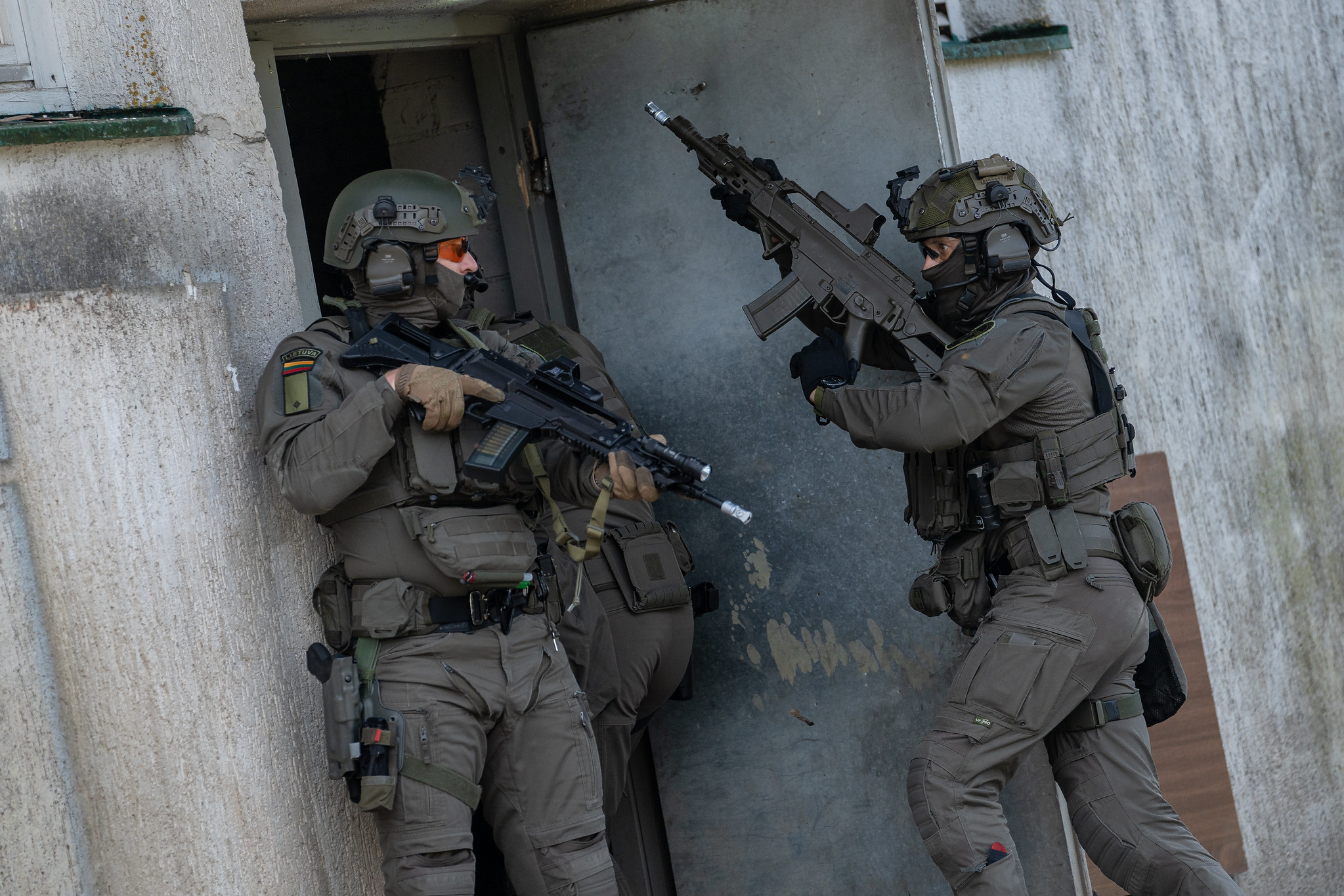
SPS operators on the assault exercise

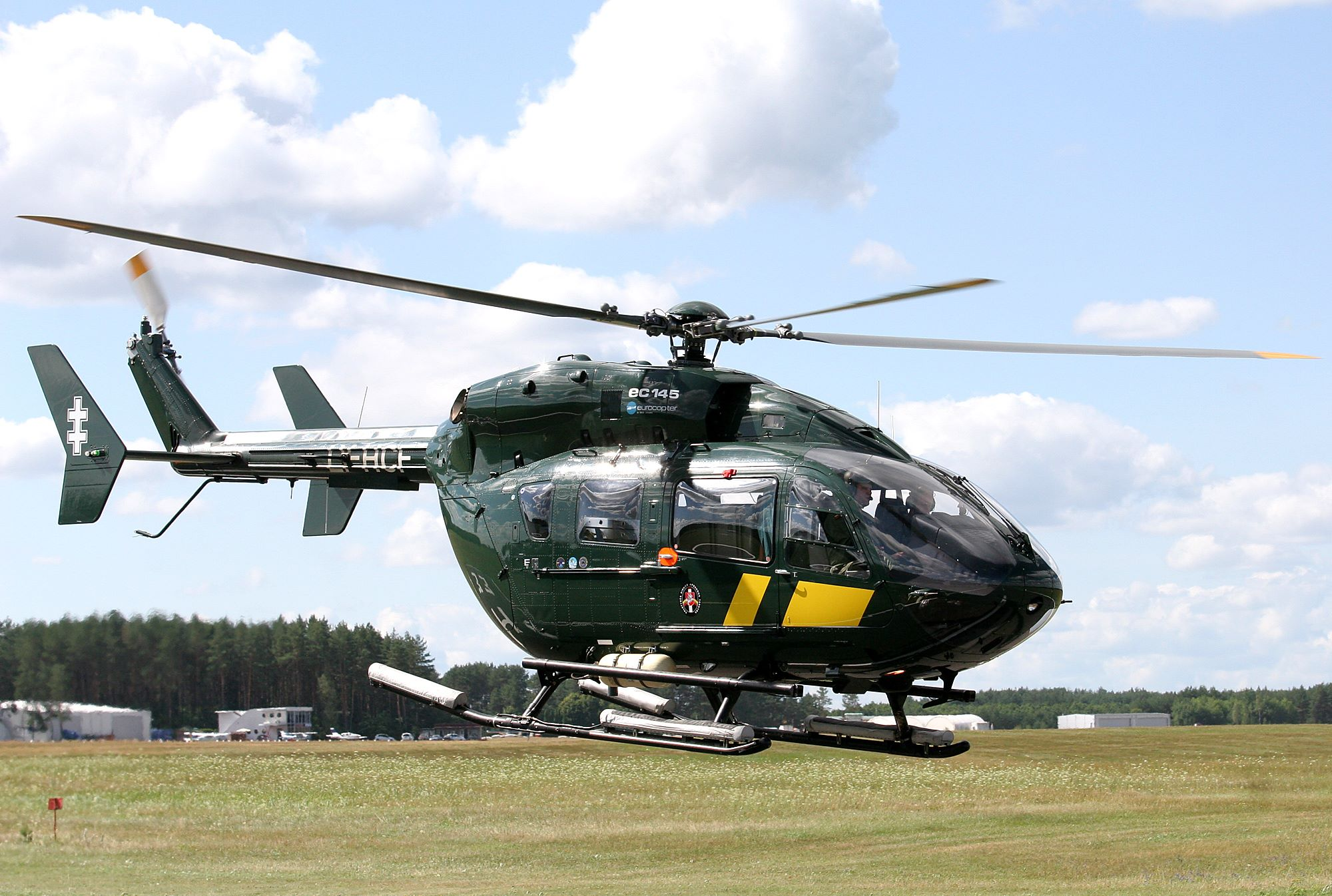
Eurocopter EC145 of the Aviation Unit

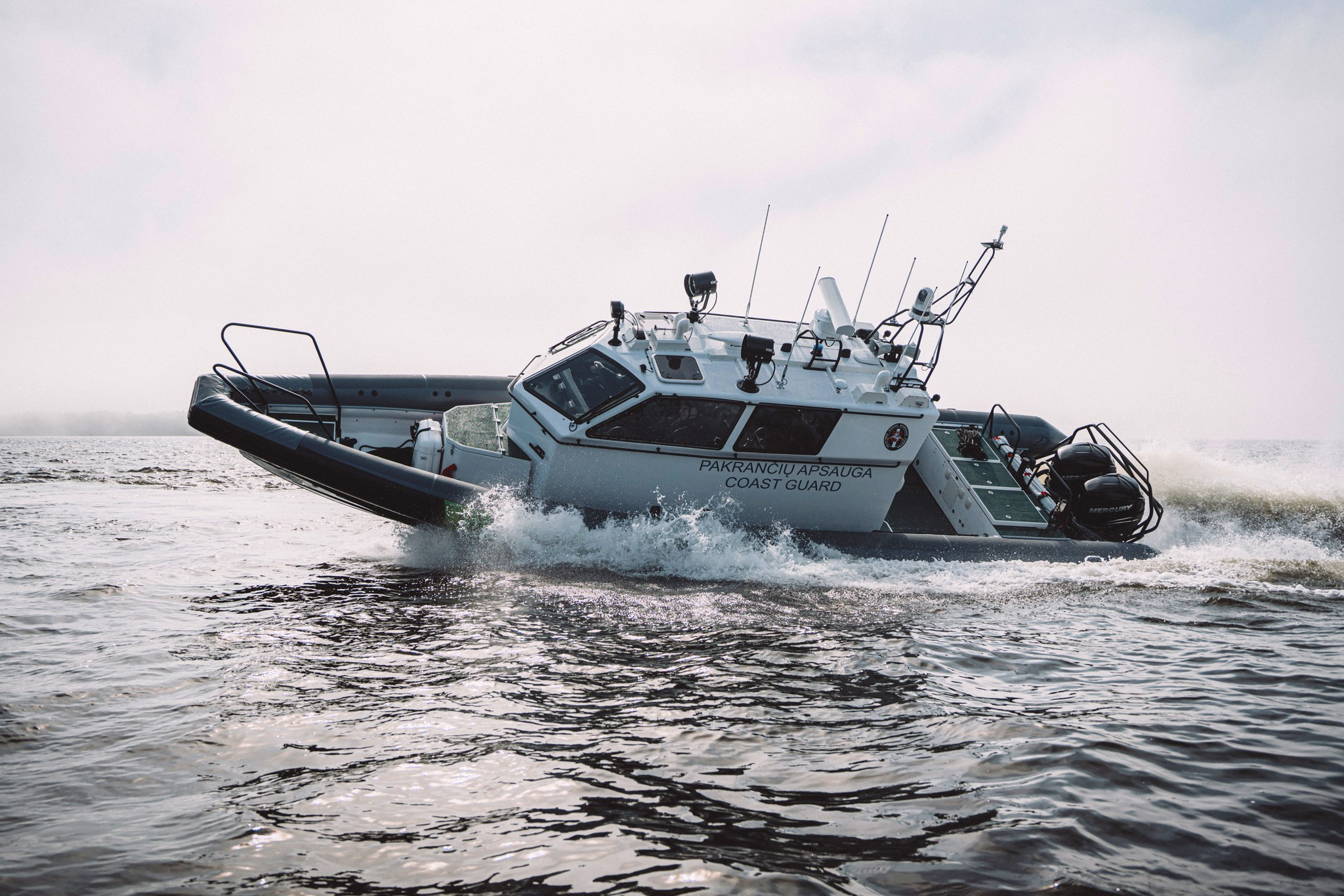
Boomeranger C-1100 C in the coast guard service

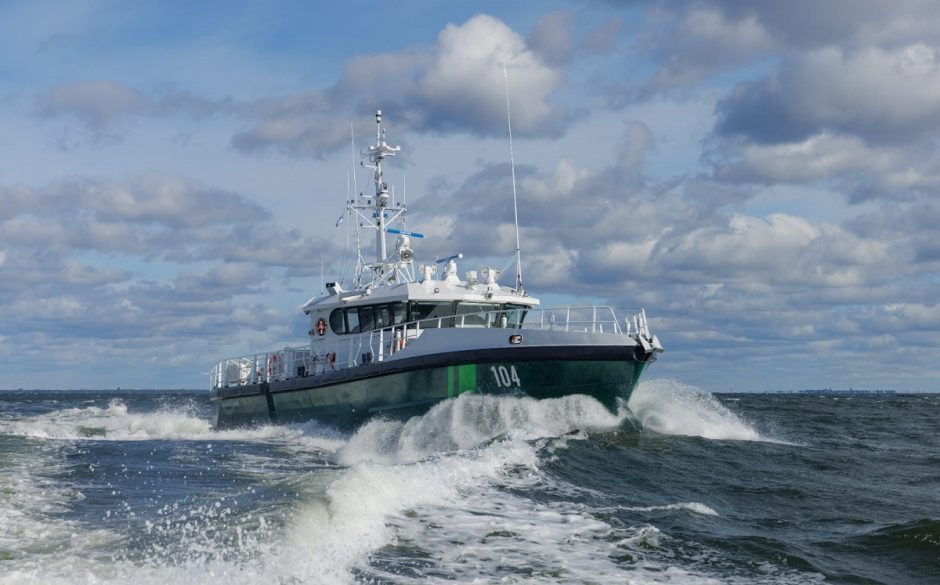
Patrol cutter "Gintaras Žagunis"

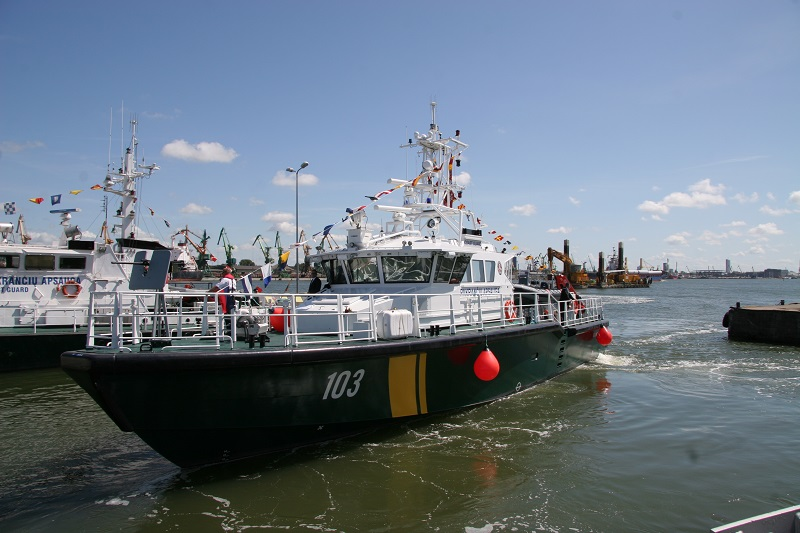
Patrol cutter "Aleksandras Barauskas"

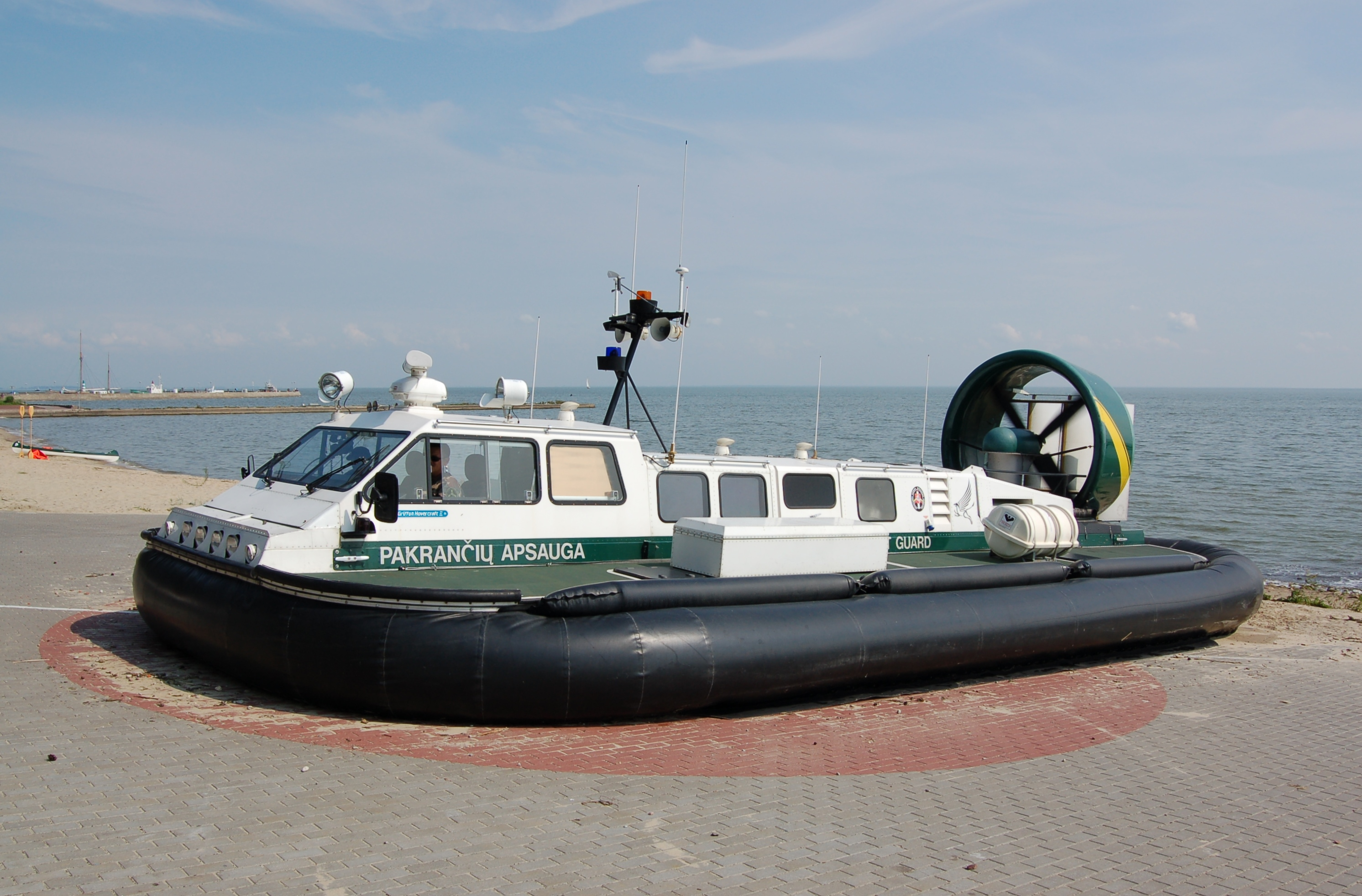
Griffon 2000TD hovercraft used for coast guard

== See also ==
- Customs Department (Lithuania)
- Military of Lithuania
- European Border and Coast Guard Agency
