= Krakūnai =

- Village
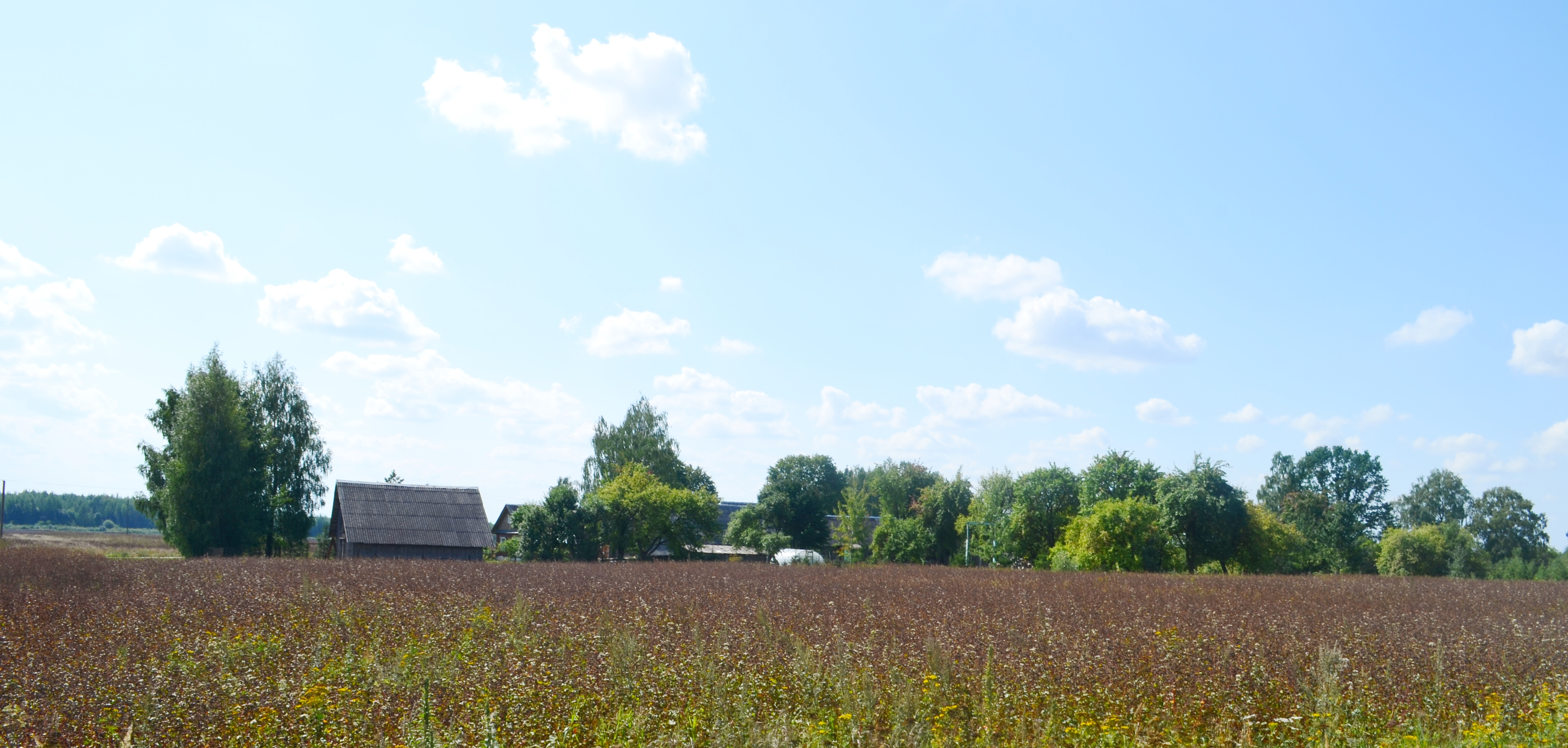
- Krakūnai village

- Location of Krakūnai
- Coordinates: 54°09′N 25°37′E
- Country: Lithuania
- County: Vilnius County
- Municipality: Šalčininkai district municipality
- Eldership: Dieveniškės eldership

Population (2011)
  - Total: 86
- Time zone: UTC+2 (EET)
  - Summer (DST): UTC+3 (EEST)

Krakūnai is a village in Lithuania on the border with Belarus. It was mentioned as early as 1433 when Jonas Goštautas received Dieveniškės and 26 surrounding villages from Grand Duke Sigismund Kęstutaitis. The village had 302 residents in 1931, 283 in 1959, 249 in 1970, and 215 in 1979. According to the 2011 census, it had 86 residents. On 19 May 1991 Lithuanian border patrol officer Gintaras Žagunis was killed in the village by Soviet OMON forces. It was the first deadly assault on a Lithuanian border post. A five-meter tall monument in his memory was erected in 2004, in the west part of the village.
