= Lavoriškės =

Lavoriškės Ławaryszki
- Village
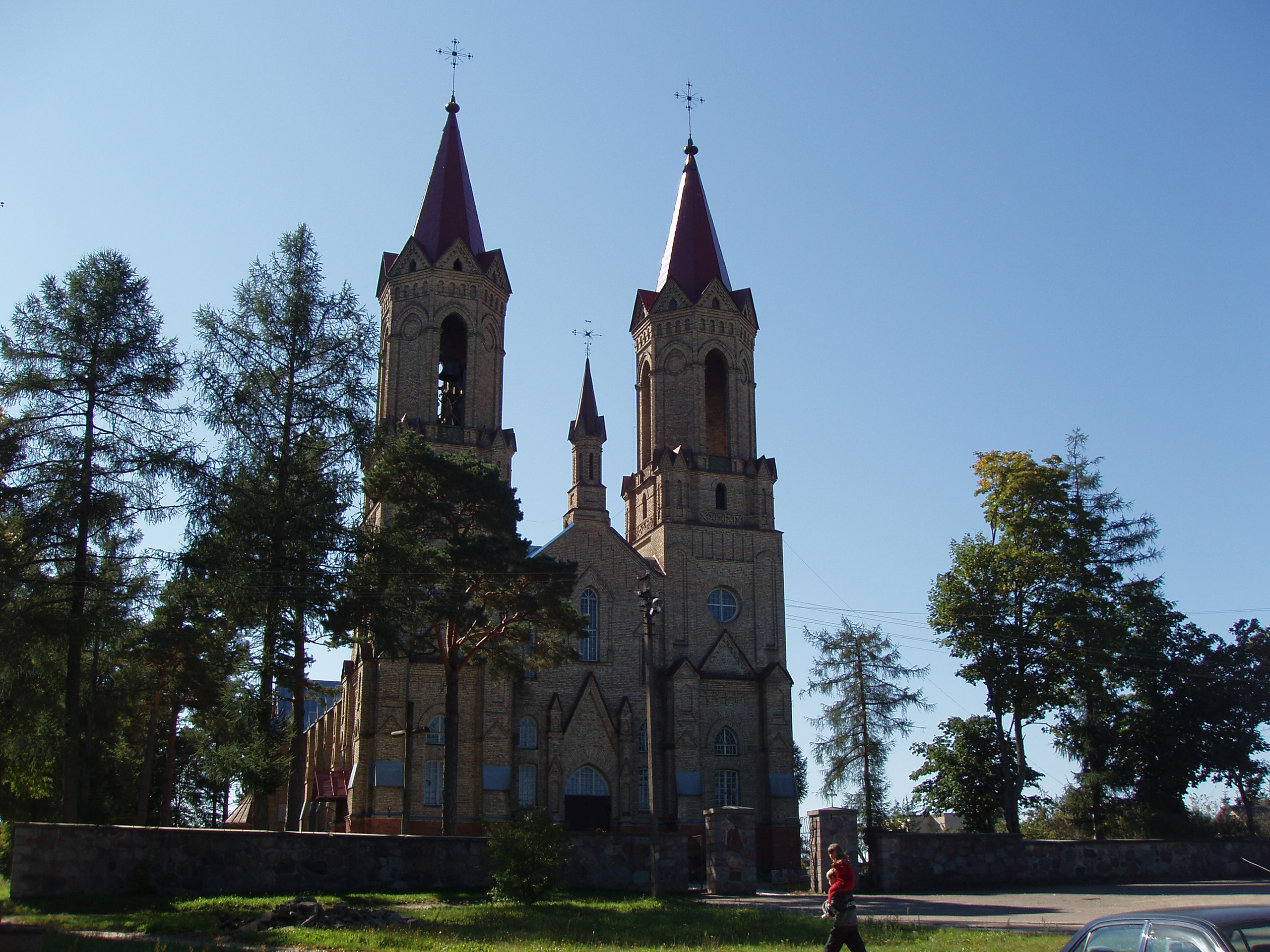
- Church of Lavoriškės

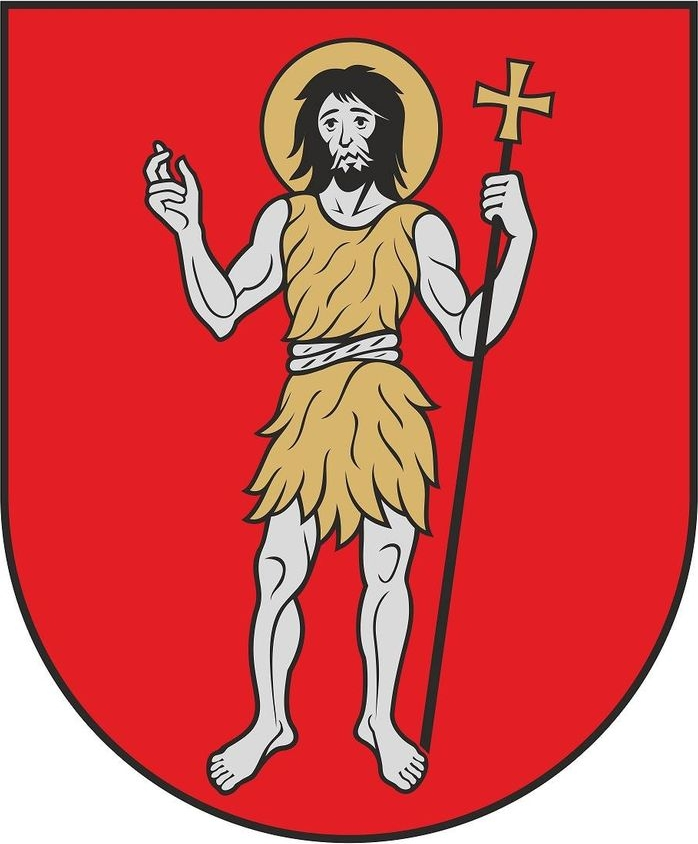
- Coat of arms

- Location of Lavoriškės
- Coordinates: 54°42′29″N 25°38′20″E
- Country: Lithuania
- County: Vilnius County
- Municipality: Vilnius district municipality
- Eldership: Lavoriškės Eldership
- Capital of: Lavoriškės Eldership

Population (2021)
  - Total: 522
- Time zone: UTC+2 (EET)
  - Summer (DST): UTC+3 (EEST)

Lavoriškės is a village in the Vilnius district municipality, Lithuania, it is located about 15 kilometres (9.3 mi) east of Vilnius city municipality, very close to the border with Belarus. According to the 2011 census, it had population of 621.
