= Papelekis =

- Village
- Interactive map of Papelekis
- Location of Papelekis
- Coordinates: 55°04′56″N 26°15′24″E
- Country: Lithuania
- County: Vilnius County
- Municipality: Švenčionys District Municipality
- Time zone: UTC+2 (EET)
  - Summer (DST): UTC+3 (EEST)

Papelekis is a village in the Švenčionys District Municipality. The village is located near the border with Belarus, and the external European Union border post stands to the east.
