= Treaty of the Reestablishment of the Latvia–Lithuania border (1993) =

- Signed: 29 June 1993
- Location: Biržai, Lithuania
- Effective: 5 July 1995
- Languages: Lithuanian, Latvian

Treaty of the Reestablishment of the Latvia–Lithuania border (Lithuanian: Lietuvos Respublikos ir Latvijos Respublikos sutartis dėl valstybės sienos atstatymo) was signed on 29 June 1993 between Lithuania and Latvia. The Latvia–Lithuania border was reestablished based on the Treaty of Latvia–Lithuania border of 1921, which was valid until 15 June 1940, i.e. the date of Soviet occupation.
