= Latvia–Lithuania border =

International border

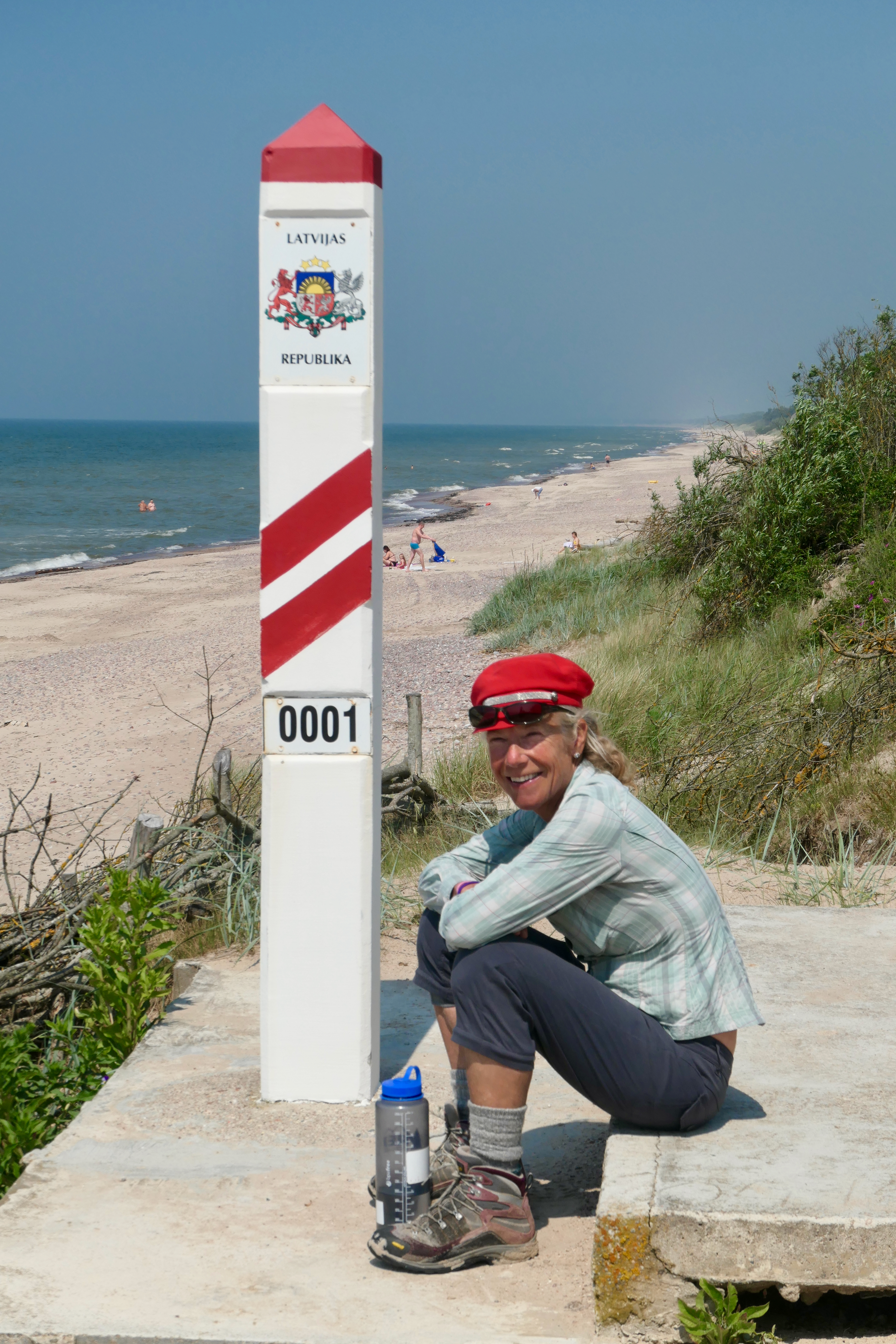
- Border marker in Latvia

Characteristics
- Entities: Latvia Lithuania
- Length: 610.3 km (379.2 mi), including the 22.2 km (13.8 mi) sea border

History
- Established: 30 March 1921 and 1991
- Treaties: Treaty of the Reestablishment of the Latvia–Lithuania border (1993)

The Latvia–Lithuania border is the state border between the Republic of Latvia and the Republic of Lithuania. The length of the land border is 588.1 km (365.4 mi) with additional 22.2 km (13.8 mi) of sea border. It is an internal border of the European Union and the Schengen Area.

The border starts from the triple junction of the borders with Belarus to the north of Lake Drūkšiai (55°40′50.17″N 26°37′49.79″E) and stretches to the coast of the Baltic Sea, where it ends between Palanga and Rucava. For 30 km (19 mi) the border follows the Šventoji River.

== History ==
Latvian and Lithuanian boundary markers

The border started to exist after the Battle of Saule on 22 September 1236 and then was later solidified after the Battle of Durbe on 13 July 1260. There were some disputes on the exact location of the border but these were settled. Later, for centuries, it was an approximate boundary between the Grand Duchy of Lithuania and Livonia. Following the Great Northern War and, separately, the partitions of the Polish-Lithuanian Commonwealth, the border became partially defunct when the territories were incorporated into the Russian Empire.

The de facto border was re-established following the independence of both countries in 1918. The Treaty of Latvia-Lithuania border was signed on 30 March 1921 and the land border demarcation was carried out during the 1929–1930. Following the Soviet occupation of the Baltic states, it became an internal state border. The international border was restored in 1991, following the restoration of Lithuanian and Latvian independence. After prolonged negotiations, in July 1999, the border between the territorial waters was drawn as a straight line between 56°04′08.9″N 21°03′51.47″E and 56°02′43.5″N 20°42′35.0″E.

== Border crossing ==
There were border checkpoints between the countries between 1991 and 2007. They are now abandoned, since both nations joined the Schengen Area in December 2007, allowing unrestricted border crossing.

== Gallery ==
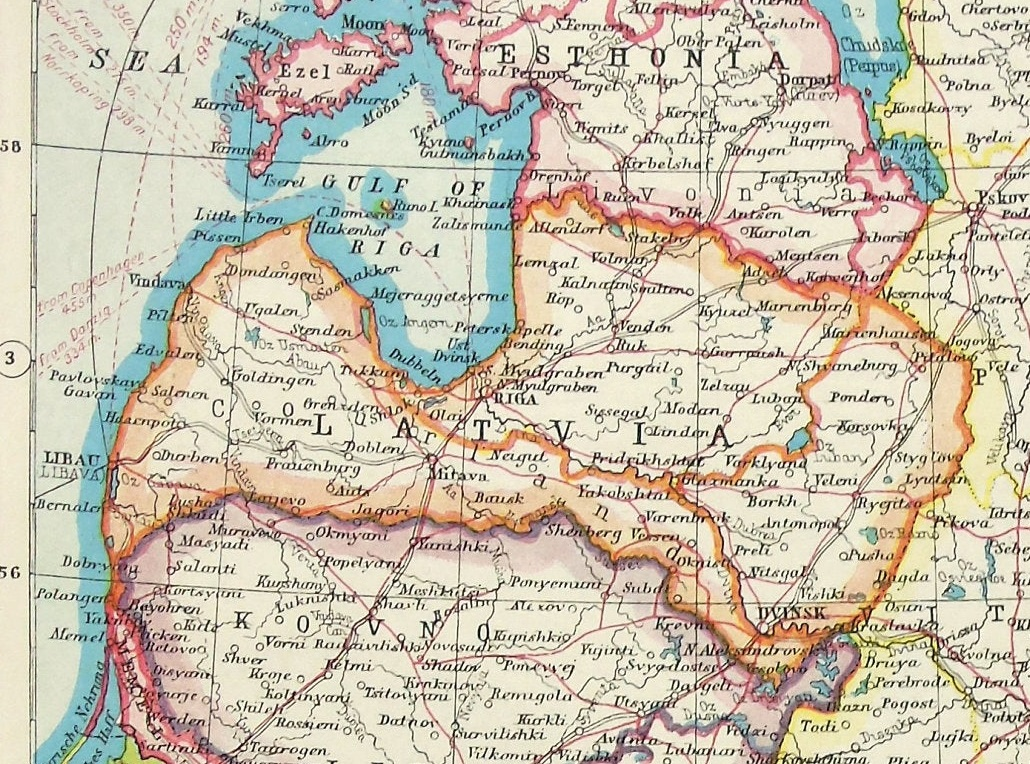
Map of Latvia before the final demarcation of the borders with Palanga, 1920

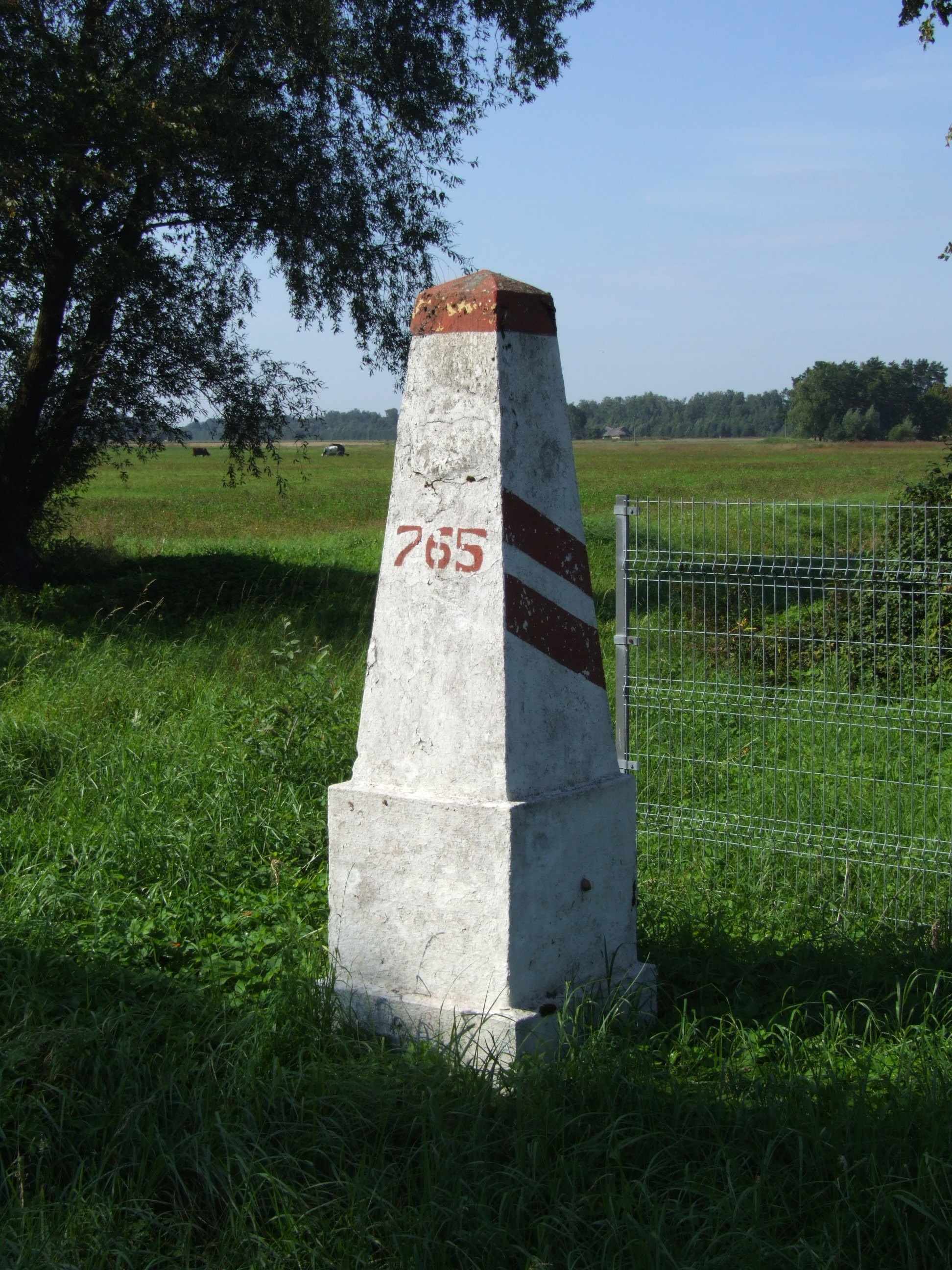
Border post on the Lithuanian-Latvian border

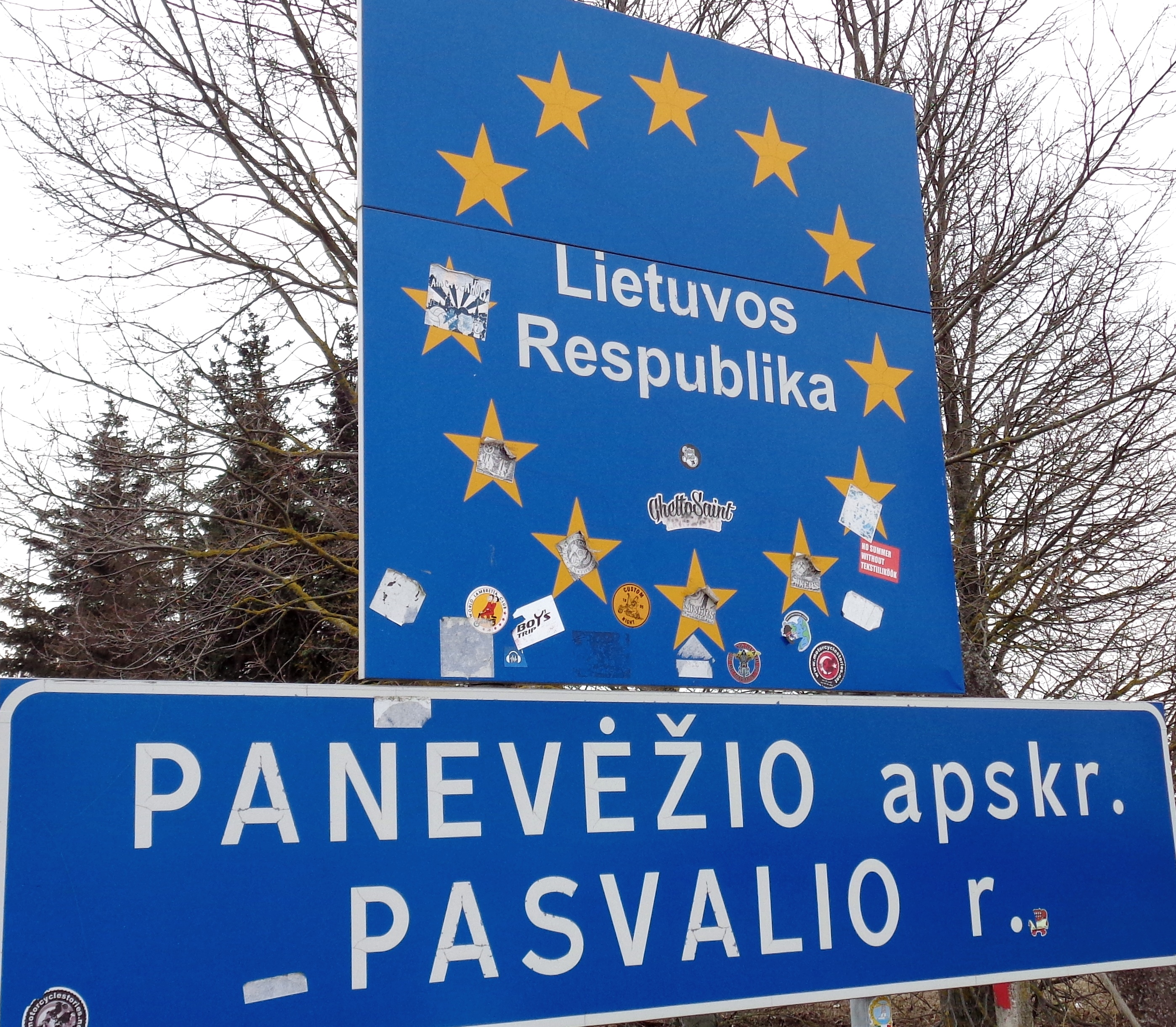
Lithuanian Border Sign near Šalnaičiai

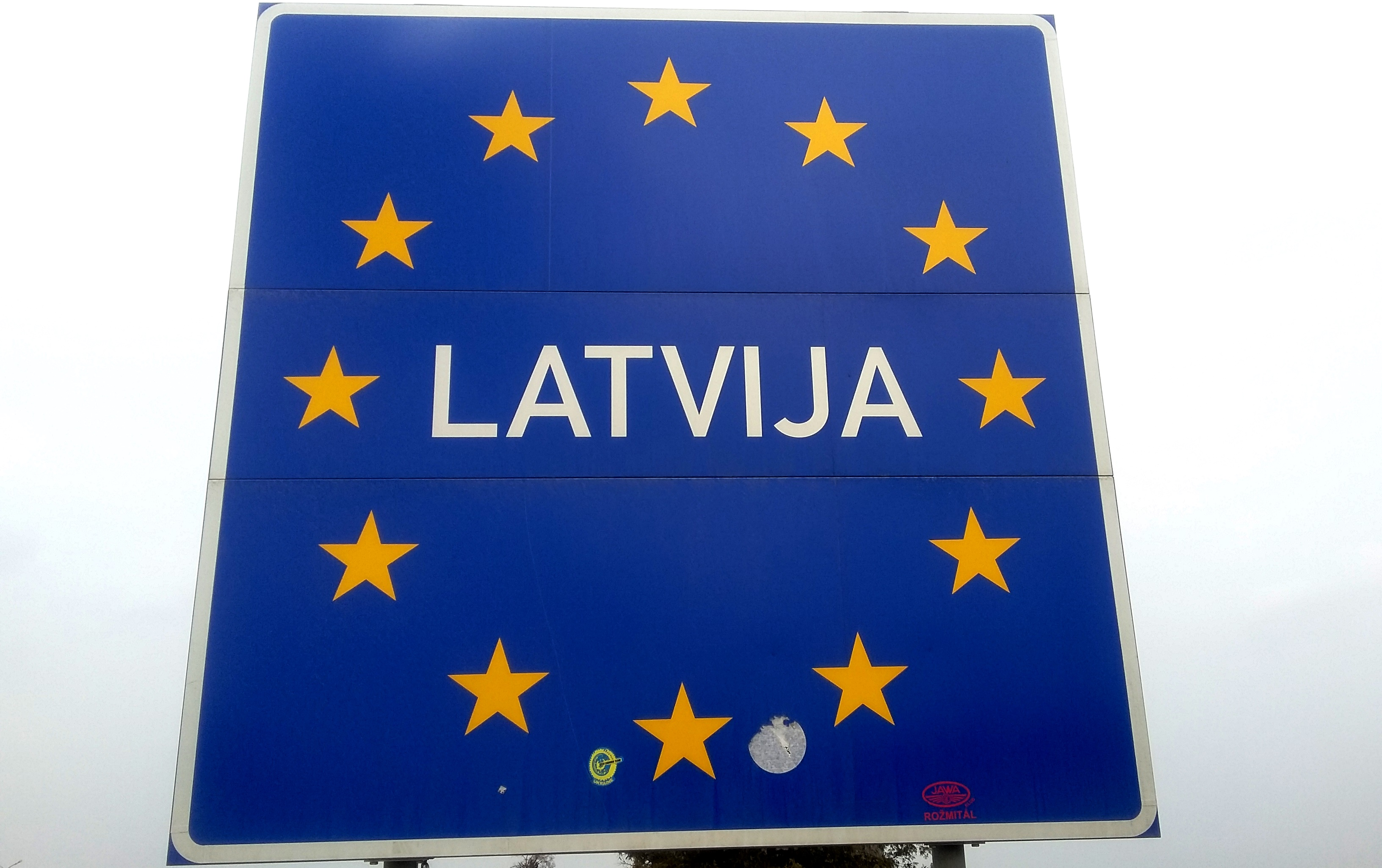
Latvian Border Sign near Grenctāle

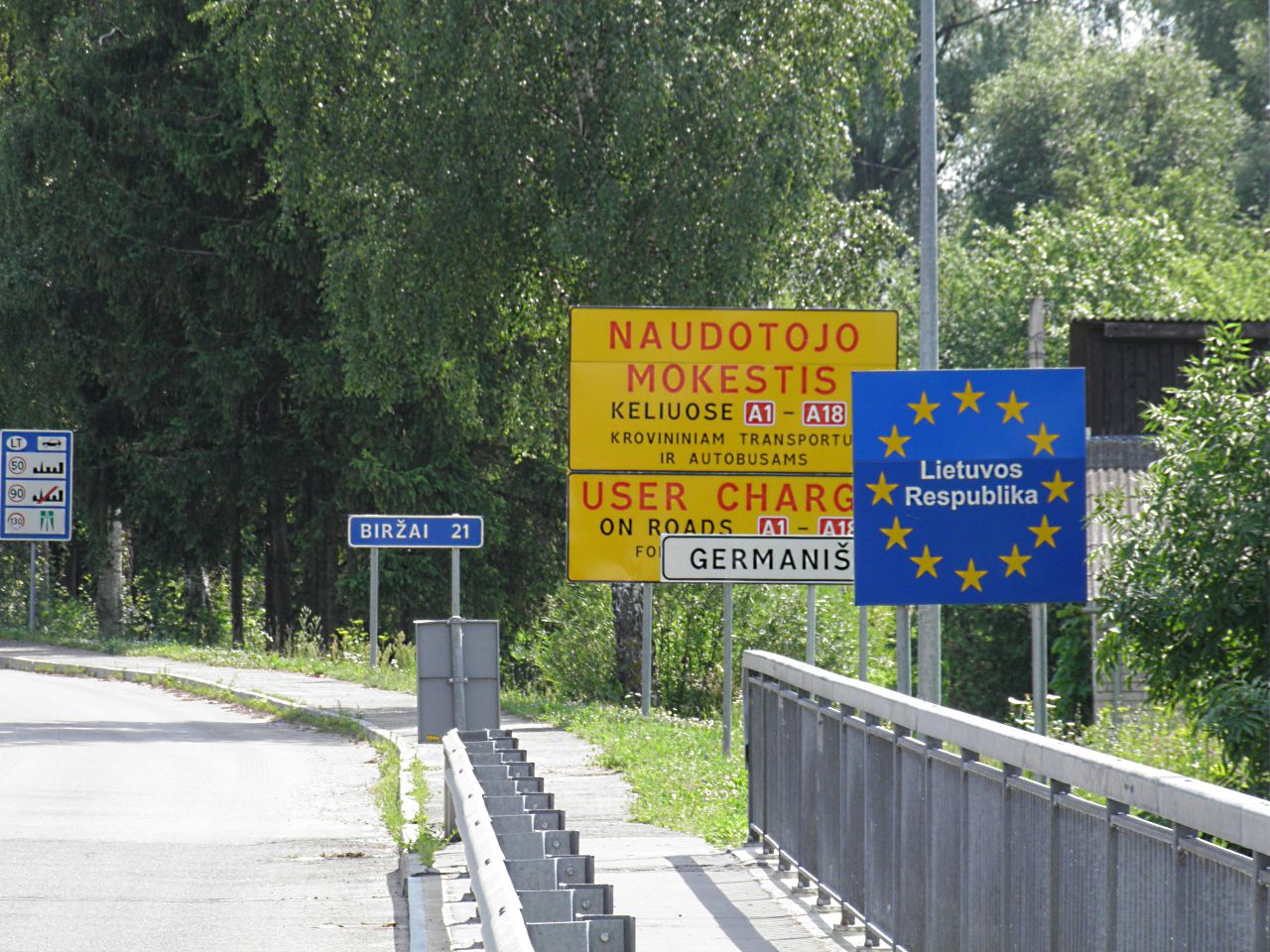
Entry into Lithuania at Germaniškis
