= Balžis =

Lake in Vilnius, Lithuania

Lake Balžis
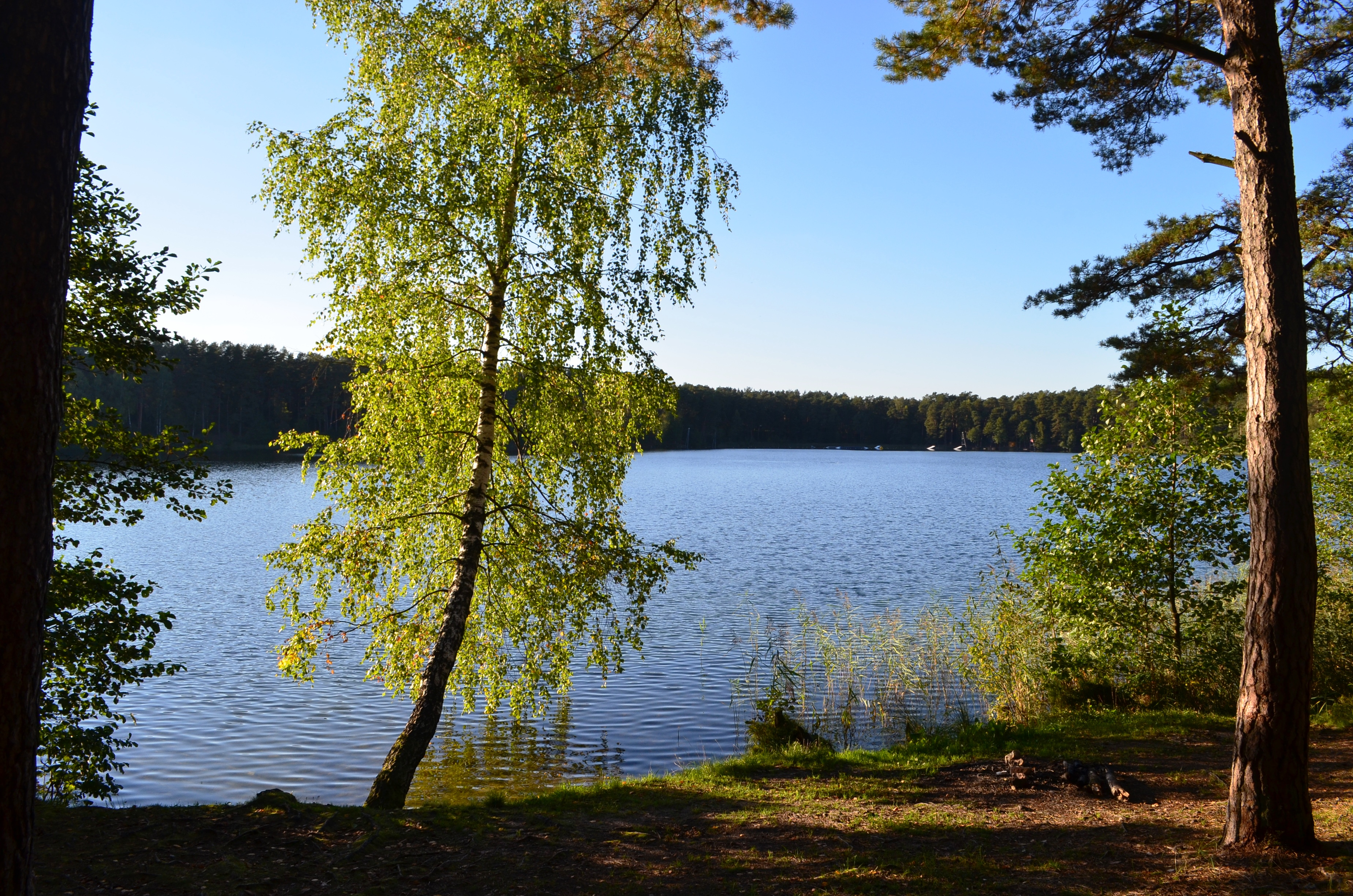
- Lake Balžis from the eastern shore

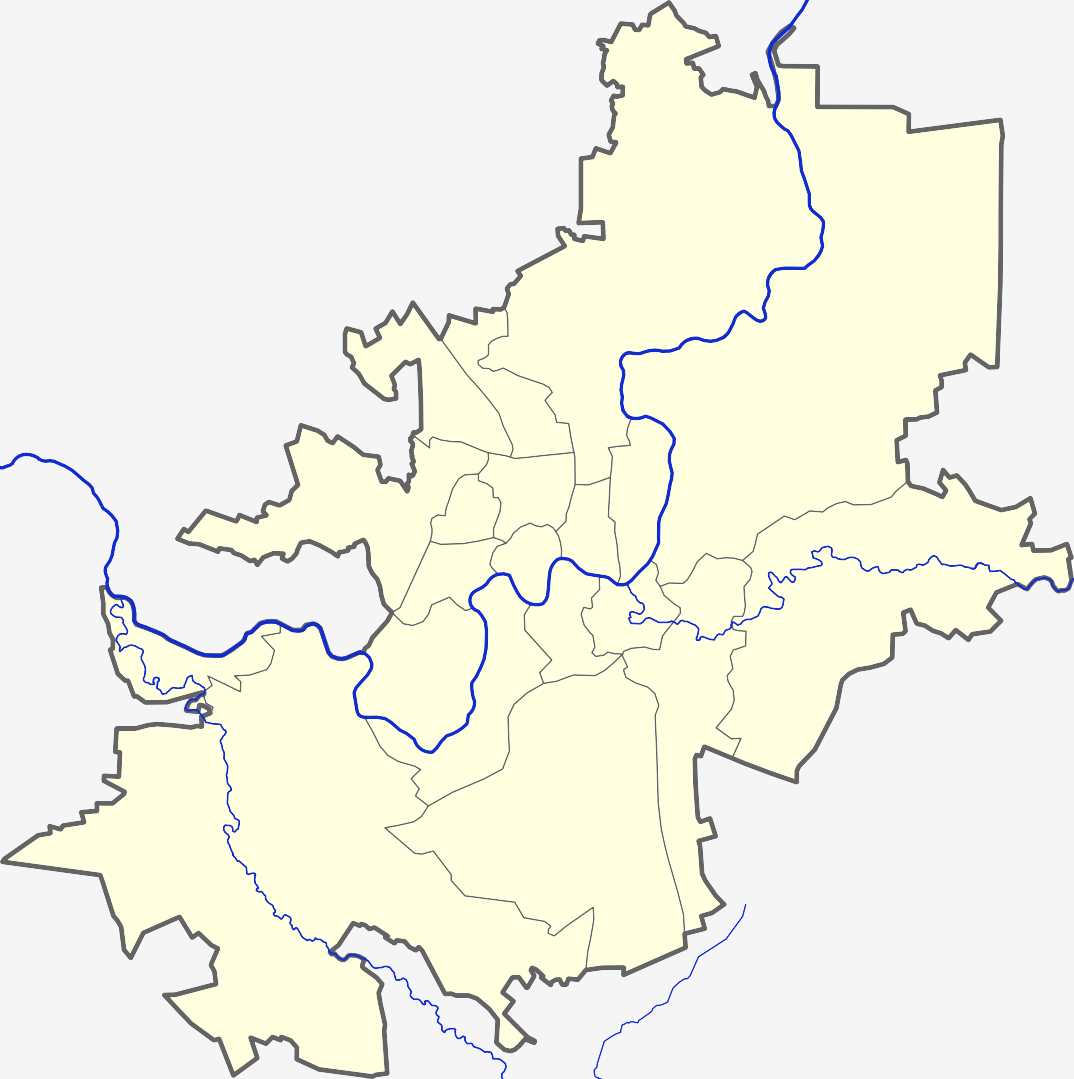
- Location within Vilnius
- Location: Vilnius city municipality
- Coordinates: 54.789°N 25.434°E
- Primary inflows: 1 rivulet (from Juodis)
- Primary outflows: 1 rivulet (to Skarbelis)
- Catchment area: Neris
- Basin countries: Lithuania
- Max. length: 0.8 km (0.50 mi)
- Max. width: 0.4 km (0.25 mi)
- Surface area: 0.2 km^{2} (0.077 sq mi)
- Average depth: 11.5 m (38 ft)
- Max. depth: 27.1 m (89 ft)
- Shore length^{1}: 2.2 km (1.4 mi)
- ^{1} Shore length is not a well-defined measure.

Balžis is a lake in the north-eastern part of Vilnius City Municipality, Lithuania. It is surrounded by Nemenčinė-Lavoriškės pine forests. Its coasts are quite high, dry. Balžis is connected to Lake Juodis and Lake Skarbelis by small rivulets. The lake belongs to the Neris River basin.

Lake Balžis is a popular recreation place for Vilnius inhabitants. In Soviet times, pioneer camp was located at the coast of the lake. Now Šilas city district is located around the lake.

The name of the lake balžis comes from the word balžas which means "serene, clear, bright".

== Sources ==
- Zinkus, Jonas; et al., eds. (1988). "Balžis". Tarybų Lietuvos enciklopedija (in Lithuanian). Vol. 1. Vilnius: Vyriausioji enciklopedijų redakcija. p. 249.
- Vanagas, Aleksandras (1981). Lietuvių hidronimų etimologinis žodynas (in Lithuanian). Vilnius: Mokslas.
