= Lake Yedigei =

Lake in Belarus

- Возера Ёдзі (Belarusian)
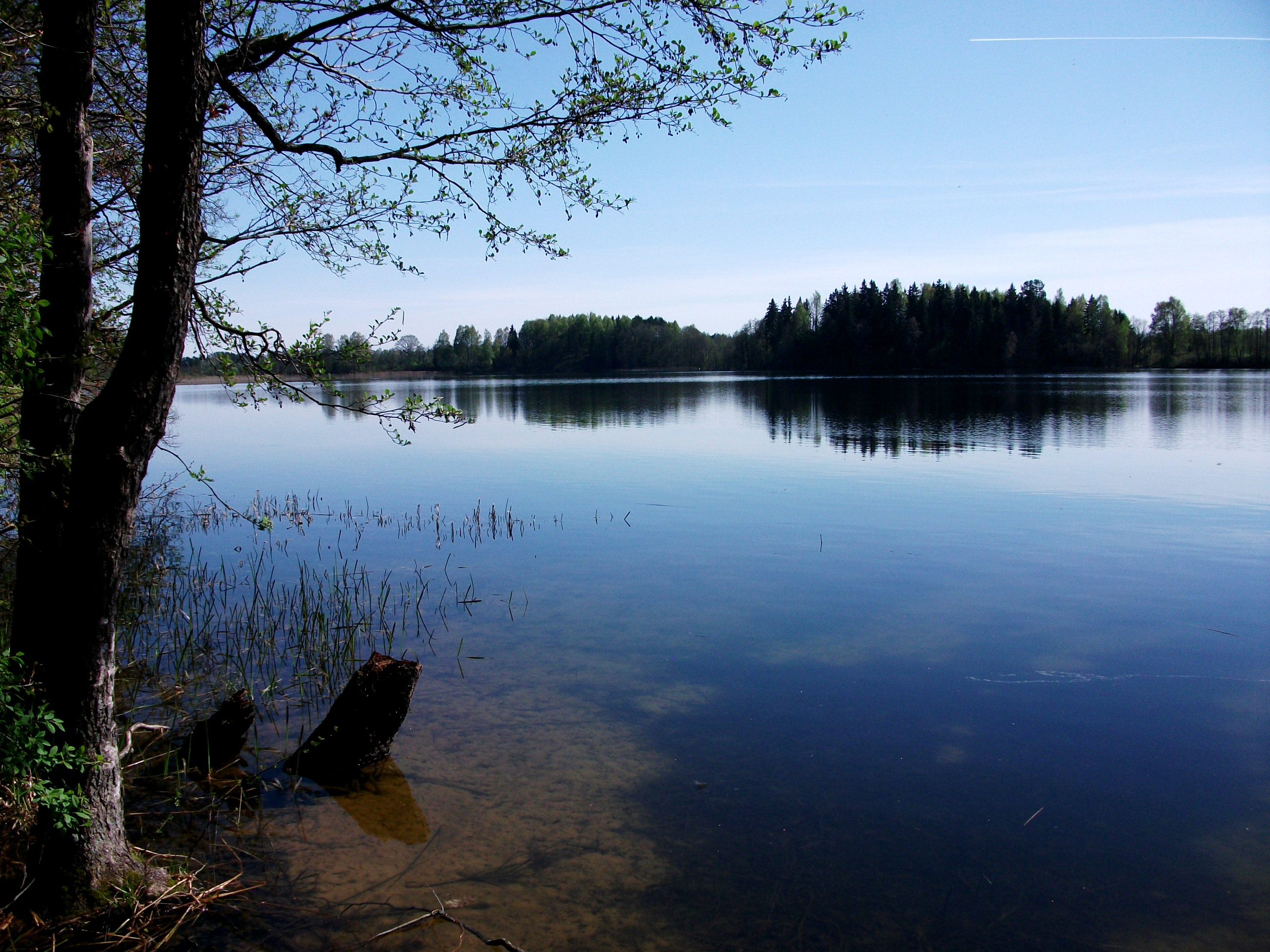

- Location within Belarus
- Location: Belarus
- Coordinates: 54°48′N 26°18′E
- Max. width: 0.52 kilometres (0.32 mi)
- Surface area: 0.61 square kilometres (0.24 sq mi)
- Max. depth: 19.7 metres (65 ft)
- Water volume: 4,840,000 cubic metres (171,000,000 cu ft)
- Shore length^{1}: 3.74 kilometres (2.32 mi)
- ^{1} Shore length is not a well-defined measure.

Lake Yedigei (Belarusian: Возера Ёдзі) is a lake in Belarus, located in 33 km northeast of the borough of Ostrowiec, near the village of Yedigei.

The lake is located in the Stracha River basin. Yedigei is a small lake, with a surface area of 0.61 square kilometres (0.24 sq mi). The greatest depth of the lake is 19.7 metres (65 ft), with a maximum width of 0.52 kilometres (0.32 mi). The volume of water in the lake is 4,840,000 cubic metres (171,000,000 cu ft). The lake's coastline measures 3.74 kilometres (2.32 mi), and its water catchment area is 4.4 square kilometres (1.7 sq mi).
