= Oksna (river) =

River in Grodno Region, Belarus

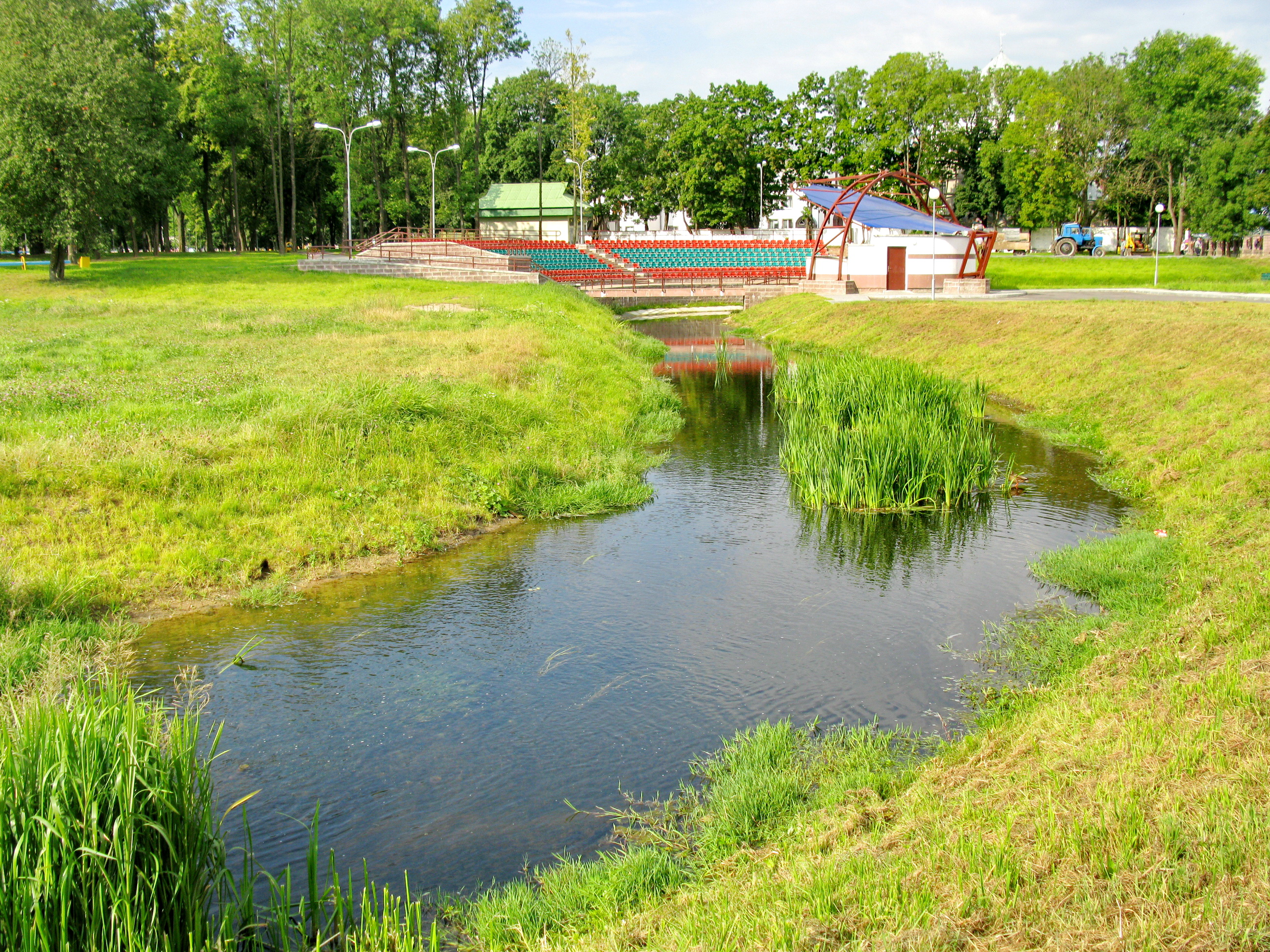
- River Oksna in the city of Smarhoń
- Native name: Оксна (Belarusian)

Location
- Country: Belarus

Physical characteristics
- Source
  - location: Hrodna Region
- Mouth: Vilija
  - coordinates: 54°30′25″N 26°26′29″E
- Length: 20 km (12 mi)
- Basin size: 104 km^{2} (40 sq mi)

Oksna (Belarusan: Оксна, Oksna) is a river in Belarus, the left tributary of the Vilija River (Neman Basin). It flows in the Smarhoń district of the Grodno Region. The length is 20 km. The catchment area is 104 km^{2}. The average slope of the water surface is 4.8 ‰. The main tributary is the Hiarviatka River.

It begins near the village of Hlinny, flows through the Ašmiany upland, through the city of Smarhoń, and flows into the Vilija northwest of the village of Pieravozy.
