= Ashmyany =

Town in Grodno Region, Belarus

Ashmyany Ашмяны (Belarusian) Ошмяны (Russian) Oshmyany
- Town
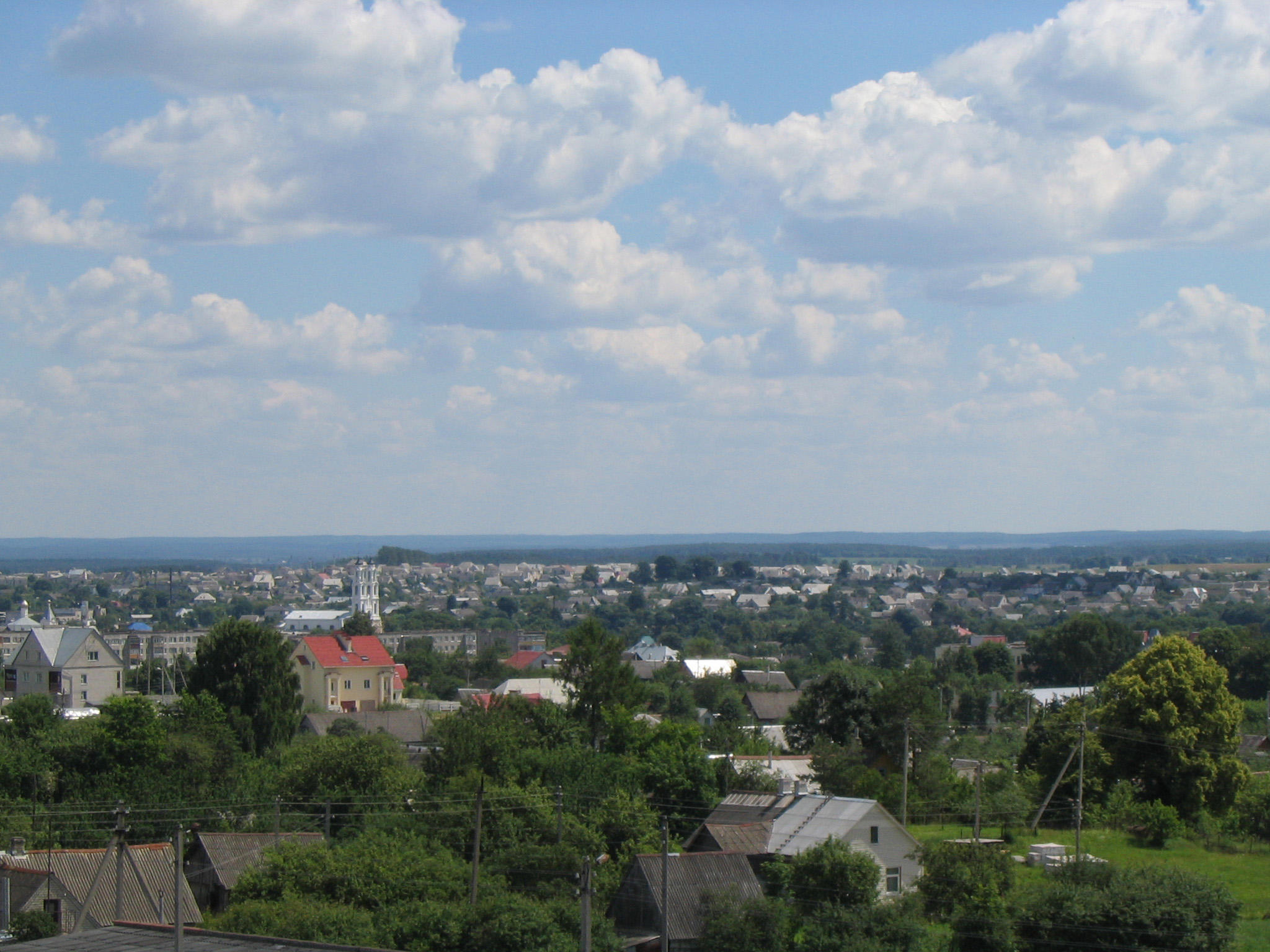
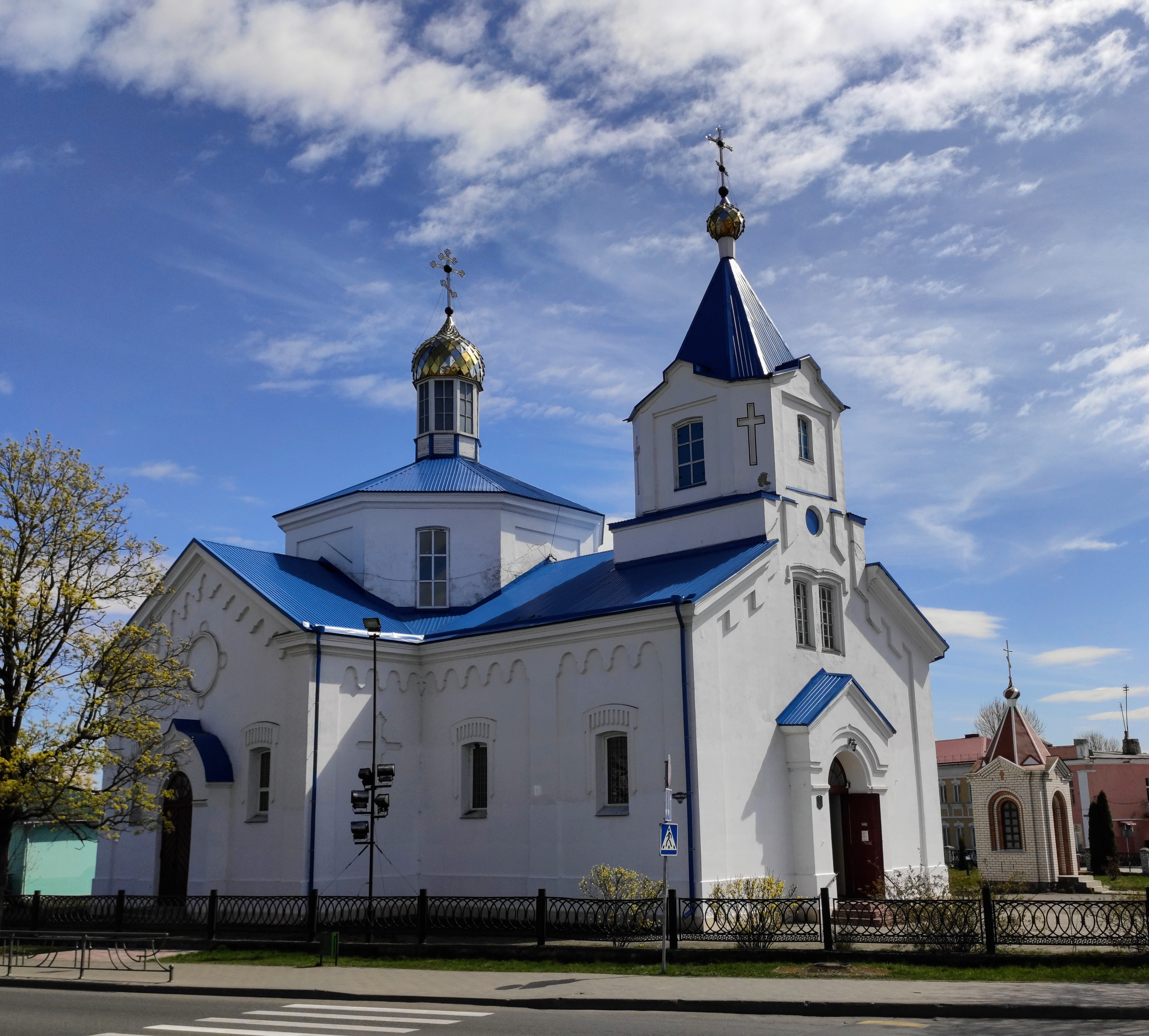
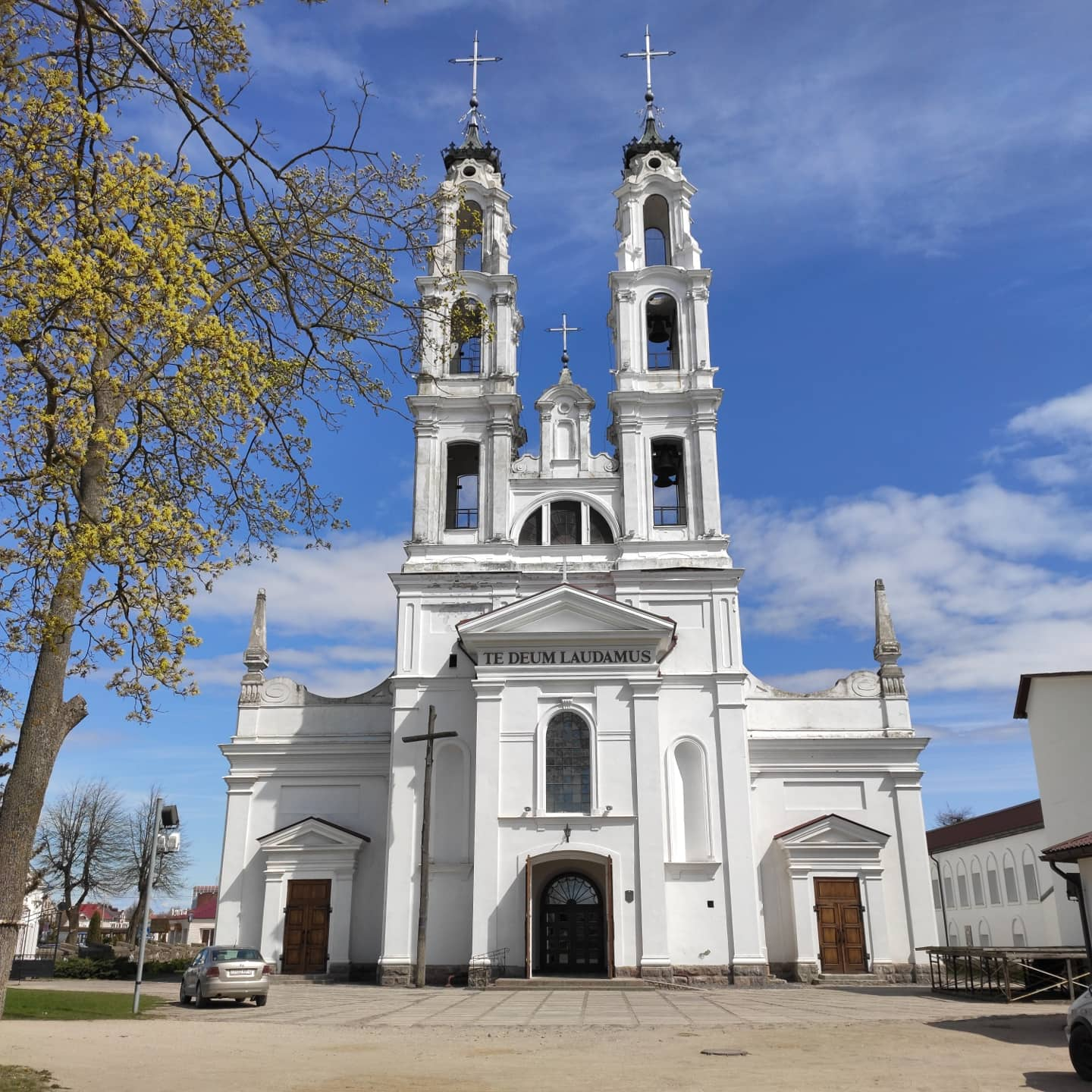
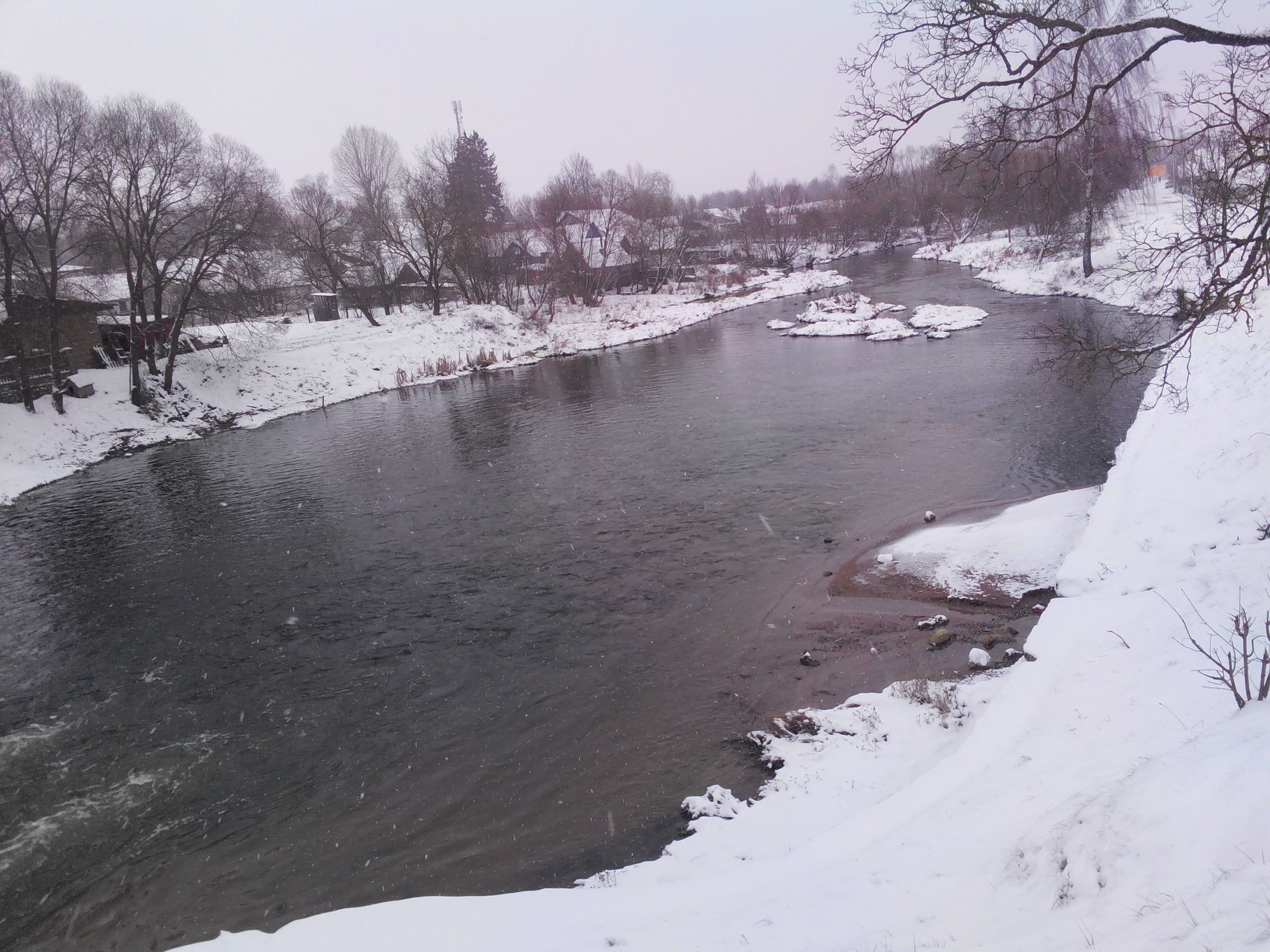
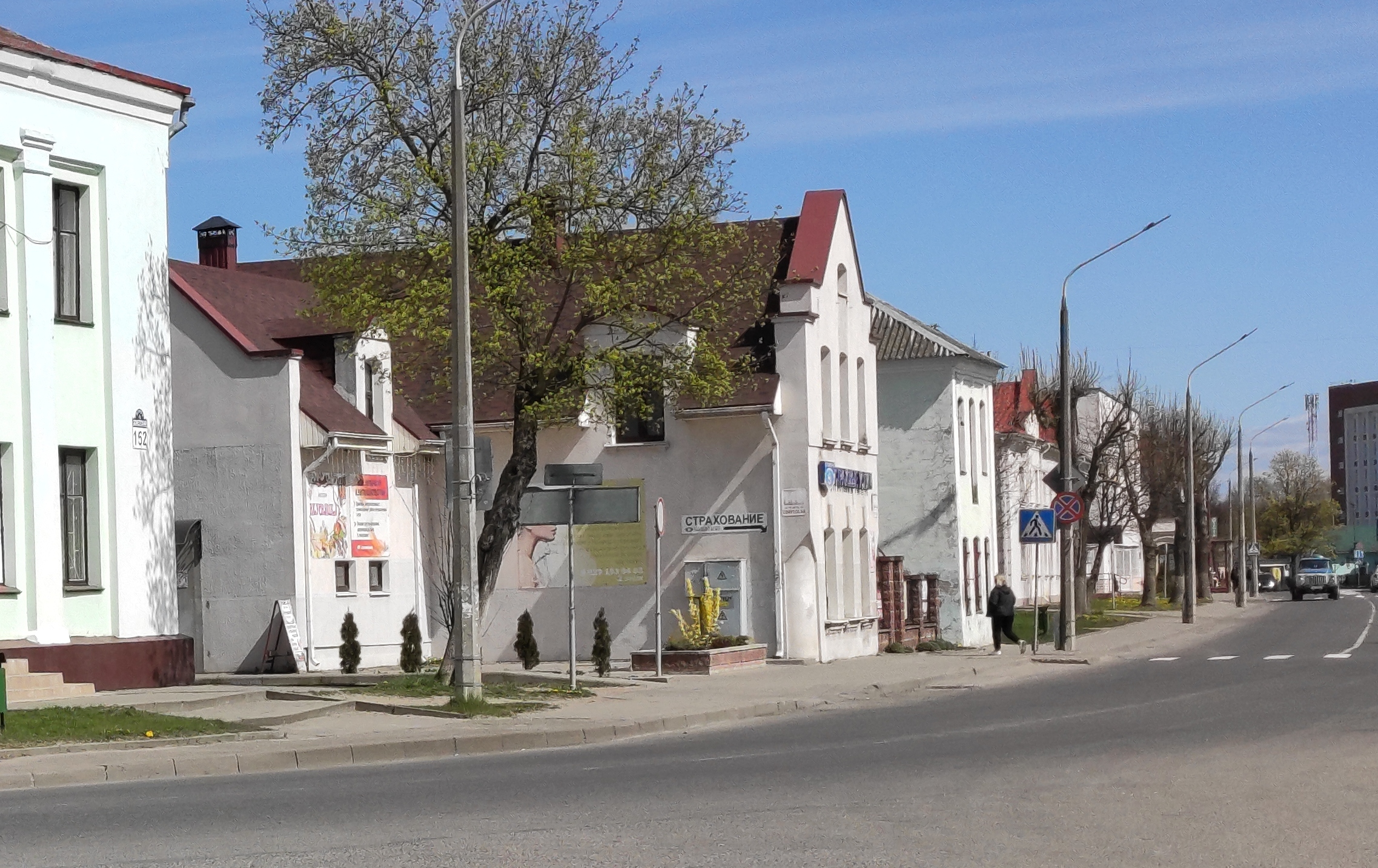
- Panorama of Ashmyany Orthodox Church of the Resurrection Catholic Church of St. Michael the Archangel Ashmyanka River Old buildings in Soviet Street

- Flag Coat of arms

- Location within Belarus Location within Europe
- Coordinates: 54°25′30″N 25°56′15″E
- Country: Belarus
- Region: Grodno Region
- District: Ashmyany District

Population (2025)
  - Total: 16,804
- Time zone: UTC+3 (MSK)
- Website: oshmiany.gov.by

Ashmyany or Oshmyany (Note: Belarusian: Ашмяны, romanized: Ašmiany; Russian: Ошмяны, romanized: Oshmyany; Lithuanian: Ašmena; Polish: Oszmiana; Yiddish: אָשמענע, romanized: Oshmene.) is a city in Grodno Region, Belarus. It is located 50 kilometres (31 mi) from Vilnius in Lithuania, and serves as the administrative center of Ashmyany District. The river Ashmyanka passes through the city. As of 2025, it has a population of 16,804.

== Name ==
Since time immemorial, Ašmena and its surroundings were ethnic Lithuanian territory. However, many of the indigenous inhabitants died out during the wars, famine and plague in the late 17th and the early 18th centuries, and the Belarusian population replaced them. Lithuanians were slavicized along the Minsk-Ašmena-Vilnius axis, and by the mid-19th century, the numbers of Lithuanian-speakers had severely decreased.

Presently, its Lithuanian past is sealed in the towns's name, which is of Lithuanian origin. The town's name is derived from the name of the Ašmena (modern Ashmyanka River), itself derived from the Lithuanian word akmuo (stone). The link between consonants š and k is old and present in the Lithuanian words, respectively ašmuo (sharp blade) and akmuo (stone). The present name Ashmyany uses the plural form of the name and is a modern invention. Through the ancient town's history, its name was recorded in the Lithuanian singular form. Lithuanian papers ignore other findings by historians, such as those of Polish historian Zbysław Wojtkowiak. This historian's findings, based on archival data, indicate that in the 15th and 16th centuries, Ashmyana and its surrounding areas were contrasted with Lithuanian lands (located to the west) and referred to as 'the lands of Ruthenia.' This means that the ethnically Ruthenian element predominated in the Ashmyana area. Polish papers note already in the mid–15th century sources mention the Slavic name of the town, i.e. Oszmiana (hominisque na Rusi et Oszmiana).

== History ==
=== Grand Duchy of Lithuania ===
Ašmena is mentioned first as a town in the Duchy of Vilnius in the 1350s. The first reliable mention of Ašmena is in the Lithuanian Chronicles, which tells that after Gediminas' death in 1341, Jaunutis inherited the town. In 1384, the Teutonic Order attacked and destroyed the town with the goal of destroying Jogaila's hereditary state. The Teutons recorded the town as "Aschemynne". The Teutons managed to destroy the town, but it quickly recovered. By 1384, there is a manor of the Grand Duke of Lithuania in Ašmena. The Roman Catholic Church of the Assumption of the Blessed Virgin Mary into Heaven was built after 1387. This church was one of the first in the whole of the Grand Duchy of Lithuania. The church was administrated by the Franciscans.

In 1402, the Teutons attacked once more, but were bloodily repelled, so the Teutons withdrew to Medininkai. In 1413, the town became one of the most notable trade and commerce centres within the Vilnius Voivodship. Hence, in 1432 Ashmyany became the site of an important battle between the royal forces of Jogaila under Žygimantas Kęstutaitis and the forces of Švitrigaila, who was allied with the Teutonic Order. After the town was taken by the royalists, it became the private property of the Grand Dukes of Lithuania and started to develop rapidly.

Hanseatic trade routes passed through the town in the 15th century. On 1 September 1432, Švitrigaila was deposed from the throne in Ašmena. On 8 December 1432, Ašmena was the site of the Battle of Ašmena between Švitrigaila and Sigismund Kęstutaitis. There was a residential palace in Ašmena from the early 15th century to the end of the 18th century.

The Church of the Assumption of the Blessed Virgin Mary into Heaven burnt down in 1505, but was rebuilt. The Muscovite army destroyed and burnt Ašmena to the ground in 1519, during the Fourth Lithuanian–Muscovite War. The town was granted the Magdeburg rights in the 16th century. From 1566, Ašmena was the centre of the Ašmena County.

Ashmyany did not recover as quickly as previously after 1519, and in 1537 the town was granted several royal privileges to facilitate its reconstruction. In 1566, the town finally received Magdeburg rights, which were confirmed in 1683 (along with the privileges for the local merchants and burghers) by King John III Sobieski. In the 16th century the town was one of the most notable centers of Calvinism in the Polish–Lithuanian Commonwealth, after Mikołaj "the Red" Radziwiłł founded a college and a church there.

=== Polish–Lithuanian Commonwealth ===
The Muscovite army occupied Ašmena in 1655. Due to the widespread destruction and impoverishment during the Deluge, the town was exempt from taxes in 1655, 1661 and 1667. In 1667, the Dominican Order Church of Saint Michael the Archangel was built.

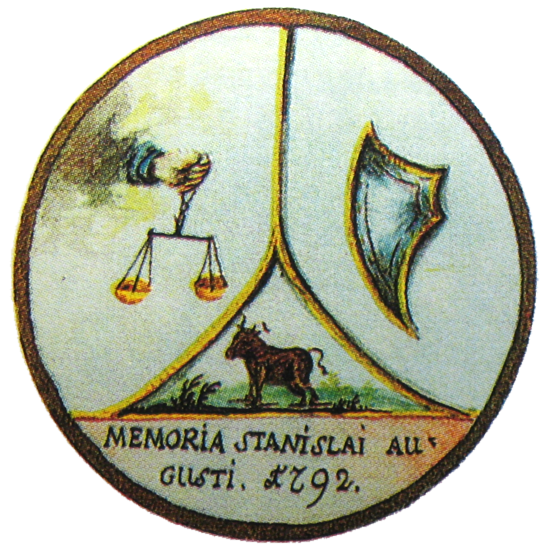
Coat of arms, 1792

In 1792, King Stanisław August Poniatowski confirmed all previous privileges and the fact, that Oszmiany, as it was then called, was a free city, subordinate only to the king and the local city council. With this, the town received its first ever Coat of arms. Composed of three fields, it featured a shield, a hand holding scales and the bull from Ciołek coat of arms, the monarch's personal coat of arms.

During the Uprising of 1794, Ašmena was the site of the insurgent staff under Jokūbas Jasinskis. At the same time, an insurgent group led by Mykolas Kleopas Oginskis was organised in the town.

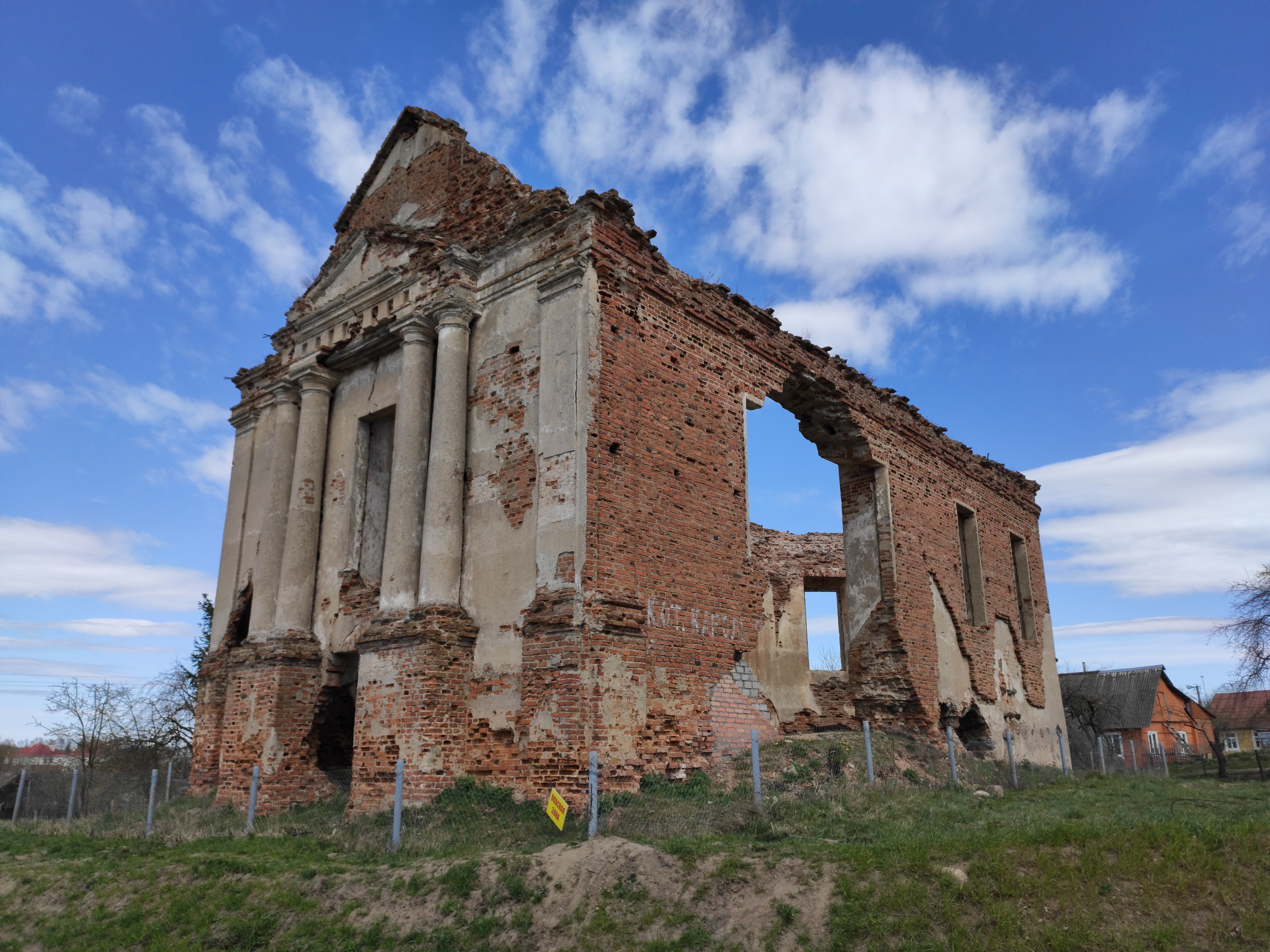
Ruins of the Franciscan Church

=== Russian Partition ===
In 1795, the town was annexed by the Russian Empire in the last Partition of Poland–Lithuania. The Church of Saint Michael the Archangel burnt down in 1797 but was rebuilt.

The Church of the Assumption of the Blessed Virgin Mary into Heaven was also rebuilt in bricks in 1812; however, the church decayed over the 19th century. During the French invasion of Russia, the Grande Armée took over Ašmena in 1812, and during several battles, the town partially burnt down.

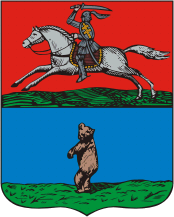
Russian coat of arms of the town, created after the November Uprising

==== November Uprising (1830-1831) ====
During the November Uprising, it was liberated by the town's citizens, led by a local priest, Jasiński, and Colonel Count Karol Dominik Przeździecki. However, in April 1831, in the face of a Russian offensive, the fighters were forced to withdraw to the Naliboki forest. After a minor skirmish with Stelnicki's rearguard, the Russian punitive expeditionary force of some 1,500 officers and soldiers proceeded to burn the town and massacre the civilian population, including some 500 women, children and elderly, who sought refuge in the Dominican Catholic Church. Even the local priest was murdered. Dozens of Ashmyany's Jews were killed and wounded and their houses looted as part of the massacre. In the Uprising of 1831, the Imperial Russian Army razed the town and massacred 150 locals in one of the town's churches.

==== Rebuilding ====
In 1845, as the town was rebuilding, it received a new coat of arms, in recognition of its population increase. It never recovered from its earlier losses, and by the end of the 19th century it became rather a provincial town, inhabited primarily by Jewish immigrants from other parts of Russia 'beyond the Pale'.

The Church of Saint Michael the Archangel was closed down in 1850, but rebuilt in 1900–10. In the late 19th century, a tavern was built and the Russian authorities built a Russian Orthodox church.

In 1912 the local Jewish community built a large synagogue.

=== World War I ===
After the end of World War I and the withdrawal of the German army from the German-ruled Lithuania District in 1919, Ashmyany came under Polish jurisdiction. According to the Soviet–Lithuanian Peace Treaty, signed on 12 July 1920, Ašmena was part of Lithuania. However, the Lithuanian territory was seized by the Polish Army that same year. After the Polish–Soviet War, Ashmyany was given to Poland by the Peace of Riga.

=== In interwar Poland ===
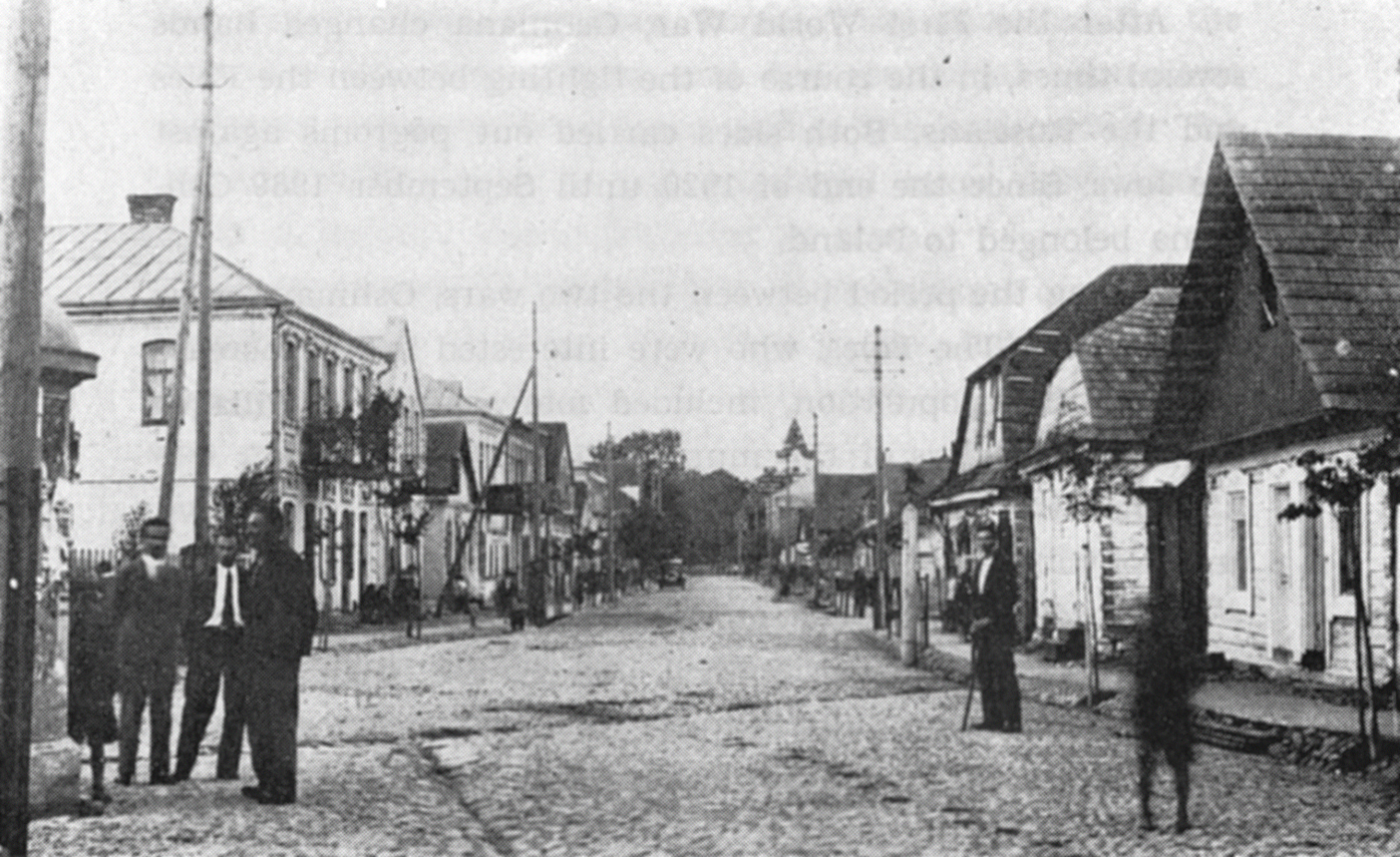
Oszmiana in the interwar period

It was a county center, first of Wilno Land, then of Wilno Voivodeship during Polish rule. The town was capital of Oszmiana County. According to the census from 1931, Poles constituted 81% of the inhabitants of the Oszmiana County. On the other hand, Poles and Jews dominated the town of Oszmiana.

=== World War II ===
Following the Soviet-German invasion of Poland in 1939, the Soviet Union occupied the area until 1941. Ashmyany was given to the Byelorussian Soviet Socialist Republic. Ashmyany was a raion center in Vileyka Region between 1939 and 1941. At the very end of the Soviet occupation, on the night of June 22 and morning of June 23, 1941, the NKVD murdered and buried in one mass grave 57 Polish prisoners from Ashmyany.

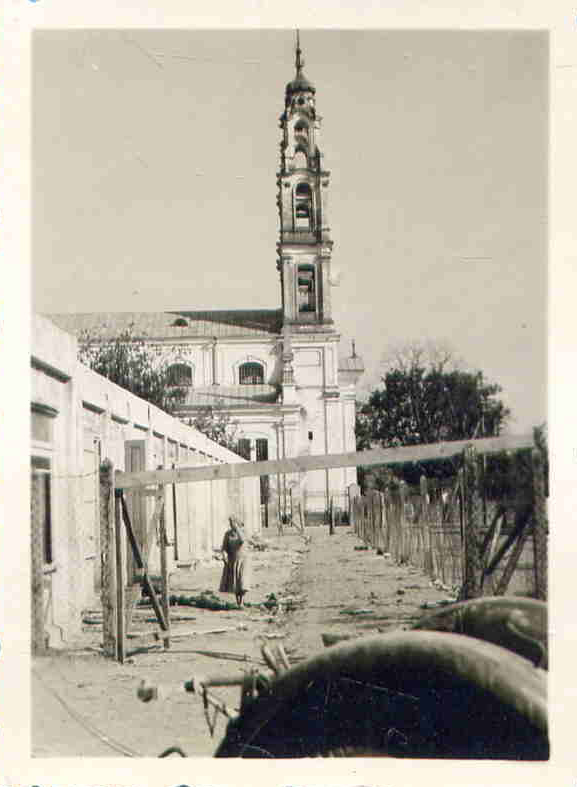
Oszmiana during German occupation in WW2

The town was captured by German forces on June 25, 1941. Around two weeks later, the Germans committed a massacre of some 40 Jews and Poles, accused of collaboration with the Soviets. After the Wehrmacht drove out the Soviet occupiers, the town was part of the Generalbezirk Litauen in Reichskommissariat Ostland in 1941–1944. On July 26, 1941, the Einsatzkommando 9 committed a massacre of 527 adult male Jews. Either in September or October 1941, a ghetto was established for Jews from the town and nearby villages. The Jews were subjected to overcrowding, foot shortages and single executions. In August 1942, 280 Jews (80 men and 200 women) were deported to forced labour in German-occupied Lithuania. On 23 October 1942, the German occupiers with the participation of the Jewish Police from Wilno rounded up and massacred 406 elderly Jews. In March and April 1943, the ghetto was liquidated and Jews were deported to forced labour camps in occupied Lithuania or to the Vilna Ghetto, whereas 713 people were massacred in the Ponary massacre.

On July 7, 1944, it was reoccupied by the Red Army during the Vilnius offensive. In 1945, the town was annexed by the USSR to the Byelorussian SSR. After 1944, the town was once more part of Vileyka Region, and between 1944 and 1960 it was incorporated into Molodechno Region until that region was disestablished. At that point Ashmyany became part of the Grodno Region, where it remains today.

=== Recent history ===
Since 1991, it has been a part of Belarus.

== Climate ==
This climatic region is typified by large seasonal temperature differences, with warm to hot (and often humid) summers and cold (sometimes severely cold) winters. According to the Köppen climate classification system, Ashmyany has a humid continental climate, abbreviated "Dfb" on climate maps.

Climate data for Ashmyany (1991–2020)
Month	Jan	Feb	Mar	Apr	May	Jun	Jul	Aug	Sep	Oct	Nov	Dec	Year
Record high °C (°F)	4.4 (39.9)	5.3 (41.5)	12.4 (54.3)	21.8 (71.2)	26.3 (79.3)	28.4 (83.1)	30.2 (86.4)	29.7 (85.5)	24.9 (76.8)	18.1 (64.6)	10.8 (51.4)	5.9 (42.6)	30.2 (86.4)
Mean daily maximum °C (°F)	−2.0 (28.4)	−0.9 (30.4)	4.1 (39.4)	12.3 (54.1)	18.2 (64.8)	21.5 (70.7)	23.5 (74.3)	22.8 (73.0)	17.1 (62.8)	10.0 (50.0)	3.7 (38.7)	−0.4 (31.3)	10.8 (51.4)
Daily mean °C (°F)	−4.2 (24.4)	−3.6 (25.5)	0.3 (32.5)	7.1 (44.8)	12.6 (54.7)	16.0 (60.8)	18.1 (64.6)	17.2 (63.0)	12.2 (54.0)	6.5 (43.7)	1.6 (34.9)	−2.4 (27.7)	6.8 (44.2)
Mean daily minimum °C (°F)	−6.6 (20.1)	−6.3 (20.7)	−3.1 (26.4)	2.3 (36.1)	7.2 (45.0)	10.8 (51.4)	13.0 (55.4)	12.1 (53.8)	8.0 (46.4)	3.5 (38.3)	−0.4 (31.3)	−4.6 (23.7)	3.0 (37.4)
Record low °C (°F)	−20.3 (−4.5)	−18.4 (−1.1)	−12.0 (10.4)	−4.0 (24.8)	0.0 (32.0)	4.6 (40.3)	8.0 (46.4)	6.3 (43.3)	0.7 (33.3)	−4.2 (24.4)	−9.3 (15.3)	−14.7 (5.5)	−20.3 (−4.5)
Average precipitation mm (inches)	42.6 (1.68)	37.3 (1.47)	38.2 (1.50)	40.3 (1.59)	66.5 (2.62)	68.8 (2.71)	86.7 (3.41)	80.1 (3.15)	54.6 (2.15)	54.5 (2.15)	43.9 (1.73)	44.9 (1.77)	658.4 (25.92)
Average precipitation days (≥ 1.0 mm)	11.5	9.9	9.4	7.6	9.4	10.4	10.2	9.1	8.8	9.8	10.2	11.2	117.5
Mean monthly sunshine hours	37.0	60.6	139.1	201.2	267.7	280.9	281.6	257.2	169.4	98.6	33.0	26.2	1,852.5
Source: NOAA

== Demographics ==
Map of Ashmyany

- 1848 – 4,115 inhabitants
- 1859 – 3,066 inhabitants
- 1871 – 4,546 inhabitants
- 1880 – 5,050 inhabitants (2501 Jews, 2175 Roman Catholics, 352 Orthodoxs)
- 1897 – 6,400 or 7124 inhabitants
- 1907/08 – 8,300 inhabitants
- 1914 – 8,200 inhabitants
- 1921 – 6,000 inhabitants
- 1939 – 8,500 inhabitants
- 1970 – 9,621 inhabitants
- 1974 – 10,000 inhabitants (Great Soviet Encyclopedia)
- 1991 – 15,200 inhabitants
- 2004 – 14,900 inhabitants
- 2006 – 14,600 inhabitants
- 2007 – 14,269 inhabitants
- 2023 – 16,870 inhabitants
- 2024 – 16,787 inhabitants
- 2025 – 16,804 inhabitants

== Landmarks ==
- Catholic church of St. Michael the Archangel
- Catholic church of Franciscan, built in 1822
- Synagogue, built in 1912
- Orthodox church of Resurrection, built in 1875
- Watermill

== Gallery ==
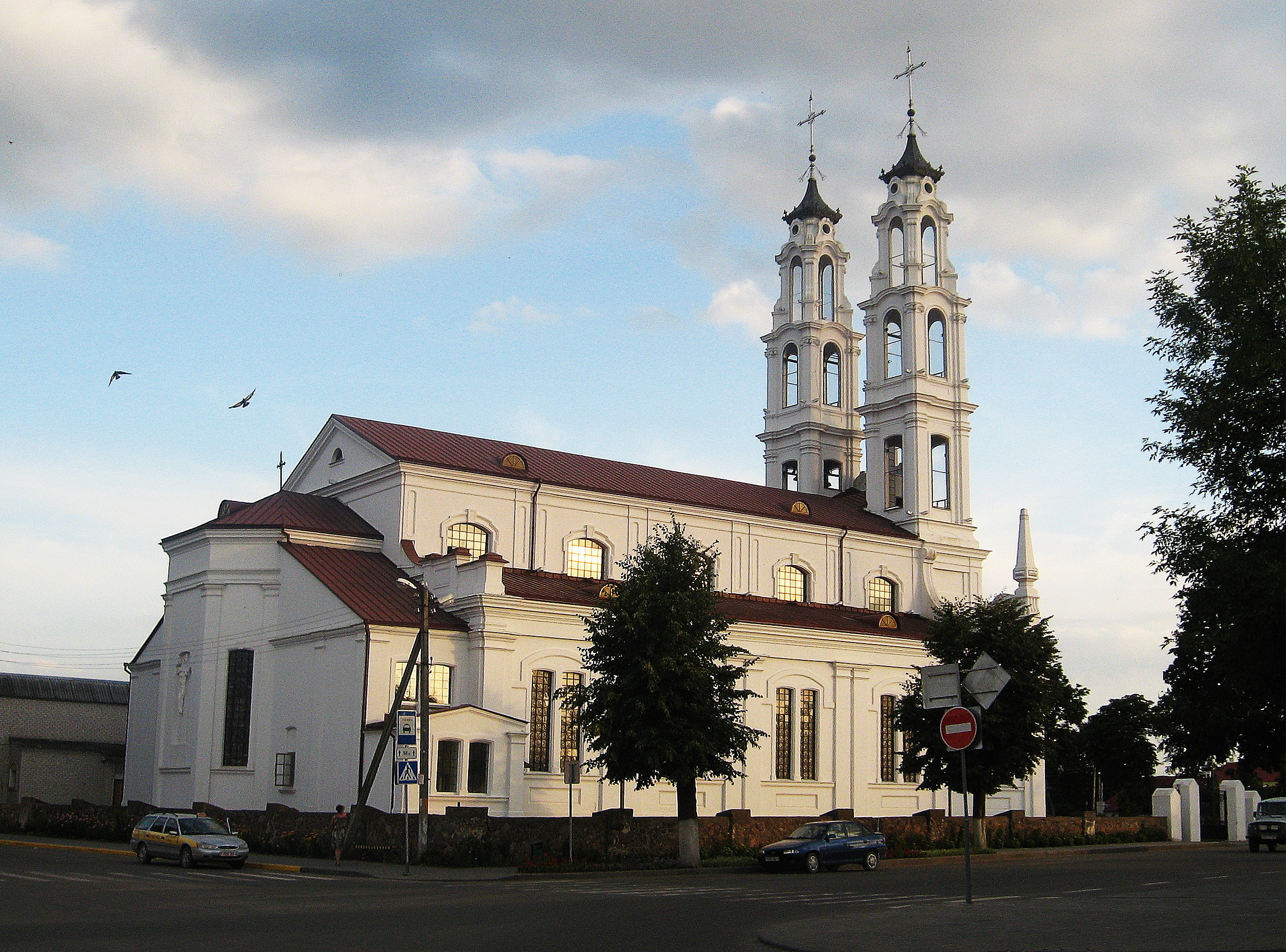
Dominican Church of Saint Michael the Archangel

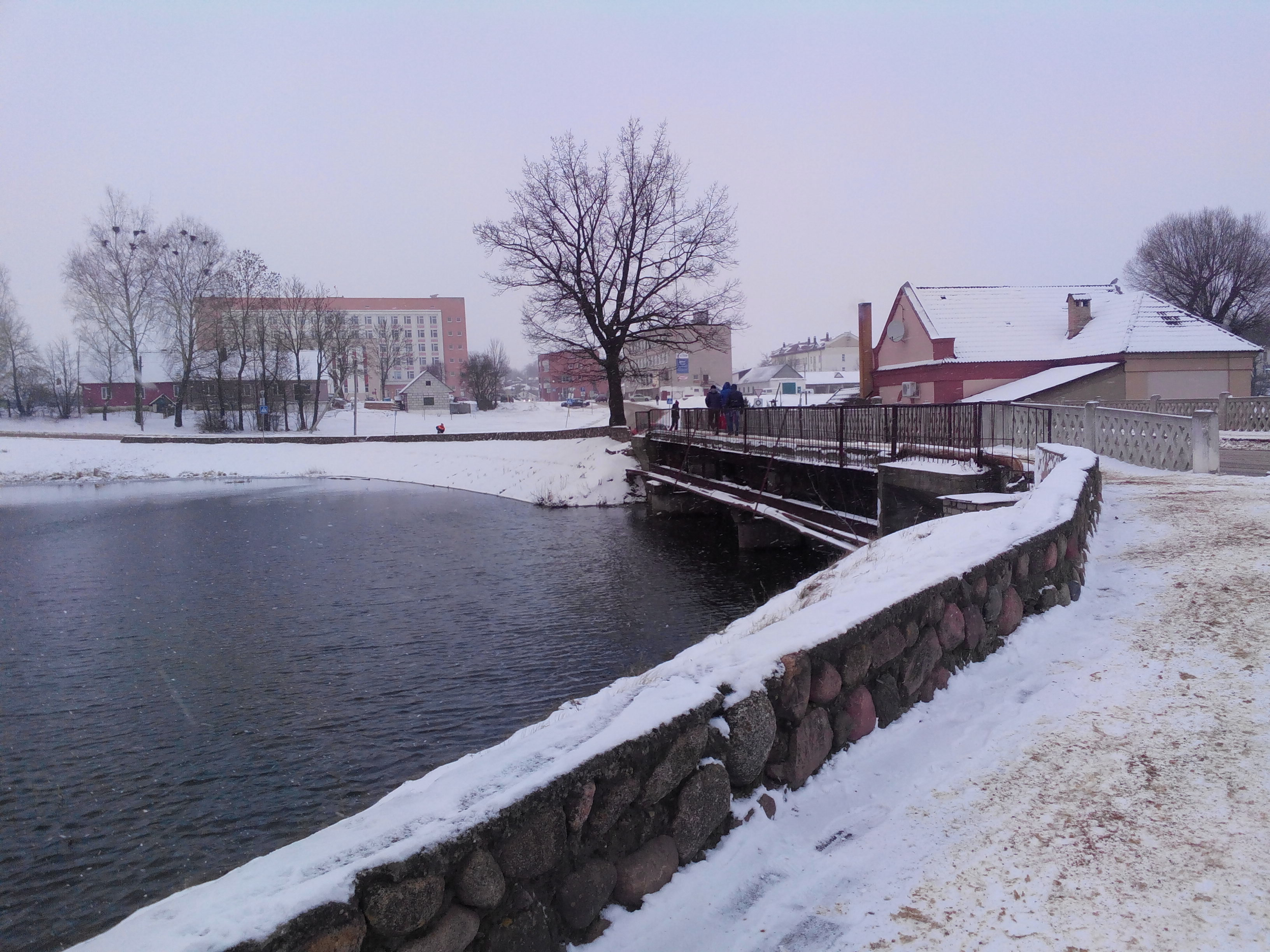
Borunsky Bridge

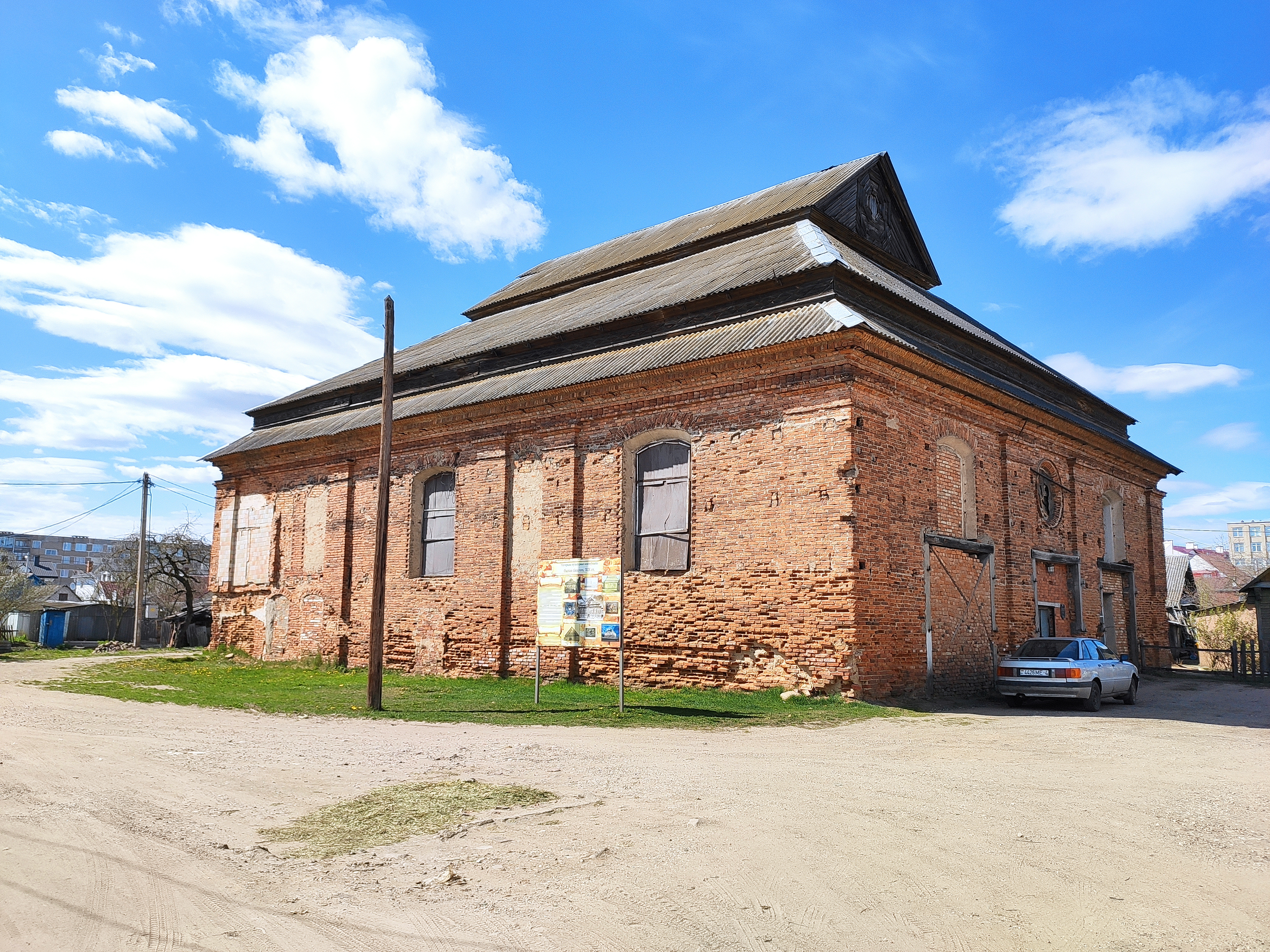
Synagogue

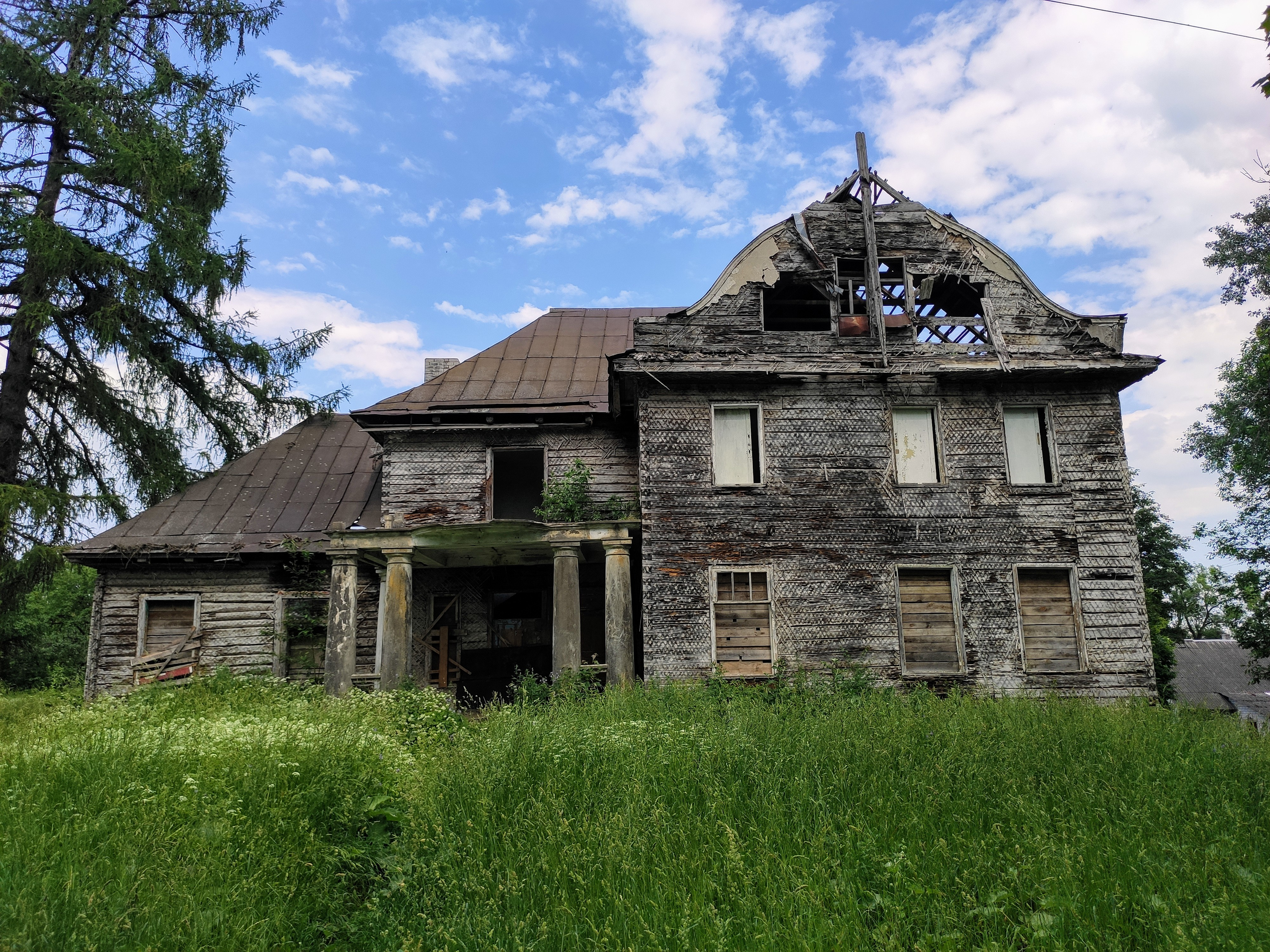
Lejba Strugacz Manor

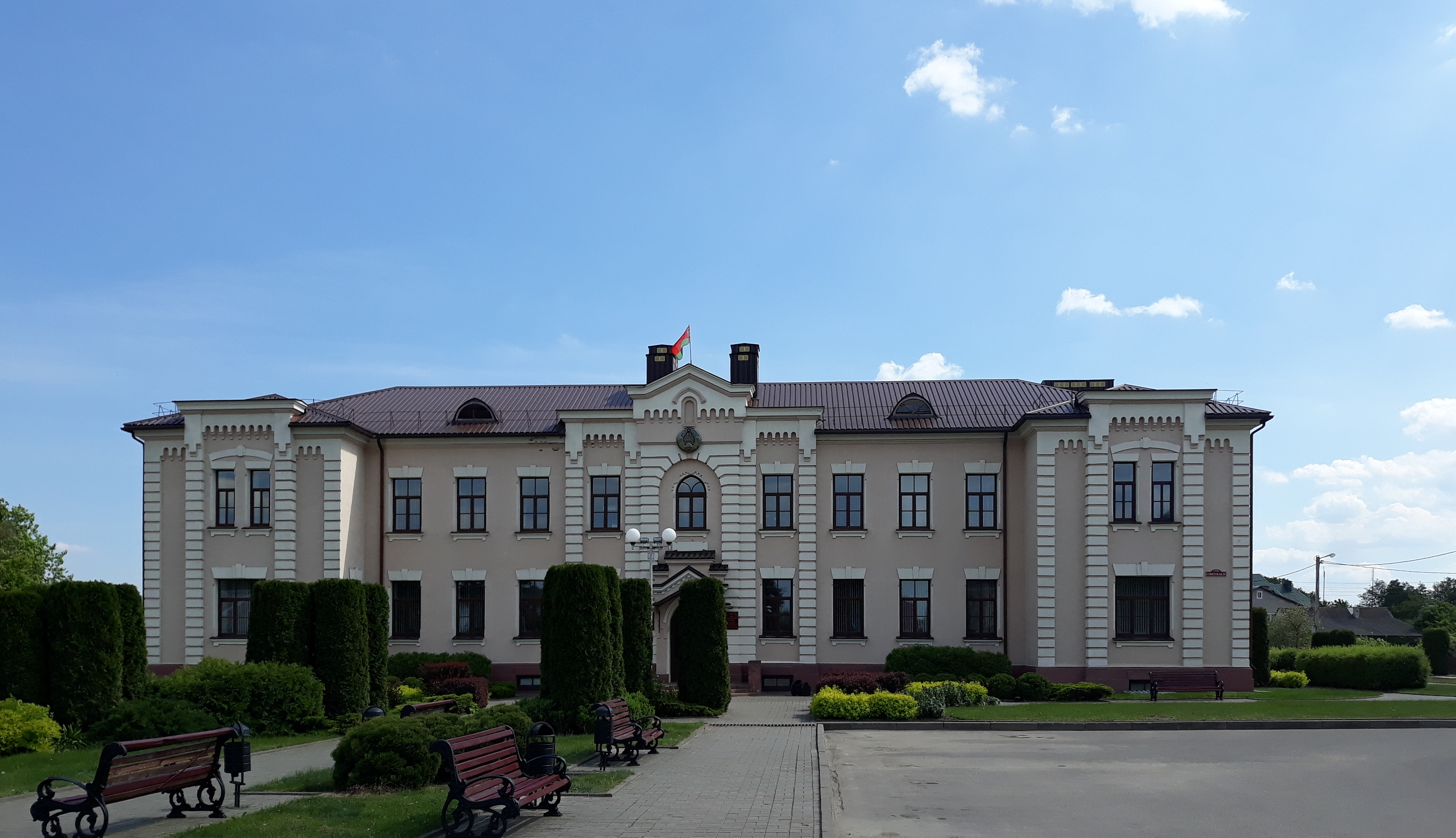
Court

== Miscellaneous ==
- Alternate names: Oshmianka (Polish), Oszmiana, Aschemynne, Oshmyany, Ašmena, Oshmana, Oshmene, Oshmina, Osmiany, Oszmiana, Ozmiana, Osmiana, Oßmiana, Possibly Oschmjansky (Middle Ages maps)
- Mentioned in: Memoirs of Baron Lejeune, Volume II, Chapter VII.

== Notable people ==
- Jan Swołyński (died between 1644 and 1647), marszałek of Oszmiany

A number of persons were awarded the title of "honorary citizen of Ashmyany.

=== Birth place ===
- Abba Kovner (1918–1987), Jewish partisan during World War II
- Czesław Jankowski (1857–1929), Polish poet, critic, publicist, historian, local expert, social activist
- Jacob Saphir (1822–1886), writer, ethnographer, researcher of Hebrew manuscripts, a traveler and emissary of the rabbis of Eastern European Jewish descent who settled in Jerusalem during his early life

== Bibliography ==
- Gaučas, Petras (2002). "Ašmena". Visuotinė lietuvių enciklopedija. Vol. T. II (Arktis-Beketas). Vilnius: Mokslo ir enciklopedijų leidybos institutas.
- Zinkevičius, Zigmas (2007). Senosios Lietuvos valstybės vardynas. Vilnius: Science and Encyclopaedia Publishing Institute. ISBN 978-5-420-01606-0.
