= Jan Swołyński =

- Died: between 1644 and 1647
- Noble family: Swołyński family
- wife: Zofia Tomkowicz, Teodora Tryzna
- Issue: Michał Kazimierz, Helena, Konstanty Antoni (doubtful)
- Father: Jan Swołyński
- Occupation: Oszmiana's marshal

Jan Swołyński (died between 1644 and 1647) was a Polish nobleman (szlachcic) and a marshal (marszałek) of Oszmiany.

He was the son of Jan, a Protestant and connected with the Radziwiłł family. Jan Swołyński was an official of Janusz Radziwiłł in Kopysia and Smolewicze. After the death of Janusz Radziwiłł (1620), Swołyński accepted the patronage of Krzysztof Radziwiłł, a half-brother of Janusz. During the campaign in Livonia in 1622, he was an adjutant of K. Radziwiłł. As a porucznik of hussar's chorągiew he fought in war with Sweden in 1625 and 1626.

Before 8 December 1642 Swołyński was nominated Marshal of Oszmiany by king Władysław IV.
