= Stracha =

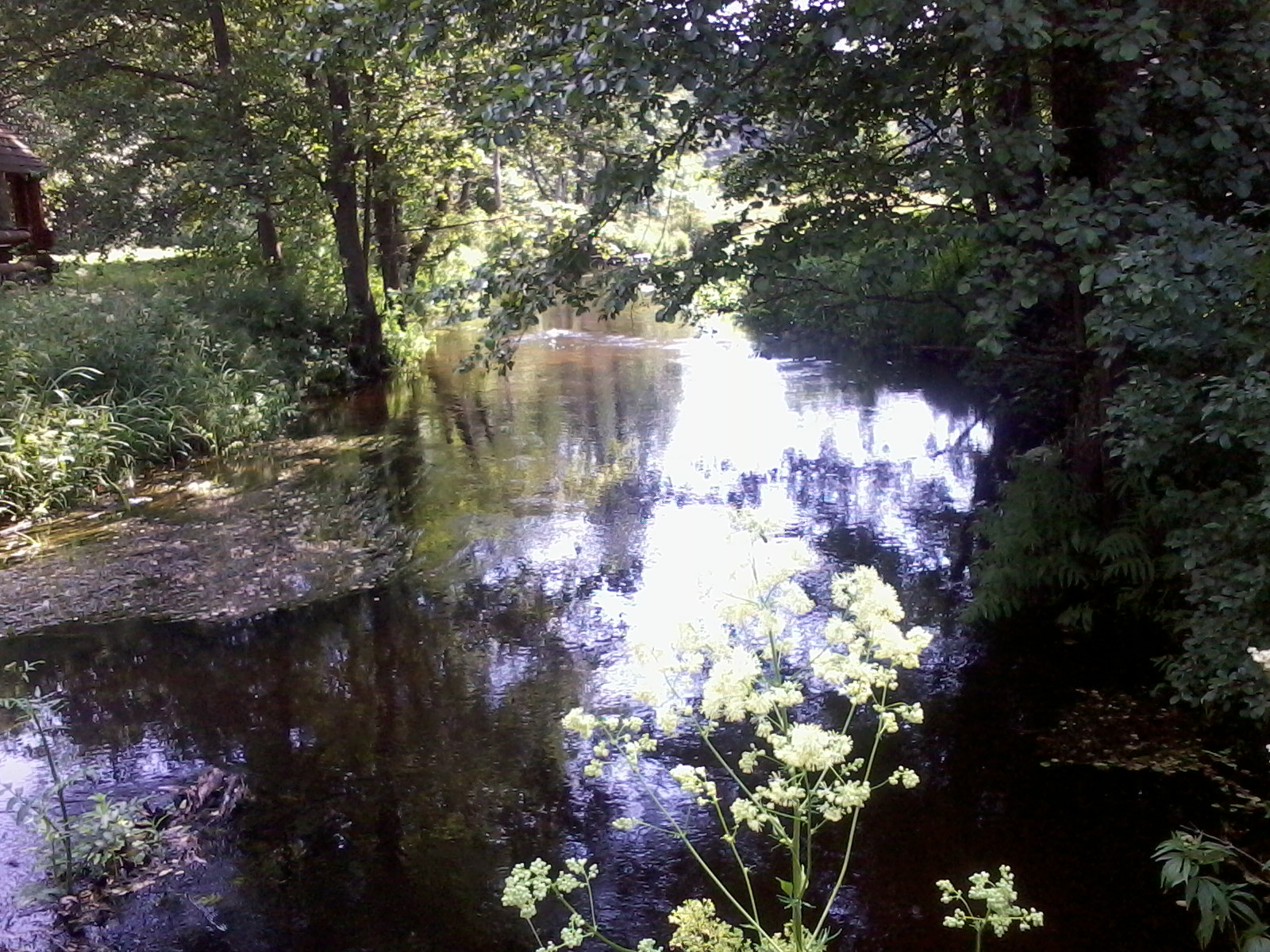
- Native name: Страча (Belarusian)

Location
- Country: Belarus

Physical characteristics
- Mouth: Neris (Viliya)
  - coordinates: 54.7975°N 26.2002°E

Basin features
- Progression: Neris→ Neman→ Baltic Sea

The Stracha (Belarusian: Страча) is a river in Belarus. It is a right tributary of the Vilija (Neris). The 59 km long river has a basin area of 1140 km^{2}. The average discharge of water at the mouth is 9.1 m³/s. The average slope of the surface water is 1%. Tributaries of the Stracha include the Lyntupka, Svirytsa and the Tushchanka. The Lake Yedigei lies along the river.

The Battle of Stracha took place here between the Polish and the Soviets on February 2, 1944.
