= Ashmyanka =

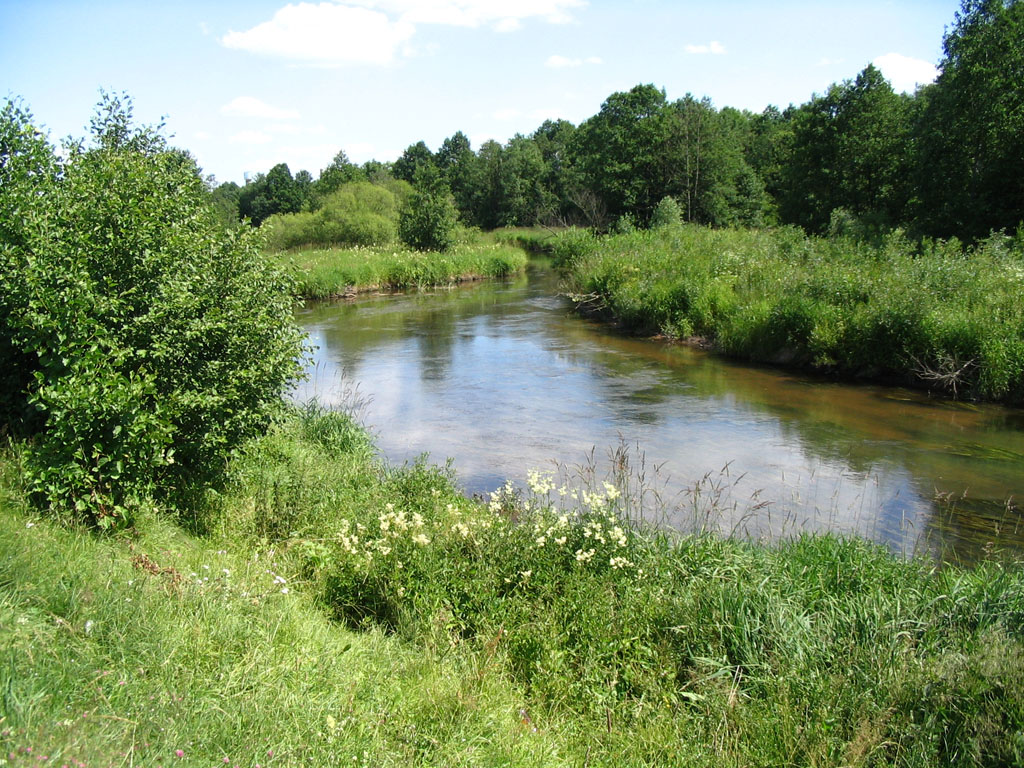

Location
- Country: Belarus

Physical characteristics
- Mouth: Neris
  - coordinates: 54.7756°N 26.2045°E

Basin features
- Progression: Neris→ Neman→ Baltic Sea

The Ashmyanka (Belarusian: Ашмянка [ʌʂˈmʲankə], Lithuanian: Ašmena, Polish: Oszmianka, Russian: Ошмянка) is a river in Belarus. A left-bank tributary of the Neris (Wilia), the Ashmyanka has a length of 104 km, starting from the village of Muravanaya Ashmyanka and passing through the town of Ashmyany (Oszmiana). It is located in the north of Hrodna Voblast. It flows into the Neris near the village of Mikhalishki, northeast of Astravyets.
