= Narach (river) =

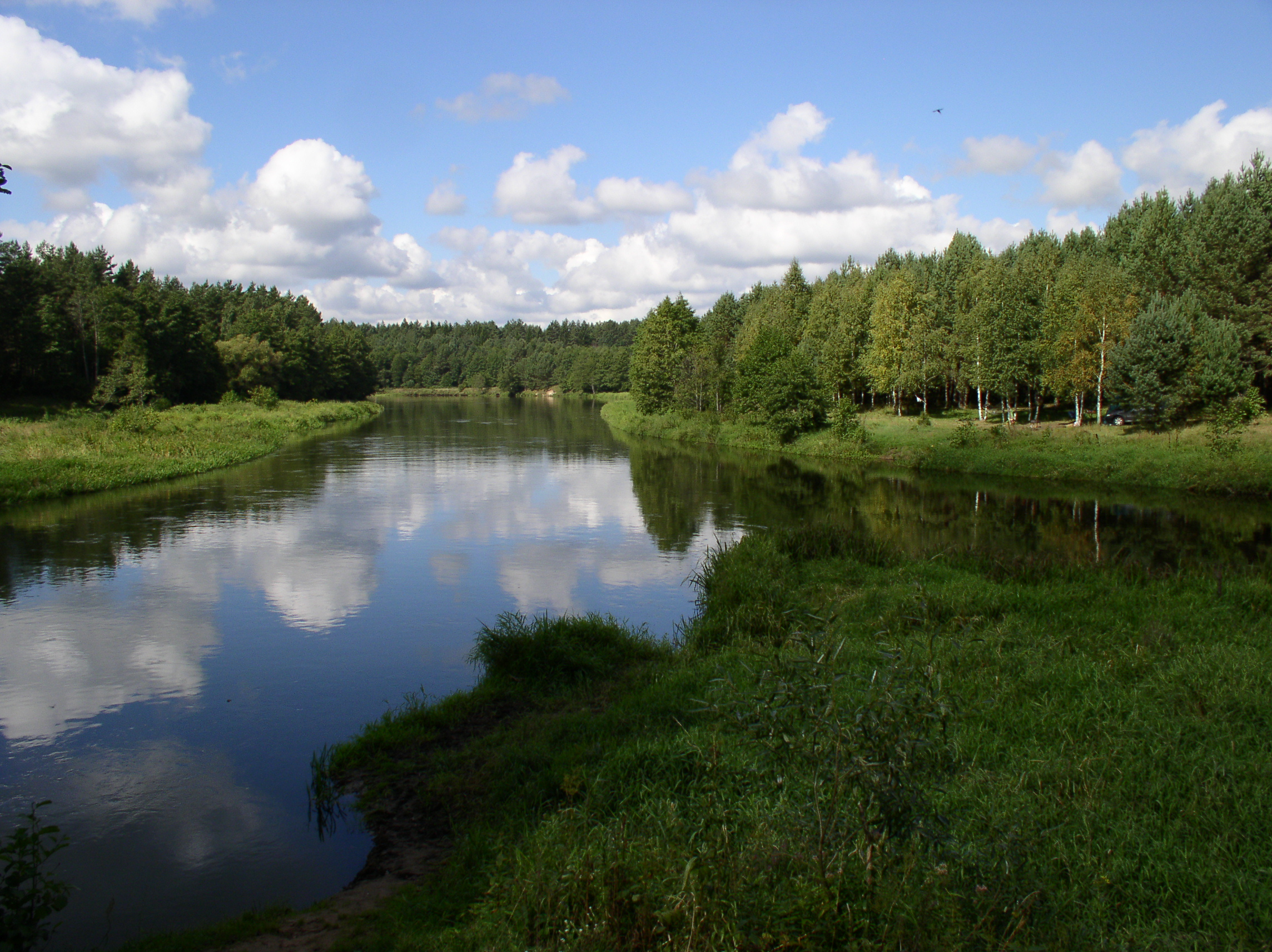
- The junction of the Viliya and Narač rivers

Location
- Country: Belarus

Physical characteristics
- Source
  - location: Lake Narach, Belarus
- Mouth: Neris (Viliya)
  - coordinates: 54.4395°N 26.6500°E
- Length: circa 50 km (31 mi)

Basin features
- Progression: Neris→ Neman→ Baltic Sea

The Narach (Belarusian: Нарач, Narač [ˈnaratʂ]; Russian: Нарочь, Naroch'; Lithuanian: Narutis) is a river in northwestern Belarus (Miadzieł raion, Minsk Province). It is a right-bank tributary of the Neris (Viliya) into which it flows near Maladziečna.
