= Neris =

River in Lithuania and Belarus

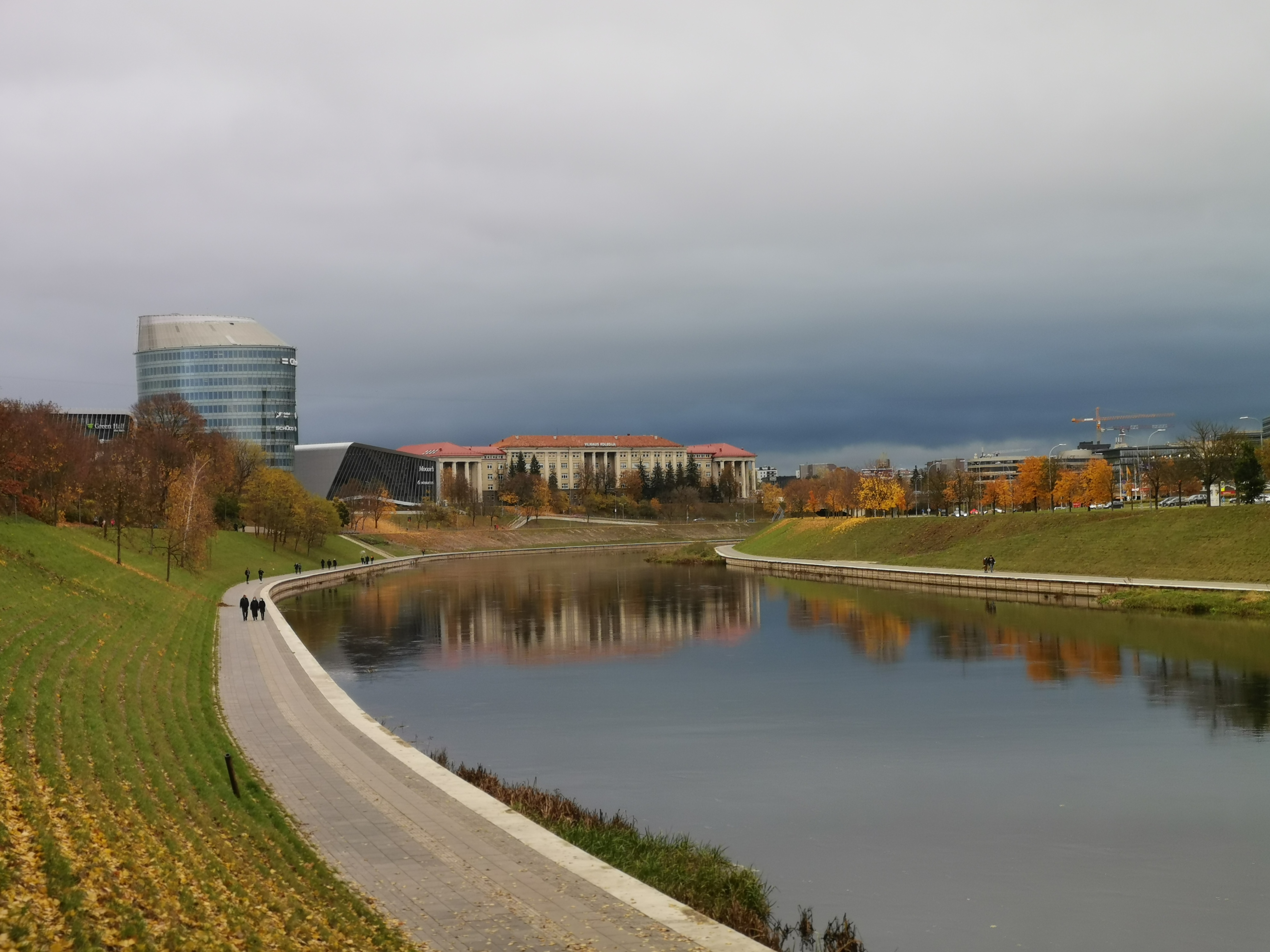
- The Neris in Vilnius, Lithuania from Žvėrynas Bridge

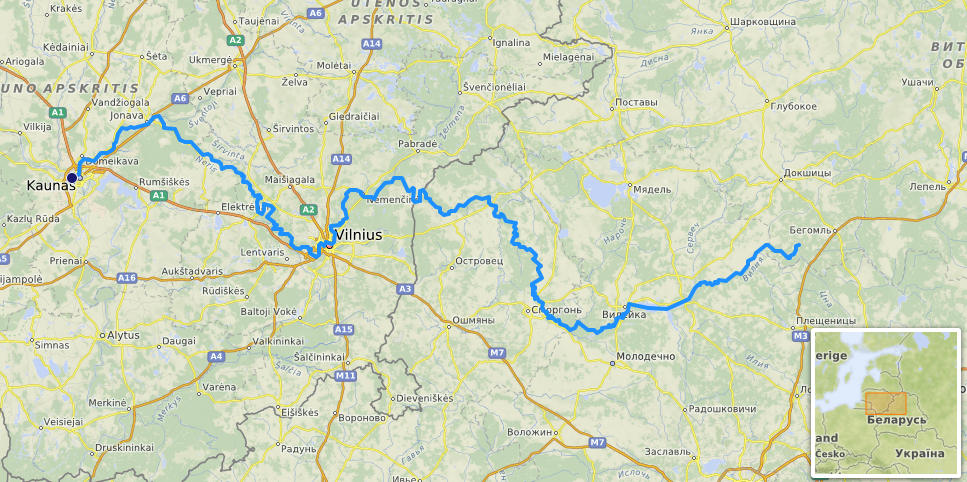

Location
- Country: Belarus, Lithuania
- Cities: Vilnius, Kaunas

Physical characteristics
- Source
  - location: Belarus
- Mouth: Neman
  - coordinates: 54°54′01″N 23°52′27″E
- Length: 510 km (320 mi)
- Basin size: 24,942.3 km^{2} (9,630.3 sq mi)
- Discharge
  - average: 182 m^{3}/s (6,400 cu ft/s)

Basin features
- Progression: Neman→ Baltic Sea
- Tributaries
  - left: Oksna

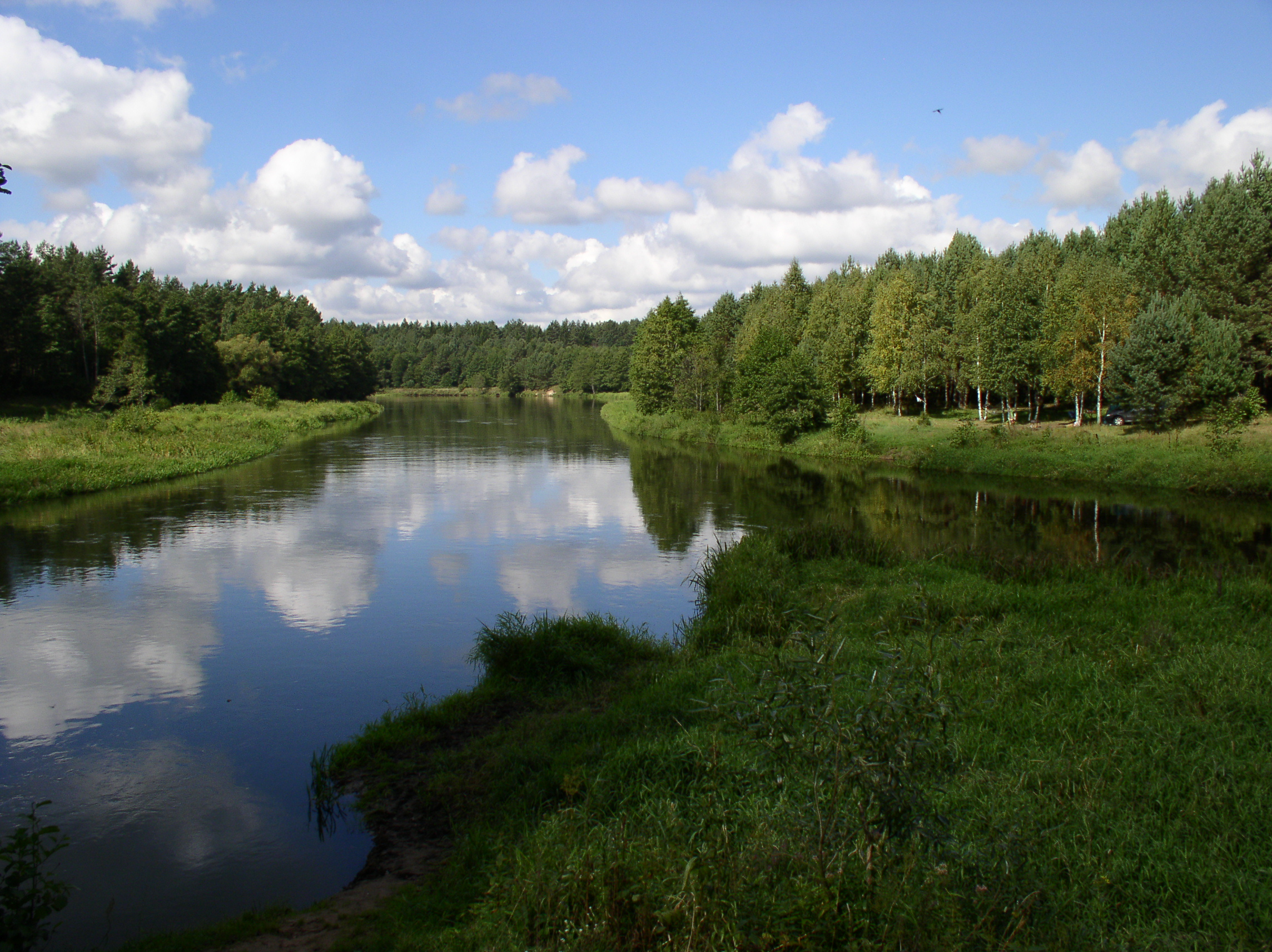
Confluence of the Viliya and Narach: a conjectured reason for the dual naming of Neris

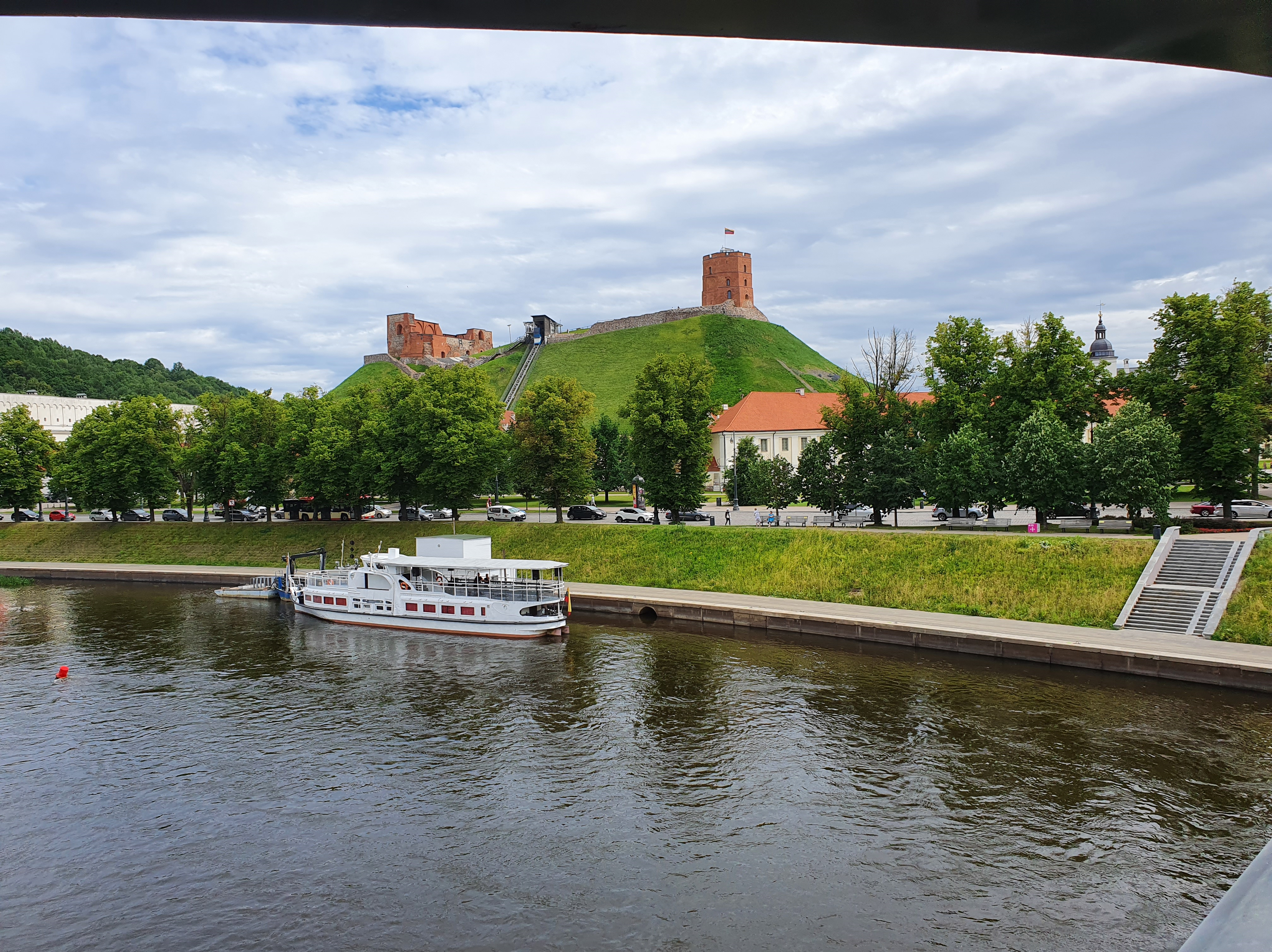
Neris near Gediminas Tower in Vilnius, Lithuania

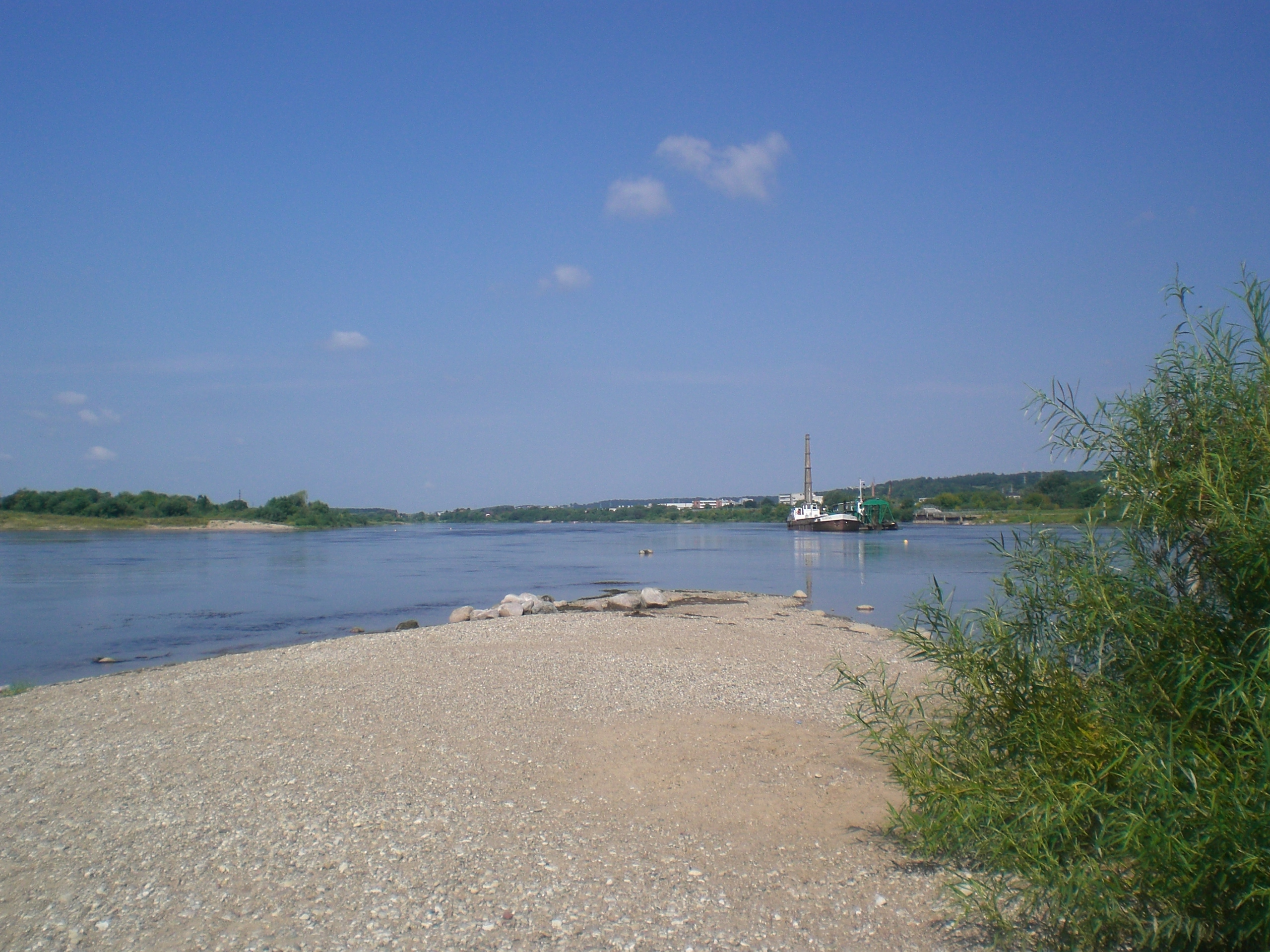
Confluence of Neman and Neris in Kaunas

The river Neris or Vilija (Belarusian: Ві́лія, romanized: Vilija, Polish: Wilia) rises in northern Belarus. It flows westward, passing through Vilnius (Lithuania's capital) and in the south-centre of that country it flows into the Nemunas (Neman) from the right bank, at Kaunas, as its main tributary. Its length is 510 km (320 mi).

After passing through Belarus for 276 km (171 mi), the Neris flows through Lithuania for a further 235 km (146 mi).

The Neris connects successive Lithuanian capitals – Kernavė and Vilnius. Along its banks are the burial places of the pagan Lithuanians. At 25 km (16 mi) from Vilnius there is are old Karmazinai Hillfort and Karmazinai burial mound.

== Dual naming ==
The reasons for the dual naming of the river as Neris by the Lithuanians and Viliya (formerly Velja, meaning "big, great" in Slavic) by the Slavs are complex. Even in Vilnius, there are toponyms including both names, e. g. Neris remains in the riverside names of Paneriai and Paneriškės while Velja is a part of the name Valakampiai, which means "an angle of Velja" in Lithuanian. In Kaunas, a part of the city by the Neris river, that was formerly a separate town, is also named Vilijampolė (Vilija + polis, that means "polis by Vilija").

Although it has been suggested that Neris is the primeval name of the river, while the name Viliya is of secondary extraction, the dual naming most probably emerged from the confluence of the rivers Neris (now known as Narač River, leaving Lake Narač) and Velja, in the historical Slavic/Baltic borderland, each ethnos choosing their own name for the river starting at the confluence. It is moreover evidenced by the fact that the name Neris was never used to name the river Velja up to this confluence. Therefore, it has been proposed that the Narač River had in fact been considered the upper reaches of Neris by the Balts in ancient times.

Some linguists, however, point to the fact, that Viliya in it upper part is not "big" or "great" at all and the name cognates with Lithuanian words velnias and vėlė. What is more, all the territory of upper Neris before the 12th c. was inhabited by the Balts, the archaeological East Lithuanian Barrow Culture.

=== Etymology of "Neris" ===
The name Neris is of Baltic origin, a cognate of the Lithuanian nerti generally meaning "to dive, swim downstream" as well as "to net, crochet". It is likely that the name had a more general meaning of "flow" or particularly "swift and swirling flow" in early times.

Etymologically, the name is one of a class of hydronyms, widespread in the modern and prehistoric Baltic ranges; e.g., Lithuanian Narotis, Narasa (rivers), Narutis (lake), Old Prussian Narus, Nara near Moscow. These are related to Lithuanian narus, "deep", and nerti, "to dive".

More remote connections are obscure, although the root is believed to be Indo-European. There are a number of possibilities:

- Pokorny's 2nd *ner-, "under" (Indogermanisches etymologisches Wörterbuch, pp765–766);
- Derksen's *nerH-, o-grade *norH- (Slavic Inherited Lexicon);
- A relation to the Greek god Nereus, which may be from *snau-, "to give milk to", in the sense of "flow" (Partridge, Origins (1983)).
- Another relationship of "Neris" with the Sanskrit word "Neer"/"Naar" which means water.

== Basin ==
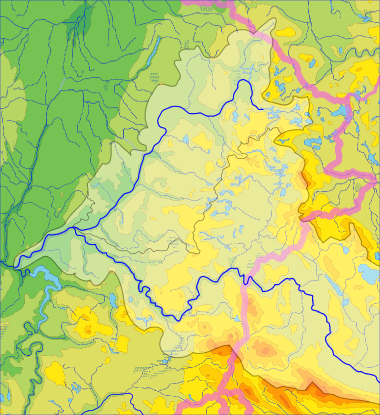
The Neris drainage basin. Standing out are the river and its main tributary. The latter rises near to Latvia, the Šventoji

The total watershed area is 25,100 km^{2} (9,700 mi^{2}), 10,920 km^{2} (4,220 mi^{2}) of which are in Belarus.

=== Basin within Belarus ===
The river is called Vilija in Belarus. Belarus's largest reservoir, Vileyka Reservoir, is located by Vilija, near the Vileyka city.

==== Right tributaries ====
- Narač
- Servač
- Strača

==== Left tributaries ====
- Ilija
- Uša
- Ašmianka

=== Basin within Lithuania ===
The watershed within Lithuania is 13,849 km^{2} (5,347 mi^{2})

==== Tributaries ====
- Verkė
- Vilnia
- Vokė
- Bražuolė
- Dūkšta
- Musė
- Laukysta
- Lomena
- Šventoji
- Lokys
- Šešuva
- Saidė
