= List of highways numbered 7 =

The following highways are numbered 7. For roads numbered A7, see list of A7 roads.

Route 7, or Highway 7, may refer to:

== International ==
- AH7 Asian Highway 7
- E07 European route E07
- E007 European route E007

== Afghanistan ==
- Kunduz-Khomri Highway (A7)

== Albania ==
- National Road 7 (Albania) Road in Albania, from Rrogozhine to Elbasan

== Argentina ==
- National Route 7

== Australia ==
=== New South Wales ===
- Westlink M7 Motorway (Sydney)

=== Queensland ===
  - Clem Jones Tunnel (Brisbane)
  - Airport Link (Brisbane)
- Ipswich Road, Queensland
- Ipswich Motorway, Queensland
  - Carnarvon Highway, Queensland
  - Dawson Highway, Queensland
  - Gregory Highway, Queensland
  - Capricorn Highway, Queensland
- Fitzroy Developmental Road, Queensland (Regional)
- Robina Parkway, Queensland (Gold Coast)

=== Tasmania ===
- West Tamar Highway, Tasmania

=== Western Australia ===
- Leach Highway, Western Australia

== Austria ==
- Mühlkreis Autobahn

== Belarus ==
- M 7 M7 highway (Belarus)

== Bolivia ==
- National Route 7 (Bolivia)

== Bulgaria ==
- I-7 road (Bulgaria)

== Cambodia ==
- National Highway 7 (Cambodia)

== Canada ==
- Alberta Highway 7
- British Columbia Highway 7
- Manitoba Highway 7
- New Brunswick Route 7
- Northwest Territories Highway 7
- Nova Scotia Trunk 7
- Ontario Highway 7
  - York Regional Road 7 in Ontario
- Prince Edward Island Route 7
- Saskatchewan Highway 7
- Yukon Highway 7

== China ==
- G7 Expressway

== Cuba ==
- Highway 2–I–7

== Czech Republic ==
- D7 Motorway
- I/7 Highway (in Czech)

== Djibouti ==
- RN-7 (Djibouti)

== Dominican Republic ==
- DR-7

== Eswatini ==
- MR7 road

== Finland ==
- Finnish national road 7

== France ==
- Route nationale 7

== Germany ==
- Bundesautobahn 7
- Bundesstraße 7

== Greece ==
- A7 motorway (Corinth–Tripoli–Kalamata)
- EO7 road

== Hong Kong ==
- Route 7 (Hong Kong)

== Hungary ==
- M7 motorway (Hungary)
- Main road 7 (Hungary)

== India ==
- NH 7

- State Highway 7 (Andhra Pradesh)
- State Highway 7 (Karnataka)
- State Highway 7 (Kerala)

== Indonesia ==
- Indonesian National Route 7

== Iraq ==
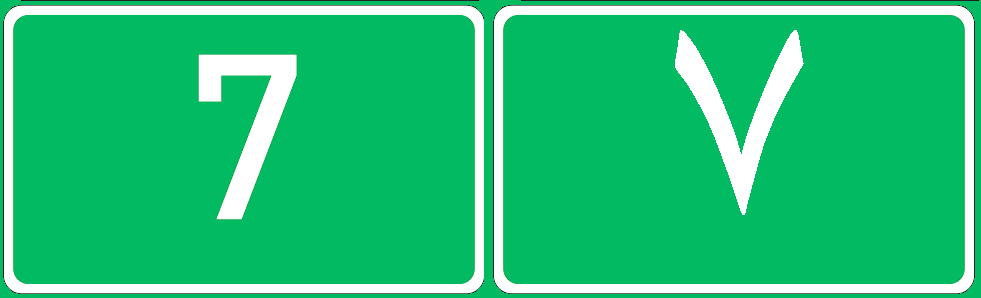
- Highway 7 (Iraq)

== Iran ==
- Freeway 7 (Iran)

== Ireland ==
- N7 road, part of which is designated as M7 motorway

== Israel ==
- Highway 7 (Israel)

== Italy ==
- Autostrada A7
- RA 7
- State road 7

== Japan ==
- National Route 7
- Akita Expressway
- Nihonkai-Tōhoku Expressway
- Yokohama Northwest Route

== Korea, South ==
- National Route 7

== Malaysia ==
- Cheras–Kajang Expressway
- FT 7 Malaysia Federal Route 7
- A7 Perak State Route A7
- C7 Pahang State Route C7
- J7 Johor State Route J7
- N7 Negeri Sembilan State Route N7

== New Zealand ==
- New Zealand State Highway 7
  - New Zealand State Highway 7A

== Nigeria ==
- A7 highway (Nigeria)

== Norway ==
- Norwegian National Road 7

== Paraguay ==
- National Route 7

== Philippines ==
- R-7 Radial Road 7
- N7 highway (Philippines)

== Poland ==
- National road 7
- Expressway S7

== Romania ==
- Drumul Naţional 7
  - Drumul Național 7A
  - Drumul Naţional 7C - Transfăgărășan
- A7 motorway (Romania)

== Russia ==
- M7 highway (Russia)

== Saudi Arabia ==
- Saudi Arabia: Road Number 7

== South Africa ==
- M7 (Port Elizabeth)

== Thailand ==
- Motorway 7 (Thailand)

== United Kingdom ==
- A7 road (Great Britain)
- A7 road (Northern Ireland)

== United States ==
- Interstate 7 (proposed)
- U.S. Route 7
- New England Interstate Route 7 (former)
- Alabama State Route 7
  - County Route 7 (Chilton County, Alabama)
  - County Route 7 (Dallas County, Alabama)
  - County Route 7 (Elmore County, Alabama)
  - County Route 7 (Jackson County, Alabama)
  - County Route 7 (Lauderdale County, Alabama)
  - County Route 7 (Perry County, Alabama)
  - County Route 7 (Talladega County, Alabama)
  - County Route 7 (Shelby County, Alabama)
- Alaska Route 7
- Arkansas Highway 7
- California State Route 7
  - California State Route 7 (1934–1964) (former)
  - California State Route 7 (1964–1984) (former)
  - County Route D7
  - County Route E7
  - County Route G7
  - County Route J7
  - County Route N7
  - County Route S7
- Colorado State Highway 7
- Delaware Route 7
- Florida State Road 7
- Georgia State Route 7
- Idaho State Highway 7
- Illinois Route 7
- Indiana State Road 7
- Iowa Highway 7
- K-7 (Kansas highway)
- Kentucky Route 7
- Louisiana State Route 7 (former)
- Maine State Route 7
- Maryland Route 7
- M-7 (Michigan highway) (former)
- Minnesota State Highway 7
  - County Road 7 (Anoka County, Minnesota)
  - County Road 7 (Goodhue County, Minnesota)
  - County Road 7 (St. Louis County, Minnesota)
- Mississippi Highway 7
  - County Route 7 (Union County, Mississippi)
- Missouri Route 7
- Montana Highway 7
- Nebraska Highway 7
- Nevada State Route 7 (former)
- New Jersey Route 7
  - County Route 7 (Monmouth County, New Jersey)
  - County Route 7 (Ocean County, New Jersey)
- New Mexico State Road 7
- New York State Route 7
  - County Route 7 (Allegany County, New York)
  - County Route 7 (Chemung County, New York)
  - County Route 7 (Columbia County, New York)
  - County Route 7 (Delaware County, New York)
  - County Route 7 (Dutchess County, New York)
  - County Route 7 (Franklin County, New York)
  - County Route 7 (Genesee County, New York)
  - County Route 7 (Greene County, New York)
  - County Route 7 (Herkimer County, New York)
  - County Route 7 (Jefferson County, New York)
  - County Route 7 (Livingston County, New York)
  - County Route 7 (Niagara County, New York)
  - County Route 7 (Onondaga County, New York)
  - County Route 7 (Orange County, New York)
  - County Route 7 (Oswego County, New York)
  - County Route 7 (Rensselaer County, New York)
  - County Route 7 (Saratoga County, New York)
  - County Route 7 (Schoharie County, New York)
  - County Route 7 (St. Lawrence County, New York)
  - County Route 7 (Suffolk County, New York)
  - County Route 7 (Tioga County, New York)
  - County Route 7 (Ulster County, New York)
  - County Route 7 (Warren County, New York)
  - County Route 7 (Wyoming County, New York)
- North Carolina Highway 7
- North Dakota Highway 7 (former)
- Ohio State Route 7
- Oklahoma State Highway 7
  - Oklahoma State Highway 7D
- Oregon Route 7
- Pennsylvania Route 7 (former)
- Rhode Island Route 7
- South Carolina Highway 7
- Tennessee State Route 7
- Texas State Highway 7
  - Texas State Highway Loop 7
  - Texas Park Road 7
  - Farm to Market Road 7 (former)
  - Texas Recreational Road 7
- Utah State Route 7
  - Utah State Route 7 (1912-1977) (former)
- Virginia State Route 7
- Washington State Route 7
  - Washington State Highway 7 (former)
- West Virginia Route 7

Territories

- Guam Highway 7

== Uruguay ==
- Route 7 Gral. Aparicio Saravia

== Zambia ==
- M7 road (Zambia)

== See also ==
- List of A7 roads
- List of highways numbered 7A
- List of highways numbered 7B
- List of highways numbered 7C
- CR7 (road), roads called CR7

Preceded by 6	Lists of highways 7	Succeeded by 8
