= Vilnia =

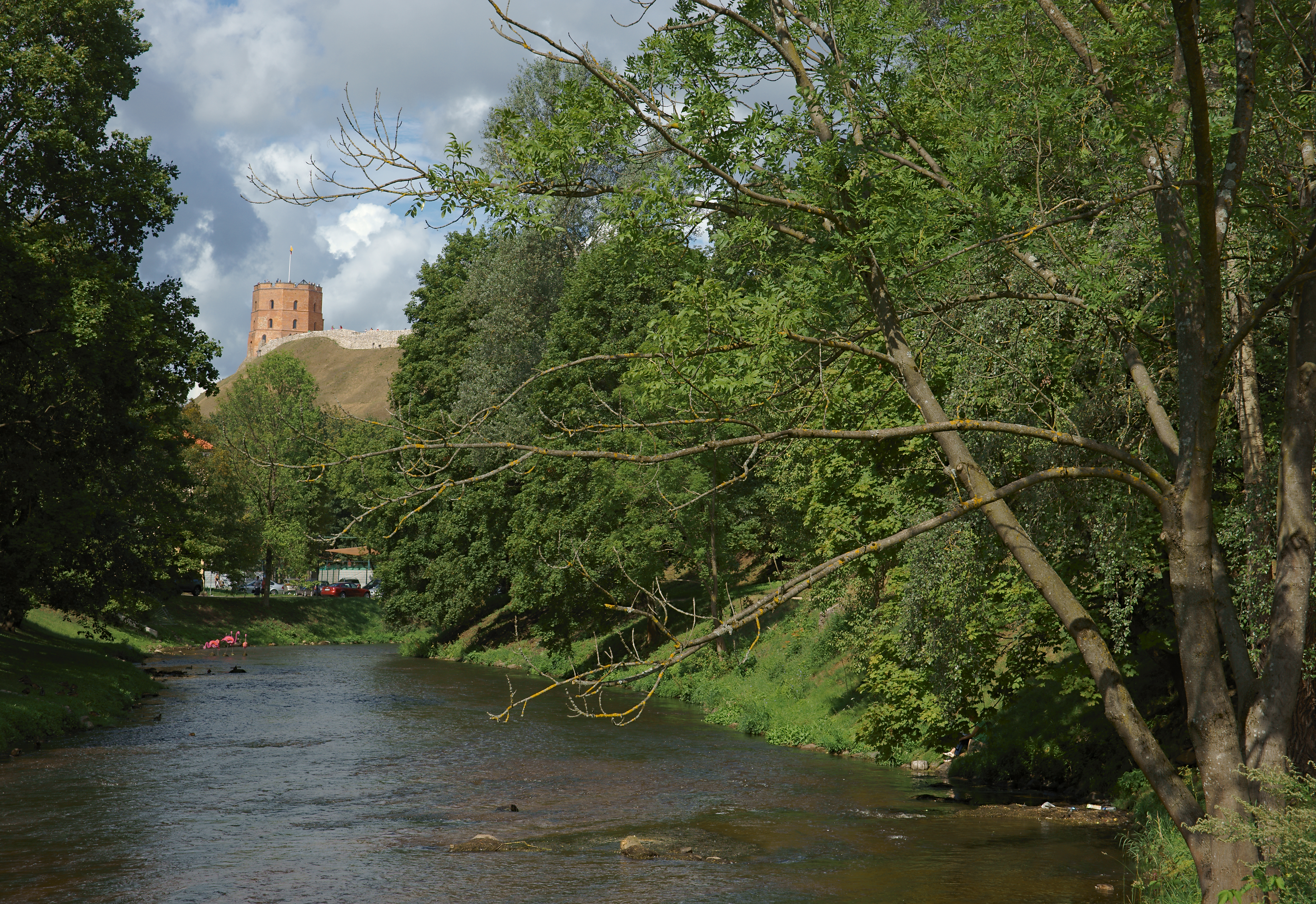
- Vilnia River in Vilnius

Location
- Country: Lithuania, Belarus (along the border)

Physical characteristics
- Source
  - location: 5 km (3.1 mi) south of Šumskas
- Mouth: Neris
  - coordinates: 54.6889°N 25.2926°E
- Length: 79.6 km (49.5 mi)
- Basin size: 623.5 km^{2} (240.7 sq mi)
- Discharge
  - average: 5.63 m^{3}/s (199 cu ft/s)

Basin features
- Progression: Neris→ Neman→ Baltic Sea

The Vilnia (also Vilnelė; Belarusian: Вільня, Vilnia [ˈvʲilʲnʲa]; Polish: Wilejka, Wilenka) is a river primarily running through Eastern Lithuania. Its source is near the villages of Kiemėnai and Vindžiūnai, 6 km south of Šumskas, nearby to the A3–M7 Medininkai–Kamenny Log border crossing complexes of the Belarus–Lithuania border for approximately 12 kilometers.

== Geography ==
The Vilnia is 79.6 km long and its basin covers 624 sq. km. The river's steepness is 124.6 metres from the source to the mouth. For 13 km, its flow marks the Belarus-Lithuania border, and the remaining 69 km are in Lithuania where it flows into the Neris River at Vilnius. Eventually, its waters, via the Neris draining into the Neman River, reach the Baltic Sea. Its confluence with the Neris lies within the city of Vilnius, and the river's name is regarded to have been the source of the city's name.

=== Sources ===
The springs along the Vilnia's length contribute to its flow. Locals refer to the river's starting source as the Holy Stream. A series of wells accessing the river's groundwaters, drilled in the early 20th century, remained a major source of potable water for the city into the late 20th century.

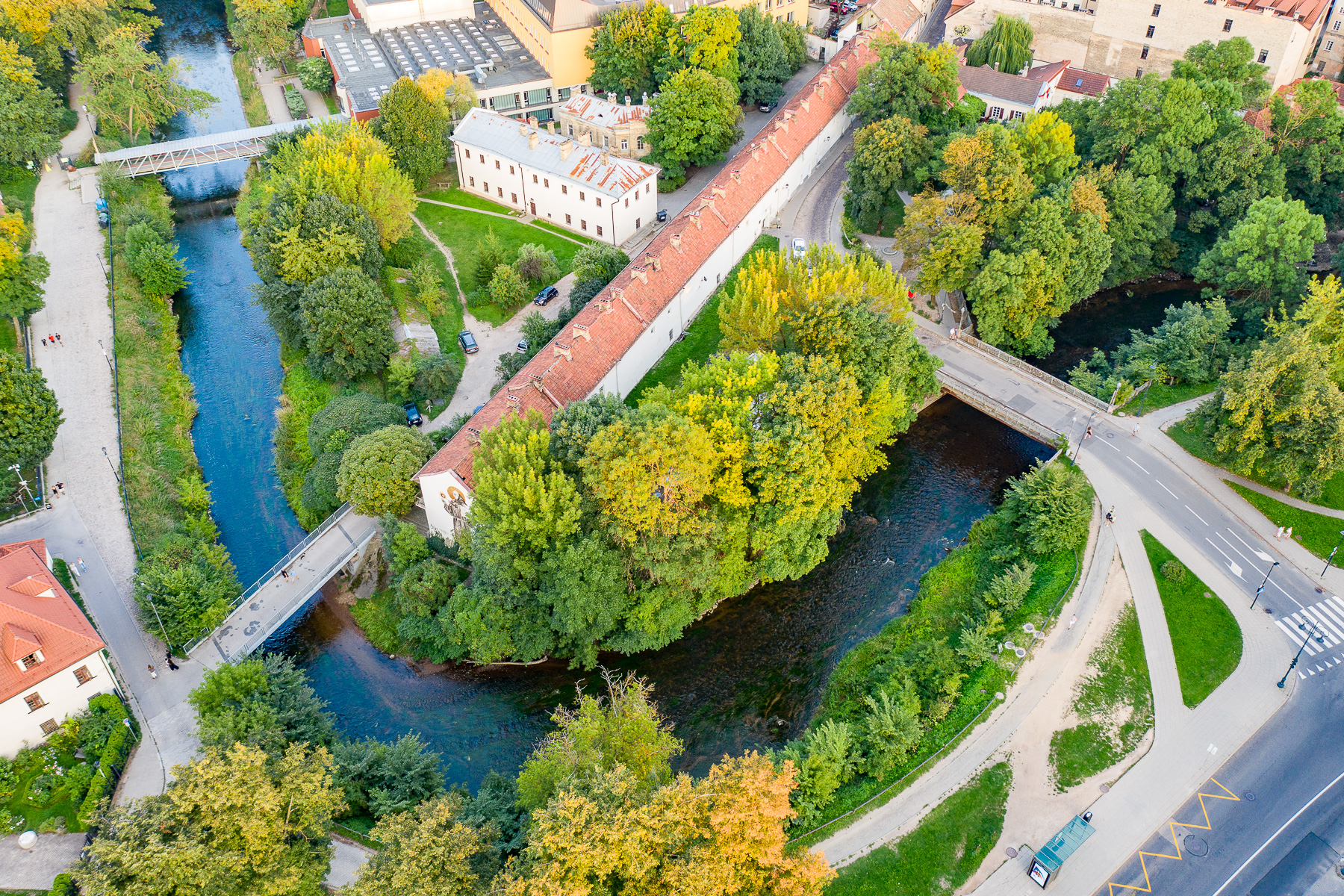
Aerial view of Vilnia, bending around Užupis district.

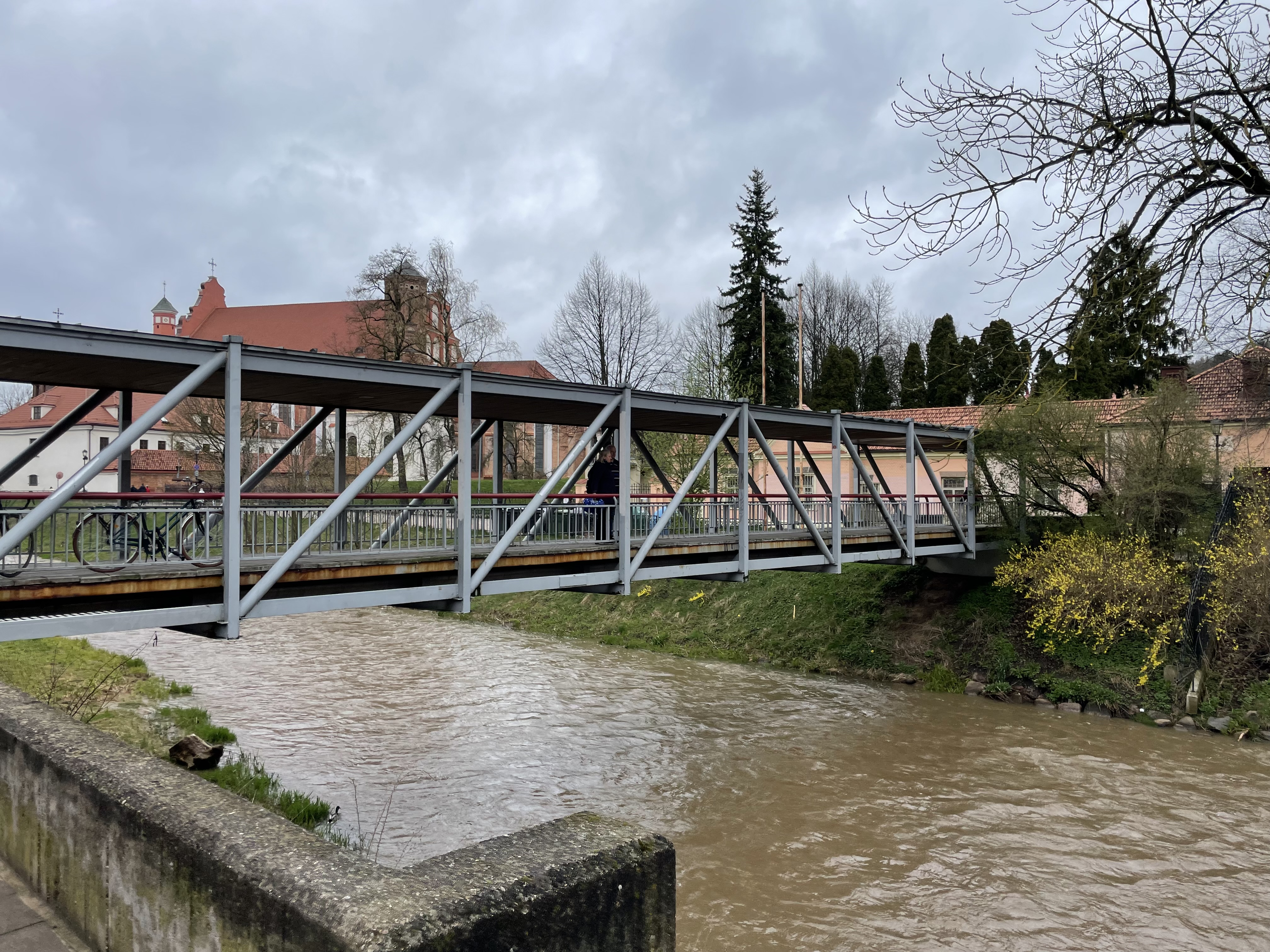
Fluxus Bridge over Vilnia in Užupis.

== Naming ==
The name of the river derives from the Lithuanian language word vilnis ("a surge") or vilnyti ("to surge"). Beneath it stands the Indo-European root wel-/wl- meaning "to roll", "to spin". Vilnelė, the diminutive form of the original hydronym Vilnia, came into popular use in Lithuanian and in Soviet times largely replaced the latter because of Polish language influence — Poles translated Lithuanian name of the river with such diminutive form (Wilenka).

== Fauna ==
Within the river basin, approximately 30 living species of fish and birds have protected status. In an effort to restore the upstream migration of salmonids in the basin, a fish ladder was constructed on the Vilnia in 2000.
