= List of A7 roads =

This is a list of roads designated A7 :

- A007 road (Argentina), a beltway around the city of Santa Fe
- A7 highway (Australia) may refer to:
  - Gregory Highway, a road connecting Georgetown and Springsure
  - Port Road, Adelaide, a road connecting the Adelaide central business district with Port Adelaide
  - West Tamar Highway, a road connecting Launceston and Greens Beach
- A7 motorway (Austria), a road connecting Linz and the Mühlviertel
- A7 motorway (Bulgaria), a road connecting Ruse and Makaza
- A7 motorway (Croatia), a road connecting Rijeka, Croatia to Slovenian border
- A7 motorway (Cyprus), a planned road intended to link Paphos with Polis
- A7 motorway (France), a road connecting Lyon and Marseille
- Bundesautobahn 7, a German road running between that country's border with Denmark to the Austrian border
- A7 motorway (Greece), a road running between Corinth and Kalamata in the Peloponnese
- A7 motorway (Italy), a road connecting Milan and Genoa
- A7 road (Latvia), a road connecting Riga, Bauska and the Lithuanian border
- A7 highway (Lithuania), a road connecting Marijampolė and Kaliningradas
- A7 motorway (Luxembourg), a road connecting Luxembourg City and Clervaux
- A7 road (Malaysia), a road connecting Beaufort and Mempaku/Menumbok
- A7 motorway (Morocco), a road connecting Casablanca and Marrakesh
- A7 motorway (Netherlands), a road connecting Nieuweschans and Amsterdam
- A7 highway (Nigeria), a road connecting Ilorin to the border with Benin
- A7 motorway (Portugal), a road connecting Póvoa de Varzim and Vila Pouca de Aguiar
- A7 motorway (Romania), a road planned to connect Ploiești to the border with Ukraine at Siret
- A-7 motorway (Spain), a road connecting Algeciras to the border with France at La Jonquera
- A 7 road (Sri Lanka), a road connecting Avissawella-Hatton-Nuwara Eliya
- A7 motorway (Switzerland), a road connecting Winterthur and Kreuzlingen
- A7 road (United Kingdom) may refer to:
  - A7 road (Great Britain), a road connecting Edinburgh to Carlisle
  - A7 road (Isle of Man), a road connecting Ballasalla with Port Erin
  - A7 road (Northern Ireland), a road connecting Downpatrick and Carryduff
- A7 road (United States) may refer to:
  - County Route A7 (California), a road in Tehama County connecting Live Oak Road and SR 36 in Red Bluff
- A7 road (Zimbabwe), a road connecting Bulawayo and Victoria Falls

== See also ==
- List of highways numbered 7
- List of highways numbered 7A
- A7 (disambiguation)
