= List of highways numbered 7A =

The following highways are numbered 7A:

== India ==
- National Highway 7A (India)

== United States ==
- Massachusetts Route 7A
- County Route 7A (Scott County, Minnesota)
- New York State Route 7A
  - County Route 7A (Allegany County, New York)
  - County Route 7A (Columbia County, New York)
  - County Route 7A (Nassau County, New York)
  - County Route 7A (Schoharie County, New York)
  - County Route 7A (Ulster County, New York)
- Oklahoma State Highway 7A
- Vermont Route 7A

== See also ==
- List of highways numbered 7
- List of highways numbered A7
- 7A (disambiguation)
