= List of highways numbered 7C =

The following highways are numbered 7C:

== United States ==
- Nebraska Highway 7C (former)
- New York State Route 7C (former)
  - County Route 7C (Allegany County, New York)
- Oklahoma State Highway 7C

== See also ==
- List of highways numbered 7
- 7C (disambiguation)
