= NH7 =

NH7 may refer to:

- NH7 Weekender
- National Highway 7 (India)
- National Highway 44 (India), formerly known as National Highway 7 (until 2010)

== See also ==
- List of highways numbered 7
