= CR7 (road) =

Several roads are labelled CR7:

== Canada ==
=== Ontario ===
- Merlin Road (County Road 7, CR 7), Chatham-Kent; see List of numbered roads in Chatham-Kent
- Hockley Road (County Road 7, CR 7), Dufferin County; see List of numbered roads in Dufferin County
- County Road 7 (CR 7), Essex County; see List of numbered roads in Essex County
- County Road 7 (CR 7), Hastings County; see List of numbered roads in Hastings County
- Elginfield Road (County Road 7, CR 7), Middlesex County; see List of numbered roads in Middlesex County, Ontario
- County Road 7 (CR 7), Simcoe County; see List of numbered roads in Simcoe County
- County Road 7 (CR 7), Wellington County; see List of numbered roads in Wellington County
- County Road 7, United Counties of Prescott and Russell; see List of numbered roads in the United Counties of Prescott and Russell

== United States ==
=== Illinois ===
- Perry Road (County Road 7, CR 7), DeKalb County; see List of county roads in DeKalb County, Illinois
- St. Charles Road (County Road 7, CR 7), DuPage County; see List of county roads in DuPage County, Illinois
- Old Chicago Road (County Road 7, CR 7), Will County; see List of county roads in Will County, Illinois

=== Kansas ===
- County Highway 7 (CR 7), Douglas County; see List of county highways in Douglas County, Kansas

=== Minnesota ===
- County Road 7 (CR 7), Anoka County; see List of county roads in Anoka County, Minnesota
- County Road 7 (CR 7), Goohue County; see List of county roads in Goodhue County, Minnesota
- County Road 7 (CR 7), Kanabec County; see List of county roads in Kanabec County, Minnesota
- County Road 7 (CR 7), St. Louis County; see List of county roads in St. Louis County, Minnesota
- County Road 7 (CR 7), Isanti County; see List of county roads in Isanti County, Minnesota
- County Highway 7 (CR 7), Pine County; see List of county roads in Pine County, Minnesota

=== New Jersey ===
- County Route 7 (CR 7), Monmouth County; see List of county routes in Monmouth County, New Jersey
- Central Avenue (County Route 7, CR 7), Ocean County; see List of county routes in Ocean County, New Jersey

=== New York ===
- Rawson Road (County Route 7, CR 7), Allegany County; see List of county routes in Allegany County, New York
- County Route 7 (CR 7), Cattaraugus County; see List of county routes in Cattaraugus County, New York
- Hendy Creek Road (County Route 7, CR 7), Chemung County; see List of county routes in Chemung County, New York
- Moon Hill Road (County Route 7, CR 7), Chenango County; see List of county routes in Chenango County, New York
- County Route 7 (CR 7), Chautauqua County; see List of county routes in Chautauqua County, New York
- County Route 7 (CR 7), Clinton County; see List of county routes in Clinton County, New York
- County Route 7 (CR 7), Columbia County; see List of county routes in Columbia County, New York
- Cat Hollow Road (County Route 7, CR 7), Delaware County; see List of county routes in Delaware County, New York
- County Route 7 (CR 7), Dutchess County; see List of county routes in Dutchess County, New York
- Savage Road (County Route 7, CR 7), Erie County; see List of county routes in Erie County, New York
- County Route 7 (CR 7), Essex County; see List of highways in Essex County, New York
- Gale Road (County Route 7, CR 7), Franklin County; see List of county routes in Franklin County, New York
- County Route 7 (CR 7), Genesee County; see List of county routes in Genesee County, New York
- Gilboa Road (County Route 7, CR 7), Greene County; see List of county routes in Greene County, New York
- Hope Falls Road (County Route 7, CR 7), Hamilton County; see List of highways in Hamilton County, New York
- County Route 7 (CR 7), Herkimer County; see List of county routes in Herkimer County, New York
- County Route 7 (CR 7), Jefferson County; see List of county routes in Jefferson County, New York
- Hermitage Road (County Route 7, CR 7), Lewis County; see List of county routes in Lewis County, New York
- County Route 7 (CR 7), Livingston County; see List of county routes in Livingston County, New York
- Lewis Point Road (County Route 7, CR 7), Madison County; see List of county routes in Madison County, New York
- Ridge Road (County Route 7, CR 7), Monroe County; see List of county routes in Monroe County, New York
- Truax Road (County Route 7, CR 7), Montgomery County; see List of county routes in Montgomery County, New York
- County Route 7 (CR 7), Nassau County
- Slayton Settlement Road (County Route 7, CR 7), Niagara County; see List of county routes in Niagara County, New York
- County Route 7 (CR 7), Oneida County; see List of county routes in Oneida County, New York
- Jamesville Road (County Route 7, CR 7), Onondaga County; see List of county routes in Onondaga County, New York
- Slack Road (County Route 7, CR 7), Ontario County; see List of county routes in Ontario County, New York
- County Route 7 (CR 7), Orange County; see List of county routes in Orange County, New York
- Johnson Road (County Route 7, CR 7), Oswego County; see List of county routes in Oswego County, New York
- Otsdawa Road (County Route 7, CR 7), Otsego County; see List of county routes in Otsego County, New York
- County Route 7 (CR 7), Resselaer County; see List of county routes in Rensselaer County, New York
- County Route 7 (CR 7), St. Lawrence County; see List of county routes in St. Lawrence County, New York
- South Shore Road (County Route 7, CR 7), Saratoga County; see List of county routes in Saratoga County, New York
- Pearse Road (County Route 7, CR 7), Schenectady County; see List of county routes in Schenectady County, New York
- County Route 7 (CR 7), Schoharie County; see List of county routes in Schoharie County, New York
- Lower Foots Hill Road (County Route 7, CR 7), Schuyler County; see List of county routes in Schuyler County, New York
- County Route 7 (CR 7), Steuben County; see List of county routes in Steuben County, New York
- Wicks Road (County Route 7, CR 7), Suffolk County; see List of county routes in Suffolk County, New York (1–25)
- Halsey Valley Road (County Route 7, CR 7), Tioga County; see List of county routes in Tioga County, New York
- County Route 7 (CR 7), Ulster County; see List of county routes in Ulster County, New York
- Bay Road (County Route 7, CR 7), Warren County; see List of highways in Warren County, New York
- South Bay Road (County Route 7, CR 7), Washington County; see List of county routes in Washington County, New York
- Croton Point Avenue (County Route 7, CR 7), Westchester County; see List of county routes in Westchester County, New York
- County Route 7 (CR 7), Wyoming County; see List of county routes in Wyoming County, New York
- Flynn Road (County Route 7, CR 7), Yates County; see List of county routes in Yates County, New York

== See also ==
- Norwegian County Road 7 (Fv 7; Norwegian: Fylkesvei 7), Vestland County, Norway
- List of highways numbered 7
- CR7 (disambiguation)
- C7 (disambiguation)
- 7 (disambiguation)
