= 7A =

7A or VII-A may refer to:

== Law, legal system ==
- Housing (apartment, rent, landlord, tenant)
  - Article 7A (NYC housing code), an alternative to rent strikes / to expedite repair
- Labor law
  - Los Angeles Garment Workers strike of 1933, National Industrial Recovery Act (NIRA), section 7A, "living wages"
- taxes
  - Rates in Hong Kong, a property tax system known as "rates": Section 7A(2), (3)

== Transportation, navigation ==
- 7A (Long Island bus)
- Air Next IATA airline designator
- British Columbia Highway 7A
- Massachusetts Route 7A
- Vermont Route 7A

== Other ==
- Division 7A dividend, an amount treated by the Australian Tax Office as an assessable dividend of a shareholder of a private company
- Oflag VII-A Murnau, a German prisoner of war camp
- Stalag VII-A, a German prisoner of war camp
- 7A, the production code for the 1986 Doctor Who serial The Mysterious Planet

== See also ==
- A7 (disambiguation)
