= Alpha 7 =

Alpha 7 (α7) or Alpha-7 (α-7) may refer to:

- Alpha-7 nicotinic receptor, a type of nicotinic acetylcholine receptor consisting entirely of α_{7} subunits
- CHRNA7, the α_{7} monomer
- Alpha 7 (Power Rangers), a fictional character from the Power Rangers franchise
- Alpha 7 (Minolta) (α-7), an A-mount 35mm SLR by Minolta in 2000, also known as Dynax 7 / Maxxum 7
- Alpha 7 Limited (α-7 Limited), a limited edition A-mount 35mm SLR by Minolta in 2001, also known as Dynax 7 Limited
- Alpha-7 Digital (α-7D), an A-mount APS-C format DSLR by Konica Minolta in 2004, also known as Dynax 7D / Maxxum 7D (DG-7D)
- Alpha 7 (Sony) (α7), an E-mount full-frame digital camera by Sony in 2013, also known as α ILCE-7
- Alpha 7R (α7R), a high-resolution E-mount full-frame digital camera by Sony in 2013, also known as α ILCE-7R
- Alpha 7S (α7S), a high-sensitivity E-mount full-frame digital camera by Sony in 2014, also known as α ILCE-7S
- Alpha 7 II (α7 II), an E-mount full-frame digital camera by Sony in 2014, also known as α ILCE-7M2
- Alpha 7R II (α7R II), a high-resolution E-mount full-frame digital camera by Sony in 2015, also known as α ILCE-7RM2
- Alpha 7S II (α7S II), a high-sensitivity E-mount full-frame digital camera by Sony in 2015, also known as α ILCE-7SM2

== See also ==
- Sony Alpha NEX-7 (α NEX-7)
- A7 (disambiguation)
- Alpha (disambiguation)
