= A7 =

A7, A.7, A 7, A07 or A-7 may refer to:

== Arts and entertainment ==
=== Music ===
- A^{7}, the A dominant seventh chord used in many rock songs; see dominant seventh chord
- A (musical note)
- A7 (mixtape), by SCH, 2015
- Avenged Sevenfold, a hard rock/metal band

=== Radio stations ===
- Arutz Sheva, an Israeli radio station meaning Channel Seven

== Electronics and software ==
- A7, a type of stereoautograph
- Altec Lansing A-7, a speaker
- Apple A7, a system on a chip used first in the iPhone 5S
- ARM Cortex-A7, a processor in the ARM Cortex-A processor family
- Samsung Galaxy A7, a smartphone
- Sony α7, a family of full-frame mirrorless interchangeable-lens cameras

== Military ==
=== Equipment ===
- A-7 (transceiver), a Soviet VHF radio transceiver developed during World War II
- Skoda 37 mm A7, a tank gun produced before and during World War II by the Skoda Works

=== Groups ===
- A7 (Artillery Regiment)
- A7, the military staff designation in the continental staff system for air force headquarters staff concerned with military training

=== Vehicles ===
- A7, a model of German Aggregate Series Rocket from World War II
- A-7 Corsair II, a Ling-Temco-Vought single engine jet attack aircraft
- Antonov A-7, a World War II Soviet assault glider
- Breda A.7, a 1929 Italian reconnaissance aircraft
- Focke-Wulf A 7, a World War I German aircraft
- Hall-Scott A-7, an early aircraft engine
- HMS A7, an A-class submarine of the Royal Navy
- USS Shark (SS-8), a.k.a. USS A-7, a Plunger-class submarine of the US Navy

== Science ==
- ATC code A07 Antidiarrheals, intestinal anti-inflammatory/anti-infective agents, a subgroup of the Anatomical Therapeutic Chemical Classification System
- British NVC community A7 (Nymphaea alba community), a British Isles plant community
- Noradrenergic cell group A7
- Subfamily A7, a Rhodopsin-like receptors subfamily

== Sports ==
- A7 (classification), an amputee sport classification
- A type of Réti Opening in chess, code A07

== Transportation ==
=== Automobiles ===
- Autobacs Seven, a Japanese sports car manufacturer
- Arrows A7, a British racing car
- Audi A7, a German mid-size coupe
- Geely Galaxy A7, a Chinese mid-size sedan

=== Roads and routes ===
- A7 road, in several countries
- Route A7 (WMATA), a bus route operated by the Washington Metropolitan Area Transit Authority

=== Trains ===
- LNER Class A7, a class of British 4-6-2T steam locomotives

=== Aviation ===
- Air Comet, its IATA airline designator
- Qatar (aircraft registration code prefix A7)

== Other uses ==
- A7, an ISO 216, international standard paper size, 74×105 mm
- A7 (bar), bar in New York City
- Sako A7, a Finnish bolt-action rifle

== See also ==
- Alpha 7 (disambiguation) (α7 / Α7)
- 7A (disambiguation)
