= CR7 (disambiguation) =

CR7 most often refers to the Portuguese footballer Cristiano Ronaldo, in allusion to his initials and shirt number.

CR7 may also refer to:

== Places ==
- Cosmos Redshift 7, a high-redshift galaxy, about 12.9 billion light-years from Earth
- CR7, a postcode district in the CR postcode area of south London, England, UK
- Defu MRT station (MRT station code CR7), Singapore
- CR7 (road), roads called CR7
  - County Route 7 (Nassau County, New York), USA

== Products ==
- CRJ700 (CR7), the 70-seat version of the Canadair Regional Jet (CRJ)
- CR-7(E), last high-end cassette deck by Nakamichi
- Nike CR7, a Nike brand Cristiano Ronaldo line

== Other uses ==
- CR7 Motorsports, a NASCAR race team
- CR7 register, a computer CPU control register
- Callum Robinson (born 1995), Irish footballer, sometimes referred to as "CR7", in allusion to his initials and shirt number

== See also ==
- CR (disambiguation)
