= C7 =

C7, C07 or C-7 may refer to:

== Vehicles (including military) ==
- C-7 Caribou, a military transport aircraft
- AEG C.VII, a World War I German armed reconnaissance aircraft
- AGO C.VII, a World War I German reconnaissance aircraft
- Albatros C.VII, a World War I German military reconnaissance aircraft
- C-7, a United States Navy C class blimp and the first airship inflated with helium
- Chevrolet Corvette (C7), the seventh generation of a sports car made by General Motors
- Fokker C.VII, a 1928 Dutch reconnaissance seaplane
- HMS C7, a British Royal Navy C-class submarine
- Omoda C7, a Chinese compact crossover SUV
- Sauber C7, a 1983 Group C prototype race car
- USS Cincinnati (C-7), a United States Navy protected cruiser

== Science ==
- Caldwell 7 (NGC 2403), a spiral galaxy in Camelopardalis

=== Technology ===
- Nokia C7-00, a touch screen mobile from Nokia
- VIA C7, an IA-32 central processing unit by VIA Technologies
- C7, an incandescent light bulb of the size typically used in nightlights and Christmas lighting usually 2 and 1/8 inches Length, 7/8 inch Width, 5 watts
- IEC 60320 C7, an unpolarized, two pole, mains voltage connector

=== Biology ===
- Cervical vertebra 7 (vertebra prominens), one of the cervical vertebrae of the vertebral column
- Cervical spinal nerve 7
- C7 protein, engineered transcription factors
- Complement component 7, protein encoded by the C7 gene in humans
- Coccinella septempunctata ("C. 7-punctata"), a widespread lady beetle
- ATC code C07 Beta blocking agents, a subgroup of the Anatomical Therapeutic Chemical Classification System
- C07, Malignant neoplasm of parotid gland ICD-10 code

== Entertainment ==
- "C7" (song), a song by Japanese band GO!GO!7188
- C7 Sport, a defunct pay-TV service in Australia
- C_{7}, the C (musical note) three octaves above Middle C in scientific pitch notation
- C^{7}, in music, a C dominant seventh chord

== Communications ==
- C7, CCITT (now ITU-T) (the European term for) Signalling System No. 7, a set of telecom signaling protocols
- C7, Nielsen viewership ratings that include live viewing plus recorded programs watched a week (7 days) later
- C7, broadcasting services of the government of the Mexican state of Jalisco:
  - XEJB (disambiguation), radio
  - XHGJG-TV, television
- Nokia C7-00, a cell phone

== Transport ==
- C7, a road connecting Newhaven and Lewes in East Sussex
- The IATA code for Rico Linhas Aéreas, an airline based in Manaus, Brazil
- LNER Class C7, classified Z or V2 by the NER

== Other ==
- Colt Canada C7 rifle or Diemaco C7, a Canadian derivative of the M16
- C7, an international standard paper size (81×114 mm), defined in ISO 216

== See also ==
- 7C (disambiguation)
