= Highway 7 (Iraq) =

Road in Iraq

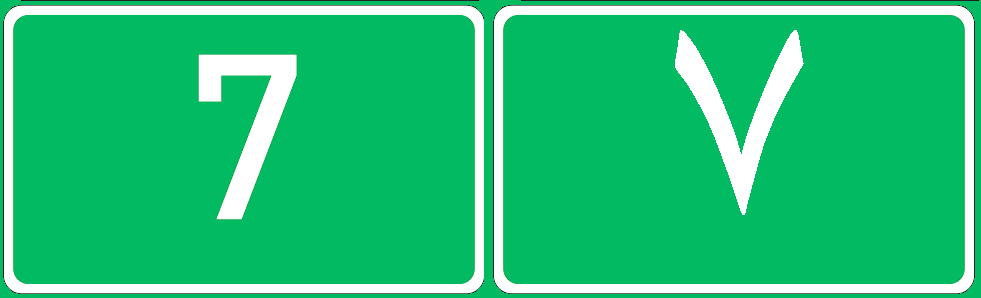
Highway 7
- ٧ طريق رقم

Location
- Country: Iraq

Highway system
- Highways in Iraq

Highway 7 is a highway in Iraq which extends from Al Kut to Nasiriyah.

It runs north–south through Nasiriyah, where it intersects with Habobi Street.
