= Rates in Hong Kong =

Property tax in Hong Kong

A property tax known as "rates" has been levied in Hong Kong since 1845. The tax applies to all domestic and commercial properties unless exempted, and is based upon the rental value of the property, re-assessed each year. Formerly part of the revenue went to the Urban Council and, from 1986, the Regional Council, but since 2000 the whole amount goes to the Hong Kong Government.

The valuation process is the responsibility of the Commissioner of Rating and Valuation, to whom appeals or objections may be submitted. The findings of various legal cases have clarified some aspects of rating law.

== History of rates in Hong Kong ==
=== Introduction ===
Unless specifically exempted under the Rating Ordinance (Chapter 116 of the Laws of Hong Kong), all properties in Hong Kong are liable to rating assessment, with rates payable at a specified percentage of the rateable value assessed on the property. Basically, the rateable value is the estimated market rental value of the property at a designated date.

=== Origin and early development of rating ===
The rating system in Hong Kong has a history of over 160 years. The first Rating Ordinance, Ordinance No. 2 of 1845, was enacted in that year and related to the Police Rate which was collected to pay the expenses for upholding and maintaining the police force in Hong Kong. Over the following thirty years, services funded by rating such as “Lighting Rate”, “Water Rate” and “Fire Brigade Rate”, were expanded by several subsequent Ordinances. The terms “tenement”, “rateable value” and “interim valuation”, which were re-enacted or introduced in the Rating Ordinance 1888, have remained central to rating law in Hong Kong since then.

=== Consolidation of rates ===
Prior to 1931, different percentage charges of rates were imposed according to districts. In 1931 the Government recognised the unsatisfactory nature of the large number of different rates of charge. The absence or presence of amenities in certain localities should have been reflected in the rateable value of the property. Consequently, upon the enactment of Ordinance No. 16 of 1931, a uniform percentage charge of 17% of the rateable value was levied in all rated areas for the services provided by the Government. However, water was still seen to justify separate treatment with a fixed reduction of 1% in the rates percentage charge for premises with unfiltered water supply and 2% for premises with no fresh water supply. In 1984, the basis in calculating water reductions was changed. Reductions based on water supply status were to be calculated at a percentage prescribed by resolution of the Legislative Council of the amount of rates payable. With effect from 1 April 1984, the reductions were set at 7.5% and 15% for unfiltered water supply and no water supply respectively.

=== Urban and Regional Council rates ===
Following the reconstitution of the Urban Council in 1973, rates in the Urban Areas were split into two parts, i.e. “General Rates” to be paid into general revenue and “Urban Council Rates” to be paid to the Urban Council. All rates payable in the New Territories were “General Rates” and paid into general revenue until 1986 when the Regional Council was established.

With effect from 1 April 1986 “Regional Council Rates” was introduced to replace the General Rates and to provide the main source of finance for the newly established Regional Council and were payable in the Regional Council area (i.e. the New Territories). However, the Provision of Municipal Services (Reorganisation) Ordinance abolished the two municipal councils as from 1 January 2000, and since then all rates revenue has become part of the general revenue of the Government.

=== Annual revaluation ===
The earliest Rating Ordinance, in 1845, provided that “the said Governor and Council may cause a new valuation to be made annually”. However, resource constraints made annual revaluations difficult and an amending Ordinance in 1851 introduced the concept of “adoption” of an existing valuation list, thus avoiding the need for annual revaluations. The “adoption” provision remained a feature in the rating system in Hong Kong until 1973, when the requirement for annual valuations was removed. Henceforth a valuation list would remain in force until a new one was declared.

However, the long lapse of time between revaluations had resulted in large increases in rateable values. In November 1998, the Government announced that new valuation lists would be prepared to take effect from 1 April 1999 and revaluations would thereafter be conducted on an annual basis.

=== Extension of rating to the New Territories ===
Rating did not apply to the New Territories until 1935, when a modified form of rating based on the capital value of the buildings was introduced to certain areas (Yuen Long and Tai Po in 1935 and Tai Po in 1937) in the New Territories, where certain benefits were granted in the way of street lighting, drainage, water supply etc.

This special rating system for the New Territories was replaced in 1955 by the extension of the urban rating system. The Rating (Amendment) Ordinance of 1954, through which this change was effected, introduced a lower rate percentage charge for the New Territories to reflect the lesser services provided to the region. Agricultural land and buildings were also exempted under the 1954 Ordinance. The new valuation lists incorporating Tsuen Wan, Kwai Chung and a strip along the Castle Peak Road were declared in 1956.

The 1956/57 valuation list for this small portion of land in the western New Territories was intended to be the first stage of a phased programme which would fairly rapidly extend the urban rating systems to other areas of New Territories. However, no further extension took place until 1974, primarily due to Government's earlier undertaking not to assess traditional village houses and the difficulty in agreeing a satisfactory definition of a village house.

The pace of the New Territories extension was later stepped up, with an amendment Ordinance passed in 1975, providing exemption from rates for agricultural dwellings and village houses in the New Territories effective from 1 April 1976. At the same time, a new “phasing-in” system was established for new Rating Areas. In the first year, rates would be charged at 50% of the standard rate charge for the New Territories, and then raised annually by 10% until 100% was reached in the sixth year.

=== Extension to the remaining areas (1988) ===
The Rating (Areas of Hong Kong) (Amendment) Order 1987 finally extended rating to all remaining areas of the territory with effect from 1 April 1988. Since then, the whole territory of Hong Kong has been subject to rates. Starting from 1990, lists were prepared only for Urban Council (UC) and Regional Council (RC) areas instead of separate valuation lists for the previous 47 Rating Areas. After the dissolving of the Urban and Regional Councils in 2000, a single valuation list was prepared for the whole area of Hong Kong as there was no distinction between UC and RC areas.

== Liability for Rates ==
=== Definition of Tenement ===
Rates are a form of tax levied on occupation of landed property. In Hong Kong, the unit of assessment for rating purposes is a “tenement”, defined in the Rating Ordinance as

“any land (including land covered with water) or any building, structure, or part thereof which is held or occupied as a distinct or separate tenancy or holding or under any licence.”

The definition of “tenement” was considered in detail by the Lands Tribunal in the rating appeal Yiu Lian Machinery Repairing Works Ltd & Ors v Commissioner of Rating and Valuation [1982] HKDCLR 32. The Tribunal observed that the definition consists of two limbs, stating that –

(a) “The first limb concerns the subject matter to be rated, namely, land, buildings and structures” and
(b) “The second limb only makes even those three species of property rateable, if they are held or occupied as a distinct or separate tenancy, holding or licence.”

“Occupied” carries its literal meaning of somebody or something physically using or occupying the land. “Held” implies ownership. “Distinct or separate” defines the conditions under which a tenement can be constituted. “Tenancy” in the definition includes lease and short term tenancy. Occupation under any licence is also rateable.

=== Rateability of Plant and Machinery ===
Section 8 of the Rating Ordinance on “tenements containing machinery” was introduced in 1973. It stipulates which types of machinery are considered as part of the tenement. Section 8A was added into the Rating Ordinance in 1991 to deem certain plant items rateable in their own right. It provided that where any land, building or structure was occupied by any person by means of any plant, such land, building or structure shall be deemed for rating purposes to be a separate tenement, whether or not such land, building or structure is otherwise a tenement. “Plant”, as specified under Section 8A, included cables, ducts, pipelines, railway lines, tramway lines, oil tanks, settings and supports for plant or machinery.

=== Rateability of Advertising Signs ===
Rateability of advertising signs was provided in Section 9 of the Rating Ordinance, first introduced in 1973. The gist of the section is to regard the right to use land for exhibiting advertisements as a separate tenement (and thus rateable) and to include the value of the advertising station in the assessed rateable value of the land. As such, all advertising signs are rateable either as separate tenements or by adding their value to the “host” tenements at which they are situated.

=== Liability for Payment ===
Both the owner and the occupier are liable for rates. In practice, this will depend on the terms of the agreement between the owner and occupier of the property. In the absence of any agreement to the contrary, liability of rates rests with the occupier.

=== Apportionment of Rateable Value and Rates Payable ===
An owner or occupier may apply to the Commissioner of Rating and Valuation (the Commissioner) for an apportionment of the rateable value of a single tenement which comprises several tenements valued together under Section 10 and the Commissioner shall give notice of the apportionment in the specified form. This provision for apportionment may assist the ratepayers or owners in determining the respective share of rates for each of the owners or occupiers of the single tenement.

The apportionment of the rateable value does not constitute a separate rating assessment made under the Rating Ordinance. The single tenement and its rateable value remain as entries in the valuation list. Thus, an objection can be made only to the rateable value of the single tenement.

=== Rates Relief and Concessions ===
Rates relief and concession schemes were introduced in the past to cushion the short term impact of increases in rates payment whilst preserving the long-term equity and integrity of the rating system.

For example, prior to the implementation of annual revaluations in 1999, long periods between general revaluations had resulted in large increases in rateable values, giving rise to a very significant increase in the rates burden and causing hardship to ratepayers. To soften the impact of these increases, a Public Revenue Protection (Rating) Order was made in March 1977 to limit the increases in the amount of rates payable for the years 1977/78 and 1978/79 to not more than one third of the amount of rates payable for the preceding year. This measure was also known as the “Rates Relief Scheme”.

Based on the rationale of the previous relief scheme, Section 19 of the Ordinance was amended in 1984 to provide a mechanism to phase in the effect of infrequent revaluation. The amount of increase in rates payable in any year was limited to not more than a certain percentage, as prescribed by resolution of the Legislative Council, of the amount of rates payable in the preceding year. The increases were limited to not more than 20% for each of the years 1984/85, 1985/86 and 1986/87 in respect of the 1984/85 revaluation. Similar arrangement was made in subsequent years with increase in rates payable capped at 25% for the year 1991/92 and 20% for each of the years 1994/95, 1995/96, 1997/98 and 1998/99.

The relief measure under Section 19 has not been re-employed since the commencement of annual revaluations in 1999, although it remains in the Ordinance. An alternative to the provisions in Section 19 is provided through the refund and exemption powers in Sections 35 and 36 respectively. These powers had been used to provide one-off rebates and concessions on a number of occasions under special circumstances in recent years. The rates paid for the April to June quarter in 1998 were refunded to ratepayers and rates payments for the July to September quarter in 1999 were reduced by half. Ratepayers were given rates concession, by way of exemption from payment, up to $2,000 per assessment for the period 1 January 2002 to 31 December 2002, with the ceiling subsequently raised to $5,000 per assessment effective from 1 April 2002. In 2003, rates concession equivalent to the rates payable for the July to September quarter, subject to a maximum amount of $1,250 for each domestic property and $5,000 for each non-domestic property were given to ratepayers. Similar rates concessions were granted in the years 2007/08, 2008/09, 2009/10, 2010/11 and 2011/12 with varying ceilings in the exempted amount as to provide relief or share the economic prosperity with the public.

== Collection and Recovery of Rates ==
=== Collector of Rates ===
On 1 July 1995, the Commissioner of Rating and Valuation took over from the Director of Accounting Services (Head of the Treasury) the responsibilities of Collector of Rates in order to provide an improved one-stop service to ratepayers. The Collector of Rates’ functions include issuing demands for rates, maintaining rates accounts and ratepayers’ details, and recovering rates arrears.

The Treasury, however, continued to undertake the physical collection of rates via their Treasury sub-offices located throughout Hong Kong. These collection services were outsourced in October 2001 to Hongkong Post as were all rates payments by postal remittance from April 2003. The Rating and Valuation Department is directly responsible for the administration of the various electronic payment methods available to ratepayers.

=== Demands and Payments ===
Rates are payable quarterly in advance in the first month of each quarter, i.e. January, April, July and October of every year. The Rating Ordinance also provides for payment at such other frequency as may be determined by the Commissioner. In addition to issuing quarterly demands for rates to all ratepayers, the Commissioner is required to place a notice in the Government Gazette on a quarterly basis, notifying the due date and the manner in which the payment of rates is to be made.

A variety of payment methods are available to ratepayers, including autopay banking service, Payment by Phone Service (PPS), Automated Teller Machine (ATM), E-Pay Station or Internet, or by post, or in person at 126 post offices (except mobile post offices). In 2010/11, some 56% of rates payments were made by electronic means (including autopay), 40% paid in person and 4% settled by post.

=== Apportionment and Set-off ===
The requirement for apportionment and set-off for rates payments arises in a number of circumstances, and the Commissioner is empowered to make such arrangements for the efficient collection of rates and the convenience of ratepayers. Some examples of such arrangements are set out below:

- An apportionment of the rates liability between the vendor and the purchaser of a property;
- An apportionment of the rateable value of a tenement which is valued together with other tenements under Section 10 of the Ordinance; or
- If there are structural alterations or any split or amalgamation of existing tenements, it will require the deletion of the existing assessments and the raising of new assessments (i.e. deletion and interim valuation). If such actions are to take retrospective effect, they will involve refund of rates already paid and the ratepayer will be invited to opt for a set-off arrangement.

=== Surcharges and Recovery of Arrears ===
Any rates not paid by the due date may be subject to a surcharge of 5%. If rates are still unpaid after 6 months from the date when they were deemed to be in default, a further surcharge of 10% on the total amount outstanding may be added. Before taking any legal action to recover arrears of rates, a warning letter will be issued to the defaulter to demand immediate payment. Legal action for recovery of rates is taken in the Small Claims Tribunal if the amount of rates arrears does not exceed $50,000 or in the District Court if the arrears exceed $50,000. If the outstanding rates remain unsettled after the court's judgment, the Commissioner may, as a last resort, enter a charge against the property to prohibit it from changing hands until the charge is released.

=== Rates Refund due to Vacancy ===
Prior to 1973, unoccupied properties were entitled to a full refund of the rates paid. Effective from 1973, vacant properties could only enjoy a 50% refund of the rates. In late 1973, vacancy refund for domestic properties was abolished. Refund for non-domestic vacant properties was eventually removed on 1 July 1995. Thereafter, refund of rates is not allowed for vacant properties unless they are vacated as a result of a Government initiated court order. Refunds are also allowed for vacant open land, providing it is not used for the parking of motor vehicles.

=== Refund of Overpayment of Rates ===
The Commissioner shall refund any amount paid in respect of rates (including surcharges) if he is satisfied that –

(a) the rates were charged otherwise than in accordance with the valuation list, e.g. the rateable value of a tenement was reduced as a result of a review of objection or proposal;

(b) the tenement was exempted during any period;

(c) the tenement has become unoccupied or incapable of occupation, as a result of any order made by a court on the application of the Government;

(d) rates were paid in respect of a period subsequent to the effective date of deletion of an assessment; or

(e) the person who made a payment in respect of rates was not liable to make that payment.

=== Rates Refund Ordered by the Chief Executive ===
The Chief Executive may order a refund of any amount of rates paid, including any surcharges thereon due to default in payment, notwithstanding any other provisions in the Ordinance. In 1998, as one of the special relief measures to address the impact of the Asian financial crisis at that time, the Chief Executive ordered a refund to all ratepayers of the rates paid for the April to June 1998 quarter.

=== Appeal against Refusal to Refund ===
Any person aggrieved by the Commissioner's refusal to refund rates may appeal against such refusal to the District Court. The District Court has jurisdiction to hear and determine any action for the recovery of any sum which is declared by any enactment to be recoverable as a civil debt if the amount claimed does not exceed $1,000,000. The District Court is empowered to adjudicate an appeal even if the amount of refund claimed exceeds the jurisdiction of the District Court.

== Basis of Rating Assessment ==
=== Principle of Assessment ===
Rateable value, the basis of assessment, is defined in Section 7(2) of the Rating Ordinance as: “...an amount equal to the rent at which the tenement might reasonably be expected to let, from year to year, if –

(a) the tenant undertook to pay all usual tenant’s rates and taxes; and

(b) the landlord undertook to pay the Government rent, the costs of repairs and insurance and any other expenses necessary to maintain the tenement in a state to command that rent.”

Rateable value is in effect the estimated annual rental value in the open market. It is common practice supported by decided cases to assume a hypothetical tenancy, and the rateable value is an estimated annual rent which would have been agreed between a hypothetical landlord and a hypothetical tenant, on the assumption that the property in its actual physical state was vacant and to let. The landlord’s obligation to bear “the costs of repairs and other expenses necessary to maintain the tenement in a state to command that rent” implies that ordinary disrepair is disregarded in ascertaining the rateable value. However, serious disrepair which cannot be remedied or can only be remedied at an uneconomic cost should be taken into account.

=== Tone of the List ===
‘Tone of the list” was introduced into rating law in Hong Kong in 1973. This legislation was based on the concept that the rateable value resulting from an interim valuation shall not exceed the level of rateable value in the valuation list. This concept allowed a rateable value to be determined at a level below the “tone” if there was a decline in rental levels during the period from the date the valuation list came into force to the time of the interim valuation.

=== Valuation Reference Date ===
The tone of list provision was amended in 1981 to provide that the rateable value was to be ascertained by reference to the value as at a designated date known as the “relevant date”. General changes in value after the relevant date are not material, so any increase or reduction in value since that date would not affect the rateable values. In recent years, the relevant date has been fixed at 1 October for the Valuation List to take effect on 1 April in the following year, i.e. the relevant date for the 2011/12 Valuation List would be 1 October 2010.

=== The Rebus Sic Stantibus Principle ===
Hong Kong has adopted one of the main principles in UK rating law, the rule of rebus sic stantibus, a Latin phrase meaning “as things stand”. It is embodied in Section 7A(2) and (3) of the Rating Ordinance. This requires that the tenement must be valued on the assumption that at the relevant date,

- the physical state and the actual use of the tenement,
- any relevant factors affecting the mode or character of occupation,
- the occupation and use of other premises in the locality, the transport services and other facilities and amenities in the locality

were the same as they were at a second statutory date, i.e.:
(a) for the purposes of a general revaluation, the date at which the valuation list comes into force (1 April in that year);
(b) for the purposes of an interim valuation, the date of service of Notice of Interim Valuation.

=== Methods of Valuation ===
The following three valuation approaches, which have gained clear judicial recognition, are normally employed to value properties for rating purposes.

==== Valuation by Reference to Rents (Rental Comparison Method) ====
The great majority of properties are valued by reference to rents. Where open market rental evidence exists for the subject property or similar properties, and that evidence conforms to the statutory definition of rateable value, or can be made to do so without such substantial adjustments that its reliability is affected, a valuation based upon such evidence will always be the preferred method.

==== Valuation by Reference to Receipts and Expenditure (Receipts & Expenditure Method) ====
In the absence of rental evidence, recourse may be had to trading receipts and expenditure as an indication of the rent which the occupier might reasonably be expected to pay if he were to rent the property. There must be a profit motive on the part of the occupier of the premises being valued and there is an assumption that such business cannot be carried out in alternative premises. This valuation method may be applicable to properties such as public utilities, hotels, cinemas, etc.

This method comprises taking the gross receipts, which should be determined by taking into account the fair maintainable receipts to be derived from occupation of the property, and deducting the proper cost of purchases to arrive at the gross profit. From the gross profit the working expenses should be deducted to determine the Divisible Balance. The Divisible Balance is the sum available to be shared between the landlord and the tenant. It comprises two main elements: the tenant's share and the landlord's share i.e. the rent payable for the property. Under this approach, the tenant's share may be regarded as the first claim upon the divisible balance, although the position of both the landlord and the tenant must be considered. This share has to be sufficient to induce the tenant to take a tenancy of the property and to provide a proper reward to achieve profit, an allowance for risk and a return upon the tenant's capital.

==== Valuation by Reference to Costs (Contractor’s Method) ====
This method of valuation can be adopted for tenements which are rarely let, hence rental evidence is normally not available, and in respect of which the receipts and expenditure method is considered inappropriate. This valuation method may be applicable to properties such as oil depots, golf courses, recreation clubs and other similar tenements.

The contractor's method assumes the construction of a hypothetical alternative equivalent to the tenement being valued with all costs, including land acquisition costs and fees, taken as at the valuation reference date with appropriate adjustments for age and obsolescence. It assumes that a hypothetical tenant would be willing to pay in rent the decapitalised equivalent cost of providing this hypothetical alternative. In Hong Kong, the practice in the application of the Contractor's Basis is to use the financial market rate or the property market yield to decapitalise the effective capital value to arrive at the annual value as defined in Section 7(2) of the Rating Ordinance.

==== Choice of Valuation Method ====
The choice of valuation method will not always be clear and it is often the case that a second method will be used to test the results of the initial valuation where appropriate data is available for this purpose. In adopting the Receipts and Expenditure Method or the Contractor's Method, the important final valuation step for the valuer must always be to stand back and examine the outcome to ensure it is reasonable as a value for the tenement as it stands, having considered the viewpoints of both the hypothetical landlord and the hypothetical tenant.

== General Revaluations ==
Rental levels for different types of property and for properties in different locations may change over time by varying amounts due to many factors, including economic, social and demographic changes which affect property values. It is important that the rateable values, on which rates are charged, are updated regularly to reflect changes in market rental values in order to provide a sound and equitable tax base. General revaluations are to redistribute the total rates liability fairly amongst ratepayers according to the prevailing rental levels of the properties they occupy.

Prior to 1999, revaluations were normally carried out every three years or longer. Since 1999, general revaluations have been conducted on an annual basis to ensure that all rateable values in the valuation list are up-to-date and rates are charged equitably according to prevailing market rentals.

=== Designated Valuation Reference Date ===
All tenements in a new valuation list, including those subsequently assessed by interim valuation, will be assessed by reference to a valuation reference date to ensure uniformity in assessment levels and fairness to all ratepayers. This valuation reference date is designated by the Chief Executive.

The practice since 1999 has been to designate the valuation reference date as 1 October in the year preceding the date on which a new valuation list is to take effect.

=== Preparation of a New Valuation List ===
There are four main stages in conducting a general revaluation:

==== Collection of Rental Information ====
For revaluation purposes, a large number of requisition forms (Forms R1A) are sent to ratepayers to collect rental information for all types of properties around the designated valuation reference date. Ratepayers are required to complete and return these forms to the Rating and Valuation Department within 21 days. Any person who knowingly makes a false statement or refuses to furnish the particulars requested is guilty of an offence and may be liable for prosecution.

Since July 2005, ratepayers have also been able to complete and submit these forms electronically (Form e-R1A). The electronic submission of forms provides an efficient, convenient and user-friendly service as an alternative to the conventional method of submitting a form by post or in person.

==== Analysis of Rental Information ====
The rents reported by ratepayers must be adjusted to accord with the definition of rateable value under Section 7(2) of the Rating Ordinance. The net rent so derived should be exclusive of rates, management fees and air-conditioning charges. Rent will also be adjusted to account for the difference in time between the rent commencement date and the valuation reference date, to reflect any rent-free periods and to deduct any other charges such as for the hire of furniture during the lease term. This adjusted rental information will be scrutinised and analysed by valuation staff.

==== Review of Rateable Values ====
In addition to the requirement of valuing tenements as at the valuation reference date, the Rating Ordinance provides that the rateable value be ascertained on the assumptions that

(a) the tenement was in the same state as at the time the list comes into force;

(b) any relevant factors affecting the mode or character of occupation were those subsisting at the time the list comes into forces; and

(c) the locality in which the tenement is situated was in the same state, with regard to other premises situated in the locality, the occupation and use of those premises, the transport services and other facilities available in the locality and other matters affecting the amenities of the locality, as at the time the list comes into force.

Therefore, if the valuation reference date is 1 October and the date the list comes into force is 1 April of the following year, the valuer is required to assess the rateable value as at 1 October assuming the same physical state of the tenement as at the next 1 April. General changes in rental values after the designated valuation reference date will not be taken into account.

The majority of tenements such as residential premises, offices and flatted factories are valued by the rental comparison method. Certain types of tenements, such as hotels, cinemas, schools, public utilities, etc. which are special in nature, are reviewed and assessed manually by other methods of valuation like receipt and expenditure method and contractor method.

==== Declaration and Public Inspection of the Valuation List ====
Upon completion of the revaluation exercise, a valuation list containing the descriptions and new rateable values of all assessed tenements will be prepared by the Commissioner. The Commissioner is required to sign a declaration that, to the best of her knowledge and belief, the list contains a true account of the address, description and rateable value of every tenement included therein. The declaration is usually done in March for the new list to take effect on 1 April. Following its declaration, the valuation list is made available for public inspection until the end of May of the year in which it comes into force. From 2005 onwards, the valuation list has been prepared in digital format only. The public can view the entries in both English and Chinese formats in the new valuation list at the Department's website <http://www.rvd.gov.hk>. The valuation list, as amended from time to time, remains in force until a new list becomes effective.

== Maintenance of the Valuation List ==
=== Updating the Valuation List ===
The valuation list contains the descriptions and rateable values of all tenements that have been assessed to rates. The Commissioner of Rating and Valuation has the duty to maintain and update the list by means of deletions, interim valuations and corrections.

==== Deletions ====
The Commissioner may at any time delete from a valuation list any tenement on the following grounds:

(a)there has been structural alteration to the tenement;

(b)the tenement comprises two or more tenements that –

- (i)were previously valued together as a single tenement; and
- (ii)in the opinion of the Commissioner should be valued as separate tenements;

(c)the tenement –

- (i)was previously valued as a separate tenement; and
- (ii)in the opinion of the Commissioner should be valued together with another tenement as a single tenement;

(d)the tenement or part of it ceases to be liable for assessment to rates.

==== Interim Valuations ====
The Commissioner may at any time make an interim valuation of a tenement which is not included in a valuation list and is liable for assessment to rates. This applies mainly to newly completed tenements or tenements which have undergone structural alterations.

==== Corrections ====
The Commissioner may alter a valuation list in force by way of correction of:
(a) a misdescription or clerical or arithmetical error; or
(b) a misdescription resulting from a change of building number or street name notified in the Gazette or from the allocation of building numbers under Section 32 of the Buildings Ordinance.

=== Notices of Deletion, Interim Valuation and Correction ===
The Commissioner will serve a notice in the specified form on the owner or the occupier of the tenement subject to a deletion, an interim valuation or a correction. In the case of an interim valuation or a correction, no rates shall be recoverable by the Commissioner in respect of the tenement until a notice of interim valuation or a notice of correction has been served. Where a correction is made to correct a misdescription resulting from a change of building number or street name, or allocation of building number under the Buildings Ordinance, there is no right of objection against the correction and rates remain payable.

=== Effective Dates ===
The notices of deletion, interim valuation or correction must specify the date on which the respective action becomes effective.

==== The effective date of deletion ====
The effective date of deletion is the date from which rates shall cease to be chargeable e.g. the date of demolition of the building.

==== The effective date of interim valuation ====
There are provisions governing determination of the effective date of an interim valuation. The effective date from which rates becomes payable for any tenement is:

(a) where the tenement falls within the application of the Rating (Effective Date of Interim Valuation) Regulation, the date so specified in the Regulation;

(b) in the case of any other tenement, the date on which the tenement was first occupied; or

(c) such other date as the Commissioner may, in any particular case, determine.

The Rating (Effective Date of Interim Valuation) Regulation applies to newly completed buildings by reference to the relevant documents which allow the property to be occupied. If the tenement is used wholly or primarily for residential purposes, the effective date is 90 days from the date of issue of the relevant document. If the tenement is used for non-residential purposes, the effective date is 180 days from the date of issue of the document, or the date on which the tenement was first occupied, whichever is the earlier. However, if the non-residential tenement was occupied before the issue of the relevant document, the effective date is the date of occupation. In this context, a relevant document means an Occupation Permit issued by the Building Authority, a Certificate of Compliance issued by the Director of Lands or a document signed by the Director of Housing certifying completion of a building erected by the Hong Kong Housing Authority.

==== The effective date of correction ====
The effective date of a correction shall, in the case of a correction of misdescription or clerical or arithmetical error, be the date specified in the notice and in the case of a correction resulting from a change of building number or street name, shall be the effective date of the change.

== Proposals, Objections and Appeals ==
Any aggrieved person can serve on the Commissioner of Rating and Valuation a “proposal” to alter an entry in a new valuation list or an “objection” against a correction, deletion or addition to an existing valuation list. If that person is not satisfied with the Commissioner's decision arising from the proposal or objection, he can lodge an appeal with the Hong Kong Lands Tribunal. The judgment of the Lands Tribunal on valuation matters shall be final but further appeal on any points of law can be made to the law courts.

=== Proposals ===
Any person who is aggrieved by an entry in the valuation list can serve a proposal in the specified form on the Commissioner for alteration of the valuation list from 1 April of that year. Although the Ordinance requires that the proposal must be served within the months of April and May, there is provision for the Commissioner to accept proposals served on him at any time after the declaration of the list in March and before 1 June in the same year. The person making the proposal must be aggrieved on one of the following grounds:

(a) that a tenement for which he is liable to pay rates has been valued above its proper rateable value;

(b) that a tenement included in a valuation list ought to be omitted therefrom;

(c) that a tenement which ought to be included in a valuation list has been omitted therefrom; or

(d) that a tenement included in a valuation list has been valued below its proper rateable value.

If the person serving the proposal is neither the owner nor the occupier of the tenement, he must also serve copies of the proposal on both the owner and occupier, and must notify the Commissioner of such service within the months of April and May of that year. Within 14 days of service, the owner or occupier may send comments on the proposal to the Commissioner and the person serving the proposal.

Upon receiving a valid proposal, the Commissioner will review the assessment and may confirm or alter the entry in the valuation list. The decision must be issued before 1 December immediately following the making of the proposal of a revaluation year or within such other time as the Chief Executive may direct.

=== Objections ===
Whenever the Commissioner serves a notice of an amendment to a valuation list by way of a correction, a deletion or an interim valuation, an aggrieved owner or occupier may, within 28 days, serve on the Commissioner a notice of objection in the specified form stating fully the grounds of objection, i.e. (a) the proposed correction is wrong; or (b) the tenement to be deleted ought not to be deleted; or (c) the tenement which is subject to interim valuation is valued above its proper rateable value or is not liable for assessment to rates.

After considering a valid objection, the Commissioner shall confirm, vary or set aside the interim valuation, the deletion or the correction to the valuation list. He is required to issue his decision on the objection within six months after the expiration of the 28-day objection period.

=== Withdrawal and Agreement ===
At any time before the Commissioner issues a notice of decision, the person making a proposal or objection may withdraw it in writing. Alternatively, such person and any person served with a copy of the proposal may agree with the Commissioner to alter the valuation list or to confirm, vary or set aside the interim valuation, deletion or correction. The agreement or notice of decision issued by the Commissioner in such cases shall be in the specified form.

The Commissioner does not have the power to alter the assessment of a tenement which is not subject to a valid proposal or objection. Therefore, it might arise that similar assessments in a building which are not contested may be valued at different levels after review of proposals or objections in respect of other assessments in the same building. Such inconsistencies will be rectified in the subsequent general revaluation.

=== Appeals ===
A person who is dissatisfied with the Commissioner's decision in respect of a proposal or objection may appeal to the Lands Tribunal. The appeal must be lodged with the Tribunal within 28 days of service of the notice of decision. A copy of the notice of the appeal must also be served on the Commissioner within the same period. If the appellant is neither the owner nor the occupier of the tenement, he must also serve copies of the notice of appeal on the owner and occupier, both of whom may be heard on the hearing of the appeal. Grounds of appeal are confined to those stated in the proposal or objection. However, the Lands Tribunal may allow new facts to be raised at the hearing provided they fall within the stated grounds of the proposal or objection. The onus of proof is upon the appellant to show that the rateable value is incorrect.

The decision of the Tribunal is final on issues of valuation and findings of fact. Further appeals can only be on points of law to the Court of Appeal and eventually to the Court of Final Appeal.

=== Rates Payable ===
Notwithstanding any outstanding proposal, objection or appeal, rates must continue to be paid as demanded. Any overpayment resulting from a reduction of the rateable value will be adjusted in subsequent rates demands.

== Rates Exemptions ==
=== Introduction ===
Section 36 of the Rating Ordinance authorises exemptions from liability for rates. Section 36(1) exempts specific classes of tenement from assessment to rates whereas sections 36(2) and 36(3) give the Governor-in-Council, and the Governor, respectively, power to exempt classes of tenements or areas, and individual tenements from payment of rates. If a tenement is exempt from assessment to rates it will not be included in the valuation list whereas if it is exempt from payment of rates it will be included in the list but rates will not be charged.

=== Exemption from Assessment ===
The statutory provisions under which tenements are exempted from assessment to rates are contained in Section 36(1) of the Rating Ordinance. The tenements which are exempt from assessment to rates are:

- Agricultural land and buildings (Section 36(1)(a))
- New Territories dwelling houses occupied in connection with agricultural land or agricultural operations (Section 36(1)(b))
- New Territories village houses within designated areas, complying with the prescribed size, height and type criteria (Section 36(1)(c))
- Tenements built for the purpose of public religious worship and used wholly or mainly for such purpose (Section 36(1)(d))
- Cemeteries and crematoria (Section 36(1)(e))
- Properties owned and occupied for public purposes by the Government, the Legislative Council Commission or the Financial Secretary Incorporated (Section 36(1)(f))
- Properties owned by the Government and occupied as dwellings by public officers by virtue of their employment (Section 36(1)(g))
- Properties owned by the Housing Authority and occupied for public purposes by the Government (Section 36(1)(h))
- Military land (Section 36(1)(i))
- Certain resited village houses in the New Territories (Section 36(1)(j))
- Properties occupied for domestic purposes in cottage areas or temporary housing areas (Section 36(1)(k))
- Properties of which the rateable value would not exceed the prescribed amount ($3,000 since 1 April 1997) (Section 36(1)(l))

=== Exemption from Payment ===
Exemption from payment of rates is provided under Section 36(2) and (3) of the Rating Ordinance.

Under S.36(2), the Chief Executive in Council may, by order, declare any class of tenements, or parts thereof, or any part of Hong Kong to be exempted from the payment of rates wholly or in part. The Rating (Miscellaneous Exemptions) Order 1981 made under S.36(2) widened the exemption provisions already provided in the principal Ordinance, by exempting the following classes of tenements from payment of rates:

(a) all tenements, or parts thereof, used wholly or mainly for public religious worship, other than those exempt from assessment under Section 36(1). (This provision gives exemption to non-purpose-built premises.)

(b) all tenements, or parts thereof, occupied for public purposes by or on behalf of the Government or the Financial Secretary Incorporated (FSI) other than those exempt from assessment under Section 36(1). (This provision gives exemption to premises which are occupied but not owned by Government or FSI.)

(c) all tenements, or parts thereof, held by the Government and occupied or to be occupied as dwellings by public officers by virtue of their employment other than those exempt from assessment under Section 36(1). (This provision gives exemption to non-Government owned premises used as Government quarters.)

Rating (Exemption) Orders made in 2003, 2007, 2008, 2009, 2010 and 2011 under S.36(2) formed the basis of the rates concessions granted in the years.

Section 36(3) further authorises the Chief Executive to exempt any tenement or part of any tenement from the payment of rates, wholly or in part. This exemption provision is limited to particular tenements, and not classes of tenements. This provision is used for the exemption of consular premises and residences of accredited consular officers, as well as certain village houses situated outside designated village areas in the New Territories and occupied by an indigenous villager. The rates concession granted to all tenements in Hong Kong for the period 1 January 2002 to 31 December 2002 and the additional concession for the period 1 April 2002 to 31 December 2002 were also made under this subsection.

== Summary of Rating Case Law ==
Admissible Facts
Cheung Fat-Fan and Fu Ah-kum v CRV [1977] HKLTLR 218
Grounds of appeal are confined to the grounds of proposal or objection. New facts in support of the grounds stated are however allowed at the hearing.

Burden of Proof
United Theatres Corp. Ltd. v CRV [1978] HKLTLR 298
Kader Industrial Co. Ltd. v CRV [1958] DCLR 207
The onus is on the appellant to prove that the Commissioner is wrong.

Contractor's Test – Decapitalisation Rate
Mobil Oil Hong Kong Ltd. v CRV [1991] HKDCLR 77
Property market yield was accepted to determine the decapitalisation rate.

Controlled Rents
Poplar Assessment Committee v Roberts [1922] 2 AC 93
The House of Lords held, by a majority, that the operation and effect of the Rent Restriction Act 1920 was not to be taken into account in arriving at the valuation of the premises.

Hoey Fook Cheung & Hoey Fook Hong v CRV DC MP 94/73
Wei Che-Yan v CRV [1977] HKLTLR 192
Controlled rents were ignored when valuing a tenement for rating purposes. This followed the UK House of Lords decision in Poplar Assessment Committee v Roberts.

Elemental Approach
Kwong Fat Loong Shipyard v CRV [1990] HKDCLR 5
The tribunal accepted the respondent's elemental approach of valuation by dividing the tenement into four elements and using the comparative method to value three of those elements and the contractor's method for the remaining slipway.

Government Lease Restrictions
Lee King v CRV RA130/77
CRV v Lai Kit Lau Mutual Aid Committee and Another [1986] HKLR 93
Government lease restrictions and conditions other than statutory restrictions should be ignored in rating assessments.

Illegal Extensions
Cheung Man Yee v CRV RA 41/84
Value of illegal extension was included in the assessment of the rateable value, but the value must reflect the calculated risks incurred by the hypothetical landlord and hypothetical tenant.

Lands Tribunal's Jurisdiction
Yiu Lian Machinery Repairing Works Ltd. & Others v Attorney General HC MP 179-181/80
Lands Tribunal has jurisdiction to decide appeals. Attempt to take appeal direct to High Court failed.

Rateability of Contractor's Hut
London County Council v Wilkins (VO) [1957] AC 362
Builder's huts intended to remain in position for 12 to 18 months, having sufficient permanence and not being of too transient in nature, were held rateable by the House of Lords.

Rateable Occupation
Westminster City Council v Southern Railway Co., Railway Assessment Authority and W. H. Smith & Son Ltd. [1936] AC 511
Bookstalls, chemist's shop, kiosks, etc. within the area of railway station let under leases or licences were held to be capable of separate assessment and therefore not to be part of the railway hereditament.

Hing Hon Road Landlord and Tenant Association Ltd. v CRV [1978] HKLTLR 1
The Lands Tribunal held that all the four ingredients of rateable occupation were present and the appellant was in rateable occupation of the car parking spaces in Hing Hon Road, a private cul-de-sac.

Rebus Sic Stantibus Principle
Fir Mill Ltd. v Royton UDC and Jones (VO) [1960] 7 RRC 171
In connection with the assessment of cotton spinning mills and weaving sheds, the Lands Tribunal held that the premises must be valued as available for any industrial use, and not only for the use as spinning or weaving sheds. The Tribunal said:
“A dwelling house must be assessed as a dwelling house, a shop as a shop, but not as any particular kind of shop; a factory as a factory, but not as any particular kind of factory.”

Dawkins (VO) v Ash Brothers & Heaton, Ltd. [1969] AC 366
It was held by the House of Lords that a future event such as the demolition order in the subject case, being a fact and which was essential to and not accidental to the hereditament itself, should be taken into account in arriving at the assessment.

Midland Bank Ltd. v Lanham (VO) [1978] RA 1
The Lands Tribunal seemed to have applied a much wider meaning to the words “mode or category of occupation” than was indicated in the Fir Mill Ltd. case. It said:
“Finally, all alternative cases to which the hereditament in its existing state could be put in the real world, and which would be in the minds of the competing bidders in the market, are to be taken as being within the same mode or category, where the existence of such competition can be established by evidence.”

Ho Tang Fat v CRV RA 12/78
The Tribunal had considered the UK cases Fir Mill Ltd. v Royton UDC and Jones (VO) and Midland Bank Ltd. v Lanham (VO) and held that factory use was not in the same mode or category of the subject tenement, which was a community hall.

CRV v Lai Kit Lau Mutual Aid Committee and Another [1986] HKLR 93
Following Midland Bank Ltd., it was held that all realistic alternative uses to which the premises could be put, as revealed by evidence, should be taken into account.

Williams (VO) v Scottish & Newcastle Retail Ltd. and Another [2001] RA 41
The Court of Appeal held that the Lands Tribunal was right in holding that two public houses must be valued disregarding their potential for shops and restaurant use because the works necessary for those uses were more than minor and because those uses were not in the same mode and category as public house use. The approach in Midland Bank Ltd. case (“all alternative uses to which the hereditament in its existing state could be put in the real world, and which would be in the minds of competing bidders in the market, are to be taken as being within the same mode or category...”) was rejected.

Receipts and Expenditure Method
The Cross-Harbour Tunnel Co. Ltd. v CRV [1978] HKLTLR 144
China Light & Power Co. Ltd. v CRV RA 180-185/91, CA 83, 101 & 167/94
These cases established that the receipts and expenditure method is appropriate in determining rateable values for certain types of specialised property and approved different methods in determining the tenant's share of the divisible balance. In the Cross-Harbour Tunnel case with a relatively small amount of tenant's capital, it was appropriate to have regard to the gross takings. In the China Light and Power case, the return on tenant's assets was determined after having regard to Capital Asset Pricing Model (CAPM) and Weighted Average Cost of Capital (WACC).

Recreation Clubs
Royal Hong Kong Golf Club v CRV [1977] HKLTLR 236
Hong Kong Country Club v CRV [1978] HKLTLR 67
Royal Hong Kong Yacht Club v CRV [1987] HKLTLR 1
These cases established that recreation clubs are to be assessed in Hong Kong based on the Contractor's Test principle with the land value reflecting the value for recreation or agricultural use. Decapitalisation rate on Estimated Capital Value is to be determined by reference to financial market rates.

State of Locality
Clement (VO) v Addis Ltd. [1988] 1 All ER 593
The House of Lords held that an intangible factor such as the existence of an enterprise zone nearby should be taken into account as it had affected the state of locality of the premises. The effect of this decision was later restricted by the enactment of the Local Government Finance Act 1988 which provided that matters affecting the physical state of the hereditament and physical state of the locality in which the hereditament is situated were to be taken into account.

State of Repair and Redevelopment Prospect
Wexler v Playle (VO) [1960] 1 QB 217, [1960] 1 All ER 338, 5 RRC 359, CA
The Court of Appeal held that the Lands Tribunal was correct in ignoring defects in a flat which were readily repairable, in arriving at the gross value of the flat under s 2(2) of the Valuation for Rating Act, 1953. The landlord's obligation to repair included the obligation to put the flat into repair and the defects being remediable were such that the hypothetical tenant would require him to put them right.

Saunders v Maltby (VO) [1976] 19 RRC 33, CA
The principle in Wexler v Playle was qualified by the Court of Appeal that if the cost of repair would be out of proportion to the value of the house, so much so that a hypothetical landlord would not do them all, then it must not be assumed he would do them.

Warren Chow v CRV [1977] HKLTLR 277
Man Sai Cheong Investment Co. Ltd v CRV [1978] RA 205/77
Wong Tak Woon v CRV RA 120/84 CA 127/86
Valuation must be made on the basis that the landlord would remedy readily remediable defects (Warren Chow). Premises in a very run down condition should be assessed on a refurbished basis as the cost was not out of proportion to the value of the property (Man Sai Cheong). Allowance should be made for very poor state if repairs would be uneconomical. Landlord's intention to redevelop the property must however be disregarded (Wong Tak Woon).

Tenancy from Year to Year
Staley v Castleton Overseers [1864] 33 LJMC 178
The hypothetical tenancy should be a tenancy from year to year and should not be a tenancy for a reasonable term of years.

R. v South Staffordshire Waterworks Co. [1885] 16 QBD 359
It was held that ‘a tenant from year to year is not a tenant for one, two, three, or four years but he is to be considered as a tenant capable of enjoying the property for an indefinite time, having a tenancy which it is expected will continue for more than a year, but which is liable to be put to an end by notice.’

Consett Iron Co. Ltd. v North-West Durham Assessment Committee [1931] AC 396
The House of Lords held that consideration should not be limited to the facts of the current year. The prospect of a reasonable continuance of the tenancy should be considered.

China Light & Power Co. Ltd. v CRV [1994/95] CPR 618, 626
Tenancy from year to year implies a reasonable expectation of its continuance.

Tenement
Yiu Lian Machinery Repairing Works Ltd. & Others v CRV [1982] HKLTLR32
Distinction between definition of “tenement” in Hong Kong and “hereditament” in UK was made.

Tone of the List
Ladies’ Hosiery and Underwear Ltd. v Middlesex Assessment Committee [1932] 2 KB 679
It was held that the appellant's hereditament had been entered in the valuation list at the proper figure. The fact that the seven other hereditaments had been assessed at a lower figure was irrelevant and could not be used to justify a reduction of the appellant's assessment. The rule was that correctness must not be sacrificed for uniformity.
