= 7C =

7C may refer to:

- 7C (TV series)
- Jeju Air, a Korean airline with IATA code 7C
- Seventh Cambridge Survey of Radio Sources, an astronomical radio source survey
- Percent-encoded pipe character (|), as represented in hexadecimal
- Transfăgărășan, a Romanian highway
- Terror of the Vervoids and The Ultimate Foe, Doctor Who serials with production code 7C

== See also ==
- C7 (disambiguation)
