= Division 7A dividend =

A Division 7A dividend in the Australian taxation system is an amount treated by the Australian Taxation Office (ATO) as an assessable dividend of a shareholder of a private company that attempts to make a tax-free distributions of profits to the shareholder, or an associate of the shareholder.

Division 7A applies to payments, loans and debts forgiven on or after 4 December 1997. However, it may also apply to loans in place before this date, where the amount of the loan is increased or its term extended on or after 4 December 1997. Division 7A applies to debts forgiven on or after 4 December 1997, regardless of when the debt was created.

== Objective ==
The objective of Division 7A is to reflect the reality of a situation, rather than the formality. As a matter of form, a dividend paid by a company is one that is declared by the directors of the company and either paid to the shareholders or credited to the shareholders account with the company. However, where a company pays amounts to or for shareholders, not expecting the amounts to be repaid, without formally declaring a dividend, the reality is that the advances are analogous to a dividend. This is the situation that Division 7A seeks to catch.

== Amounts caught ==
The amounts caught by the Division 7A rules include payments made by a private company to the shareholder or on behalf of a shareholder, and debts forgiven by the company. The rules also apply to payments etc. made to or for an associate of the shareholder.

Furthermore, payments etc. made by the company to an interposed entity, which then makes a payment etc. to the shareholder or an associate of the shareholder, would also be caught, if a reasonable person would conclude that the payment etc. was solely or mainly a part of an arrangement involving a payment etc. to the shareholder. But if a payment to the interposed entity is a dividend, then the amount of the dividend payment is exempt.

Amounts covered by qualifying commercial loans, which must be in place on the company's tax return lodgment day, are exempt from the Division 7A rules. If a qualifying commercial loan is in place, the amount covered by that loan reduces the amount caught by the Division 7A rules by the amount repaid by that date.

Where a payment is made to a shareholder (or their associate) in their capacity as an employee or an associate of an employee, Division 7A does not apply. Instead fringe benefits tax (FBT) may apply.

The company may be taken to have paid a Division 7A dividend to the shareholder equal to the amount caught by the Division 7A rules, limited to the private company's distributable surplus. The ATO can include the balance as an unfranked dividend of the shareholder or, in certain circumstances, as a franked dividend.

== Limitations ==
The total of Division 7A dividends in an income year is limited to a private company's distributable surplus for the year.

== Later dividends ==
To prevent double taxation, where an actual dividend is subsequently declared (called a later dividend), some or all of that dividend can be set off against a Division 7A dividend previously assessed, but the company is not obligated to set off. The later dividend could be either fully or partly franked, as for any dividend. To the extent that it has been previously assessed it is tax-exempt, but the imputation credit component of the later dividend is assessable, and credit available. This means that the franking credit attached to the dividend is still available to the shareholder. If lower, the amount that is set off is not treating as a dividend.

== Who is an associate? ==
For an individual shareholder, an associate includes a relative, partner, the spouse or child of that partner of the individual, a trustee of a trust estate under which the individual or an associate benefits, or a company under the control of the individual or associate.

For a company shareholder, an associate includes a partner of the company or a trustee of a trust estate under which the company or associate benefits, another individual or associate who controls the company, or another company which is under the control of the company or the company's associate.

For a trustee shareholder, an associate includes an entity or associate of the entity that benefits or is capable of benefiting under the trust.

For a partnership shareholder, an associate includes each partner of the partnership or associate of the partner.

== Qualifying commercial loans ==
Amounts covered by qualifying commercial loans are "excluded" from the calculations under Division 7A. To qualify, such loans must be in writing and meet the minimum interest rate and maximum term criteria set by the ATO. The rate of interest on these loans must not be less than a prescribed benchmark interest rate for each year of the loan. The term of the loan must not exceed either 25 years, if the loan amount is secured by a registered mortgage over real property, or 7 years otherwise. The rules also require that minimum repayments of the loan take place over the term of the loan, in accordance with an ATO prescribed formula.

== See also ==
- Dividend imputation
