= National Highway 7 (Djibouti) =

Road in Djibouti

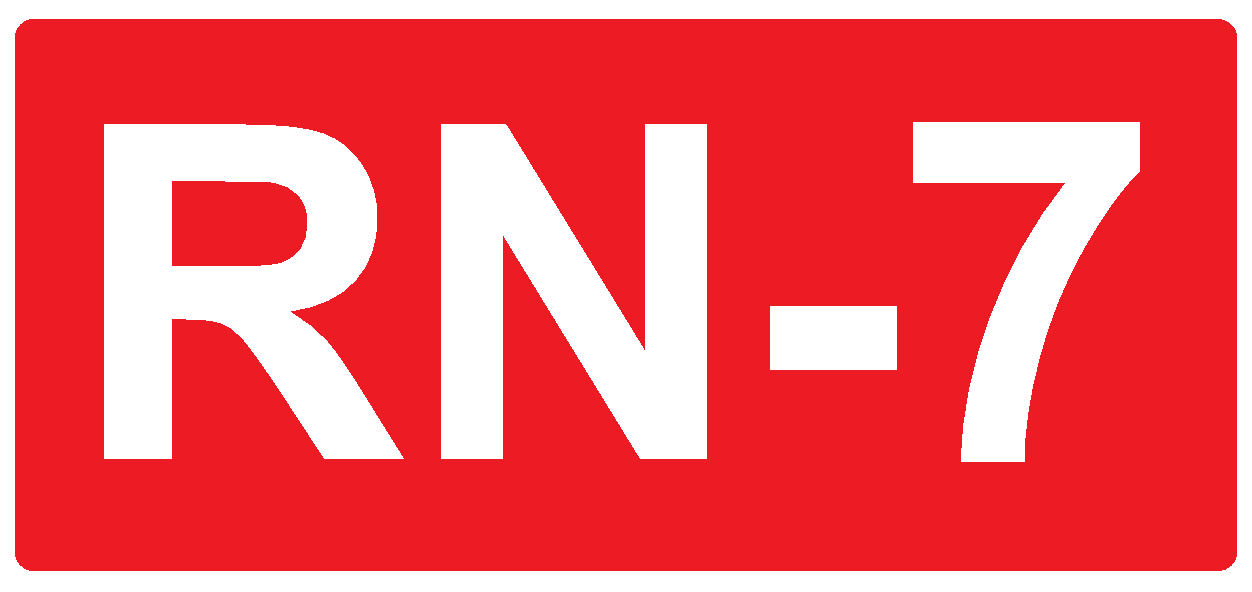
National Highway 7
- Arabic: الطريق السريع الوطنى 7 French: Route Nationale 7
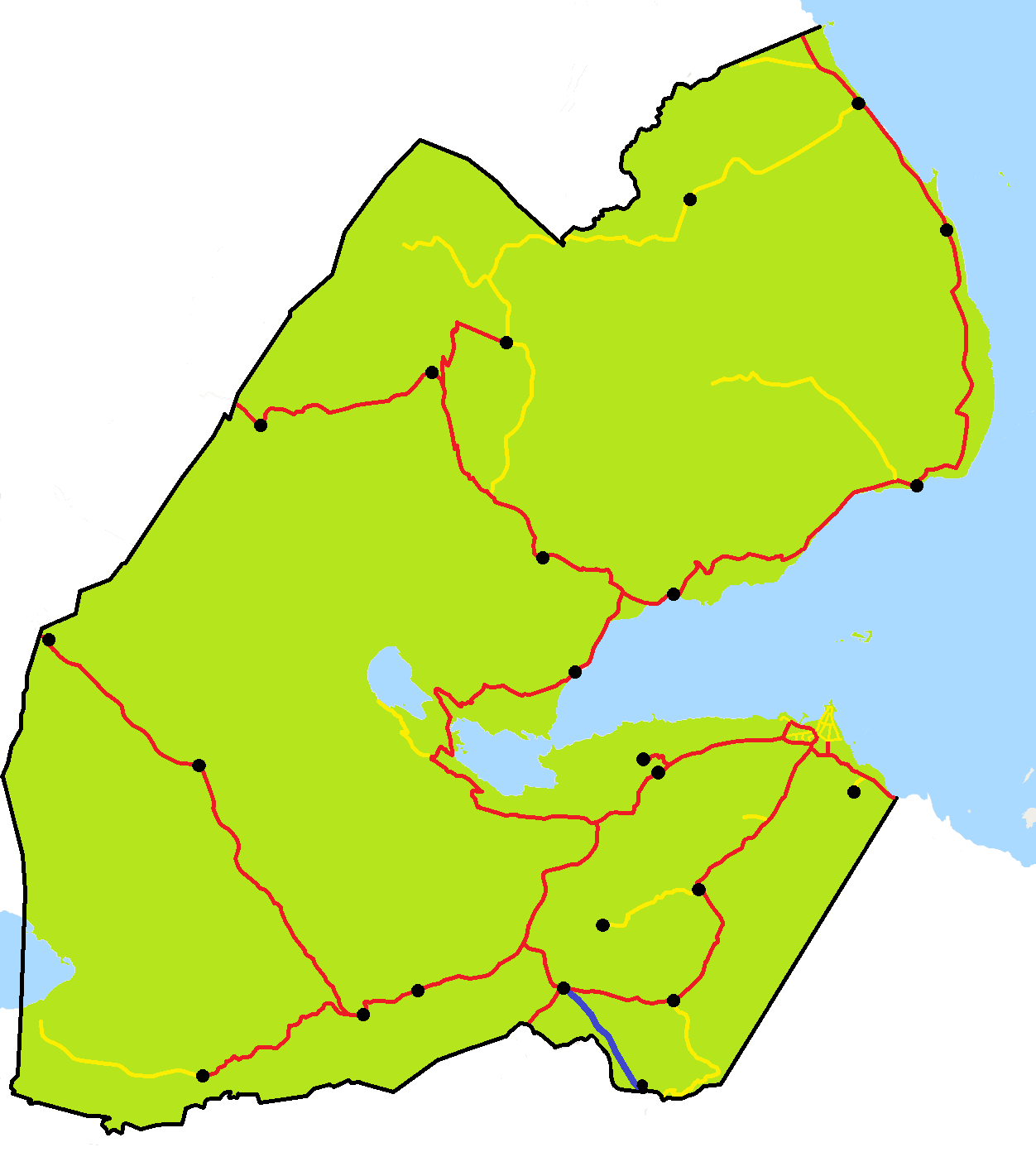

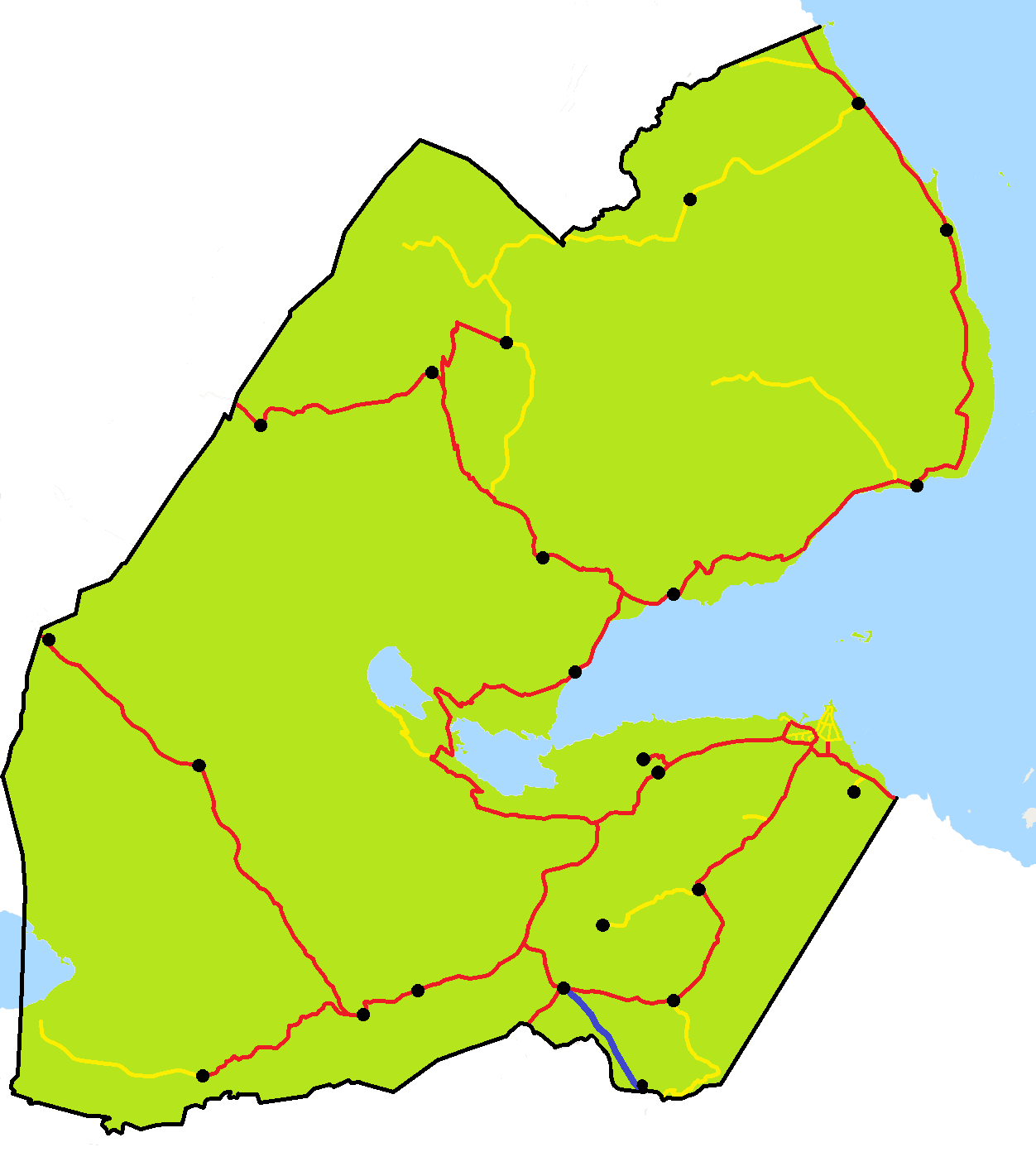

Route information
- Length: 25 km (16 mi)

Major junctions
- From: Ali Sabieh
- To: Assamo

Location
- Country: Djibouti

Highway system
- Transport in Djibouti

The RN-7 National Highway connects from Ali Sabieh to Assamo, and is 25 kilometres (16 mi) long.
