= A3 highway (Lithuania) =

Highway in Lithuania

A3
- Vilnius-Minsk

Route information
- Part of E28
- Length: 33.88 km (21.05 mi)

Major junctions
- From: Vilnius; A 15
- To: Medininkai; Belarus E28 / M 7

Location
- Country: Lithuania
- Major cities: Vilnius

Highway system
- Transport in Lithuania

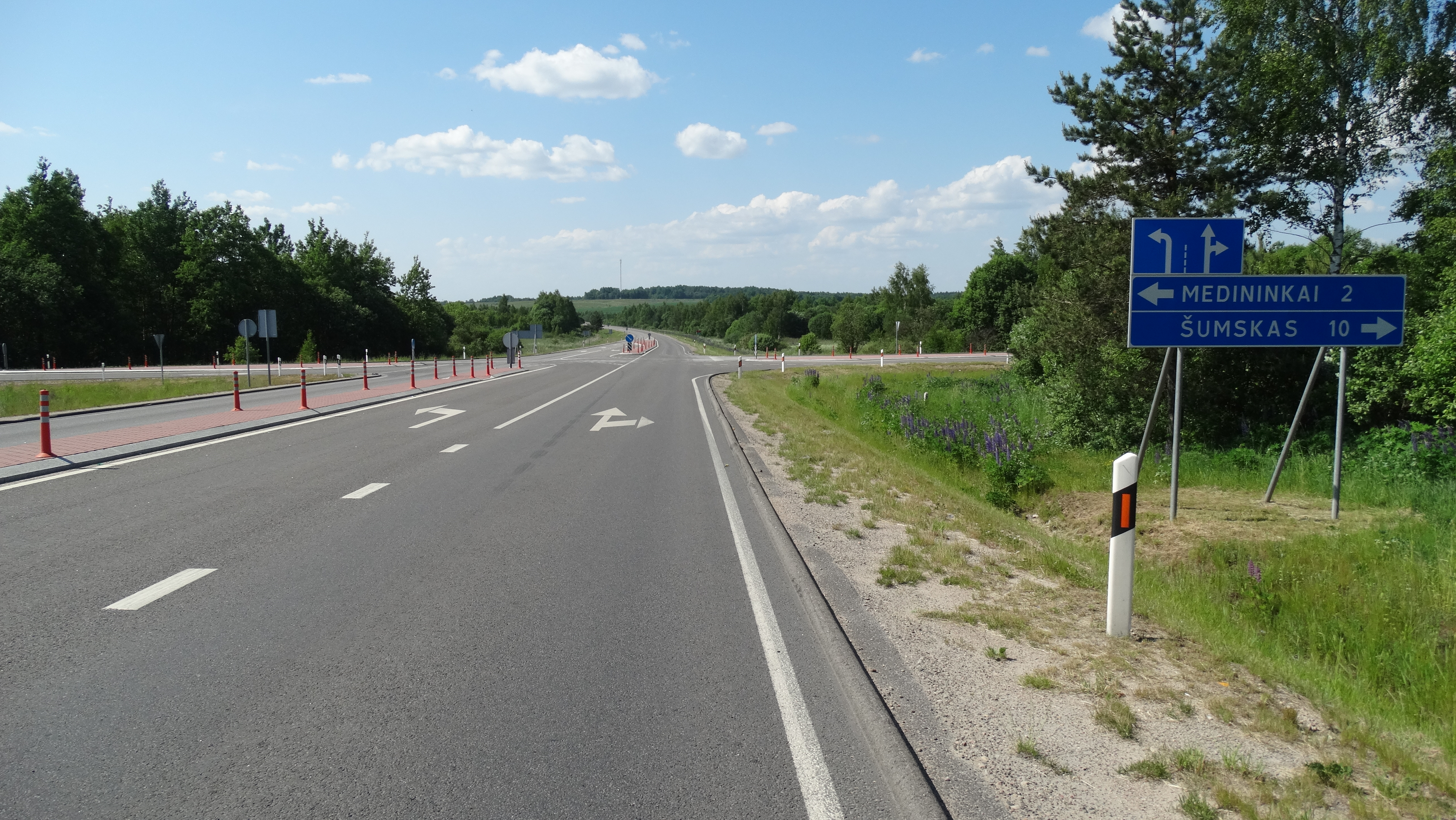
Road section near Medininkai

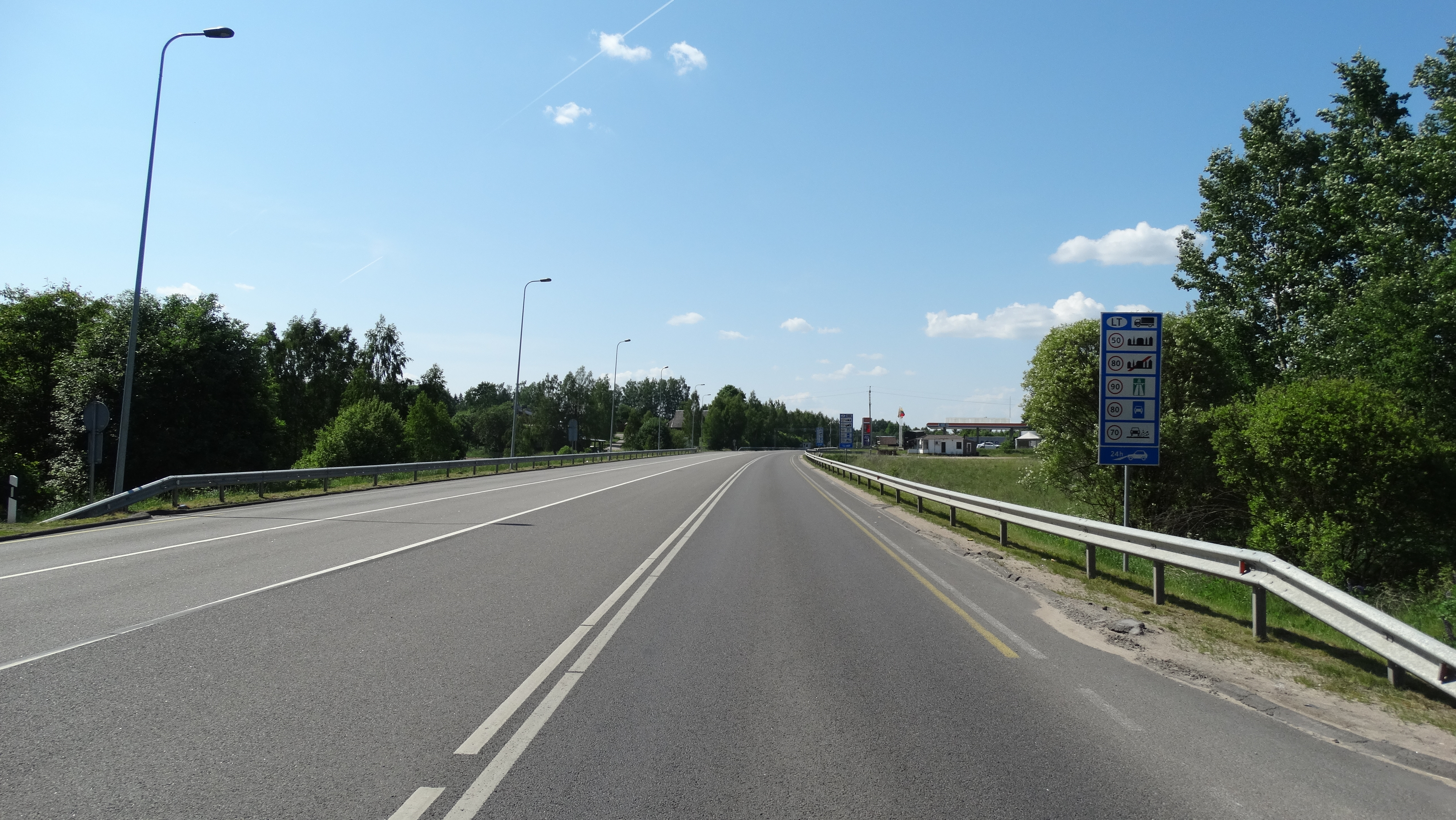
Kelias A3, pasienis

The A3 highway is a highway in Lithuania (Magistralinis kelias). It runs from Vilnius to the Belarus border, reaching Minsk. The length of the road is 33.88 km (21.05 mi).

A3 highway is part of European route E28 in the European route system. The E28 highway ultimately connects Berlin with Minsk.

At the Belarusian border, the A3 connects with the road M7 that leads to Minsk. From Vilnius to the junction with the 106 land road, the road has from four to six lanes (two or three lanes in each direction).
