= XEJB =

XEJB refers to two radio stations, both in Guadalajara, Jalisco and owned by the government of the state of Jalisco:

- XEJB-AM 630
- XEJB-FM 96.3
