= M7 highway (Belarus) =

Major road in Belarus

M7
- Магістраль М7

Route information
- Part of E28
- Length: 139 km (86 mi)

Major junctions
- Southeast end: Minsk
- Northwest end: Border of Lithuania

Location
- Country: Belarus
- Major cities: Minsk, Volozhin, Ashmyany, Astraviec

Highway system
- Roads in Belarus

М7 highway connects Minsk with Lithuanian border (it continues in Lithuania as A3). It is a part of European route E28 and Branch B of Pan-European Corridor IX. The highway is around 139 km long. It begins at the intersection of Pritycki street with Minsk Ring Road M9 and runs west, sharing the first 47 km with M6 highway. It then branches off from M6 near Volozhin and goes north-west near Ashmyany to Kamenny Log border crossing.

Distance (approx.)	Name	Other roads
0 km	Minsk	M 9
10 km		P 65
47 km		M 6
61 km	Volozhin	P 56
94 km	Smarhon	P 95
117 km	Ashmyany	P 63
120 km	Ashmyany, Astraviec	P 48
139 km	Kamenny Log border crossing	
	Lithuania	A 3 / E28
