= A7 highway (Nigeria) =

Road in Nigeria

Coordinates: 8.742579°N 4.141932°E

Trunk Road A7

Location
- Country: Nigeria

Highway system
- Transport in Nigeria

The A7 highway is a highway in Nigeria. It runs from the A1 highway at Ilorin, the capital of Kwara State in a northwesterly direction to the border with Benin. It passes through Kishi and Kaiama and reaches Benin some distance beyond Gwasero, at the border town of Kosubosu, the headquarters of Baruten Local Government Area of Kwara State.
